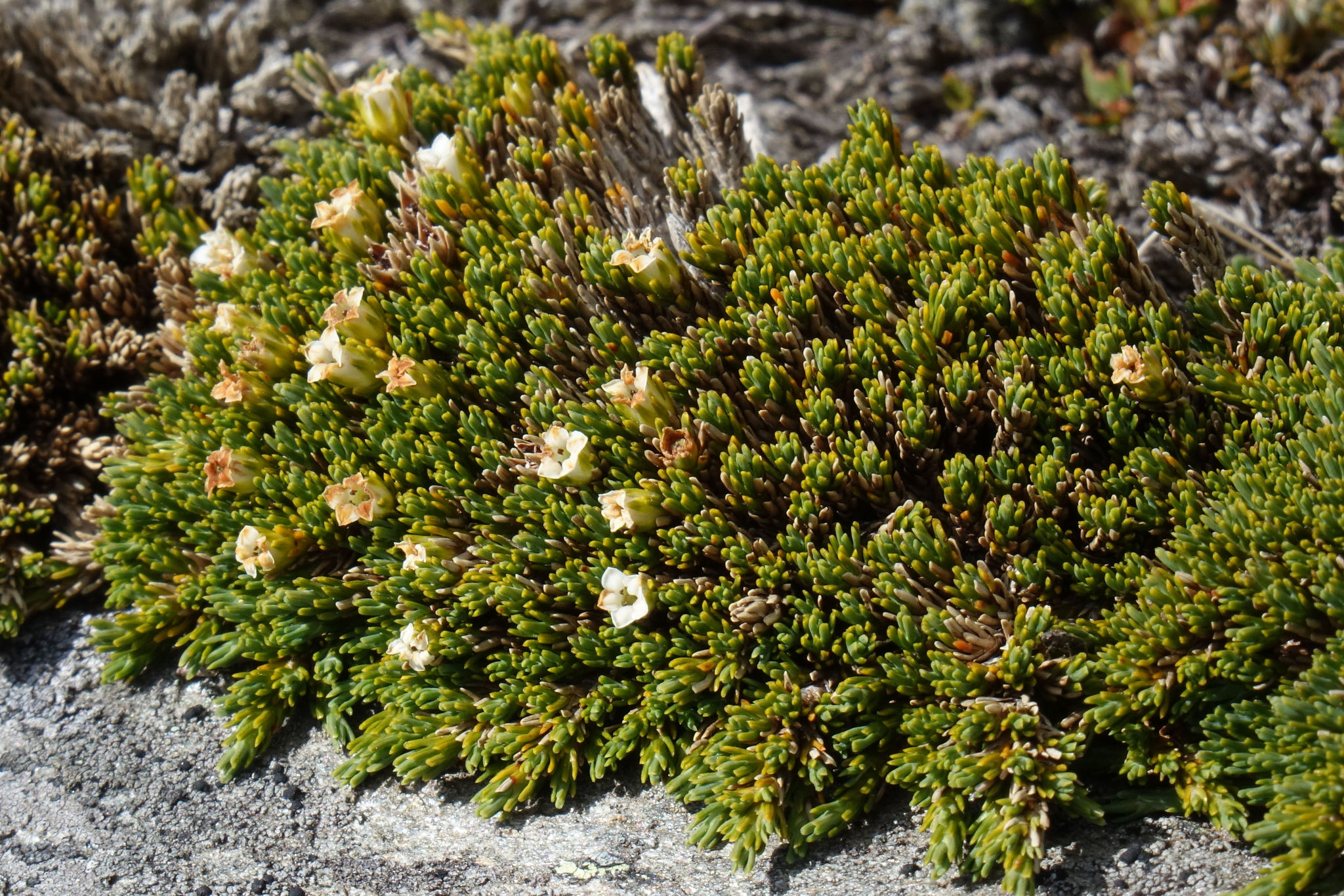

Scientific classification
- Kingdom: Plantae
- Clade: Tracheophytes
- Clade: Angiosperms
- Clade: Eudicots
- Clade: Asterids
- Order: Ericales
- Family: Ericaceae
- Genus: Dracophyllum
- Species: D. muscoides

Binomial name
- Dracophyllum muscoides Hook.f.

= Dracophyllum muscoides =

Species of flowering plant in the heath family

Dracophyllum muscoides, commonly known as cushion inaka, is a small cushion plant in the family Ericaceae. It is endemic to New Zealand and is found only in the South Island in sub-alpine regions.

== Description ==
D. muscoides grows into a small cushion just 15–50 mm (0.6–2.0 in) tall, despite its upright branch growth, with many-branched stems and greyish-brown bark; though new growth is a reddish-brown colour. Its leaves grow in a spiral around branches; overlapping and pressing against each other. The olive green leaves are 1–3 by 0.3–0.8 mm and are contained within 1.5–3 by 1.5–3 light green sheathes. On the front third of the narrow leaves are tiny teeth, with 5–10 per cm. Flowering occurs from December to May, producing small white flowers, each on a sessile terminal inflorescence. The flowers are made up of oval-shaped 1.5–4 .5 by 1.5–2.0 mm sepals growing out of a 2.0–2.5 by 1.5–3.5 mm white bell-shaped corolla tube. The corolla tube has 1.0–1.5 by 1.0–1.5 mm glabrous lobes. In the upper third of the flower is the stamen, which is made up of 0.8–1.0 mm long light yellow anthers on top of 0.2–0.5 mm long filaments. It also has a 1.4–1.5 by 1.3–1.4 mm ovary and 0.5–0.9 by 0.5–0.7 mm nectary scales. Fruiting is from February to August, yielding 1.0–1.1 by 0.8–1.0 mm fruit inside which are 0.5–0.6 mm long yellowish-brown oval seeds which are dispersed by the wind.

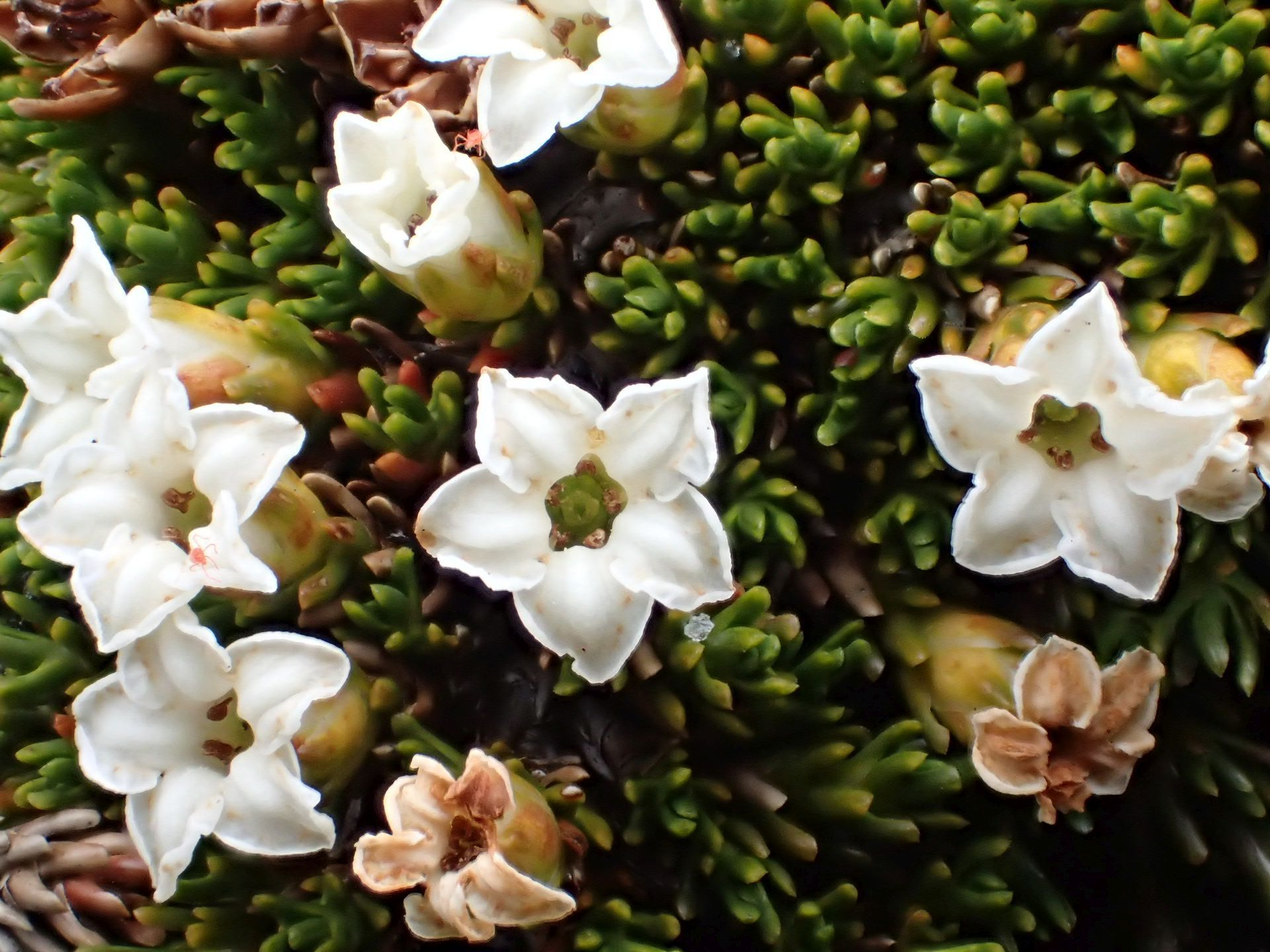
Flowers

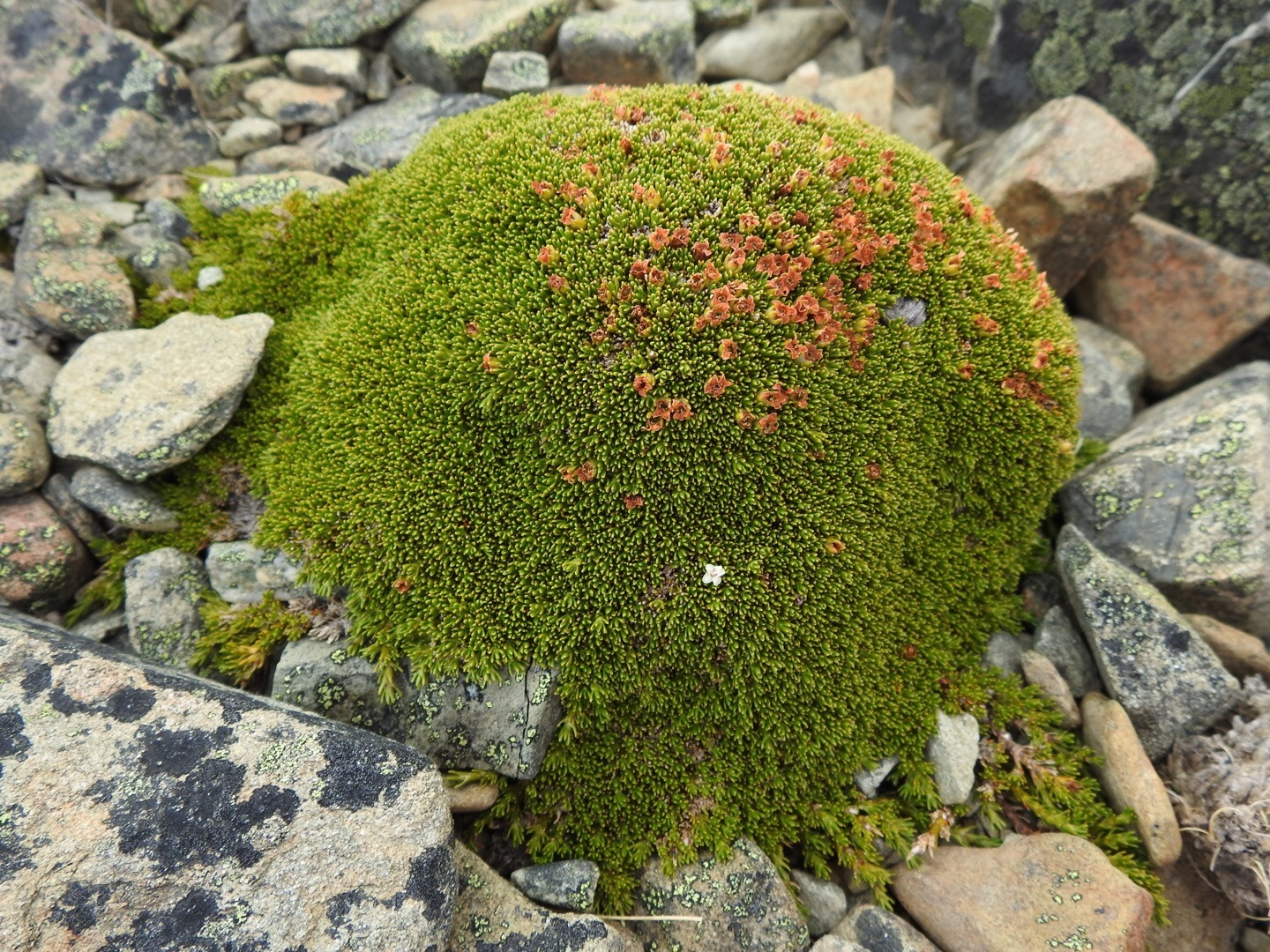
The growth habit

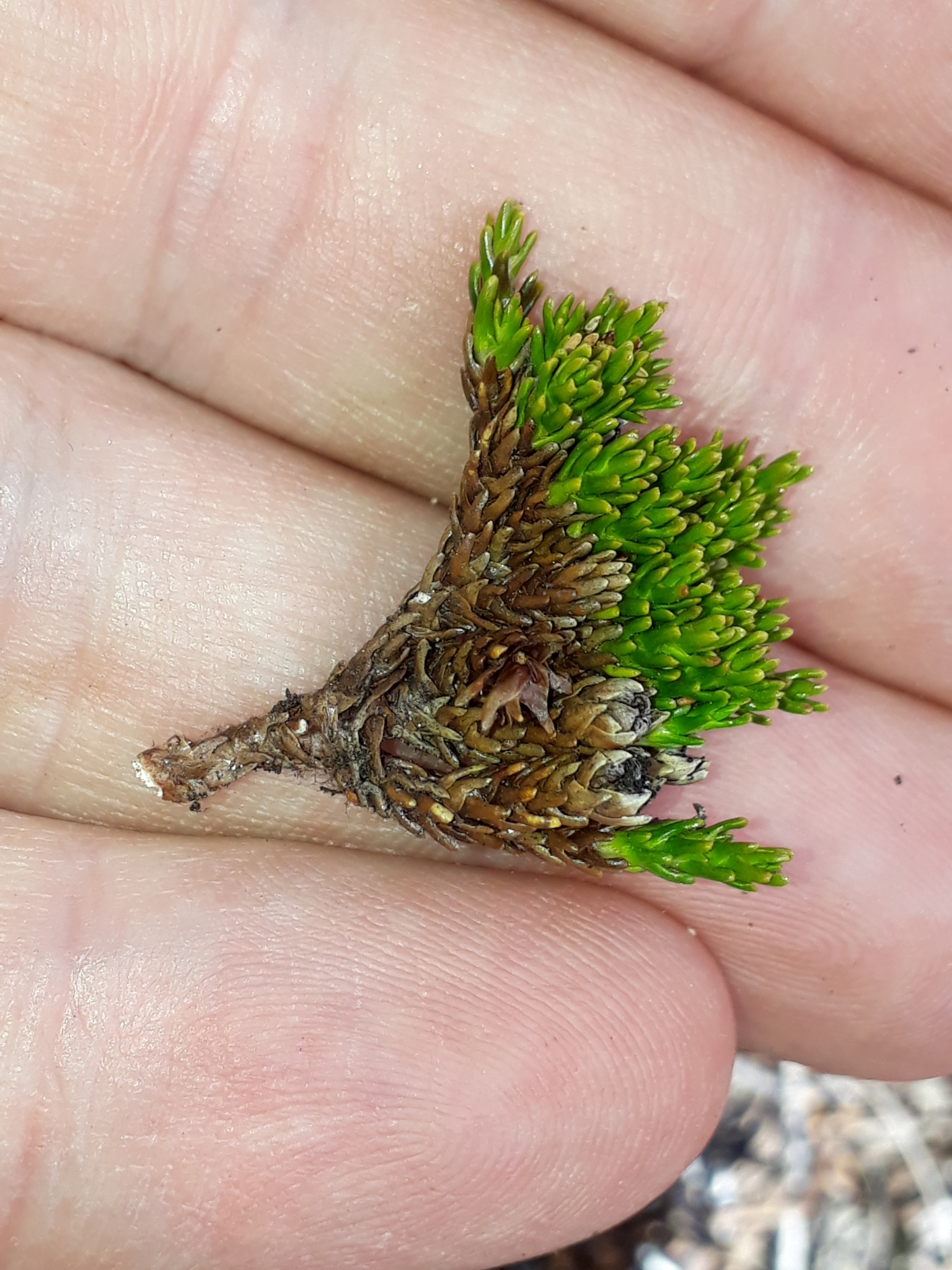
The "spiraled" leaves

== Taxonomy ==
- - - - - - - - D. acerosum
              - D. densum
              - D. filifolium
              - D. kirkii
              - D. ophioliticum
              - D. patens
              - D. rosmarinifolium
              - D. trimorphum
            - D. arboreum
            - D. longifolium
            - D. muscoides
            - D. pronum
            - D. scoparium
        - - D. strictum
    - - - - D. fiordense
          - D. menziesii
        - - D. latifolium
          - D. townsonii
      - - D. traversii
  - other Dracophyllum spp.

Cladogram showing the phylogeny of selected species within the genus Dracophyllum, from research published in 2010.
Subgenus Oreothamnus
Subgenus Dracophyllum

D. muscoides was first described in 1864 by Joseph Dalton Hooker in his Handbook of the New Zealand Flora from a specimen collected by Hector and Buchanan 7–8000 ft up in the alps near Otago.

=== Etymology ===
Dracophyllum is from the genus's similarity to the species in the genus Dracaena from the Canary Islands and is from the Ancient Greek for "dragon-leaf". The specific epithet muscoides means "moss-like" and is from the Latin muscus, meaning "moss", and -oides, meaning "resembling".

=== Phylogeny ===
Hooker claimed that it was closely allied to D. minimum, however W. R. B. Oliver, the first person to attempt to arrange the genus Dracophyllum taxonomically, did not totally agree. In a 1952 supplement of the Trans. Proc. R. Soc. N. Z., he placed D. muscoides in a group with D. prostratum and D. pronum, leaving D. minimum to its own group, in the subgenus Oreothamnus. Oliver, however, conducted his research based purely on morphological characteristics such as growth habit, leaves, and flowers. In 2010 a team of several botanists, including Stephanus Venter, published an article on the genus Dracophyllum in the Annals of the Missouri Botanical Garden. In it, they performed a cladistic analysis and produced a phylogenetic tree of the tribe Richeeae and other species using genetic sequencing. They found that only the subgenus Oreothamnus as well as the tribe Richeeae were monophyletic and that D. muscoides is contained within a Paraphyletic group with D. pronum and others. The paraphyly of the genus Dracophyllum, as well as the polyphyly of the closely related genus Richea, they argued, suggested that a major taxonomic revision was required. Stephanus Venter revised the genus in 2021, merging the genus Richea into two subgenera, named D. Subg. Cystanthe and D. Subg. Dracophylloides, of Dracophyllum. Though he noted that because the 2010 study was based on plastid sequence data and did not attain some species with strong enough evidence, the subgenera are instead based on morphological characteristics.

D. muscoides's placement can be summarised in the cladogram at right.

== Distribution and habitat ==
D. muscoides is endemic to New Zealand and is found only in the South Island of New Zealand from Mount Hercules south. It grows in sub-alpine herb-fields, boulder-fields, grassland, and alpine bog at 914–2,600 m (3,000–8,530 ft) above sea level.
