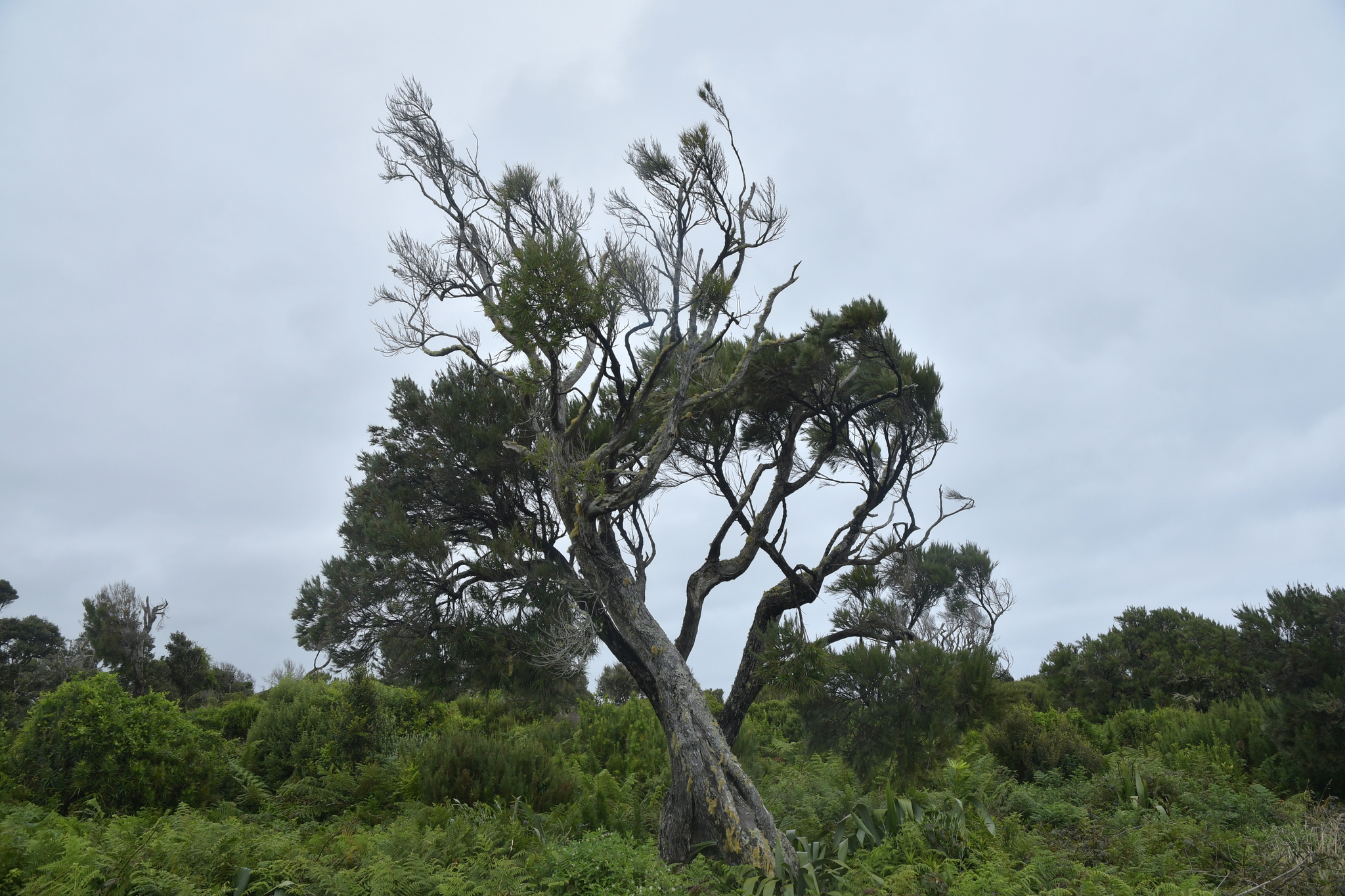

Conservation status
- Naturally Uncommon (NZ TCS)

Scientific classification
- Kingdom: Plantae
- Clade: Tracheophytes
- Clade: Angiosperms
- Clade: Eudicots
- Clade: Asterids
- Order: Ericales
- Family: Ericaceae
- Genus: Dracophyllum
- Species: D. arboreum

Binomial name
- Dracophyllum arboreum Cockayne

Synonyms
- Dracophyllum latifolium var. ciliolatum Hook.f.; Dracophyllum scoparium var. major Cheeseman; Dracophyllum scoparium F.Muell.

= Dracophyllum arboreum =

Species of tree in the heath family from the Chatham Islands

Dracophyllum arboreum, commonly known as Chatham Island grass tree and tarahinau (Moriori), is a species of tree in the heath family Ericaceae. Endemic to the Chatham Islands of New Zealand, it reaches a height of 18 m (60 ft) and has leaves that differ between the juvenile and adult forms.

D. arboreum has wide light green leaves in its juvenile form, which become thin needles as it gains maturity. Flowering occurs from November through to February, yielding small white flowers which later become tiny brown fruit. It inhabits many different types of vegetation communities from near sea level to 270 m (886 ft), including swamps, cliffs, bogs, and shrublands. It has a range restricted to three Islands some 800 km (497 mi) east of New Zealand: the Chatham, Pitt, and Rangatira Islands.

It was first described by the British botanist Joseph Hooker in 1867 as a variety of the species D. latifolium, but was first given the status as a species itself in 1902 by the New Zealand botanist Leonard Cockayne. Another New Zealand botanist, Thomas Cheeseman, demoted it once again to a variety in 1906, this time of D. scoparium, but this change has not been recognised by other botanists and institutions. The New Zealand naturalist Walter Oliver placed it in the subgenus Oreothamnus in 1928. A cladistic analysis in 2010 revealed through genetic sequencing that it was part of a paraphyletic group and not directly related to D. patens, as Oliver had suggested in his 1952 supplement, but to D. scoparium, as he had originally thought.

== Description ==
Dracophyllum arboreum is a tree which grows to a height of 4–18 m (13–59 ft). It has greyish brown bark with new growth a reddish brown to yellow. Its leaves are dimorphic, meaning they differ between the juvenile and adult stages dramatically. The juvenile leaves are green 10–22 by 1–1.8 cm (3.94–8.66 by 0.39–0.71 in) and leathery. The juvenile leaves are also completely hairless, except for dense, tiny hairs along the edges. The adult leaves, on the other hand, are narrow, 25–90 by 1–2 mm (0.98–3.54 by 0.04–0.08 in), and needle-like. They are hairless, except for a margin that is covered with many tiny hairs, as well as a tuft of hair at the base of the top side.

Flowering occurs from November to February, (Note: The NZPCN describes flowering as occurring all year round, whereas in Venter's 2021 revision of the genus, he describes it as from November to February.) producing spiked terminal inflorescences (flower clusters) with 4–9 flowers on each. They grow off of lateral branchlets, and are 15–38 mm (0.59–1.50 in) long (shorter than the leaves), while the inflorescence bract is 18–20 by 3–5 mm (0.7–0.8 by 0.1–0.2 in). As with the leaves, they are mostly hairless, except for hairs around the margins and many at the base of the upper side. The flowers are sessile, meaning they are attached directly to the stem, with persistent, ovate flower bracts 5.5–9 by 2.5–3 mm. The corolla, or petals, is also white and cylindrically shaped, with a size of 4–5 by 2.5–3.0 mm, and has reflexed triangle-shaped lobes. Its sepals (the leafy part) are ovate-lanceolate and 4.0–7.0 by 2.5–3.0 mm, which is longer than the corolla tube. The stamens are found in the upper third of the corolla and are made up of a 0.3–0.4 mm long light yellow anther on top of a 0.3–1 mm long filament, the length of which varies between populations. In addition to this it has a 1.7–2 by 1–2 mm hairless obovate ovary and 1.0–1.2 by 0.5–0.8 mm oblong nectary scales. The style is 2– 2.5 mm long and hairless.

Fruiting occurs year round, yielding sessile 1.2–1.5 by 1–1.5 mm dark brown and oblong fruit, contained in which is a 0.6–0.65 mm long yellowish-brown and egg-shaped seed. D. arboreum is similar to D. scoparium and D. cockayneanum, but differs mainly by the fact that it has juvenile leaves, which D. scoparium lacks. D. cockayneanum is more similar, but can be distinguished by its much smaller, hairy juvenile leaves as well as floral bracts which aren't persistent. D. arboreum's adult leaves also taper to a point and only have hairs on the edges and bottom of the top side, as opposed to those of D. cockayneanum, which are more rounded and are covered with hairs all over.

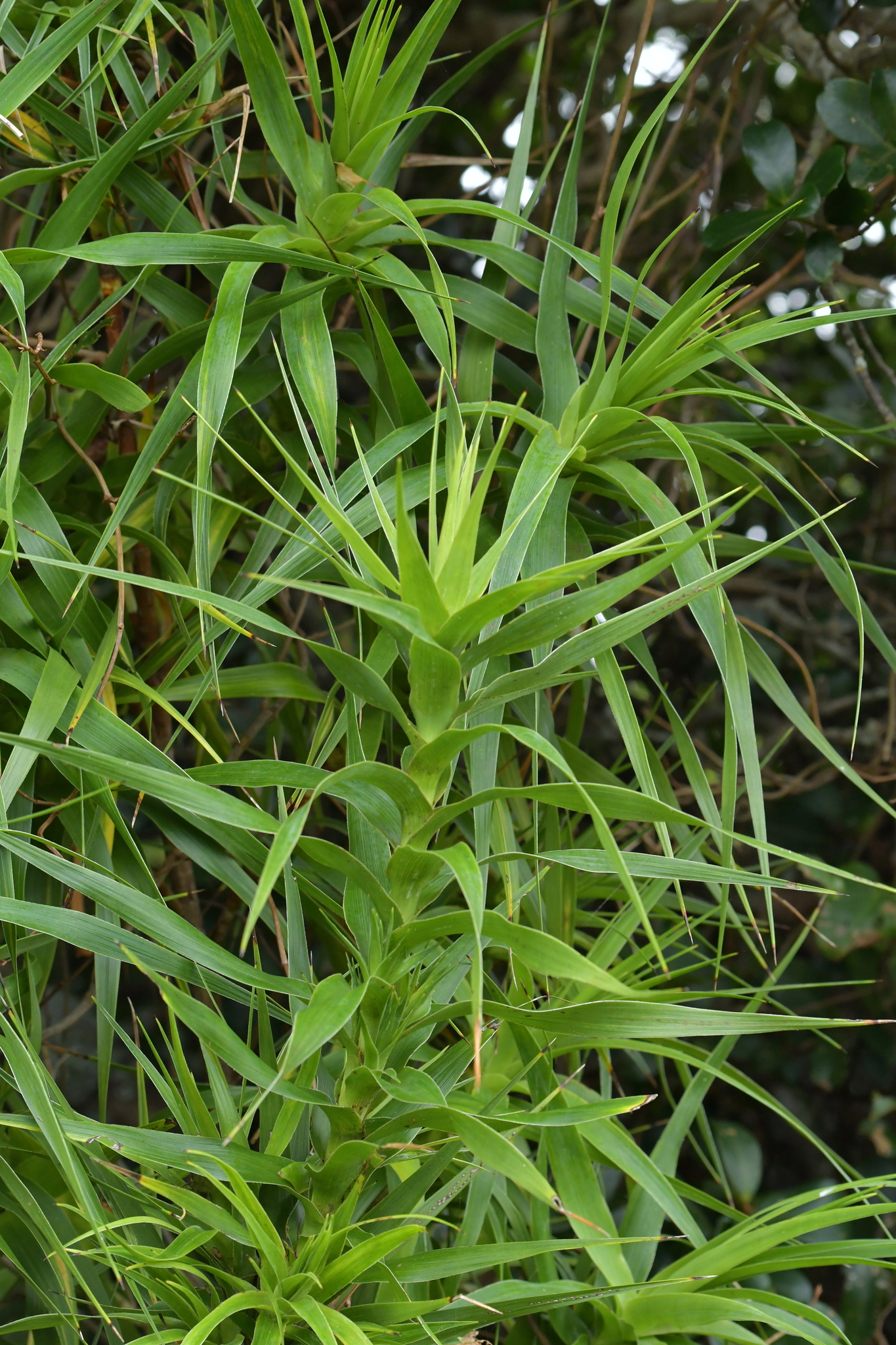
Juvenile foliage

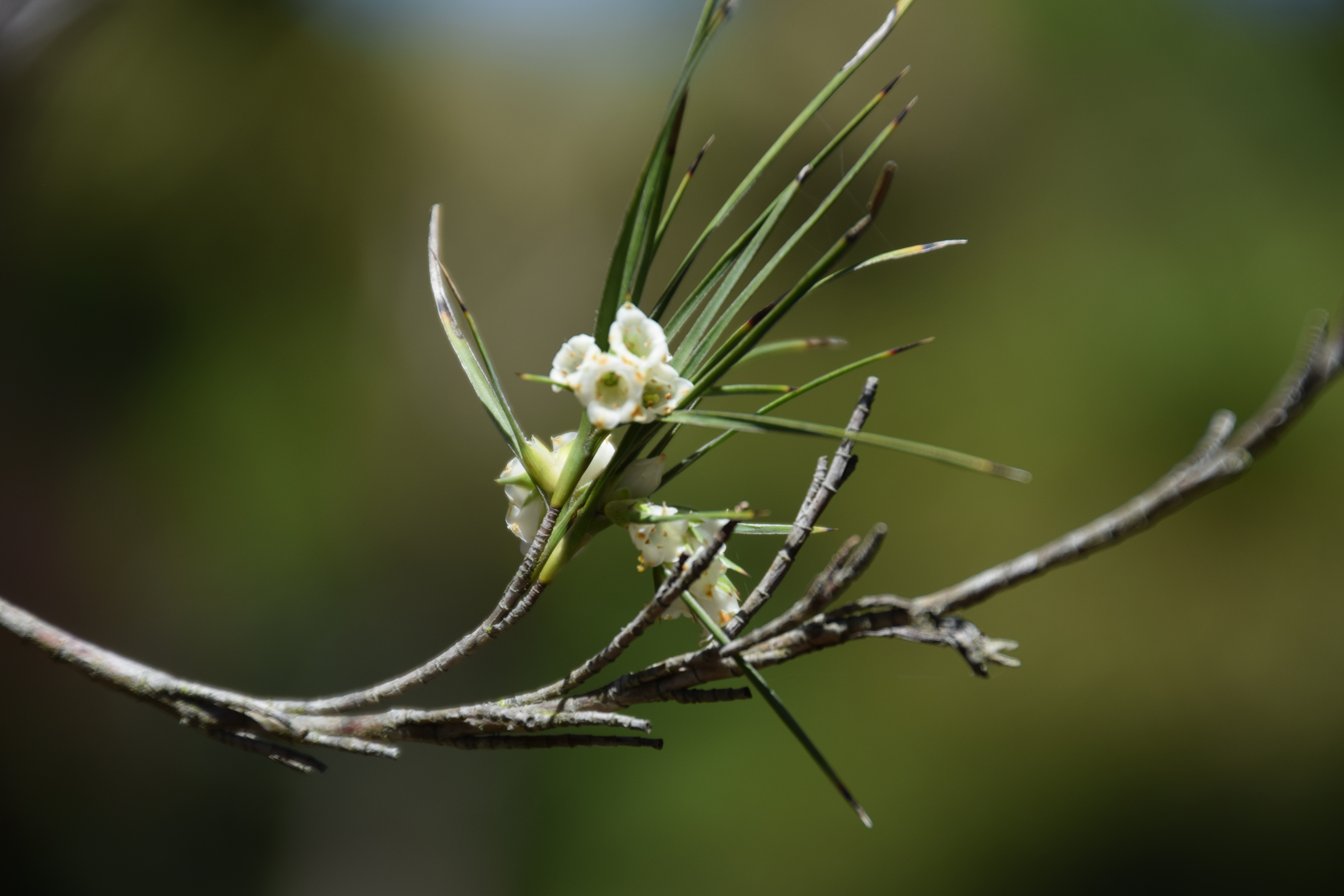
Inflorescence and some adult leaves

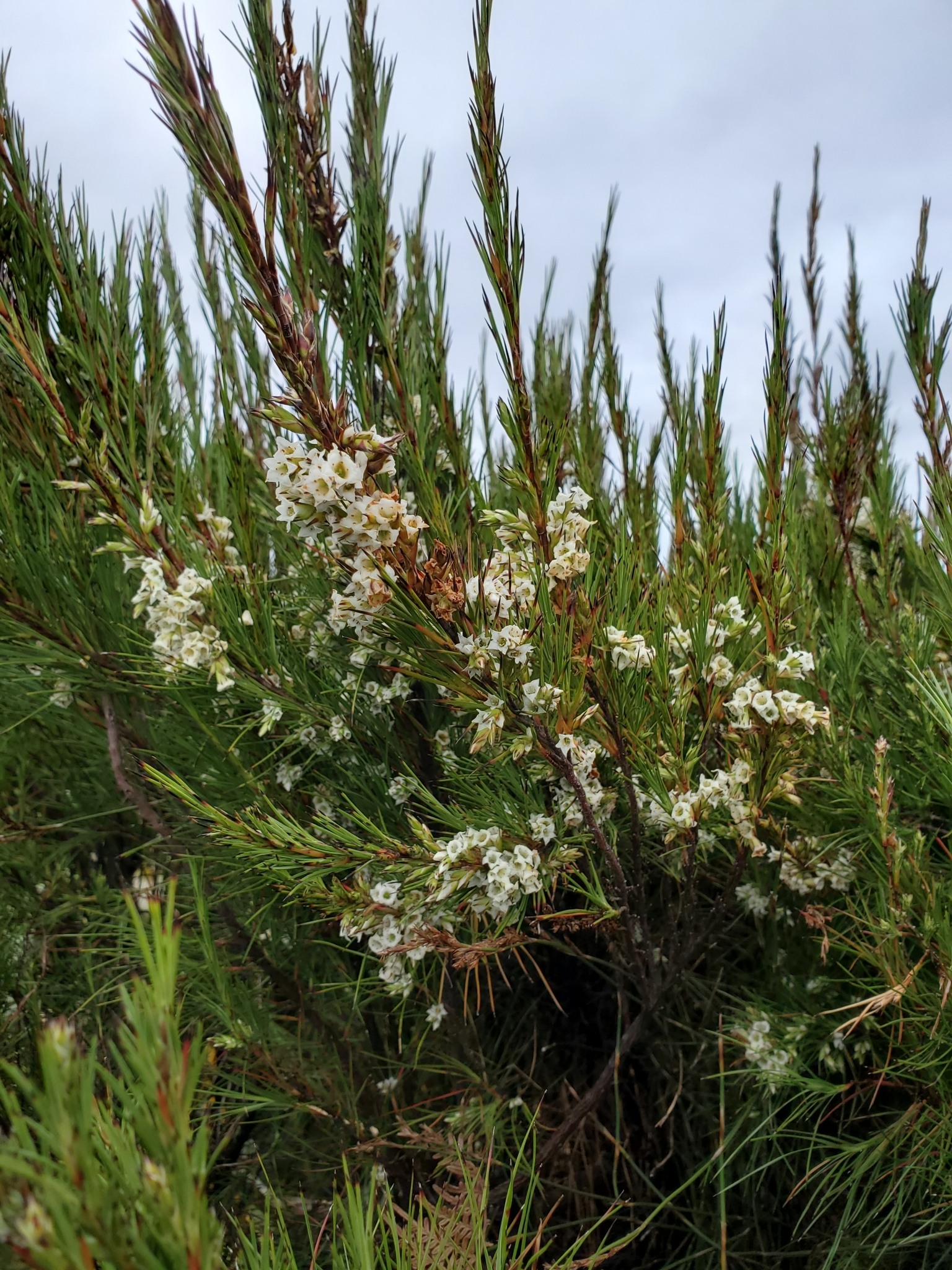
A whole plant in flower

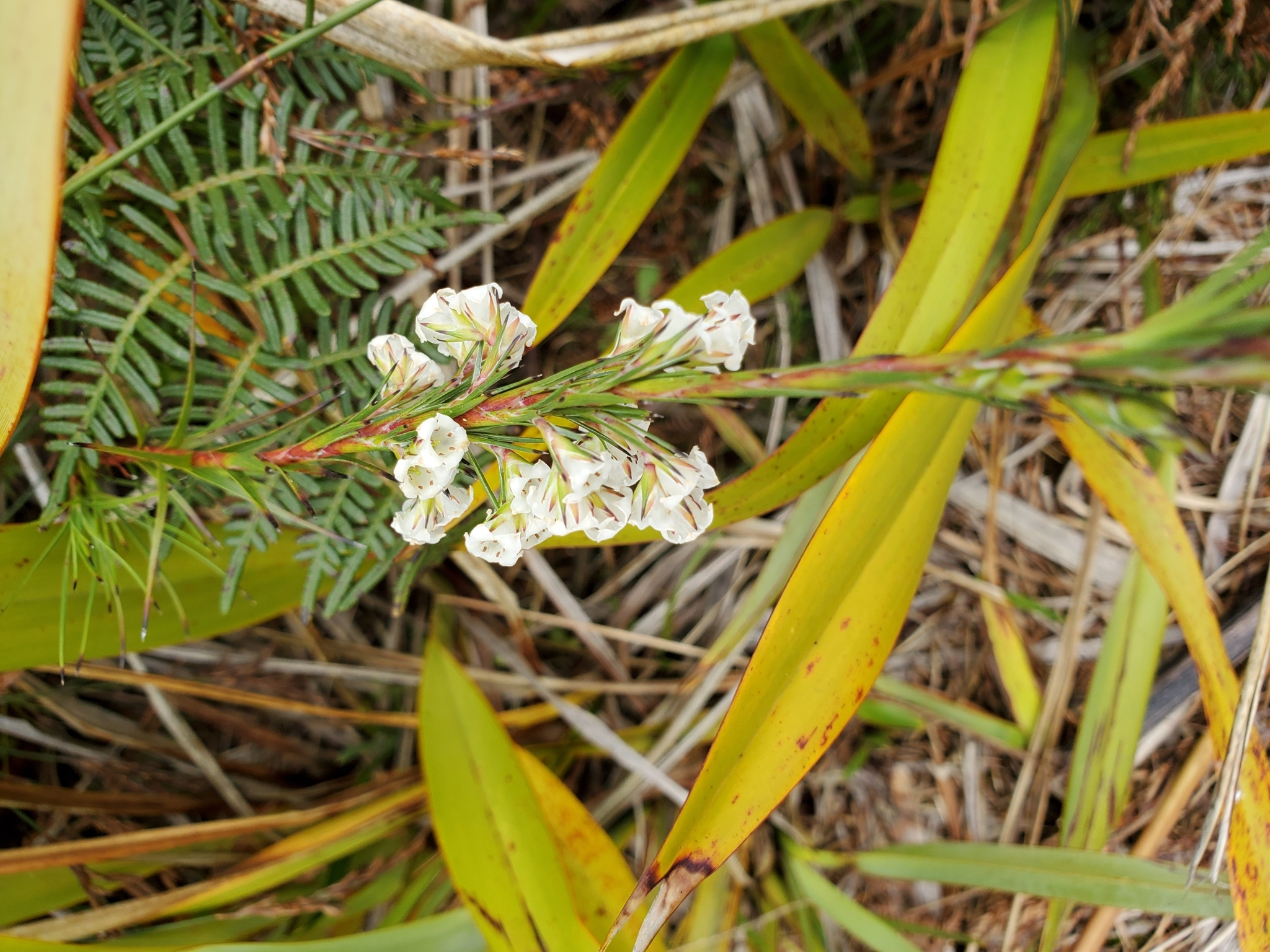
Inflorescence from above

== Taxonomy ==
- - - - - - - - D. acerosum
              - D. densum
              - D. filifolium
              - D. kirkii
              - D. ophioliticum
              - D. patens
              - D. rosmarinifolium
              - D. trimorphum
            - D. arboreum
            - D. longifolium
            - D. muscoides
            - D. pronum
            - D. scoparium
        - - D. strictum
    - - - - D. fiordense
          - D. menziesii
        - - D. latifolium
          - D. townsonii
      - - D. traversii
  - other Dracophyllum spp.

Cladogram showing the phylogeny of selected species within the genus Dracophyllum, from research published in 2010.
Subgenus Oreothamnus
Subgenus Dracophyllum

D. arboreum was first described by the botanist Joseph Dalton Hooker in 1867 as a variety of D. latifolium, called D. latifolium var. ciliolatum. He noted that the variety was found in the Chatham Islands and had leaves with margins covered with many small hairs, hence the name ciliolatum from ciliolate, meaning covered with tiny hairs. Leonard Cockayne first gave it species status in the 1901 issue of the Transactions and Proceedings of the Royal Society of New Zealand, then known as the Transactions and Proceedings of the New Zealand Institute, but only published in July 1902. Although not a full description, he cited that the differences in foliage between the juvenile and adult forms where more than enough to classify it as separate from D. scoparium, despite their similar flowers. Thomas Cheeseman demoted D. arboreum to a variety of D. scoparium, called D. scoparium var. major, due to its height, stoutness, and more dense hairs on its leaves. In Stephanus Venter's 2009 thesis and 2021 revision of the genus, this variant is listed as a synonym of D. arboreum, as is the Dracophyllum scoparium described by the German-Australian botanist Ferdinand von Mueller in 1864, though he accepts the one described by Hooker.

=== Etymology ===
Dracophyllum is from the genus's similarity to the species in the genus Dracaena from the Canary Islands and is from the Ancient Greek for "dragon-leaf". The specific epithet arboreum means "tree-like", in reference to its tree growth habit.

=== Classification and Evolution ===
In a 1952 supplement of the Transactions and Proceedings of the Royal Society of New Zealand, W. R. B. Oliver published a revised taxonomic arrangement of the genus Dracophyllum which he had first attempted in 1928. In this supplement he moved D. arboreum from the group containing D. scoparium into the group of D. sinclairii, along with D. patens and D. viride (now regarded as a synonym of D. sinclairii), citing their similar life history and "general resemblance", and kept it in the subgenus Oreothamnus. Oliver, however, conducted his research based purely on morphological characteristics such as growth habit, leaves, and flowers.

Wagstaff et al. 2010 used cladistics to produce a phylogenetic tree of the tribe Richeeae and other species using genetic sequencing. They found that only the subgenus Oreothamnus and the tribe Richeeae were monophyletic. The paraphyly of the genus Dracophyllum, as well as the polyphyly of the closely related genus Richea, they argued, suggested that a major taxonomic revision was required. Venter revised the genus in 2021. D. arboreum is placed in the clade formed by several subgenus Oreothamnus species, with D. strictum (in the subgenus Dracophyllum) as sister to this clade. Its placement can be summarised in the cladogram at right.

== Distribution and habitat ==
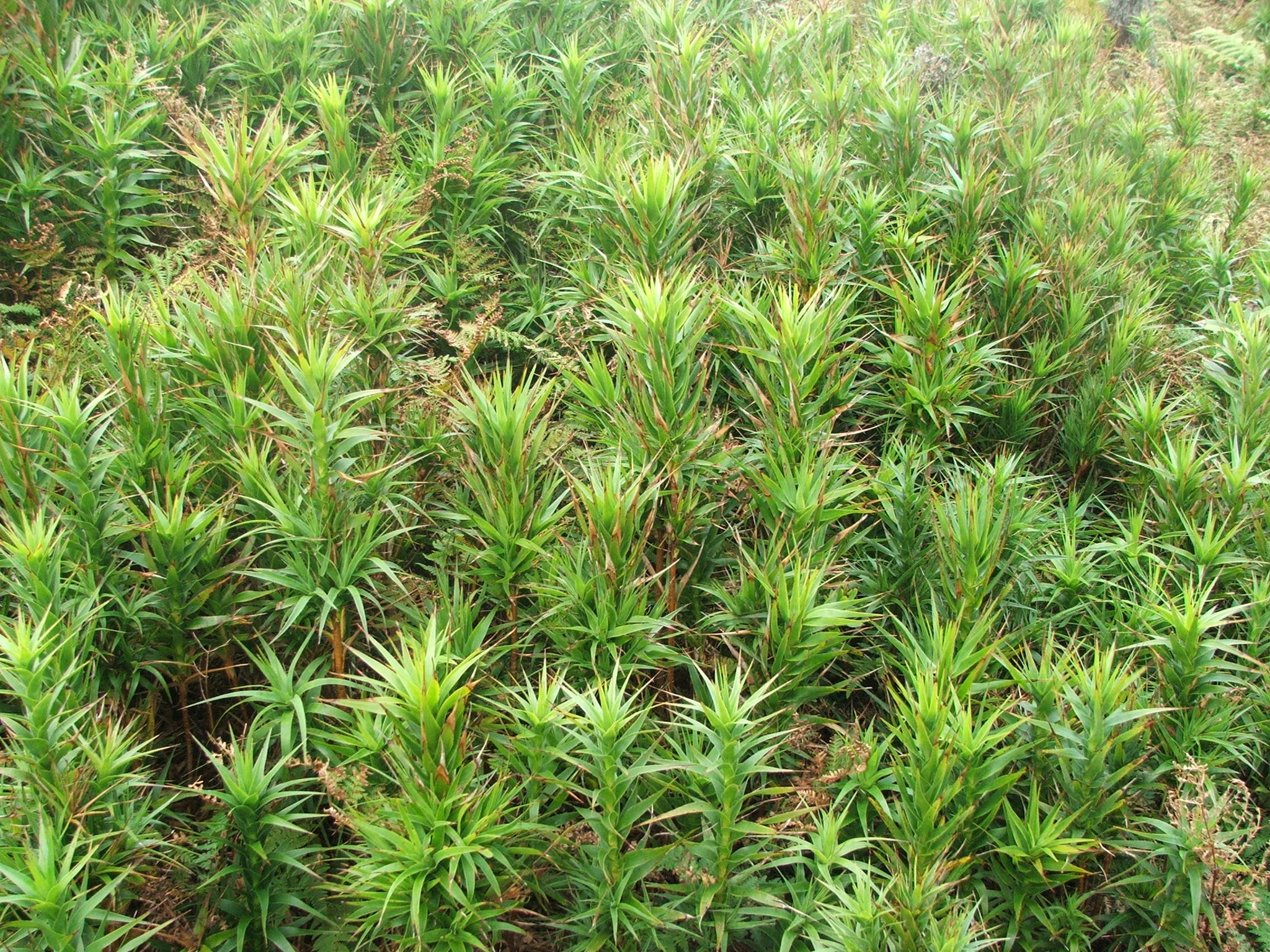
D. arboreum in its juvenile form covering the ground

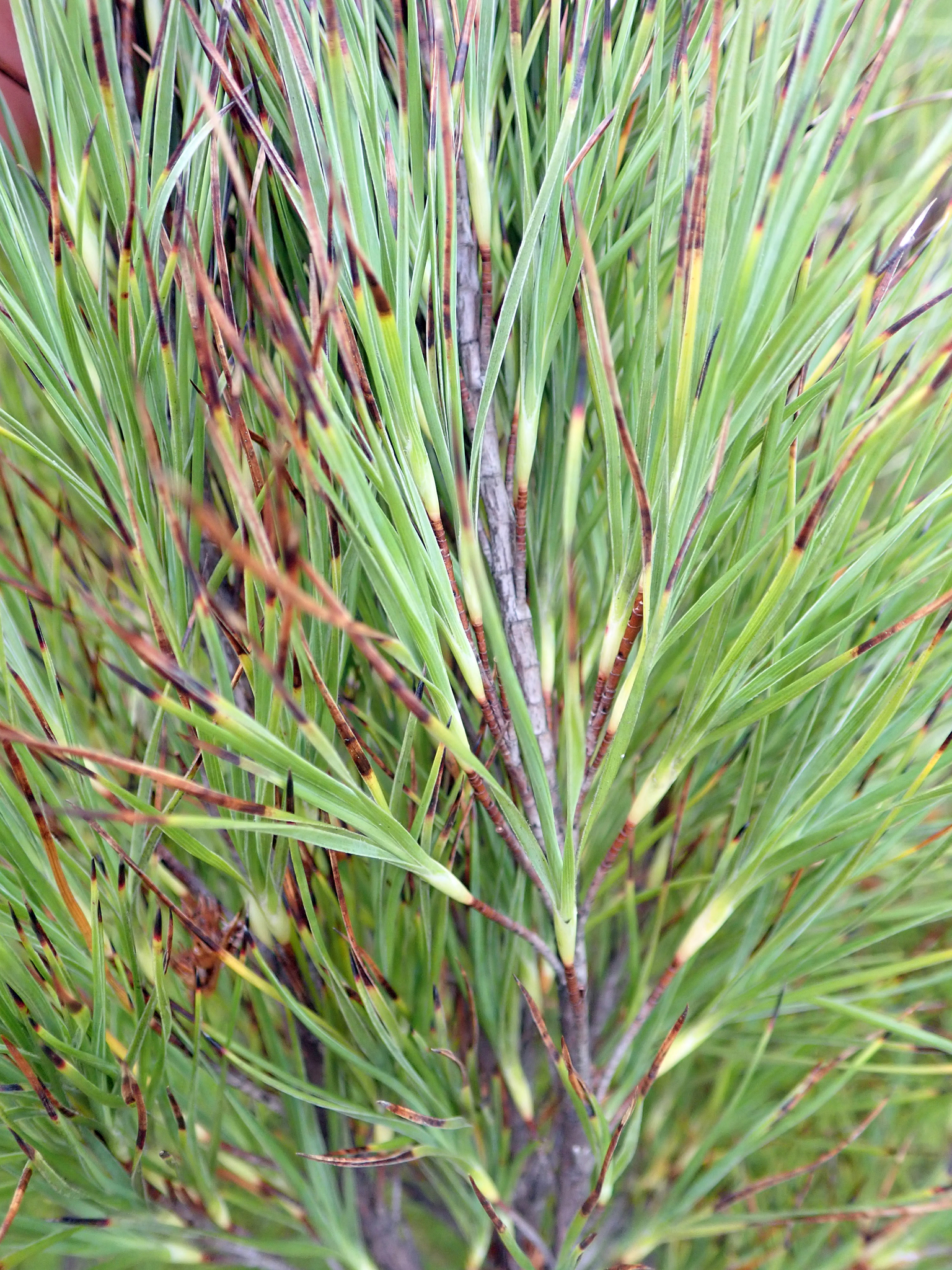
The adult leaves

Endemic to the Chatham Islands, an island chain around 800 km (500 mi) east of the south Island, it is found on the Chatham, Rangiuria and Rangatira Islands. It is in abundance on the southern tableland of Chatham Island in lowland forests and in the drier regions of swamps, as well as in the transition section between moorland and forest in association D. paludosum–particularly in its juvenile form. On Rangiuria Island, also known by its English name Pitt Island, D. arboreum dominates the upland forest with Rautini (Brachyglottis huntii) and various species of tree ferns.

It grows from close to sea level to 270 m (886 ft), on cliffs, hillsides, streams, gullies and valley floors. Typical vegetation in these areas is made up of forests, shrublands, bogs and grasslands, whilst the soil content is often boggy and peaty. D. arboreum typically prefers full sun, though will also grow in light shade. The New Zealand Threat Classification System classified it in 2017 as "Naturally Uncommon", giving it an estimated area of inhabitation of 10 km^{2} (1,000 ha). The forests it is found in are made up of mainly Plagianthus regius subsp. chathamicus, (Note: Venter describes it as Plagianthus chathamicus in his 2009 thesis, but it was demoted to a subspecies by Peter de Lange in 2008.) while the shrublands are made up of either: large-leaved muehlenbeckia (Muehlenbeckia australis); or species in the genus Coprosma together with Chatham Island aster (Olearia semidentata); or Olearia chathamica.

== Ecology ==
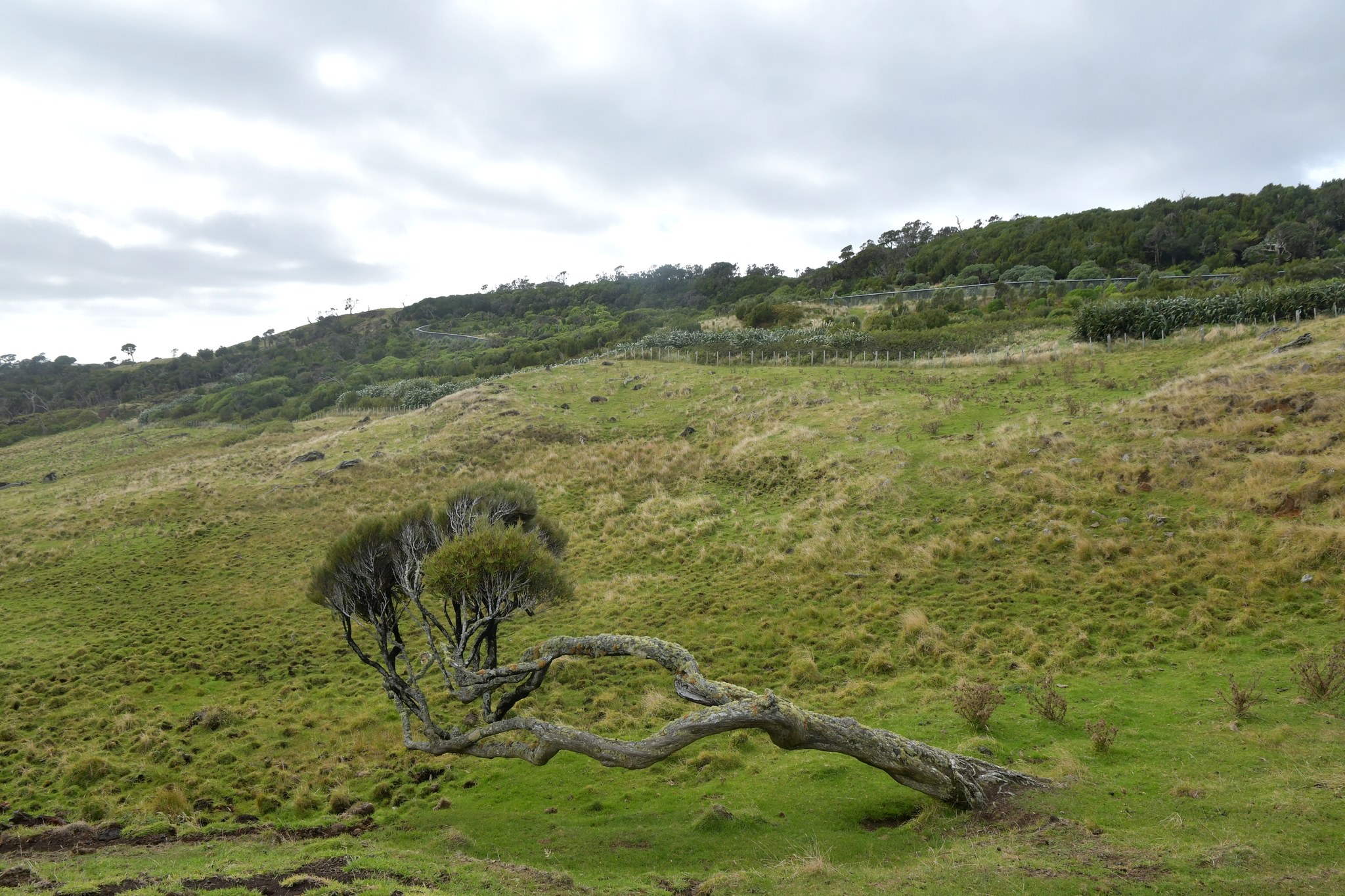
A windswept specimen

The Chatham Islands are extremely windswept, receiving an average annual wind speed of 24 km/h (13 kn) as well as having record wind speeds of 156 km/h (84 kn) in January 1993 and 124 km/h (67 kn) just a few months later. To adapt to this D. arboreum has evolved to be heteroblastic, developing large leaves as juveniles which become thin, wind-resistant needles as they gain maturity. Many species in mainland New Zealand are heteroblastic as well, such as the lancewood, but probably because of large, now extinct, browsing birds such as the moa. The Chatham Islands have never had these which means D. arboreum has likely evolved in this way due to climatic factors such as the wind; the thinner leaves reducing stress on the stalks.

D. arboreum can also grow as an epiphyte, beginning its life typically in a tree fern, before extending its roots downwards and eventually gaining a trunk.

== Cultivation ==
D. arboreum can be cultivated from seed but will be difficult to maintain and prefers a damp, acidic, peaty soil – like its habitat on Chatham Island.
