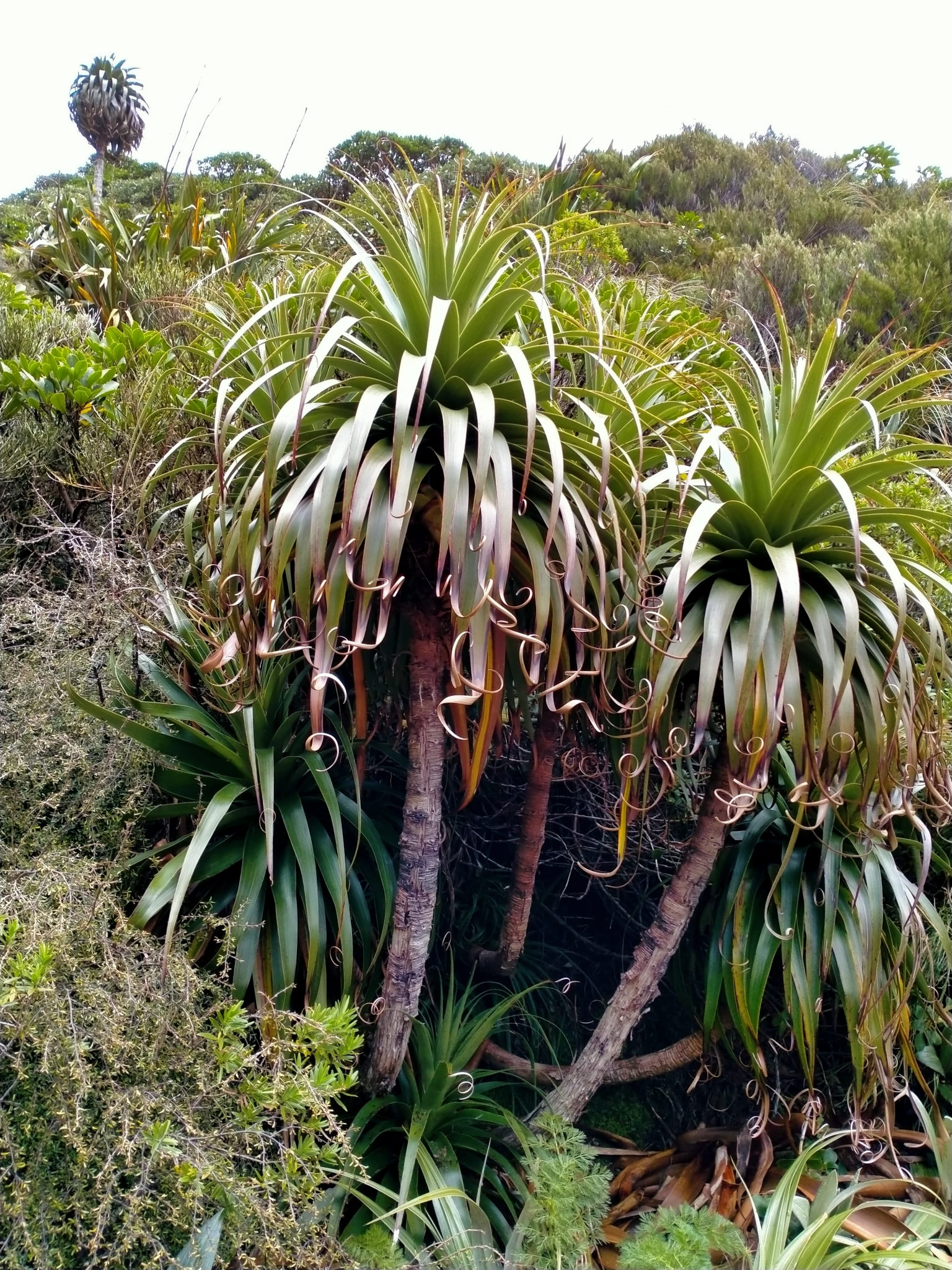

Conservation status
- Declining (NZ TCS)

Scientific classification
- Kingdom: Plantae
- Clade: Tracheophytes
- Clade: Angiosperms
- Clade: Eudicots
- Clade: Asterids
- Order: Ericales
- Family: Ericaceae
- Genus: Dracophyllum
- Species: D. fiordense

Binomial name
- Dracophyllum fiordense W.R.B.Oliv.
- Range

= Dracophyllum fiordense =

Fiordland grass tree

Species of flowering plant in the heath family

Dracophyllum fiordense, commonly known as the Fiordland grass tree, is a species of tree or shrub in the heath family, Ericaceae. It is endemic to the South Island of New Zealand. It reaches a height of 1.5–5.0 metres (5–16 feet) and has tufts of long green leaves at the ends of its branches. Each leaf has a distinctive curled spiral tip. D. fiordense has a pyramid-shaped inflorescence (flower spike) hidden under each clump of leaves, with between 113 and 120 pink flowers on each spike, and later reddish-brown dry fruit; both are around just 2 by 2 mm. It inhabits shrubland, lowland and subalpine forests, and tussock grassland of mountain slopes, gullies, and ridges. Its range covers two main areas: one in Fiordland National Park, and one in Aoraki / Mount Cook and Westland National Parks.

D. fiordense was first described by the New Zealand naturalist Walter Oliver in 1928 and placed by him in the subgenus Dracophyllum. A cladistic analysis using genetic sequencing was published in 2010, which revealed that D. fiordense is closely related to D. menziesii as Oliver had hypothesised. Its conservation status was assessed in 2023 as "Declining". The kākāpō, a flightless bird, feeds on the bases of the leaves by making careful incisions in new shoots. D. fiordense is likely pollinated by insects, and its seeds are later dispersed by the wind.

== Description ==
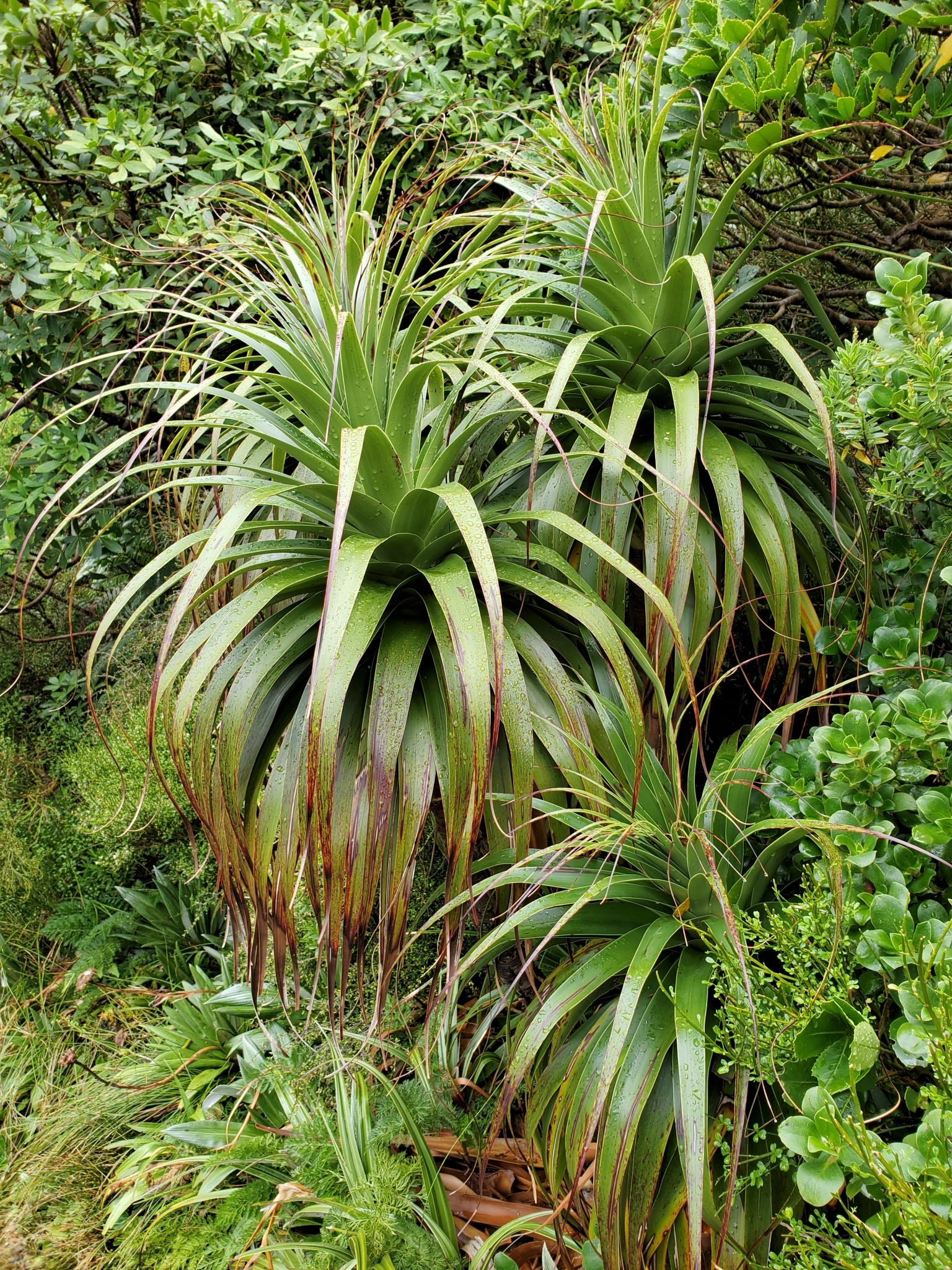
The foliage

Dracophyllum fiordense is a tree or tall shrub that grows to heights of 1.5–5.0 metres (5–16 feet). Though the trunk is usually unbranched, upright-growing branches may sometimes form, particularly on plants in Westland. The bark on older sections is a greyish-brown colour; newer growth is a yellow-brown. It is often very flaky and fragmented near the base of old stems. The leaves of D. fiordense are concentrated at the ends of branches, similar to species in the family Bromeliaceae, and are leathery, deeply grooved, and shaped like a triangle. They are 40–70 by 4–5 centimetres (16–28 by 1.6–2.0 inches) and have finely-toothed edges with 10–15 teeth every 1 cm (0.4 in). The tip of each leaf is pointed and curls in a distinctive spiral.

Flowering occurs from January to March, producing an inflorescence (flower spike) that is an axillary panicle: one that is many-branched and arises between the branch and the leaf. It is pyramid-shaped and much shorter than the leaves, drooping downwards to a length between 10 and 15 cm (4 and 6 in). The basal branch of the inflorescence extends horizontally outwards and is between 2 and 5 cm (0.8 and 2.0 in) long, and is covered in light green inflorescence bracts (specialised leaves). These bracts are egg-shaped to triangular at their bases and eventually fall off.

There are between 113 and 120 flowers on each panicle, grouped in sets of ten near the base. They hang from hairless 0.8–1.5 mm pedicels which have 4.5–5.0 by 0.8–10 mm hairless bracteoles (smaller bracts) in the middle, that later fall off. The sepals (leafy part of flower that protects it) are egg-shaped, 2.0–2.5 by 2.0–3.0 mm, which is shorter than the corolla tube, and grooved. The petals are a pinkish colour and form a 2.0–2.5 by 2.0–2.5 mm bell-shaped tube that becomes wider towards the mouth of the flower, and have reflexed lobes. The stamens are hypogynous and made up of a light yellow oblong 1.5–2.0 mm anther (pollen containing part) atop a 2.3–2.5 mm long filament. The flower has an almost globe-shaped ovary which is 0.9–1.0 by 1.3–1.5 mm, while the nectary scales are rectangularly shaped 0.6–0.7 by 0.6–0.7 mm. The style projects outwards and is 1.8–2.0 mm (0.07–0.08 in) long, hairless and five-lobed.

Fruiting occurs throughout the year, producing an egg-shaped brown 0.55–0.60 mm long seed which is encased within a 2.0–2.8 by 2.5–4.0 mm red-brown fruit. The fruit is globe shaped but pressed in on itself. Dracophyllum fiordense is similar to D. menziesii and D. townsonii in that its inflorescences develop below the clusters of leaves, though they are more branched than that of D. menziesii. D. traversii is also similar, but D. fiordense has a mostly unbranched stem, spiralled ends to its leaves, and an inflorescence occurring below the leaves.

== Taxonomy ==
- - - - - - - - D. acerosum
              - D. densum
              - D. filifolium
              - D. kirkii
              - D. ophioliticum
              - D. patens
              - D. rosmarinifolium
              - D. trimorphum
            - D. arboreum
            - D. longifolium
            - D. muscoides
            - D. pronum
            - D. scoparium
        - - D. strictum
    - - - - D. fiordense
          - D. menziesii
        - - D. latifolium
          - D. townsonii
      - - D. traversii
  - other Dracophyllum spp.

Cladogram showing the phylogeny of selected species within the genus Dracophyllum, from research published in 2010.
Subgenus Oreothamnus
Subgenus Dracophyllum

Dracophyllum fiordense was first described by the New Zealand naturalist and ornithologist Walter Oliver (1883–1957) in the 1928 issue of Transactions and Proceedings of the New Zealand Institute, (Note: This journal is now called the "Transactions and Proceedings of the Royal Society of New Zealand.") published in 1929. He noted, in what was the first major monograph of the genus, that its leaves were "the largest of all the species of Dracophyllum," and concentrated in "an immense cluster at the top of the stem." Oliver claimed it had been known by others for some years before he collected it in March 1927 on Wilmot saddle and Mount Barber. The type specimen was collected on Wilmot saddle on the Wilmot pass, (Note: The code for the lectotype in the Te Papa Tongarewa herbarium is (WELT) "55115," and the record can be found here.) which Oliver designated in a 1952 supplement to his original article. It is, hence, a lectotype, since he did not provide a holotype in his original article.

=== Etymology ===
The etymology of Dracophyllum is from its similarity to the unrelated and more widespread genus Dracaena, which stems from the Ancient Greek for "dragon-leaf". The specific epithet fiordense is the Latinisation of the word "Fiordland" for the Fiordland region, one of the species' two main distribution locations. It is commonly known as the Fiordland grass tree.

=== Classification and evolution ===
In 1928, Oliver published his first attempt to establish subgenera for Dracophyllum and placed D. fiordense in the subgenus Dracophyllum (then called Eudracophyllum) in the group of D. menziesii, together with D. menziesii and D. townsonii. He cited the way its panicles form below its terminal cluster of leaves as enough to move it into that group; this placement was unchanged in his 1952 supplement.

Several studies have examined the relationships within Dracophyllum using genetic sequencing, though the largest of these was Wagstaff et al. 2010. Cladistics was used to produce a phylogenetic tree of the tribe Richeeae, and other species, using genetic sequencing. The tree was established through the combination of rbcL and matK bases. They found that only Dracophyllum subg. Oreothamnus and the tribe Richeeae were monophyletic. The paraphyly of the genus Dracophyllum, as well as the polyphyly of the closely related genus Richea, they argued, suggested that a major taxonomic revision was required. The botanist Stephanus Venter revised the genus in 2021. D. fiordense is kept in the subgenus Dracophyllum under his assessment. Dracophyllum fiordense is most closely related to D. menziesii, though is also part of a larger group (clade) that share a common ancestor, which includes D. traversii, D. townsonii and D. latifolium. Its placement can be summarised in the cladogram at right.

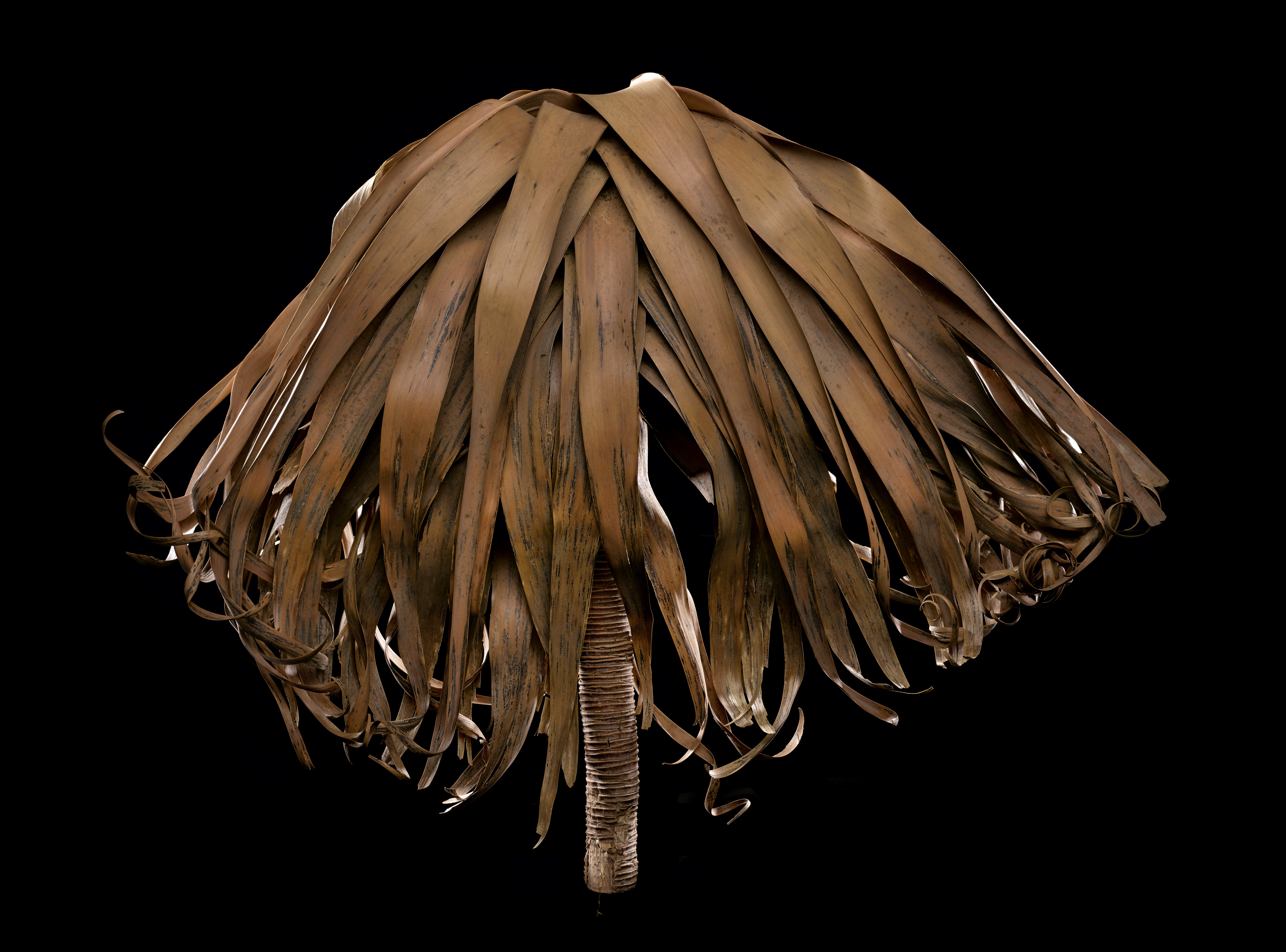
The lectotype in the Te Papa herbarium

== Distribution and habitat ==
=== Distribution ===
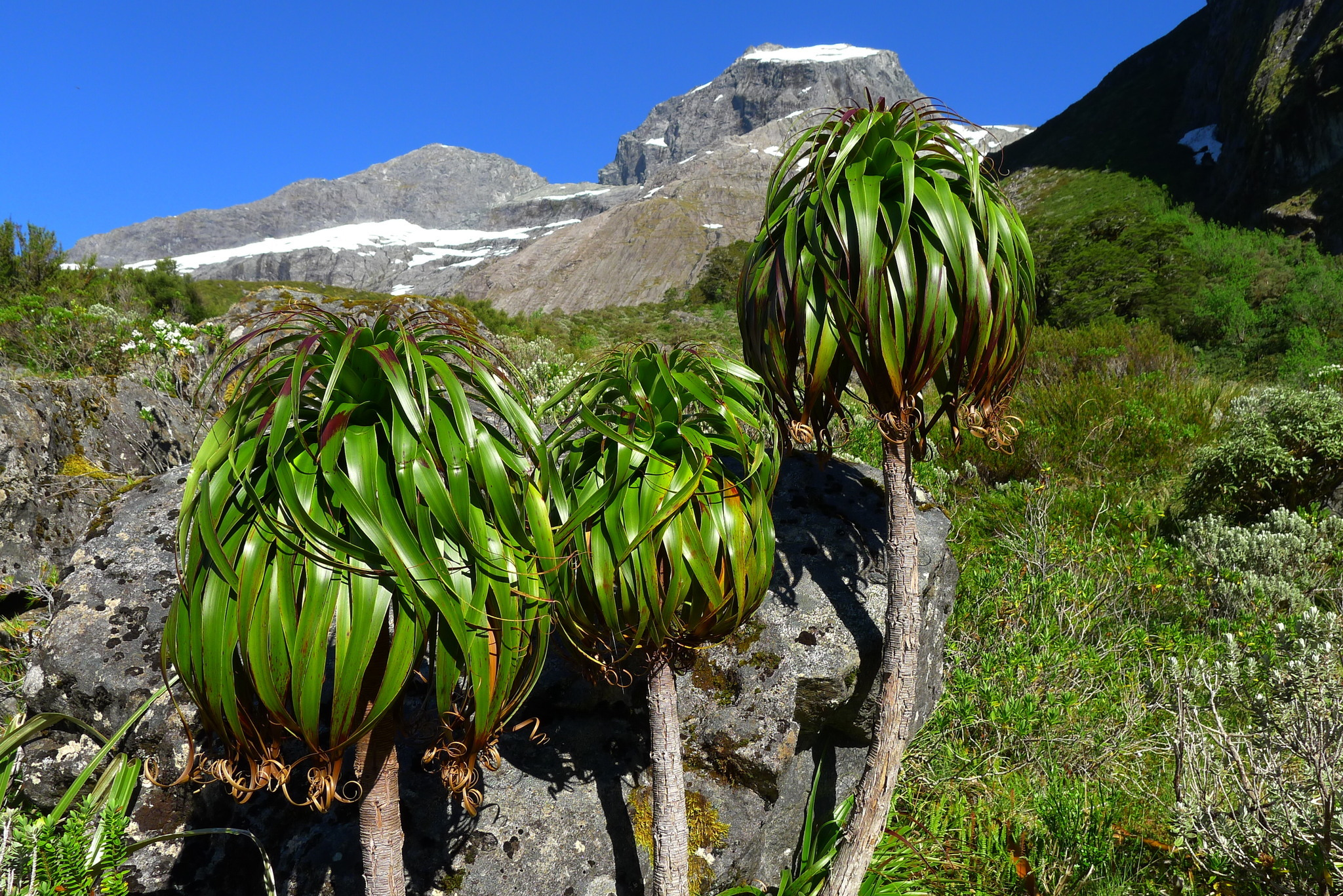
D. fiordense in an alpine environment in the Humboldt Mountains, Otago

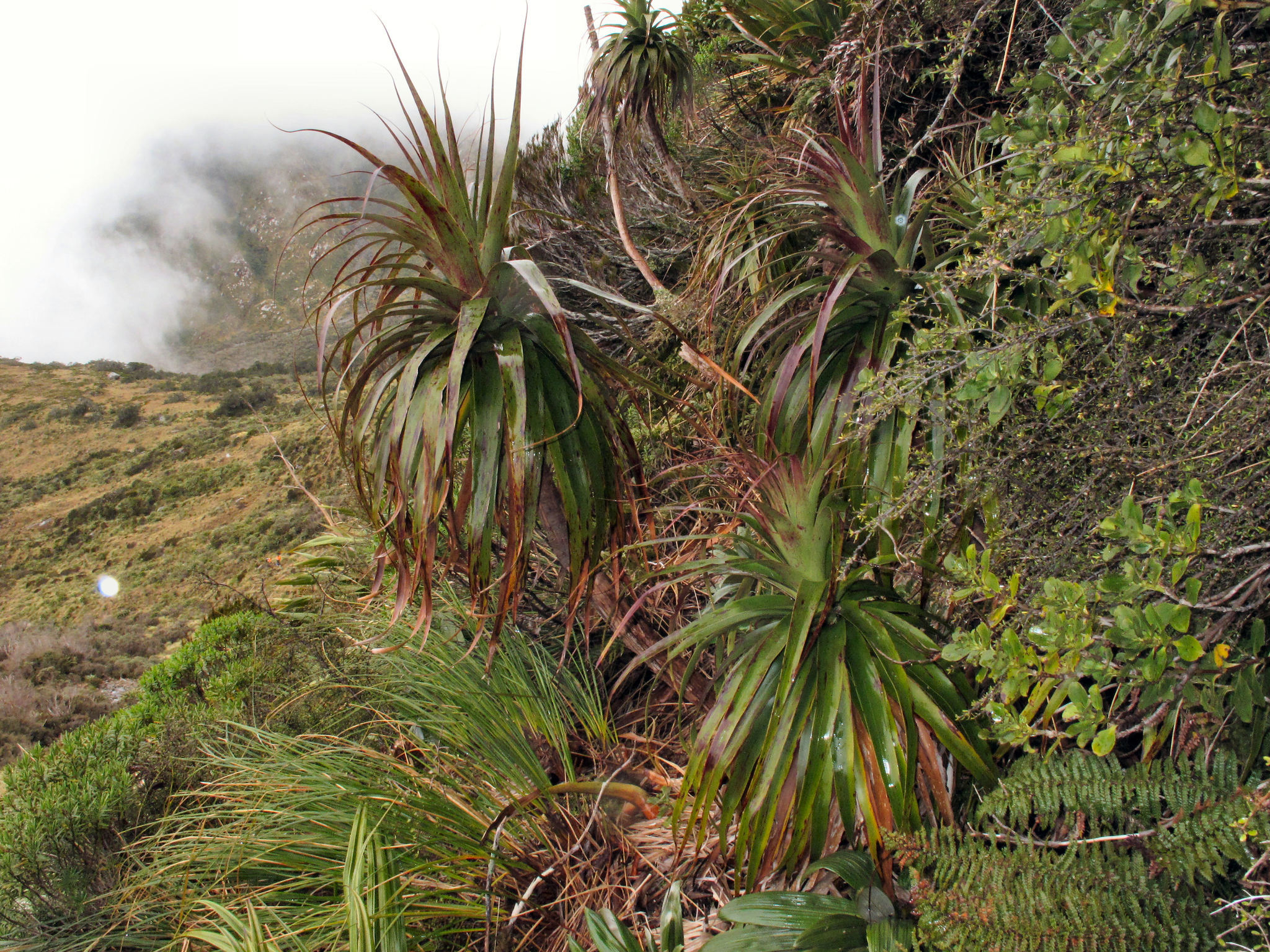
D. fiordense amongst grasses and other plants in the Franklin Mountains, Fiordland

Dracophyllum fiordense is endemic to the Fiordland and western Otago regions in the South Island of New Zealand and occurs in two main populations. The first is in the Mount Cook and Westland National Parks and the second is in Fiordland National Park. Research by David A. Norton published in 2018 in New Zealand Journal of Botany found that it occurs much further north than previously recorded. Norton found the species occurring 60 to 75 kilometres (37 to 47 miles) further north (a 15% increase) than its previously known range, in the Waitaha and Hokitika River catchments. He hypothesised that this change in range was due either to: misidentification as D. traversii; simply not being found earlier; or more recent movement of the species further north. The third possibility, he suggested, may be a result of it evolving from glacial events from the south of the South Island; hence, it "may still be spreading northwards."

Venter recorded in his 2009 thesis and 2021 revision of the genus that plants from the southern population, found in Fiordland, tend to have few or no branches off the main stem, with longer leaves and larger fruit than those of the other population. He hypothesised that this may be due to the higher elevation, as, for example, plants from valleys on Mount Alexander reach 5 m (16 ft), whereas others in more alpine regions reach just 50 cm (2 ft). The northern population, in Westland, typically has many-branched stems, much smaller fruit and shorter leaves. Norton claimed he had not seen individuals with as many branches as Venter had illustrated in his thesis in the northern population. The branches off the main stem, according to Norton, are only rarely present in southern plants, and when they are, they occur at the base of the plant.

=== Habitat ===
Dracophyllum fiordense grows on 50˚–80˚ steep mountain slopes from 50 to 1,280 m (160 to 4,200 ft). It typically occurs on north, north-west, or north-eastern facing slopes in gullies, ravines, ridges, or bluffs. Vegetation in these areas is commonly made up of moist lowland and subalpine forest, shrubland, or tussock grassland. Tree cover comes from silver beech (Nothofagus menziesii), tūpare (Macrolearia colensoi), mountain flax (Phormium cookianum), or tussock grasses (from the genus Chionochloa). Soil content is principally a brown clay loam formed from schist and gneiss and is often rich in humus. D. fiordense usually prefers sunny areas, but sometimes it can be found in places with light shade. Despite these regions having high rainfall, the plant also can gain moisture from the mist. A 2023 assessment using the New Zealand Threat Classification System classified it as "Declining", with an estimated habitat area less than 100 km^{2} (39 sq mi; 10,000 ha).

== Ecology ==
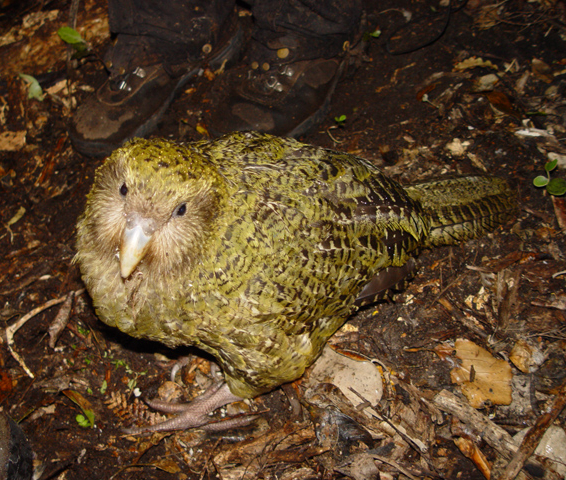
The kākāpō feeds on the fleshy leaf bases of D. fiordense.

Dracophyllum fiordense is one of several species that the flightless bird kākāpō (Strigops habroptilus), feeds on. One 1977 thesis found "kākāpō signs", or chew marks, caused by the lower mandible on the lateral buds (shoots) of D. fiordense. The technique they employ – specifically on D. fiordense – is an incision into the leaf buds with their beaks followed by eating the leaf bases through the incision. In the Fiordland region, which was where the kākāpō's last wild population was located (before subsequent conservation efforts), D. fiordense, along with other Fiordland Dracophyllum species such as D. menziesii, D. longifolium, and D. uniflorum, is an important source of food for the parrot.

The seeds of D. fiordense are small enough to be dispersed by the wind and one 2010 paper in New Zealand Journal of Ecology concluded pollination is likely achieved by insects. Species flammability within the Dracophyllum genus was analysed in a 2020 study published in New Phytologist. D. fiordense was found to be one of the least flammable plants across the genus, attaining the lowest burning time, mean maximum temperature, ignition score, and mean burnt biomass, and conversely having the greatest mean moisture content in its leaves. Since D. menziesii, its closest relative, grows in drier open areas and is more flammable than D. fiordense, which grows in high rainfall forests and shrubland and has low flammability, researchers suggested that this trait may have been determined by the species' environment. Deer were found to feed on D. fiordense in two studies, conducted in 1975 and 1982 respectively, on Secretary Island in Fiordland. The first study found its foliage was eaten the 17th most; the second found that its branches were the 10th most chewed, among other plants in the area.
