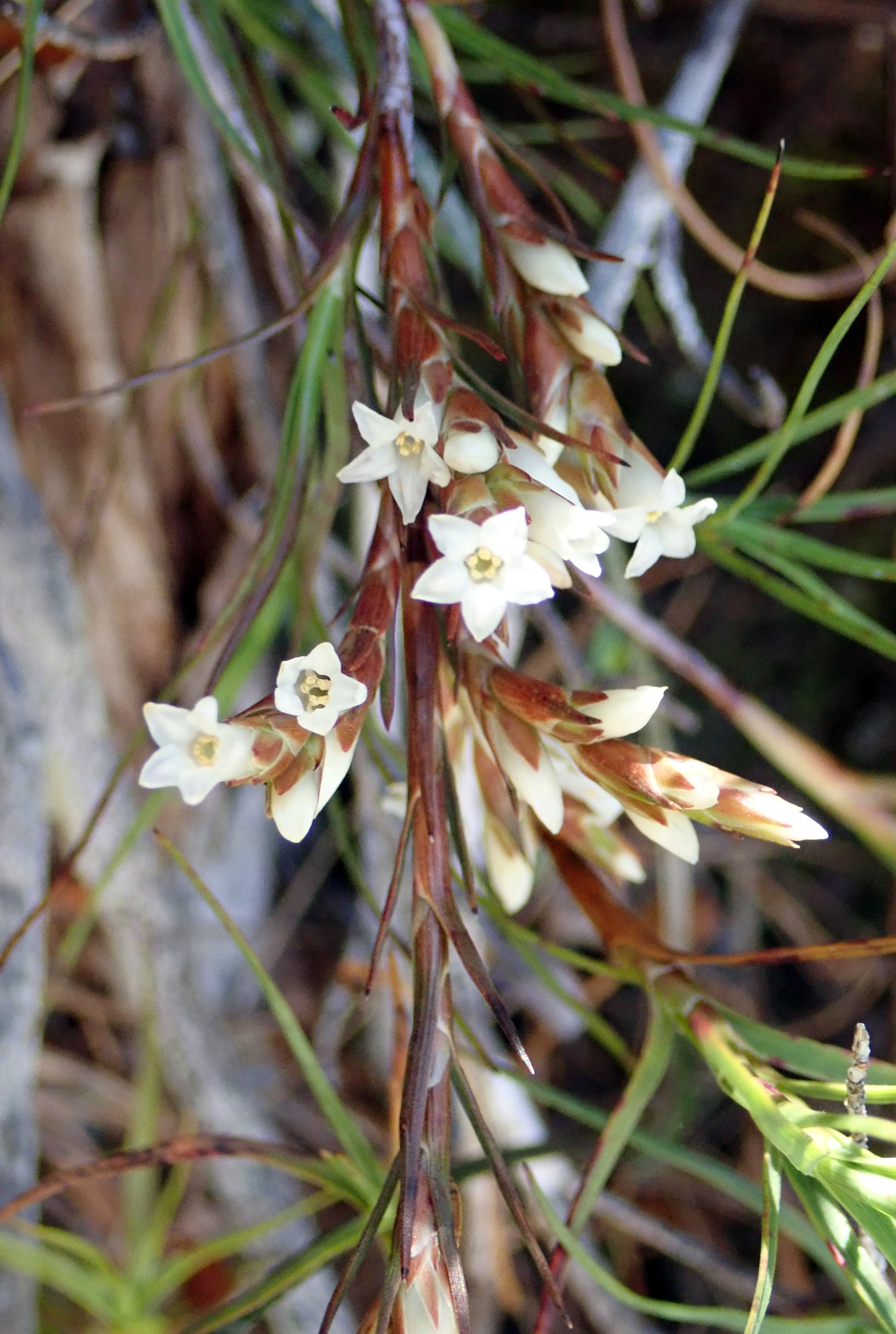

Conservation status
- Naturally Uncommon (NZ TCS)

Scientific classification
- Kingdom: Plantae
- Clade: Tracheophytes
- Clade: Angiosperms
- Clade: Eudicots
- Clade: Asterids
- Order: Ericales
- Family: Ericaceae
- Genus: Dracophyllum
- Species: D. ophioliticum

Binomial name
- Dracophyllum ophioliticum S.Venter

= Dracophyllum ophioliticum =

Species of shrub

Dracophyllum ophioliticum, commonly known as asbestos inaka and asbestos turpentine tree, is a species of shrub in the family Ericaceae. Endemic to the South Island of New Zealand, it grows into a sprawling shrub, reaching heights of just 30–200 cm (10–80 in), and has leaves which form bunches at the end of its branches.

D. ophioliticum flowers from January to March, producing small white flowers and later tiny light brown fruit. It has a range restricted to north-west Nelson in the Kahurangi National Park, growing only on serpentinite-asbestos clay loam. It was first described by Stephanus Venter in 2002 and genetically sequenced in 2010 when it was placed in the subgenus Oreothamnus.

== Description ==
D. ophioliticum grows into a decumbent shrub between 30 and 100 cm tall, though can reach 200 cm in shade, with grey and slightly fissured bark. Its leaves concentrate at the end of branches, and are sheathed in waxy light green leaf sheaths. Enclosed in the sheaths are 2–50 by 1–2.5 mm leaves which are very finely serrate, with 10–13 teeth every cm. The leaves also have tiny warts, are slightly concave shaped, and leathery, with a waxy powder covering them.

Flowering occurs from January through to March, producing 3–9 white flowers on each 13–28 mm (0.51–1.10 in) long rectangular raceme. The flowers themselves are made up of 4–6 by 1.5–3.0 mm (0.16–0.24 by 0.06–0.12 in) green sepals which enclose a 5.5–6.5 by 2.0–2.5 white hairless corolla. In the upper third of the corolla tube is the stamen, which is made up of a 0.1 mm long light yellow anther suspended off of a 0.5 mm long filament. In order to provide an incentive for pollination D. ophioliticum has 1.0–1.2 by 0.6–0.7 mm rectangular nectary scales.

The ovary is 1.5 by 1.5 mm egg-shaped and hairless, eventually leading to the creation of yellowish-brown 0.8–1.0 mm long seeds enclosed within 2.7–4.0 by 2.5–2.7 mm light brown capsules which are dispersed by the wind.

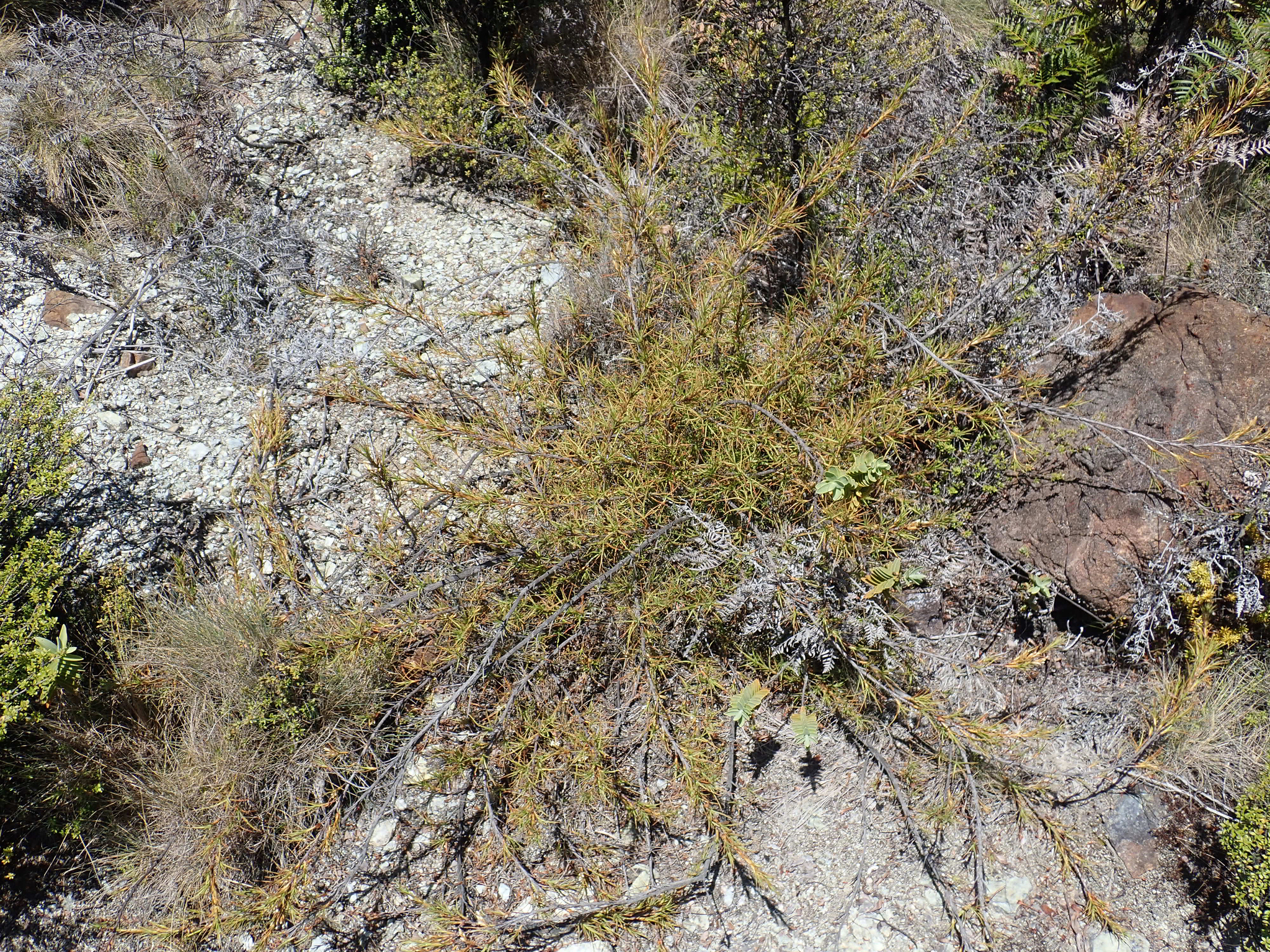
The growth habit

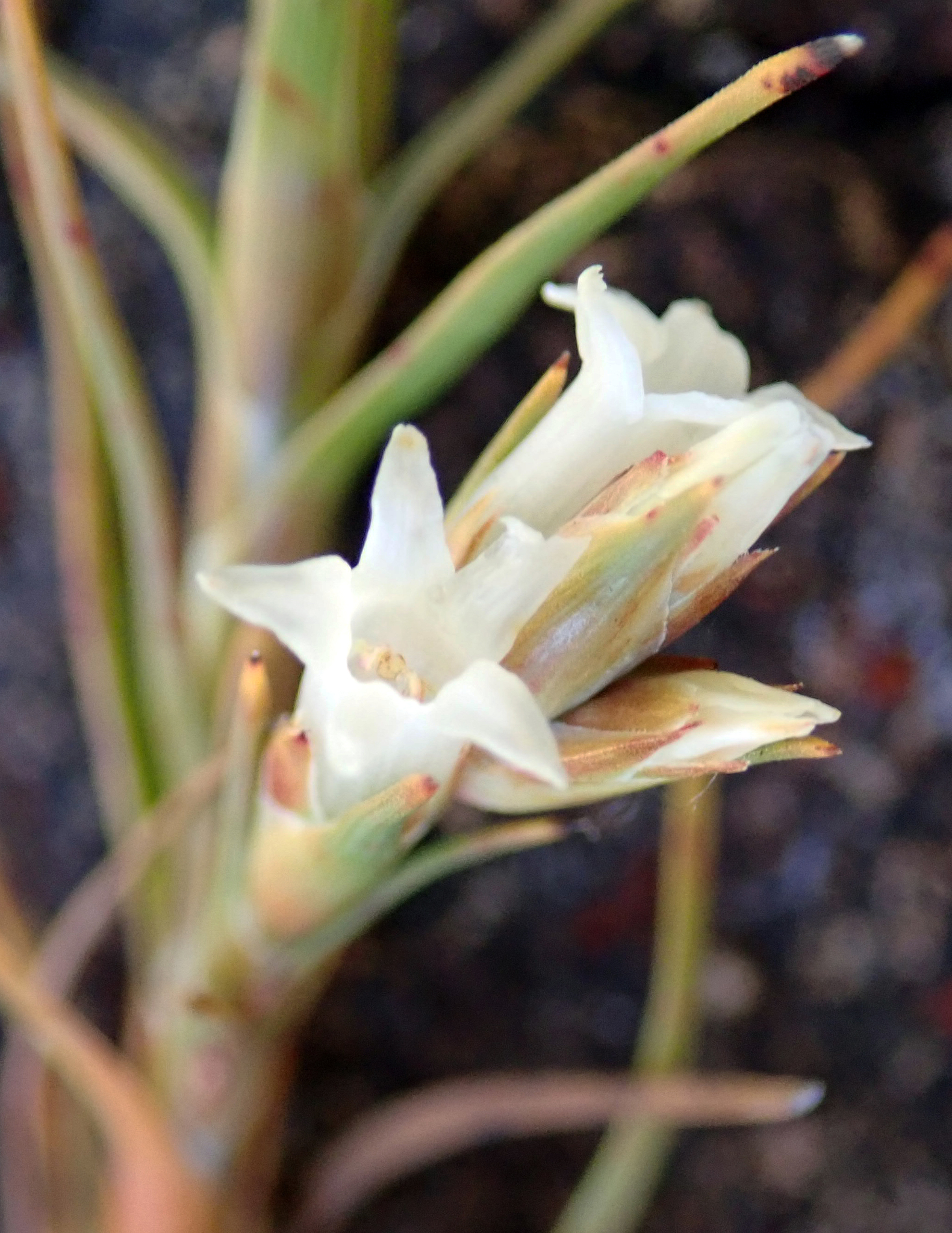
A close-up of the flowers

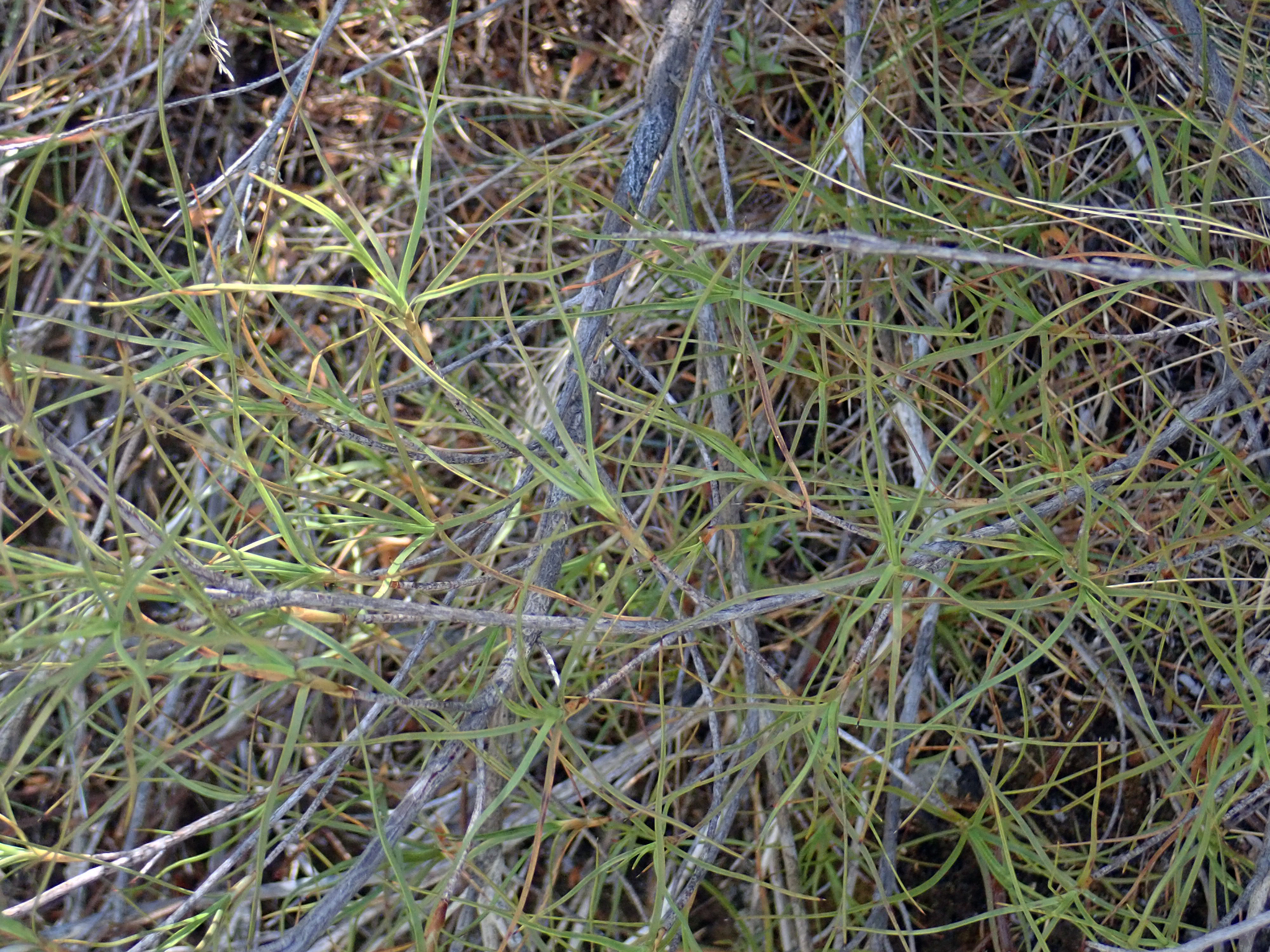
Leaves and stems

== Taxonomy ==
- - - - - - - - D. acerosum
              - D. densum
              - D. filifolium
              - D. kirkii
              - D. ophioliticum
              - D. patens
              - D. rosmarinifolium
              - D. trimorphum
            - D. arboreum
            - D. longifolium
            - D. muscoides
            - D. pronum
            - D. scoparium
        - - D. strictum
    - - - - D. fiordense
          - D. menziesii
        - - D. latifolium
          - D. townsonii
      - - D. traversii
  - other Dracophyllum spp.

Cladogram showing the phylogeny of selected species within the genus Dracophyllum, from research published in 2010.
Subgenus Oreothamnus
Subgenus Dracophyllum

D. ophioliticum was first described by the botanist Stephanus Venter in a 2002 article in the New Zealand Journal of Botany. Before being formally described it was often confused for D. longifolium var. longifolium but Venter argued its complete lack of the latter's large juvenile leaves and caducous floral bracts set it apart. It is also similar to D. filifolium, both having similar leaves and persistent floral bracts, but can be distinguished by its many stems and decumbent growth habit as well as its leaves having warts and white hairs, among other differences.

=== Etymology ===
Dracophyllum is from the genus's similarity to the species in the genus Dracaena from the Canary Islands and is from the Ancient Greek for "dragon-leaf." The specific epithet ophioliticum is Ancient Greek for "lover of serpentine" and describes the Serpentine rock which it exclusively grows on.

=== Phylogeny ===
In a 2010 article in the Annals of the Missouri Botanical Garden, a team of several botanists, including Venter, used genetic evidence to perform a cladistic analysis and create a complete phylogeny of the tribe Richeeae and other closely related species. They found that only the subgenus Oreothamnus, pictured below, was monophyletic and that there was strong genetic evidence for D. ophioliticum's clade. The paraphyly of the genus Dracophyllum, as well as the polyphyly of the closely related genus Richea, they argued, suggested that a major taxonomic revision was required. Stephanus Venter revised the genus in 2021, merging the genus Richea into two subgenera, named D. Subg. Cystanthe and D. Subg. Dracophylloides, of Dracophyllum. Though he noted that because the 2010 study was based on plastid sequence data and did not attain some species with strong enough evidence, the subgenera are instead based on morphological characteristics.

D. ophioliticum's placement can be summarised in the cladogram at right.

== Distribution and habitat ==
D. ophioliticum is endemic to the South Island of New Zealand and is found only in the Tākaka and Cobb Valleys of Kahurangi National Park. It grows exclusively on Serpentine rocks which have Asbestos veins from around 457 – 1000 m above sea level on reddish-brown clay loams, which are areas in which rocks have turned into clay over time. Most plants are found on steep open slopes, though some can also grow in rock crevices in the middle of forest.

== Ecology ==
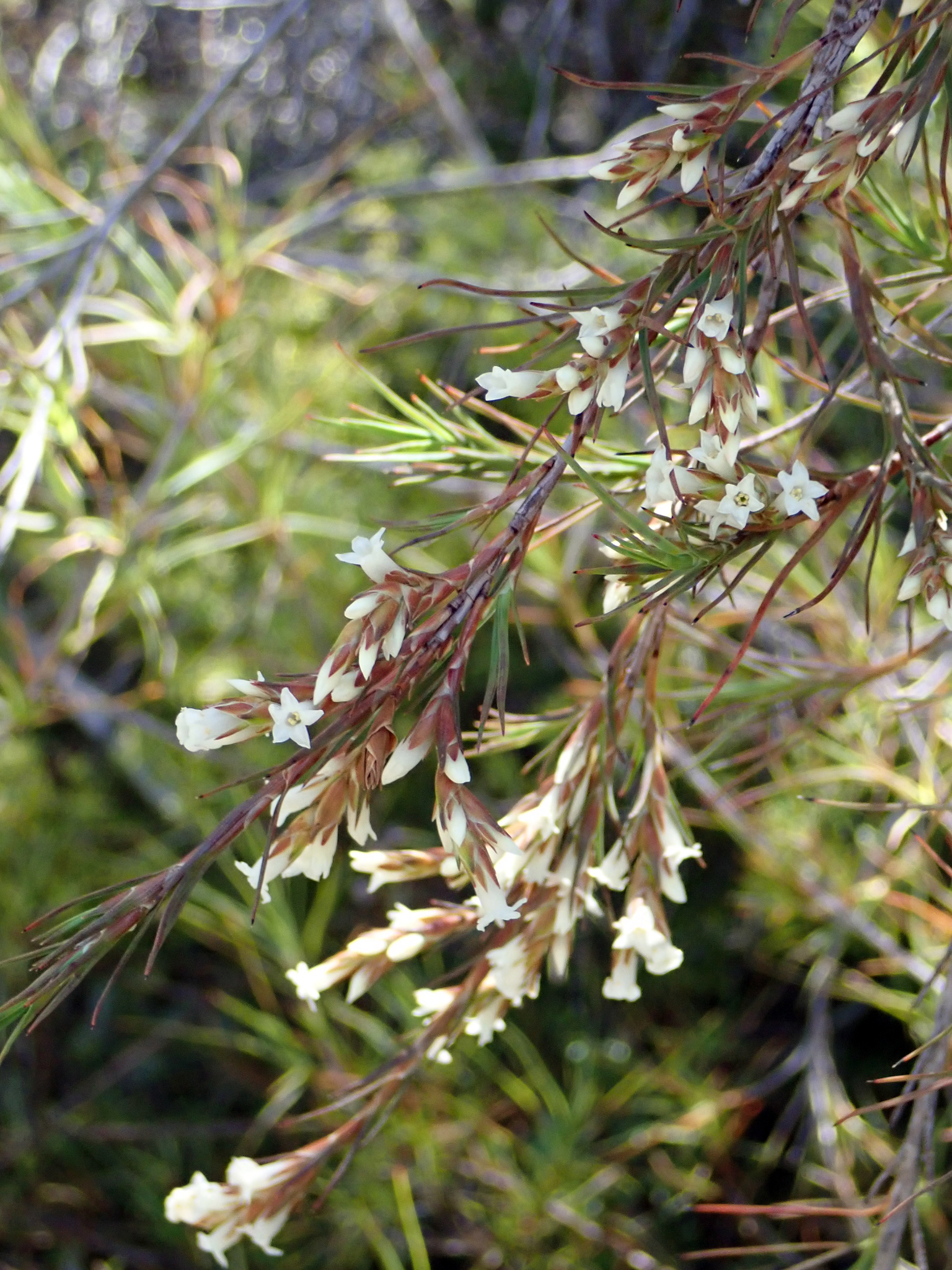
A branch in flower

D. ophioliticum often grows in association with a large number of plants including: Leptospermum scoparium, Veronica albicans, Phormium cookianum subsp. cookianum, Griselinia littoralis, Astelia fragrans, Cyathodes juniperina var. juniperina, Phyllocladus trichomanoides, Exocarpos bidwillii, Pseudopanax crassifolius, Melicytus alpinus, Gaultheria antipoda, Coprosma microcarpa, C. perpusilla subsp. perpusilla, Hebe masoniae, and Dianella nigra. The forest that they may be found in, though to a lesser extent than the open slopes which they mainly inhabit, are made up of mostly Leptospermum scoparium, Veronica albicans, and Coprosma microcarpa. Although it may also grow in association with the similar species D. filifolium and D. urvilleanum, there is no evidence of hybridisation between them.

In order to survive in the clay loam, a soil type which is easily eroded and changed by the weather, many plants develop roots at the nodes of their stems to better stay fixed into the ground.
