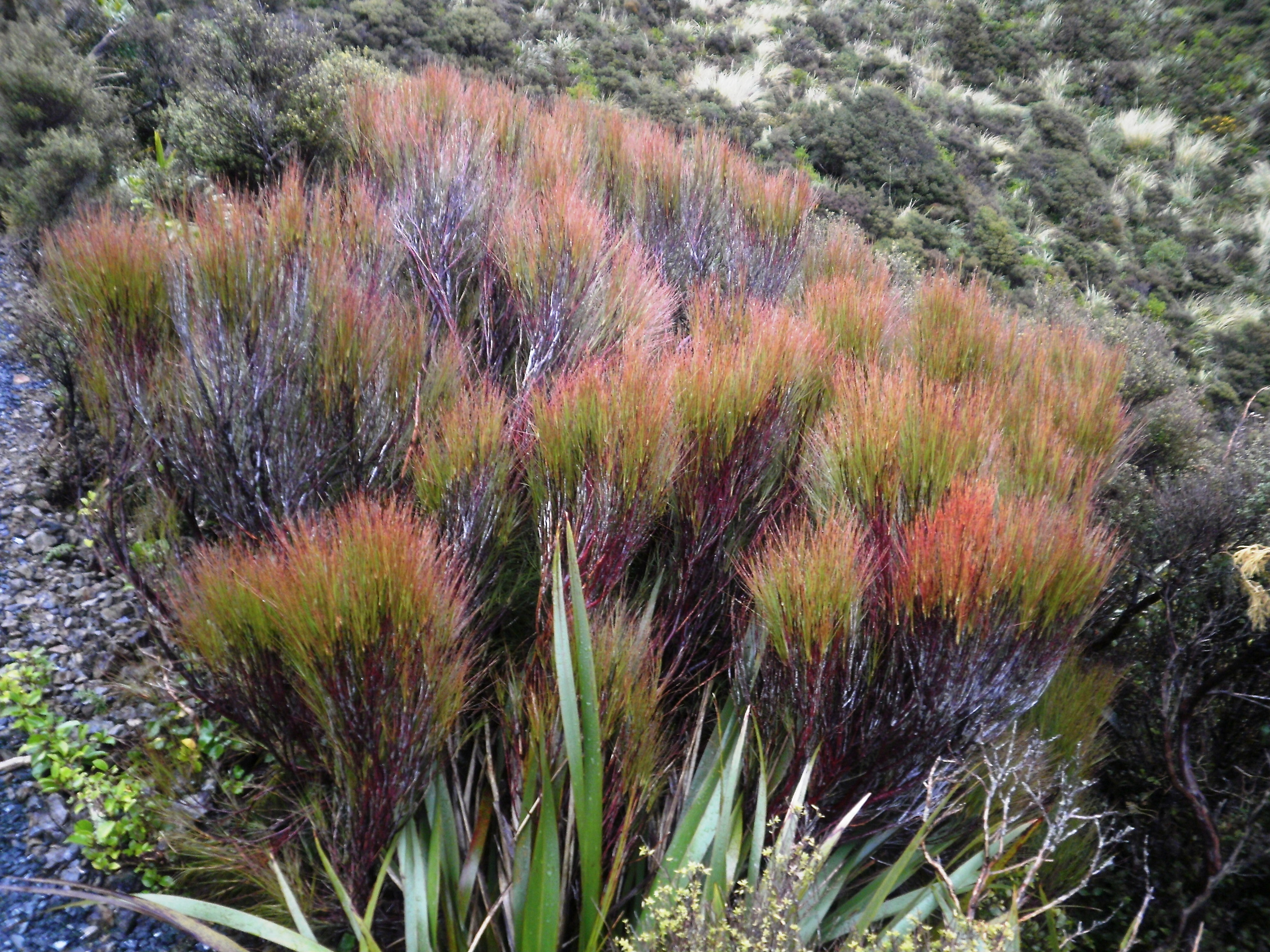

Conservation status
- Least Concern (IUCN 3.1)

Scientific classification
- Kingdom: Plantae
- Clade: Tracheophytes
- Clade: Angiosperms
- Clade: Eudicots
- Clade: Asterids
- Order: Ericales
- Family: Ericaceae
- Genus: Dracophyllum
- Species: D. longifolium

Binomial name
- Dracophyllum longifolium (J.R.Forst., G.Forst.) R.Br. ex Roem. & Schult.

Synonyms
- Dracophyllum lyallii Hook.f. Epacris frondosa Gaertn. Epacris longifolia J.R.Forst. & G.Forst.

= Dracophyllum longifolium =

Species of flowering plant

Dracophyllum longifolium, commonly called inaka (from Māori), is an upright shrub or small tree in the family Ericaceae that is endemic to New Zealand.

Dracophyllum longifolium grows mostly in the South Island but is found throughout New Zealand from sea level up to 1,200 metres (3,900 ft). Inaka occurs in open forests where it can grow as high as 12 metres and in sub-alpine areas it generally reaches 1–1.5 metres (3 ft 3 in – 4 ft 11 in).

== Description ==
Dracophyllum longifolium has thin branches that become marked with rings as old leaves die. The needle-like long leaves are 3–5 millimetres (0.12–0.20 in) wide and up to 25 centimetres (9.8 in) long with a pointed tip and are often softly coloured from green through to orange and brown.

Inaka is a long-lived plant and can survive for up to 220 years.

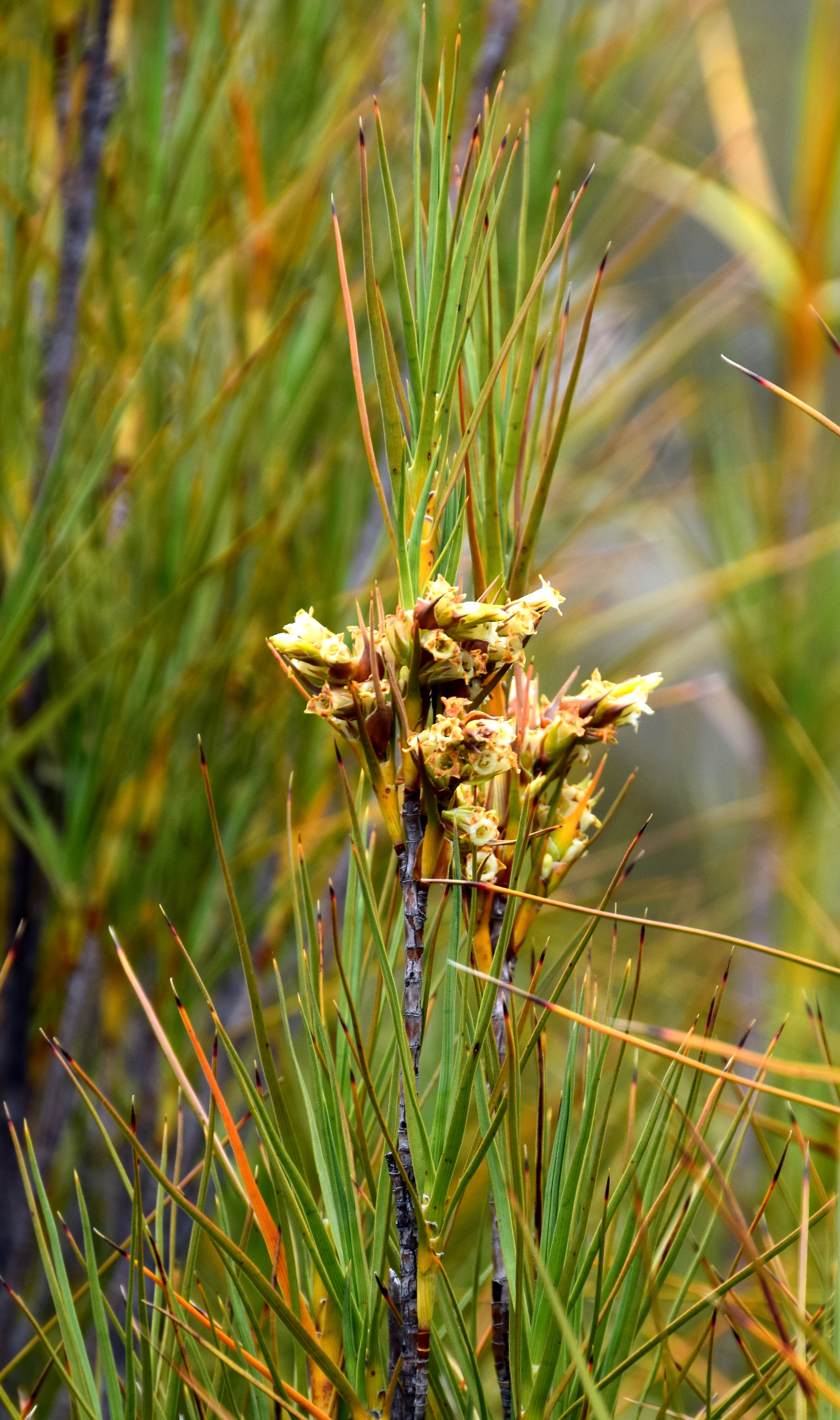
Flowers

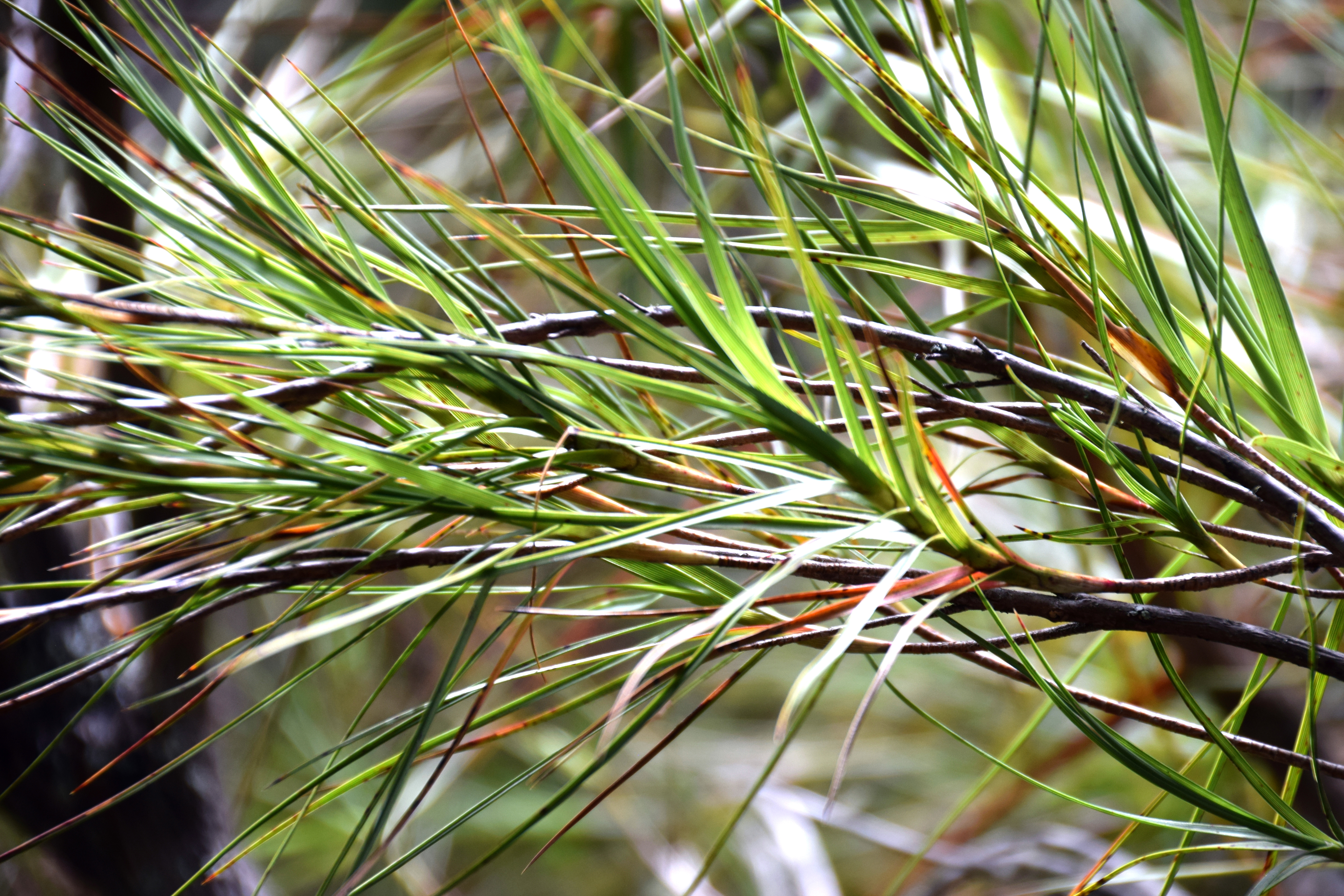
Adult leaves

== Taxonomy ==
=== Varieties ===
This species has the following varieties:

- Dracophyllum longifolium var. longifolium
- Dracophyllum longifolium var. septentrionale

=== Phylogeny ===
- - - - - - - - D. acerosum
              - D. densum
              - D. filifolium
              - D. kirkii
              - D. ophioliticum
              - D. patens
              - D. rosmarinifolium
              - D. trimorphum
            - D. arboreum
            - D. longifolium
            - D. muscoides
            - D. pronum
            - D. scoparium
        - - D. strictum
    - - - - D. fiordense
          - D. menziesii
        - - D. latifolium
          - D. townsonii
      - - D. traversii
  - other Dracophyllum spp.

Cladogram showing the phylogeny of selected species within the genus Dracophyllum, from research published in 2010.
Subgenus Oreothamnus
Subgenus Dracophyllum

In a 1952 supplement of the Transactions and Proceedings of the Royal Society of New Zealand, New Zealand botanist W. R. B. Oliver published a revised taxonomic arrangement of the genus Dracophyllum which he had first attempted in 1928. In this supplement he placed D. longifolium in a group with D. oliveri within the subgenus Oreothemanus. Oliver, however, conducted his research based purely on morphological characteristics such as growth habit, leaves, and flowers. In 2010 a team of several botanists, including Stephanus Venter, published an article on the genus Dracophyllum in the Annals of the Missouri Botanical Garden. In it they performed a cladistic analysis and produced a phylogenetic tree of the tribe Richeeae and other species using genetic sequencing. They found that only the subgenus Oreothamnus as well as the tribe Richeeae were monophyletic. The paraphyly of the genus Dracophyllum, as well as the polyphyly of the closely related genus Richea, they argued, suggested that a major taxonomic revision was required. Stephanus Venter revised the genus in 2021, merging the genus Richea into two subgenera, named D. subg. Cystanthe and D. subg. Dracophylloides, of Dracophyllum. Though he noted that because the 2010 study was based on plastid sequence data and did not attain some species with strong enough evidence, the subgenera are instead based on morphological characteristics. D. longifolium's placement can be summarised in the cladogram at right.

== Conservation status ==
In both 2009 and 2012, D. longifolium var. longifolium was deemed to be "Not Threatened" under the New Zealand Threat Classification System, and this New Zealand classification was reaffirmed in 2018. However, D. longifolium var. septentrionale was classified as "At Risk - Naturally Uncommon" in 2012, and in 2018.
