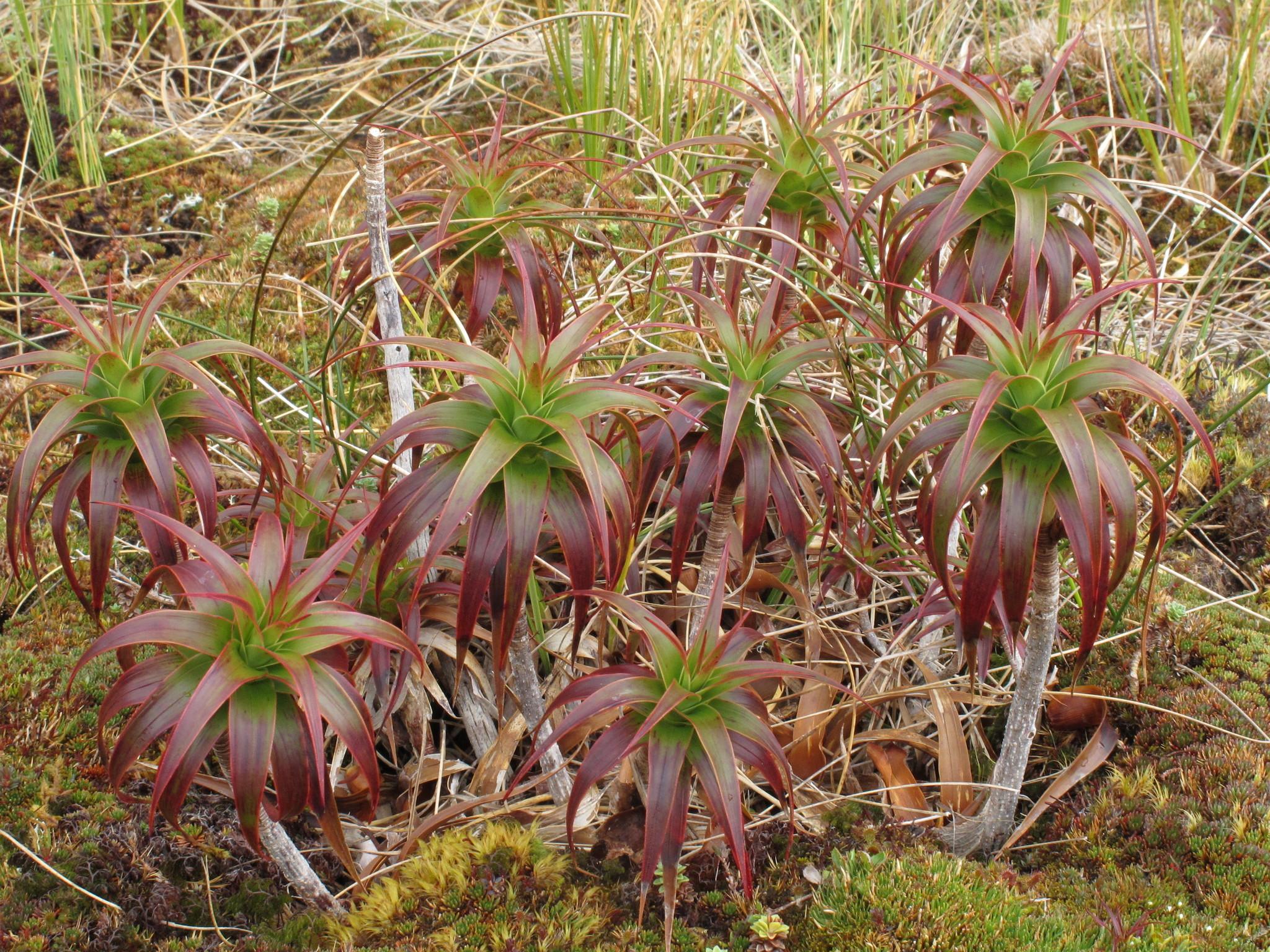

Scientific classification
- Kingdom: Plantae
- Clade: Tracheophytes
- Clade: Angiosperms
- Clade: Eudicots
- Clade: Asterids
- Order: Ericales
- Family: Ericaceae
- Genus: Dracophyllum
- Species: D. menziesii

Binomial name
- Dracophyllum menziesii Hook.f.
- Range

= Dracophyllum menziesii =

Species of flowering plant in the heath family

Dracophyllum menziesii, commonly known as pineapple scrub, is a species of shrub endemic to the South and Stewart Islands of New Zealand. In the heath family Ericaceae, it inhabits mountain slopes and cliffs from sea level up to 1,500 m (4,900 ft) and reaches a height of 0.5–1 m (1.6–3.3 ft). A 2017 assessment using the New Zealand Threat Classification System classified it as "Not Threatened", giving it an estimated population upwards of 100,000.

== Description ==
Dracophyllum menziesii is a shrub between 0.5–1 m (1.6–3.3 ft) tall. The bark on older sections is a grey colour; newer growth is a brown. It is generally smooth, though may occasionally be fragmented at the base of the plant. The leaves of D. menziesii are concentrated at the ends of branches, similar to species in the family Bromeliaceae, and are attached to the stem by 1–2 by 1.7–2 cm light brown leathery sheaths (base of leaf). They are ridged, taper to a point and have edges that are membrane-like and smooth. The rest of the leaf is also leathery, 9–22 by 0.9–1.7 cm (3.5–8.7 by 0.4–0.7 in) in size, and is triangle-shaped. Its surfaces are hairless and have deep grooves or ridges; the edges resemble cartilage and have 20–32 teeth every cm. Its leaf apices are thickened and come to a distinct point.

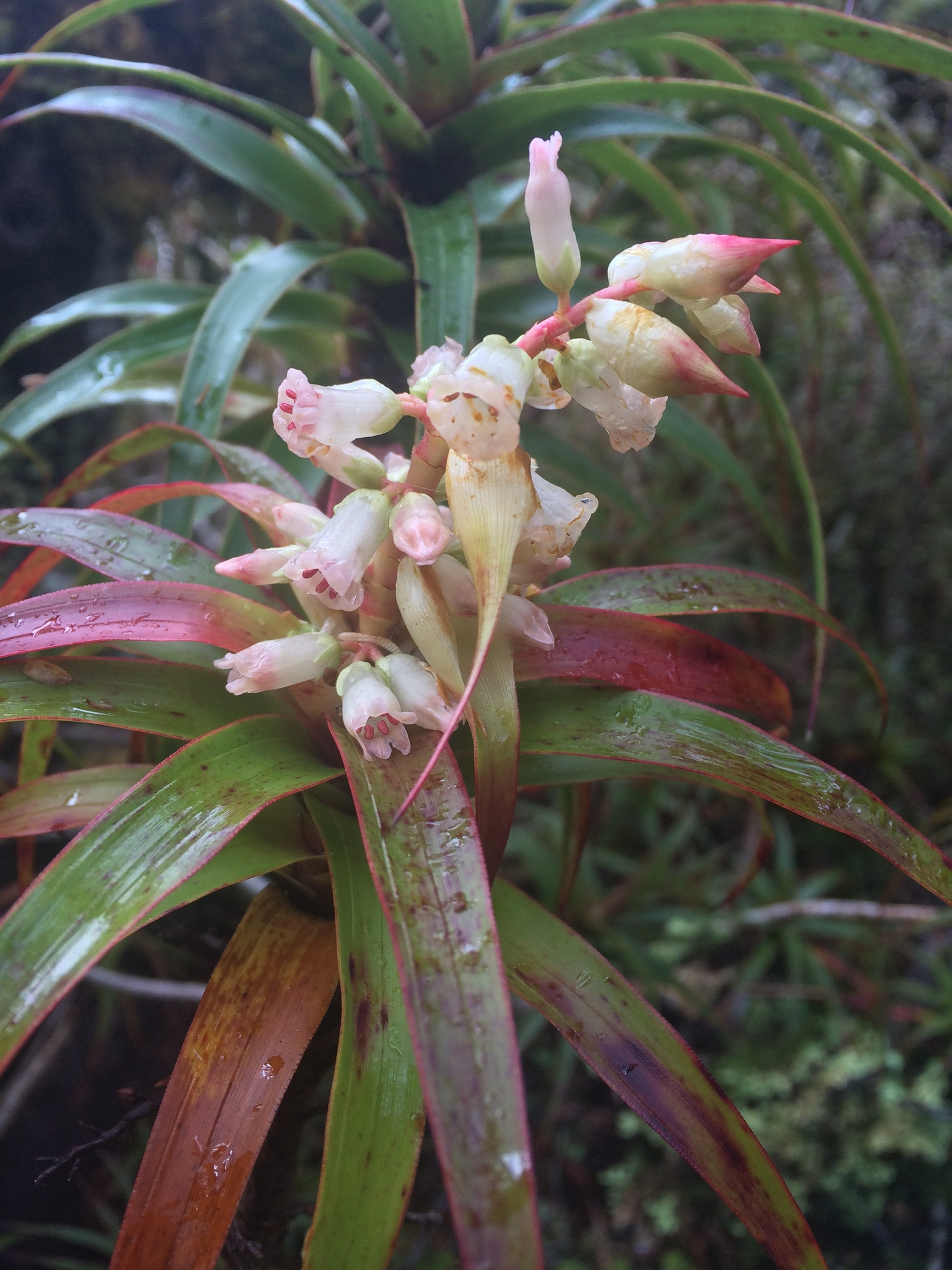
The inflorescence

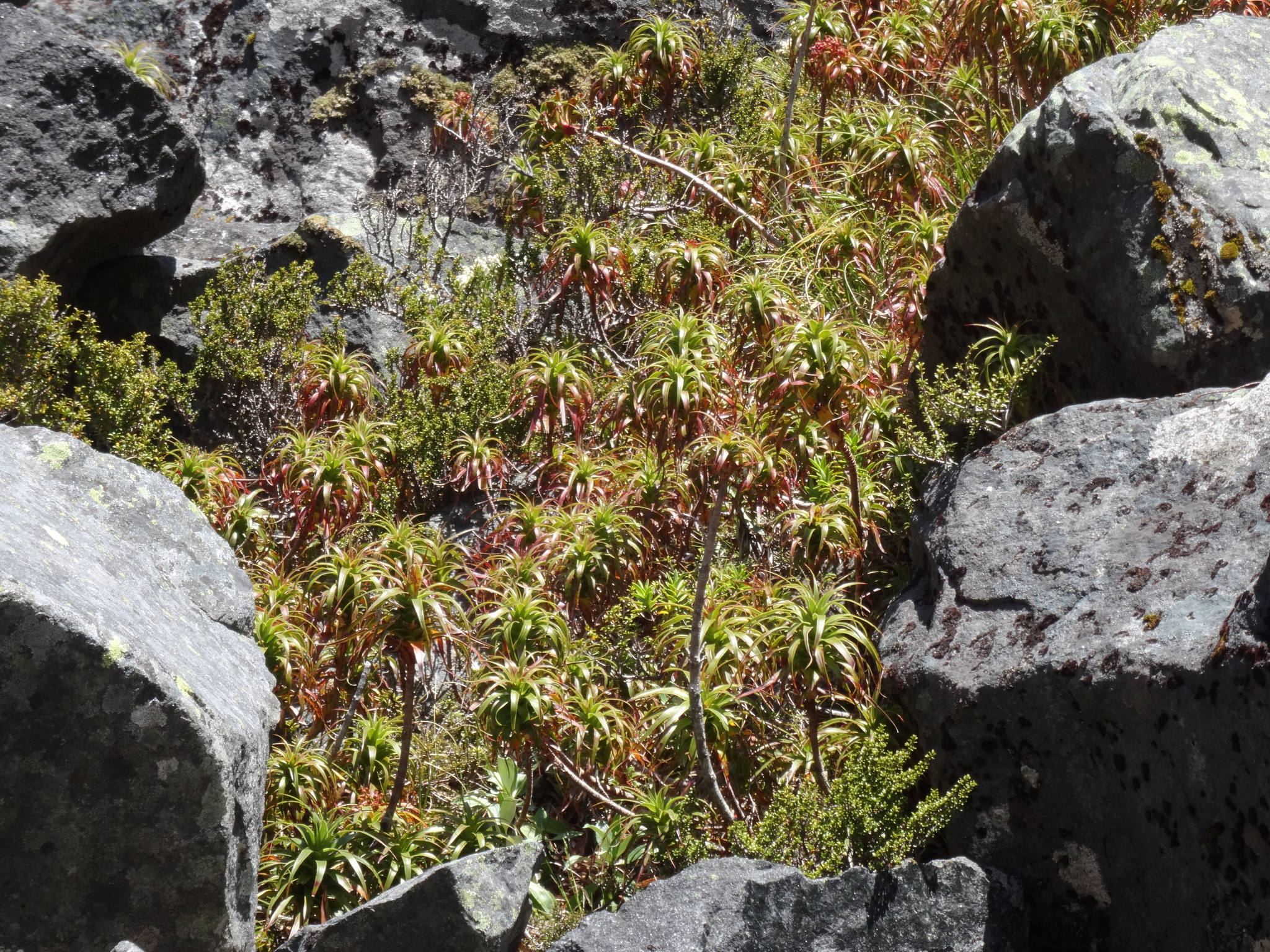
A large clump of D. menziesii

== Taxonomy ==
- - - - - - - - D. acerosum
              - D. densum
              - D. filifolium
              - D. kirkii
              - D. ophioliticum
              - D. patens
              - D. rosmarinifolium
              - D. trimorphum
            - D. arboreum
            - D. longifolium
            - D. muscoides
            - D. pronum
            - D. scoparium
        - - D. strictum
    - - - - D. fiordense
          - D. menziesii
        - - D. latifolium
          - D. townsonii
      - - D. traversii
  - other Dracophyllum spp.

Cladogram showing the phylogeny of selected species within the genus Dracophyllum, from research published in 2010.
Subgenus Oreothamnus
Subgenus Dracophyllum

Dracophyllum menziesii was first described by the British botanist Joseph Dalton Hooker in 1853, in the second volume of his The Botany of The Antarctic Voyage, titled "Flora Novae Zelandiae", (The Flora of New Zealand). He noted how it may have been the plant which Achille Richard had described from Georg Forster's drawing of a "D. longifolium," but it differs significantly from Forster's drawings. Since Hooker did not provide a holotype in his book, the type specimen is a lectotype, which the New Zealand botanist Walter Oliver designated in a later 1952 article. It was collected in the Dusky Sound in 1791 by Archibald Menzies.

=== Etymology ===
The etymology of Dracophyllum is from the genus' similarity to species in the genus Dracaena of the Canary Islands, and stems from the Ancient Greek for "dragon-leaf". The specific epithet menziesii is after the Scottish surgeon and naturalist Archibald Menzies. It is commonly called pineapple scrub.

=== Phylogeny ===
In 1928, Oliver published his first attempt to establish subgenera for Dracophyllum and placed D. menziesii in the subgenus Dracophyllum (then called Eudracophyllum) in the group of D. menziesii, together with D. fiordense and D. townsonii; this placement was unchanged in his 1952 supplement. What set it apart, he described, was its "low shrubby habit, crowded short and broad leaves, and rather large panicles borne on short branches below the leaves." In 2010, several botanists published an article on the genus Dracophyllum in Annals of the Missouri Botanical Garden. In it, they performed a cladistic analysis and produced a phylogenetic tree of the tribe Richeeae and other species using genetic sequencing established through the combination of rbcL and matK bases. They found that only Dracophyllum subg. Oreothamnus and the tribe Richeeae were monophyletic. The paraphyly of the genus Dracophyllum, as well as the polyphyly of the closely related genus Richea, they argued, suggested that a major taxonomic revision was required. The botanist Stephanus Venter revised the genus in 2021, merging the genus Richea into two subgenera named Dracophyllum subg. Cystanthe and D. subg. Dracophylloides. Because the 2010 study was based on plastid sequence data and did not attain some species with strong enough evidence, he instead based the subgenera on morphological characteristics. D. menziesii is kept in the subgenus Dracophyllum under his assessment.

Dracophyllum menziesii was found to be related most closely with D. fiordense, and is nested within a larger group (clade) that share a common ancestor; this includes D. traversii, D. townsonii and D. latifolium. Its placement can be summarised in the cladogram at right.
