= Mount Hercules =

Mountain in Ross Dependency, Antarctica

Mount Hercules (77°29′S 161°26′E) is a large, flat-topped, elevated feature between Mount Aeolus and Mount Jason in the Olympus Range of Victoria Land, Antarctica. It was named by the Victoria University of Wellington Antarctic Expedition (1958–59) for Hercules, a figure in Greek mythology.

Marsh Cirque is a cirque on the southern slopes of Mount Hercules. The cirque is 1 nautical mile (2 km) wide and in part occupied by a glacier. It was named by the Advisory Committee on Antarctic Names in 2004 after geologist Bruce D. Marsh, of the Department of Earth and Planetary Sciences, Johns Hopkins University, Baltimore, Maryland. Marsh investigated basement sill at McMurdo Dry Valleys sites in seven field seasons, 1995–2005, for the United States Antarctic Program.

Mount Hercules is separated from Mount Jason by the Nakai Snowfield. Harris Ledge lies to the north, and just west of it is Fritsen Valley.
