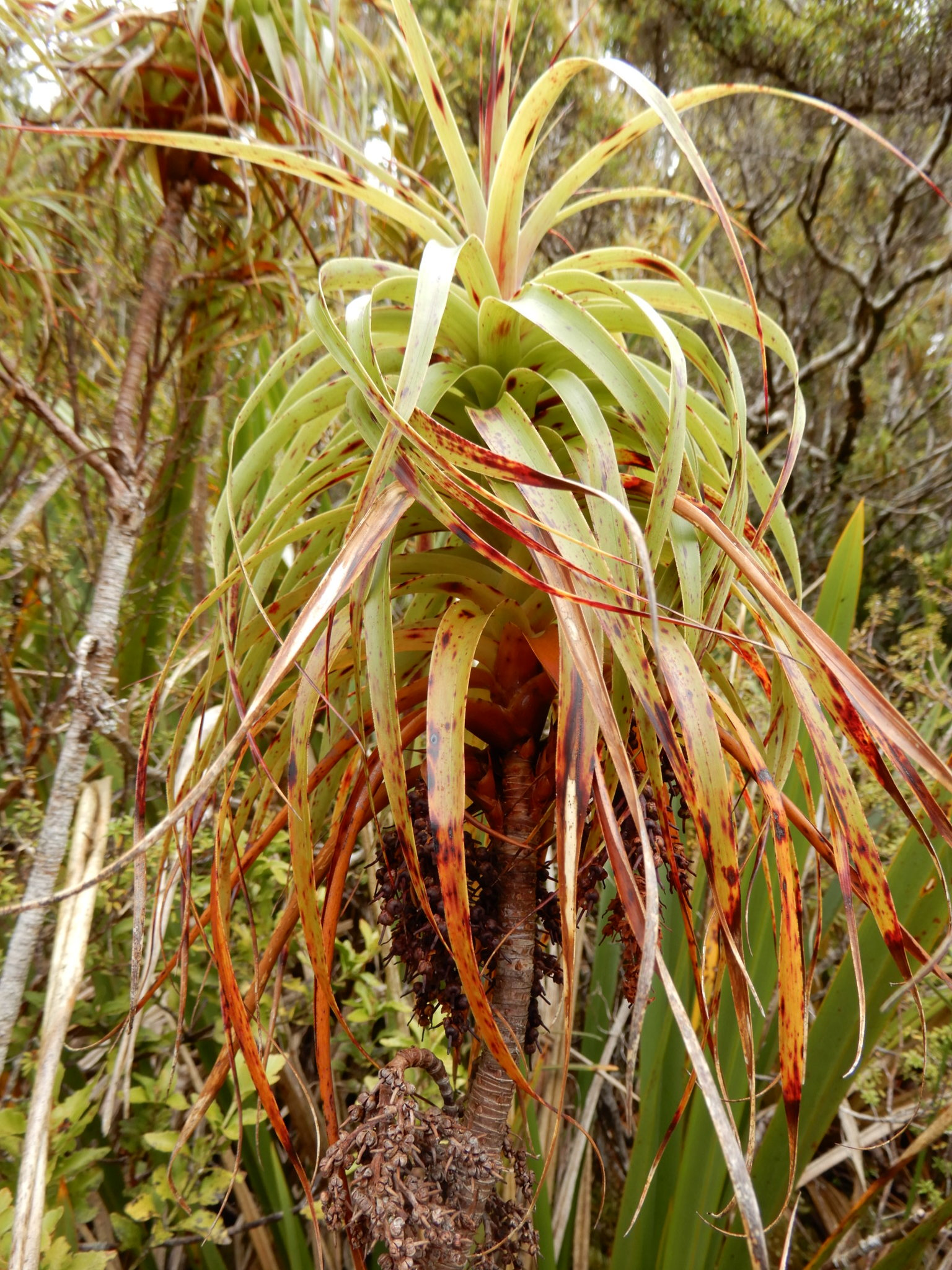

Scientific classification
- Kingdom: Plantae
- Clade: Tracheophytes
- Clade: Angiosperms
- Clade: Eudicots
- Clade: Asterids
- Order: Ericales
- Family: Ericaceae
- Genus: Dracophyllum
- Species: D. townsonii

Binomial name
- Dracophyllum townsonii Cheeseman

= Dracophyllum townsonii =

Species of flowering plant in the heath family

Dracophyllum townsonii is a species of shrub or small tree endemic to the north of New Zealand's South Island. It was first described by Thomas Cheeseman in 1906 and gets the specific epithet townsonii after the chemist and plant collector William Townson. In the heath family Ericaceae, it is found in coastal to lowland regions and reaches a height of 3–6 m (10–20 ft).

== Description ==
D. townsonnii is a slow-growing shrub or small tree, reaching up to 3–6 m (10–20 ft) tall. The branches form an open crown shaped like a candelabra. The foliage is dimorphic, with juvenile red-coloured leaves that are from 60 to 125 mm (2.4 to 4.9 in) long, and adult leaves that are shorter and glaucous, with striated, rough surfaces.

== Taxonomy ==
D. townsonnii was described by Thomas Cheeseman in the Manual of New Zealand Flora (1906). It is a dicotyledonous flowering plant in the heath family Ericaceae.

The specific epithet townsonii recognises botanist and botanical collector William L. Townson (1855-1926). The type specimen is held by the Royal Botanic Gardens, Kew.

== Distribution and habitat ==
The distribution of D. townsonnii is restricted to south-west Nelson and northern Westland. It is found in coastal to lowland regions, including cliffs and steep slopes. It occurs on substrates of tertiary sandstones, coal measures and conglomerates, but only rarely on limestone. D. townsonnii grows in shrublands, including areas where frequent fires have occurred.
