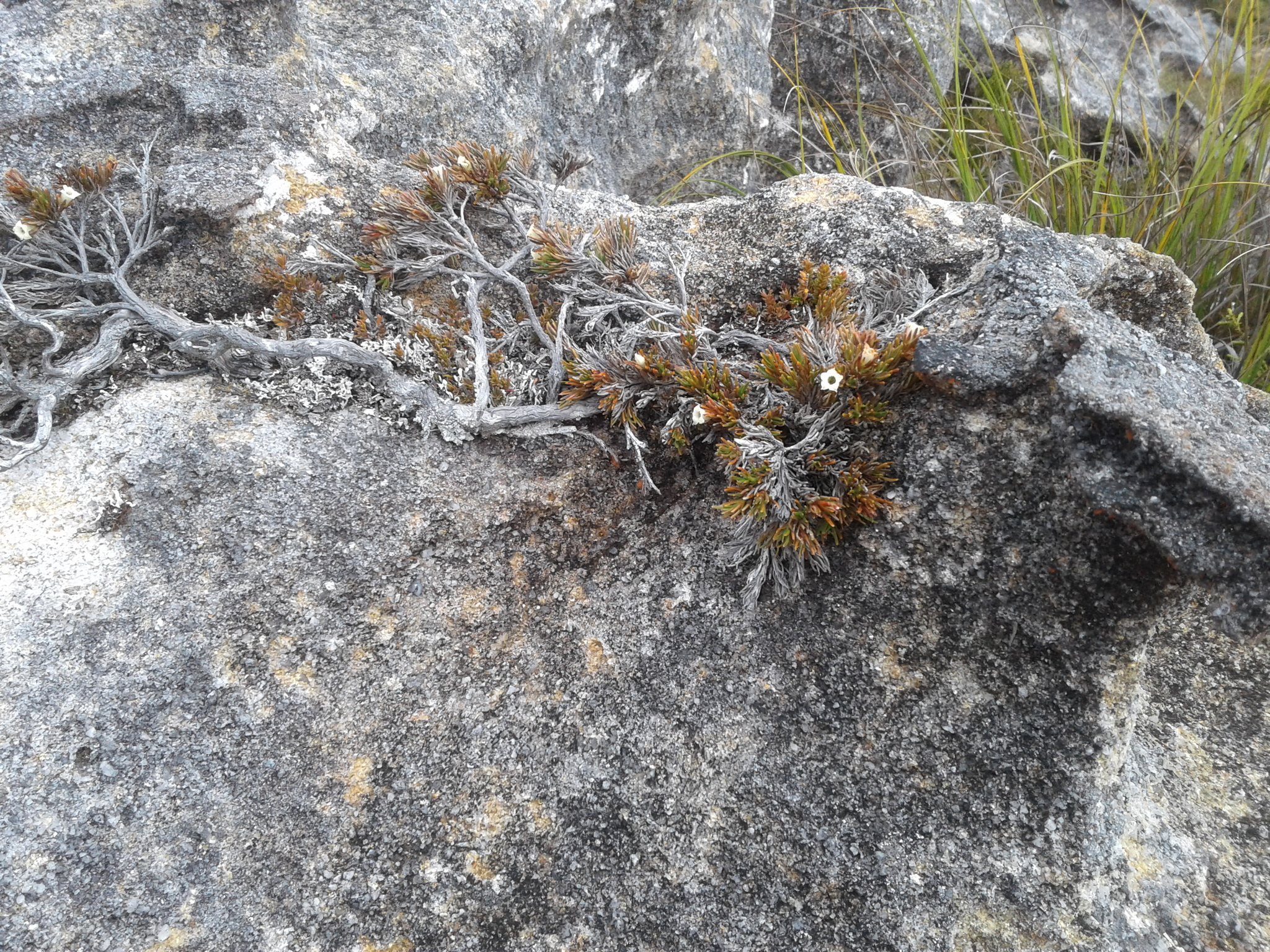

Conservation status
- Declining (NZ TCS)

Scientific classification
- Kingdom: Plantae
- Clade: Tracheophytes
- Clade: Angiosperms
- Clade: Eudicots
- Clade: Asterids
- Order: Ericales
- Family: Ericaceae
- Genus: Dracophyllum
- Species: D. densum

Binomial name
- Dracophyllum densum W.R.B.Oliv.
- Range

= Dracophyllum densum =

Species of flowering plant in the heath family

Dracophyllum densum is a species of shrub endemic to north-west Nelson in New Zealand's South Island. It was first described by Walter Oliver in 1952 and gets the specific epithet densum for its leaves growing densely. In the heath family Ericaceae, it inhabits mountain summits, plateaux, and ridge lines and reaches a height of 0.3–0.5 m (1–2 ft). A 2017 assessment using the New Zealand Threat Classification System classified it as "Declining", giving it an estimated population of more than 100,000.

== Description ==
Dracophyllum densum is a small shrub or subshrub, reaching heights of just 0.3–0.5 m (1–2 ft), which grows prostrate (along the ground) or occasionally decumbent (ends of branches reaching up).

== Taxonomy ==
Dracophyllum densum was first described by the New Zealand naturalist and ornithologist Walter Oliver (1883–1957) in a 1952 issue of the Transactions and Proceedings of the New Zealand Institute. (Note: This journal is now called the "Transactions and Proceedings of the Royal Society of New Zealand.") He noted, in what was a supplement to his 1928 publication, the first major monograph of the genus, that it was "a low, often prostrate, much branched shrub, with dense foliage." He designated the type specimen as one he had collected on Mount Rochfort in March 1949.

=== Etymology ===
Dracophyllum is from the genus's similarity to the species in the genus Dracaena from the Canary Islands and is from the Ancient Greek for "dragon-leaf". The specific epithet densum, is Latin for dense or compact, is for its leaves growing in dense clumps or groups.

=== Phylogeny ===
In Oliver's 1952 article, which supplemented his 1928 article in which he had originally set out the subgenera, he placed it in the subgenus Oreothamnus in the group of D. pearsoni, together with D. politum, and D. pearsoni. Its inclusion in the subgenus was due to its similarities with D. politum, differing only by its smaller leaves and leaf sheaths, and their olive green colour when dry. In 2010 several botanists published an article on the genus Dracophyllum in the Annals of the Missouri Botanical Garden. In it they performed a cladistic analysis and produced a phylogenetic tree of the tribe Richeeae and other species using genetic sequencing. They found that only the subgenus Oreothamnus and the tribe Richeeae were monophyletic. The paraphyly of the genus Dracophyllum, as well as the polyphyly of the closely related genus Richea, they argued, suggested that a major taxonomic revision was required. The New Zealand botanist Stephanus Venter revised the genus in 2021, merging the genus Richea into two subgenera, named D. Subg. Cystanthe and D. Subg. Dracophylloides, of Dracophyllum. Though he noted that because the 2010 study was based on plastid sequence data and did not attain some species with strong enough evidence, the subgenera are instead based on morphological characteristics. D. densum is kept in the subgenus Oreothamnus under his assessment.

D. densum is placed in the clade formed by several subgenus Oreothamnus species, with D. strictum (in the subgenus Dracophyllum) as sister to this clade. Its placement can be summarised in the following cladogram:

- - - - - - - - D. acerosum
              - D. densum
              - D. filifolium
              - D. kirkii
              - D. ophioliticum
              - D. patens
              - D. rosmarinifolium
              - D. trimorphum
            - D. arboreum
            - D. longifolium
            - D. muscoides
            - D. pronum
            - D. scoparium
        - - D. strictum
    - - - - D. fiordense
          - D. menziesii
        - - D. latifolium
          - D. townsonii
      - - D. traversii
  - other Dracophyllum spp.

Cladogram showing the phylogeny of selected species within the genus Dracophyllum, from research published in 2010.
Subgenus Oreothamnus
Subgenus Dracophyllum
