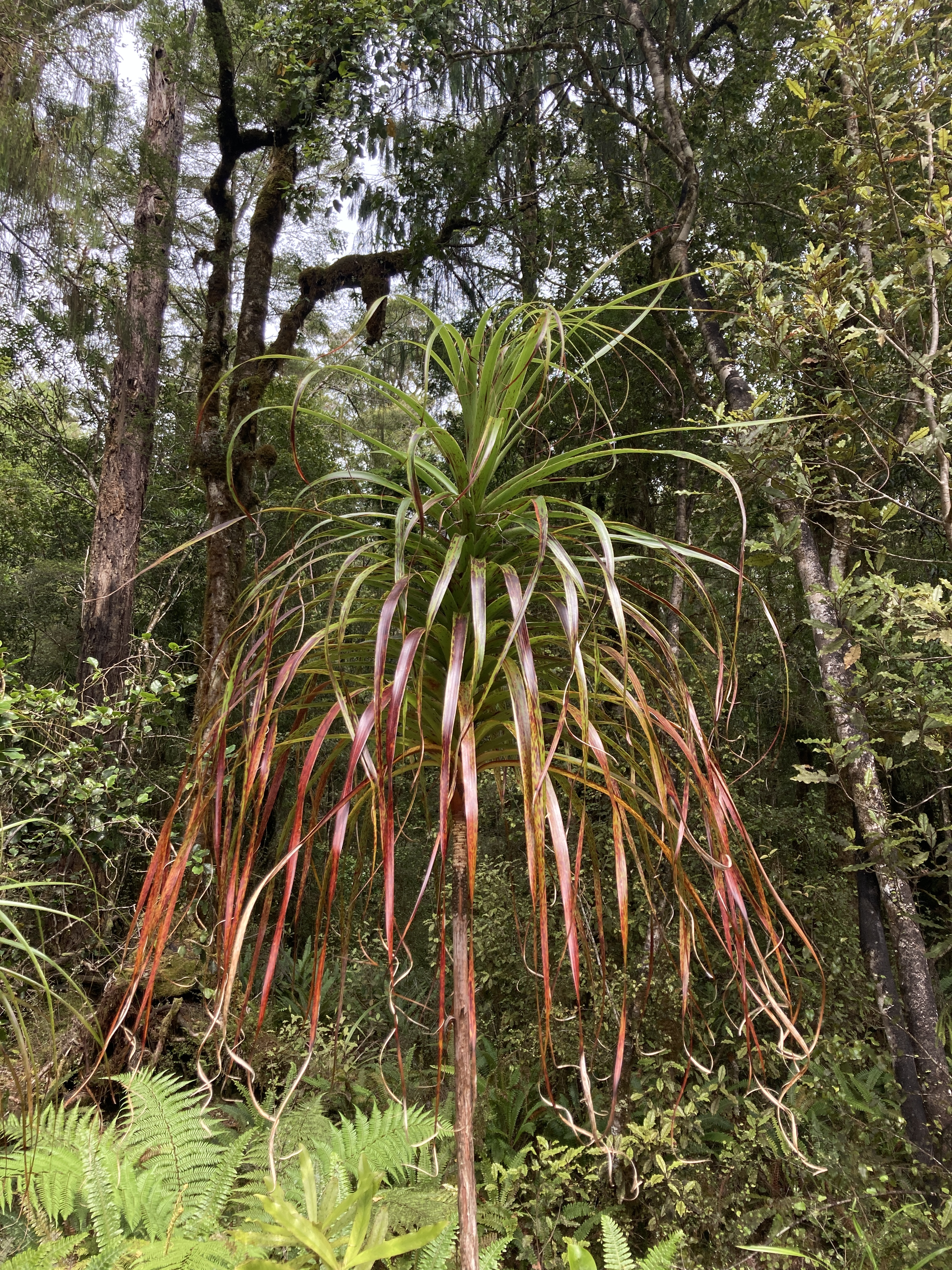

Scientific classification
- Kingdom: Plantae
- Clade: Tracheophytes
- Clade: Angiosperms
- Clade: Eudicots
- Clade: Asterids
- Order: Ericales
- Family: Ericaceae
- Genus: Dracophyllum
- Species: D. elegantissimum

Binomial name
- Dracophyllum elegantissimum S.Venter

= Dracophyllum elegantissimum =

Species of flowering plant

Dracophyllum elegantissimum, commonly known as grass tree or slender dragon tree, is a flowering plant in the family Ericaceae. Endemic to New Zealand, it is found in the north of the South Island, in north-west Nelson.

== Description ==
Dracophyllum elegantissimum is a single-stemmed tree which grows to a height of 5–14 m (16–46 ft). Its branches have flaky light brown bark with leaves concentrated in tufts similar to that of plants in the family Bromeliaceae, together forming a candelabra-shaped crown. The light green 33–100 by 1–3.2 cm (12.99–39.37 by 0.39–1.26 in) leaves are leathery and sheathed in 22–58 by 13–43 mm (0.87–2.28 by 0.51–1.69 in) light brown sheathes. Glabrous and very finely toothed, such that there are 12–24 teeth every 10mm, the leaves are also curled. It flowers from December until February, producing 600–1000 or more flowers on a pyramid-shaped 19–32 cm (7.5–12.6 in) long inflorescence. Fruiting occurs from February to March, yielding yellow-brown 0.7–0.8 millimetres (0.028–0.031 in) long filiform seeds.

D. elegantissimum is very similar to D. traversii, but differs most clearly from the latter by its long, thin leaves which are curled at the ends. It also has smaller nectary scales and ovaries as well as longer inflorescence bracts, however. It is also allied to D. latifolium, but can be identified by its longer inflorescence bracts, corolla lobes which are shorter than the corolla tubes, as well as smaller nectary scales and ovaries.

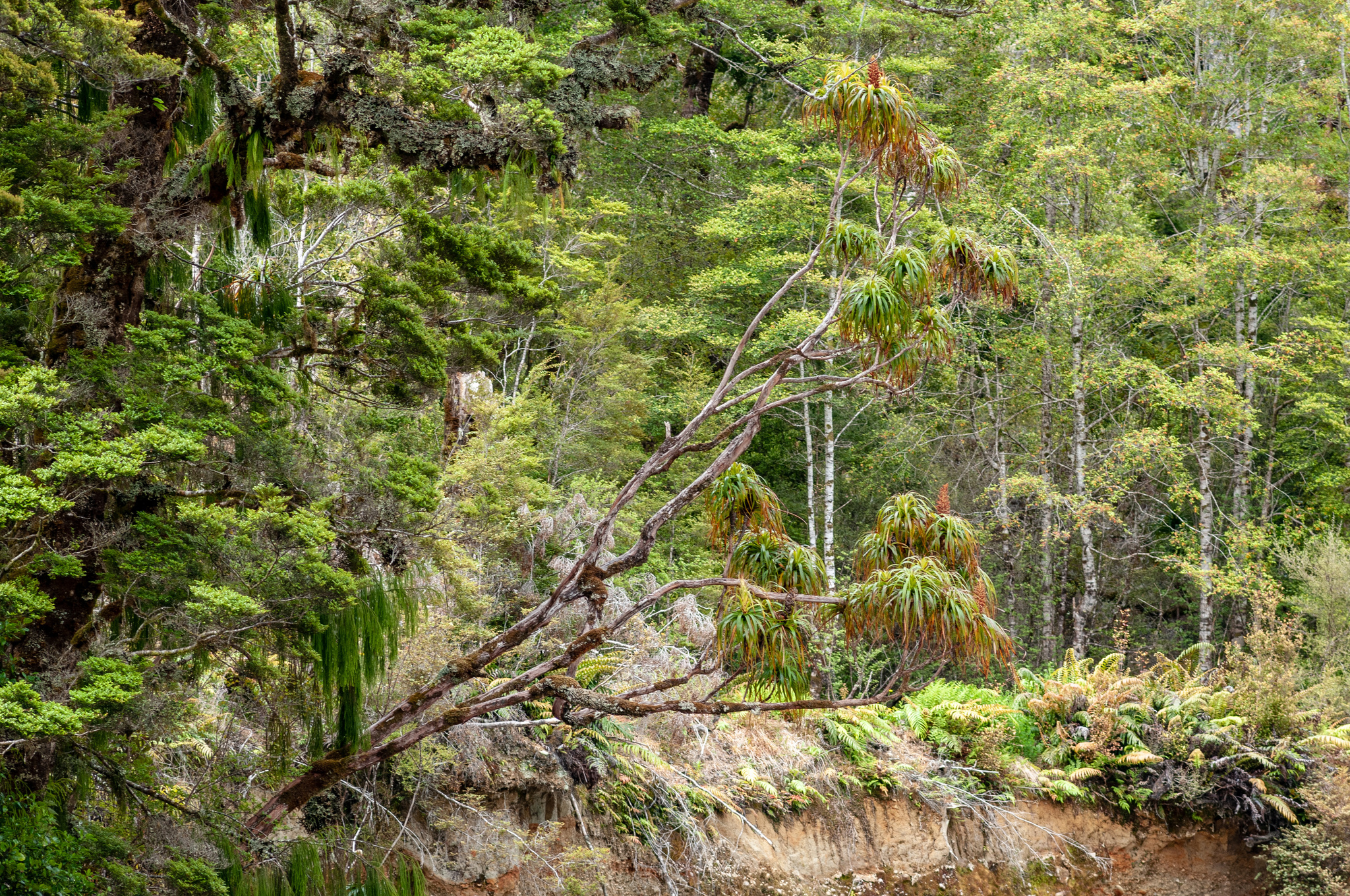
The canopy

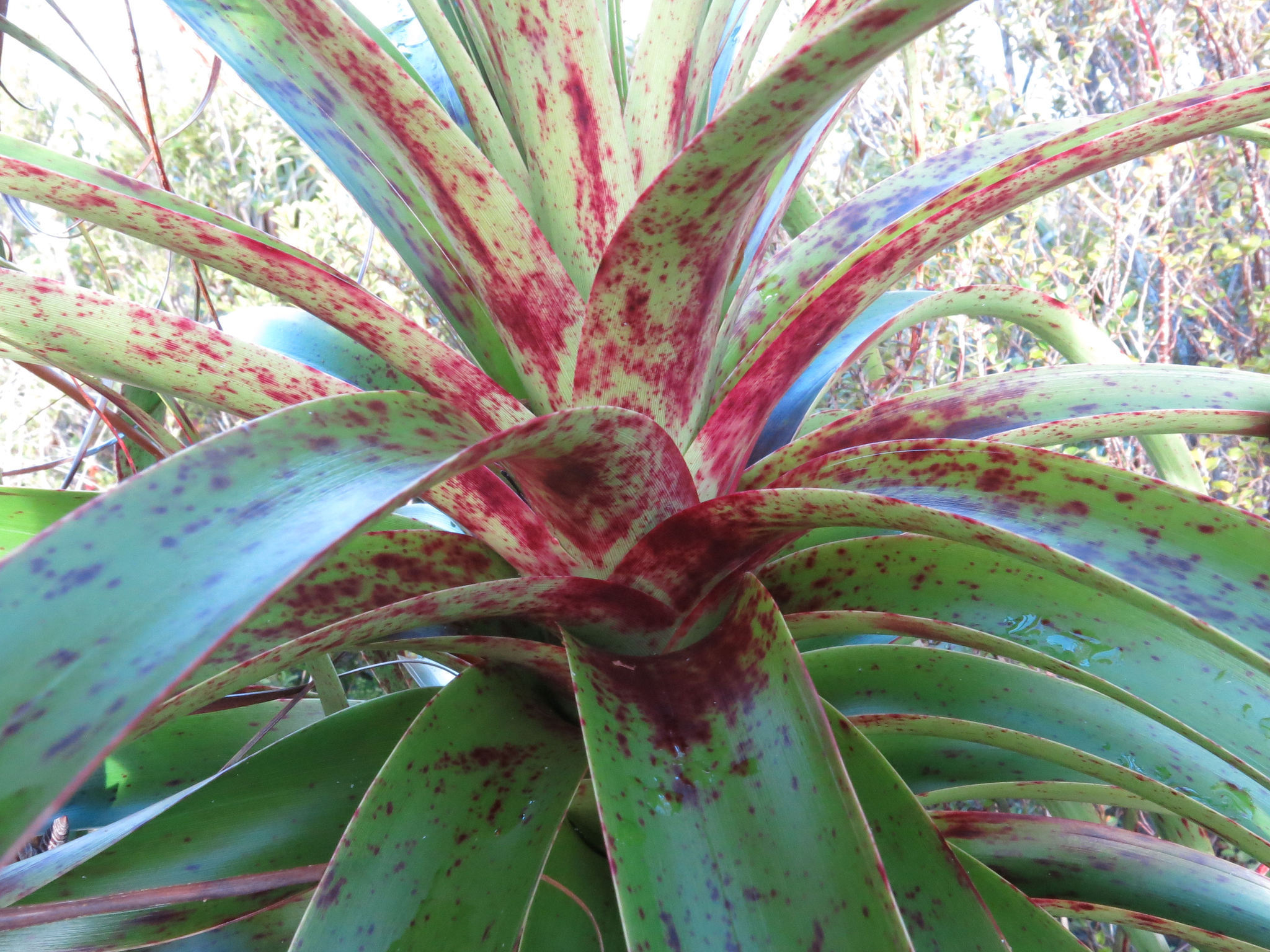
Leaves

== Distribution and habitat ==
D. elegantissimum is endemic to New Zealand and is found only in north-west Nelson in lowland to upper montane forests. They are almost always found on 5–45˚ south-west to north-west facing slopes.

== Taxonomy ==
=== Discovery and naming ===
It was first described in 2004 by Stephanus Venter in the New Zealand Journal of Botany. It was first collected, however, 36 years earlier in 1968 by A. P. Druce who identified it as Dracophyllum traversii. The specimen was collected from Moa Park in Abel Tasman National Park and its differences were discovered later, during a separate study on D. traversii.

=== Etymology ===
Dracophyllum means dragon leaf which comes from its similarity to the dragon tree. It gets the specific epithet elegantissimum, Latin for elegant, due to the graceful way in which the canopy forms and its long, narrow leaves.
