= Dracophyllum macranthum =

Scientific classification
- Kingdom: Plantae
- Clade: Tracheophytes
- Clade: Angiosperms
- Clade: Eudicots
- Clade: Asterids
- Order: Ericales
- Family: Ericaceae
- Genus: Dracophyllum
- Species: D. macranthum

Binomial name
- Dracophyllum macranthum E.A.Br. & N.Streiber

Species of flowering plant

Dracophyllum macranthum is a small shrub in the family Ericaceae. Plants grow to 0.6–2.0 metres tall, and produce rose-to-pink coloured flowers between August and October. It is endemic to the northern coast of New South Wales, Australia.

== Etymology ==
The specific epithet, macranthum, is derived from two Greek words: μακρός (macros, meaning large) and ἄνθος (anthos, meaning flower).

== Distribution and habitat ==
Dracophyllum macranthum has a restricted range in the forests north of Taree, New South Wales. The species is known to be found in the Lansdowne and Comboyne State Forests, and in Coorabakh National Park.

Plants are typically found on rocky outcrops, such as those found in stream gullies, or on roadside cuttings.

== Status and conservation ==
Estimates of the population of Dracophyllum macranthum have ranged widely. One study from 2007 estimated the population to be around 2,500–5,000, while a 2018 study estimated it to be at least 100,000.

Threats to Dracophyllum macranthum include invasive weeds such as Lantana camara and Ageratina riparia, as well as road and track maintenance. The pathogen Phytophthora cinnamomi is also thought to be a potential threat, though whether the plant is susceptible is yet to be tested.

In 2008, the NSW Scientific Committee listed Dracophyllum macranthum as a 'Vulnerable Species' under the Threatened Species Conservation Act 1995, due to its restricted range and small population. The species continues to be listed as such under the later Biodiversity Conservation Act 2016, which repealed the former Act. However, subsequent research has suggested that the population may be large enough to warrant being de-listed from this category.
