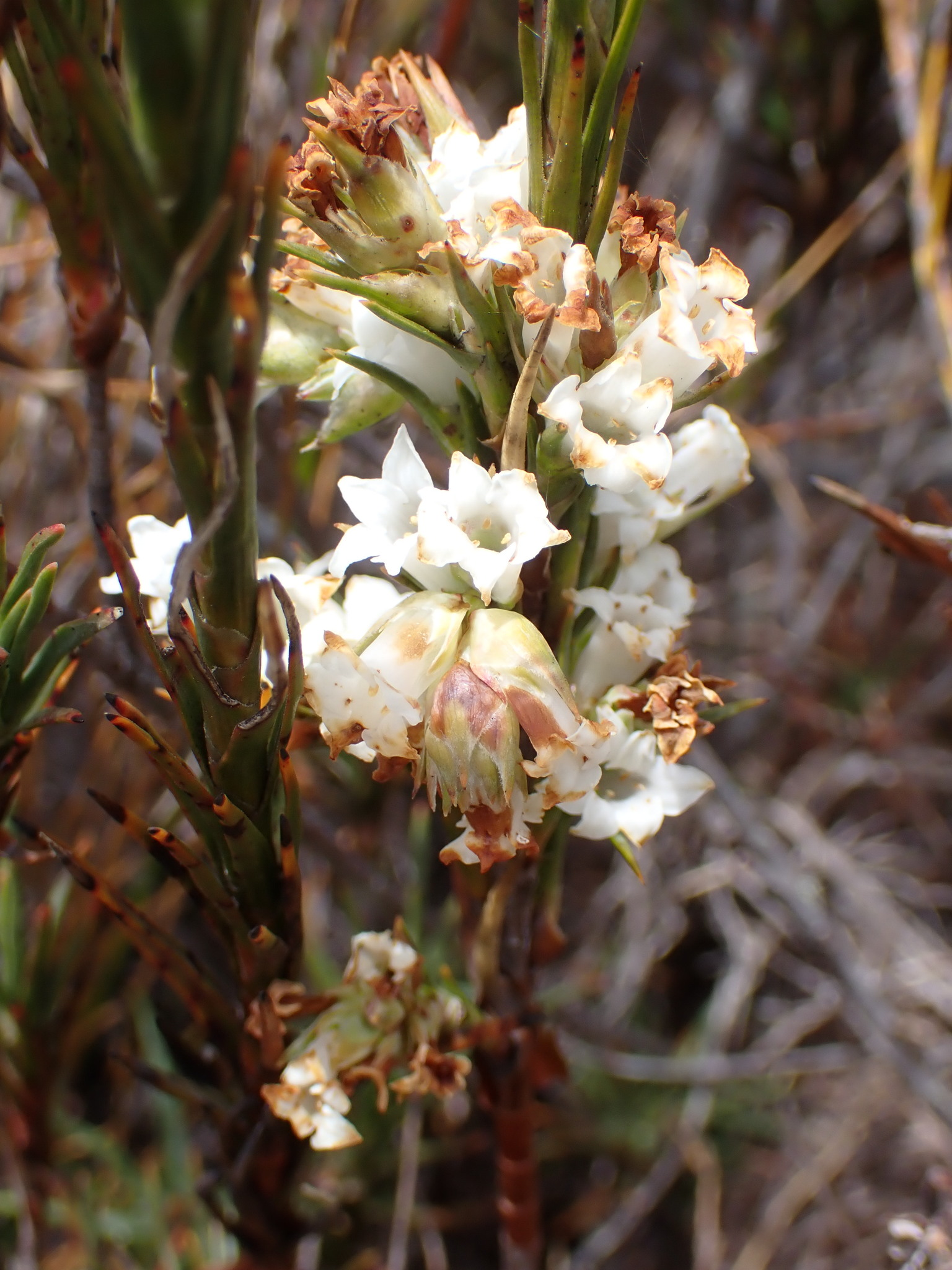

Conservation status
- Not Threatened (NZ TCS)

Scientific classification
- Kingdom: Plantae
- Clade: Tracheophytes
- Clade: Angiosperms
- Clade: Eudicots
- Clade: Asterids
- Order: Ericales
- Family: Ericaceae
- Genus: Dracophyllum
- Species: D. oliveri

Binomial name
- Dracophyllum oliveri Du Rietz

= Dracophyllum oliveri =

Species of flowering plant in the heath family

Dracophyllum oliveri is a species of shrub or small tree endemic to the South Island of New Zealand. It was first described by Gustaf Einar Du Rietz in 1920 and gets the specific epithet oliveri after Walter Oliver. In the heath family Ericaceae, it inhabits mountain slopes, gullies, and plateaus and reaches heights of between 1 and 4 m (3 ft 3 in and 13 ft 1 in). A 2017 assessment using the New Zealand Threat Classification System classified it as “Not Threatened", giving it an estimated population of 100,000.
