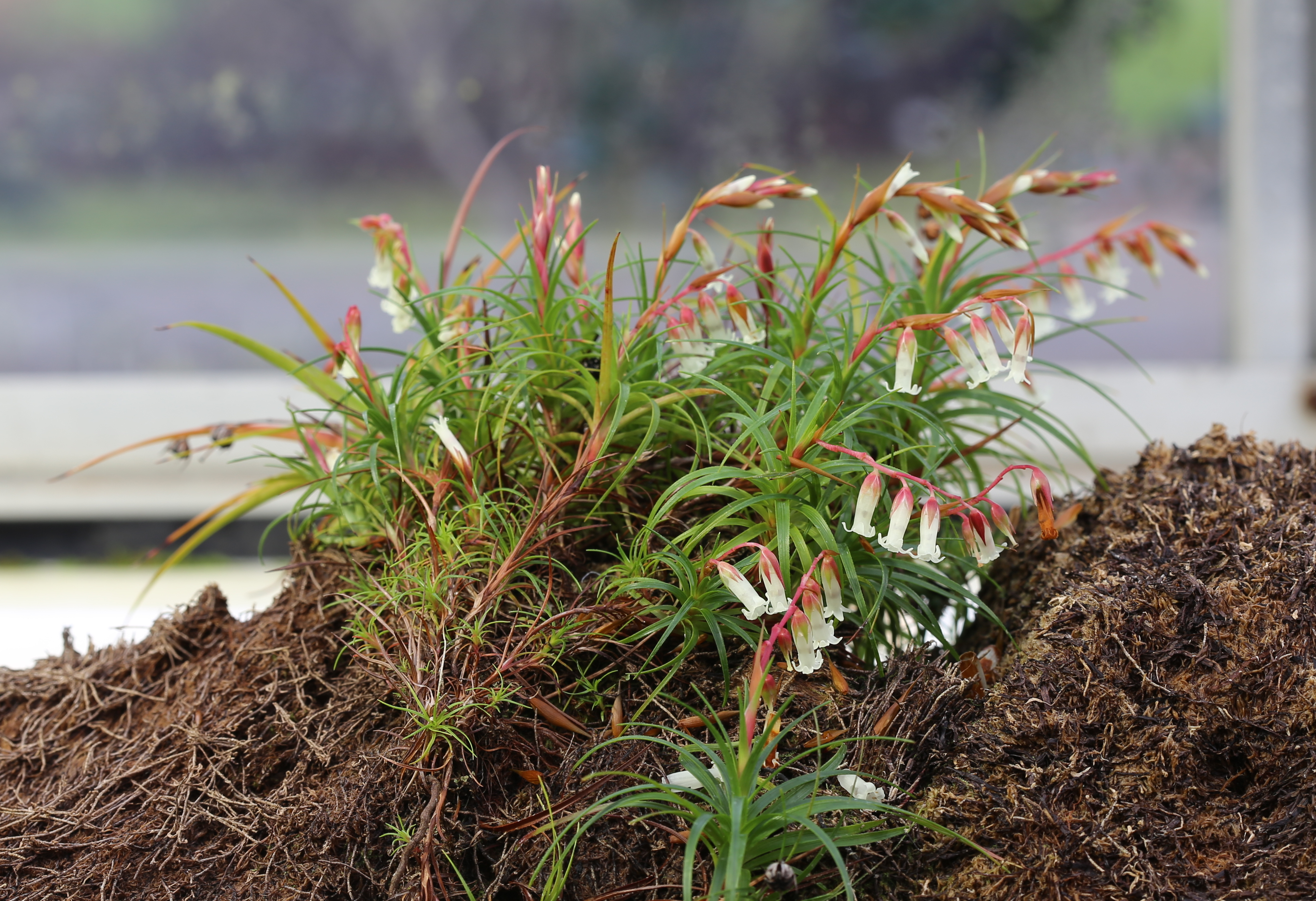

Scientific classification
- Kingdom: Plantae
- Clade: Tracheophytes
- Clade: Angiosperms
- Clade: Eudicots
- Clade: Asterids
- Order: Ericales
- Family: Ericaceae
- Genus: Dracophyllum
- Species: D. secundum

Binomial name
- Dracophyllum secundum R.Br.

Synonyms
- Epacris secunda (R.Br.) Poir.; Dracophyllum secundum f. rubrorosea Domin; Prionotes secunda (R.Br.) Spreng.

= Dracophyllum secundum =

Species of flowering plant

Dracophyllum secundum is a prostrate to semi-erect shrub found in eastern Australia. It occurs from as far south as Pigeon House Mountain north to Kendall, New South Wales on the mid north coast. A common plant in the Blue Mountains near Sydney. Found as far west as Blackheath. It is often noticed by bushwalkers for the attractive flowers and arching foliage.

== Habitat ==
The habitat is moist rocky areas and wet cliff faces, usually on sandstone. Sites are nutrient poor with permanent moisture. The range of altitude is from sea level to 1,100 metres (3,600 ft) above sea level, with an average annual rainfall between 900 millimetres (35 in) and 1,600 millimetres (63 in).

== Description ==
The shrub is around 60 centimetres (24 in) tall with narrow crowded leaves with pointed tips. Leaves are 12 centimetres (4.7 in) long by 1 centimetre (0.39 in) wide, smooth edged or slightly toothed. Flowering occurs mainly from July to October. Flowers are pink and white. Bell shaped flowers are 6–8 millimetres (0.24–0.31 in) long, appearing on a long raceme. The fruit is a capsule, around 5 millimetres (0.20 in) in diameter. Seeds are dispersed by wind, water and gravity.

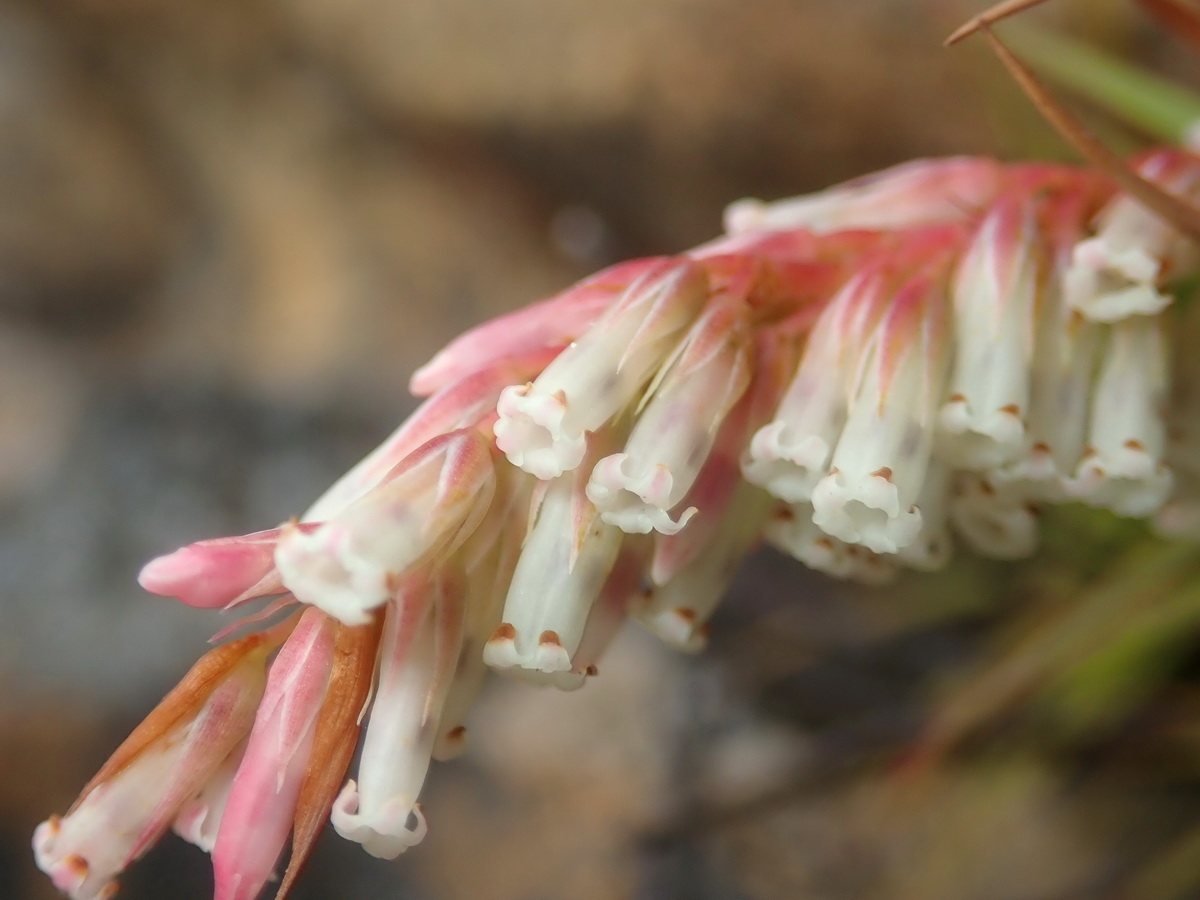
The flowers

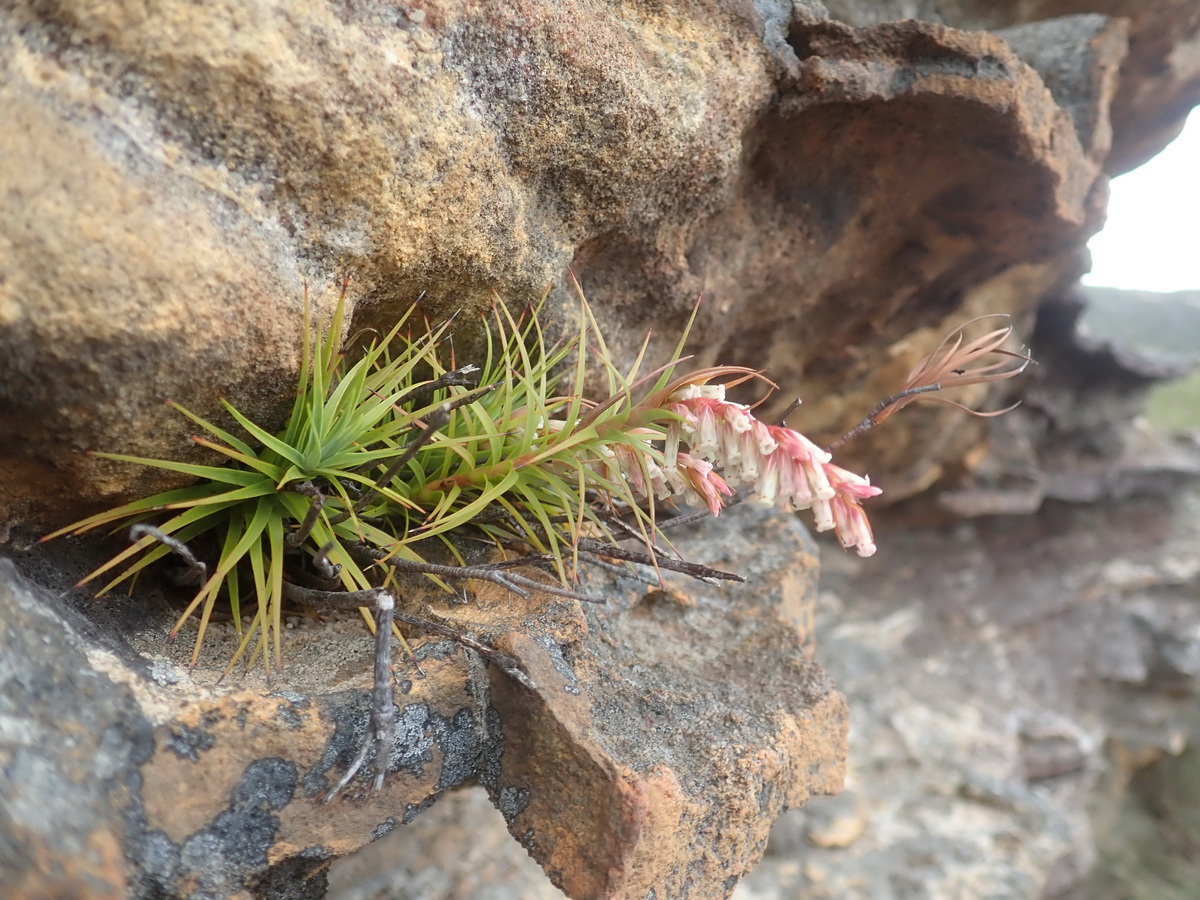
Growth habit

== Taxonomy ==
This plant first appeared in scientific literature in the Prodromus Florae Novae Hollandiae in the year 1810, authored by Robert Brown.

== Etymology ==
The specific epithet secundum means "arranged on one side only".
