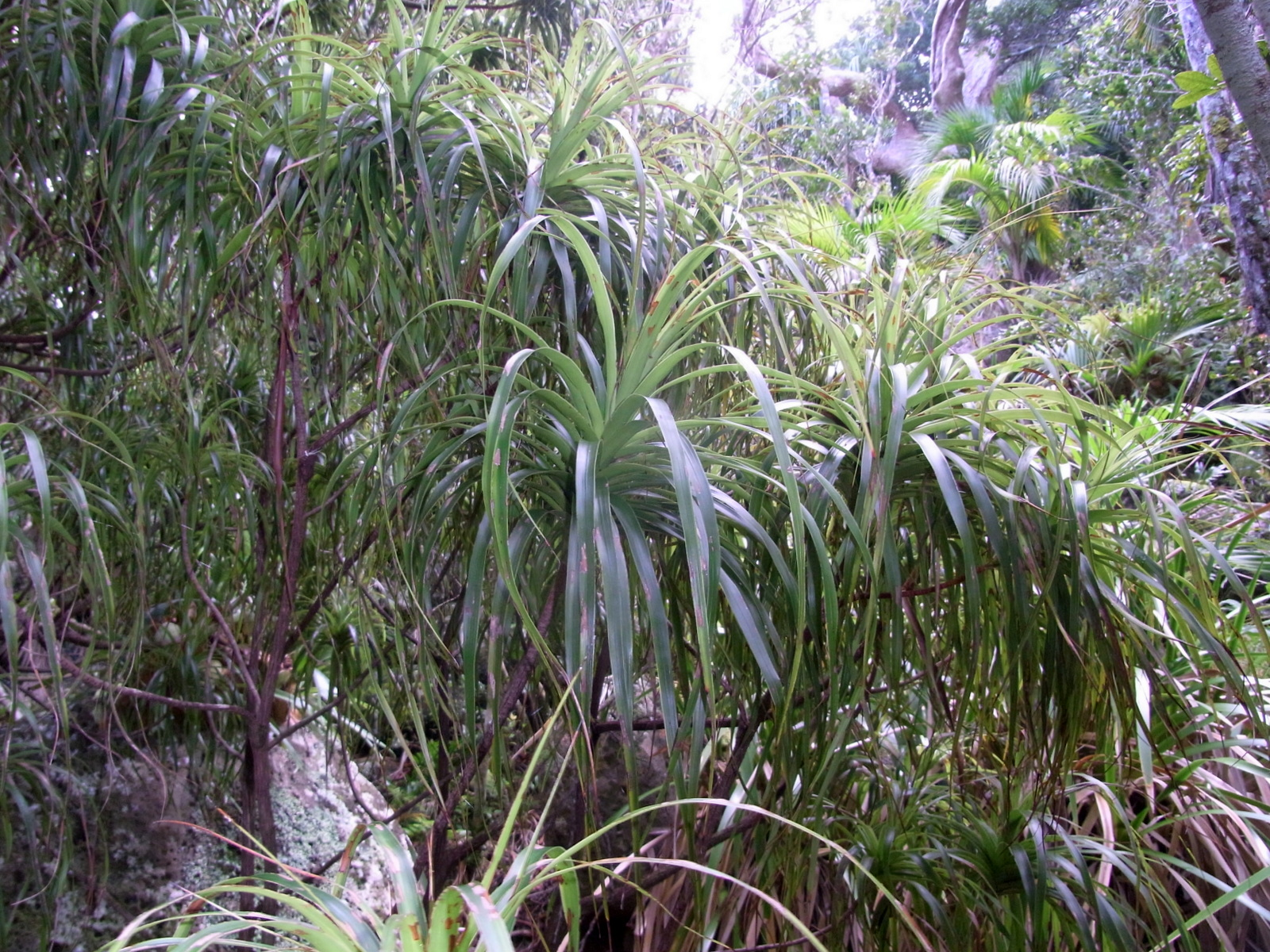

Scientific classification
- Kingdom: Plantae
- Clade: Tracheophytes
- Clade: Angiosperms
- Clade: Eudicots
- Clade: Asterids
- Order: Ericales
- Family: Ericaceae
- Genus: Dracophyllum
- Species: D. fitzgeraldii

Binomial name
- Dracophyllum fitzgeraldii C.Moore & F.Muell. (1869)

= Dracophyllum fitzgeraldii =

Species of flowering plant

Dracophyllum fitzgeraldii, commonly known as the Fitzgeraldii tree or Fitzgerald tree, is a flowering plant in the family Ericaceae. It is endemic to Lord Howe Island, though its closest relatives are species native to northern Queensland and to New Caledonia.

== Description ==
It is a much-branched, spreading tree growing to 13 metres (43 ft) in height. Its long, narrow leaves, clumped and closely overlapping at the branch ends, are 15–30 centimetres (5.9–11.8 in) long, and 1–1.5 centimetres (0.39–0.59 in) wide at the base. The densely paniculate, 10–20 centimetres (3.9–7.9 in) long, inflorescences bear masses of small white flowers. The spheroidal, brown capsule is 2–3 millimetres (0.079–0.118 in) long. The main flowering season is in January.

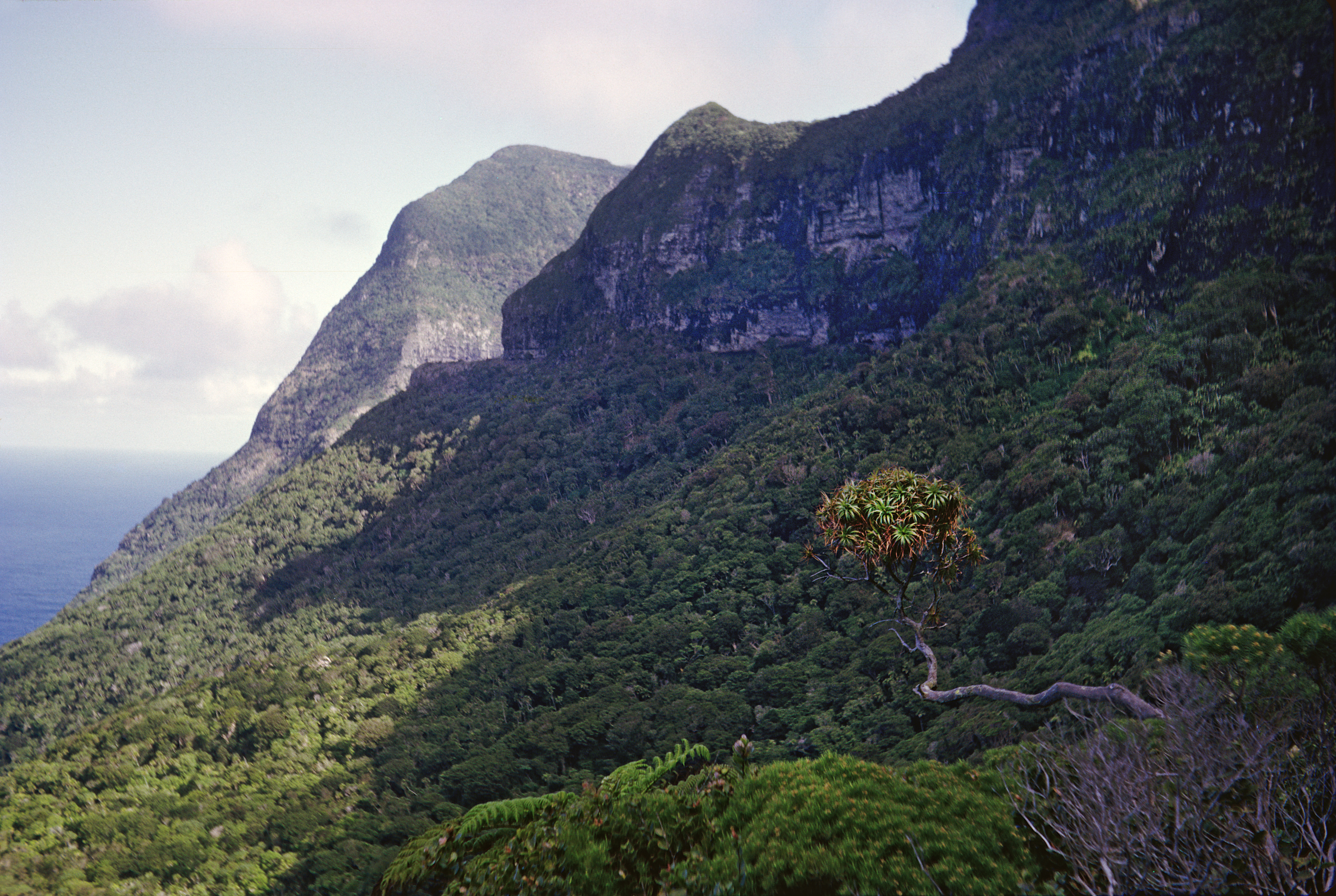
D. fitzgeraldii, against the east face of Mount Lidgbird

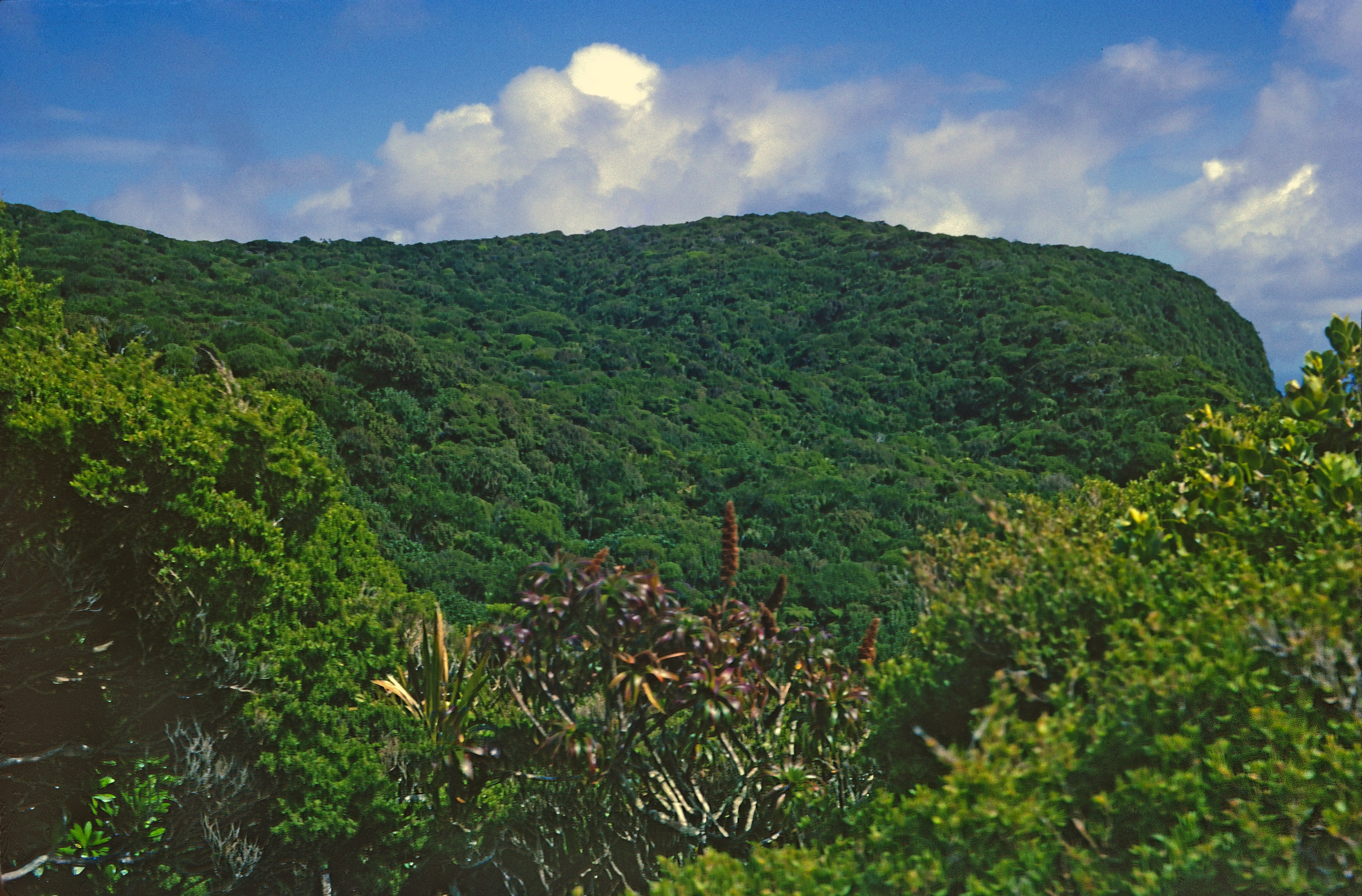
D. fitzgeraldii (in foreground) on the Gower Plateau, 1965

== Distribution and habitat ==
The tree is endemic to Australia's subtropical Lord Howe Island in the Tasman Sea, where it is found in mountain forests from the Goat House and Erskine Valley to the tops of Mounts Erskine and Gower.

== Etymology ==
The specific epithet fitzgeraldii honours Robert Fitzgerald, an Irish–Australian surveyor and botanist who collected plants on Lord Howe Island in 1869.
