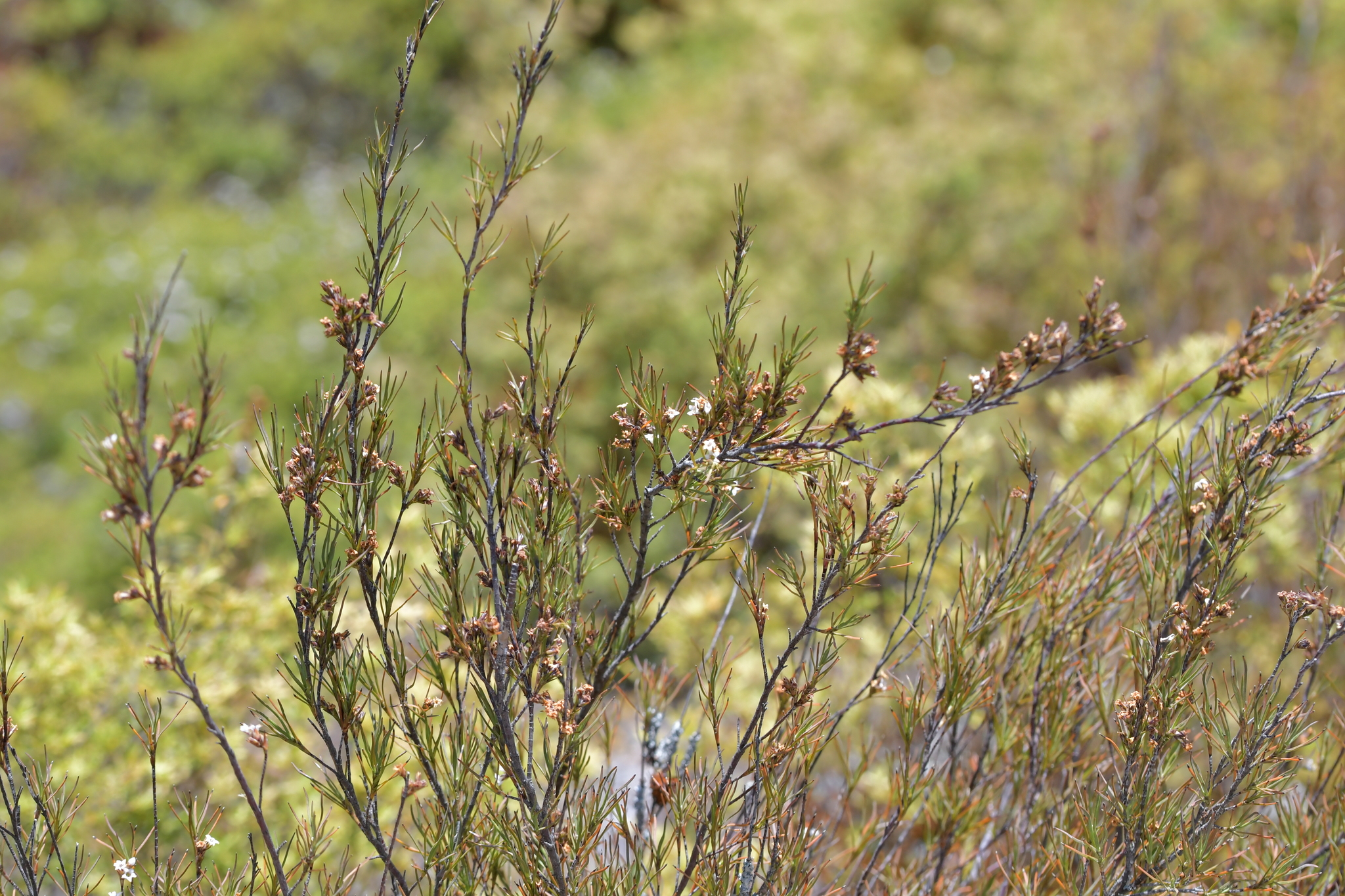

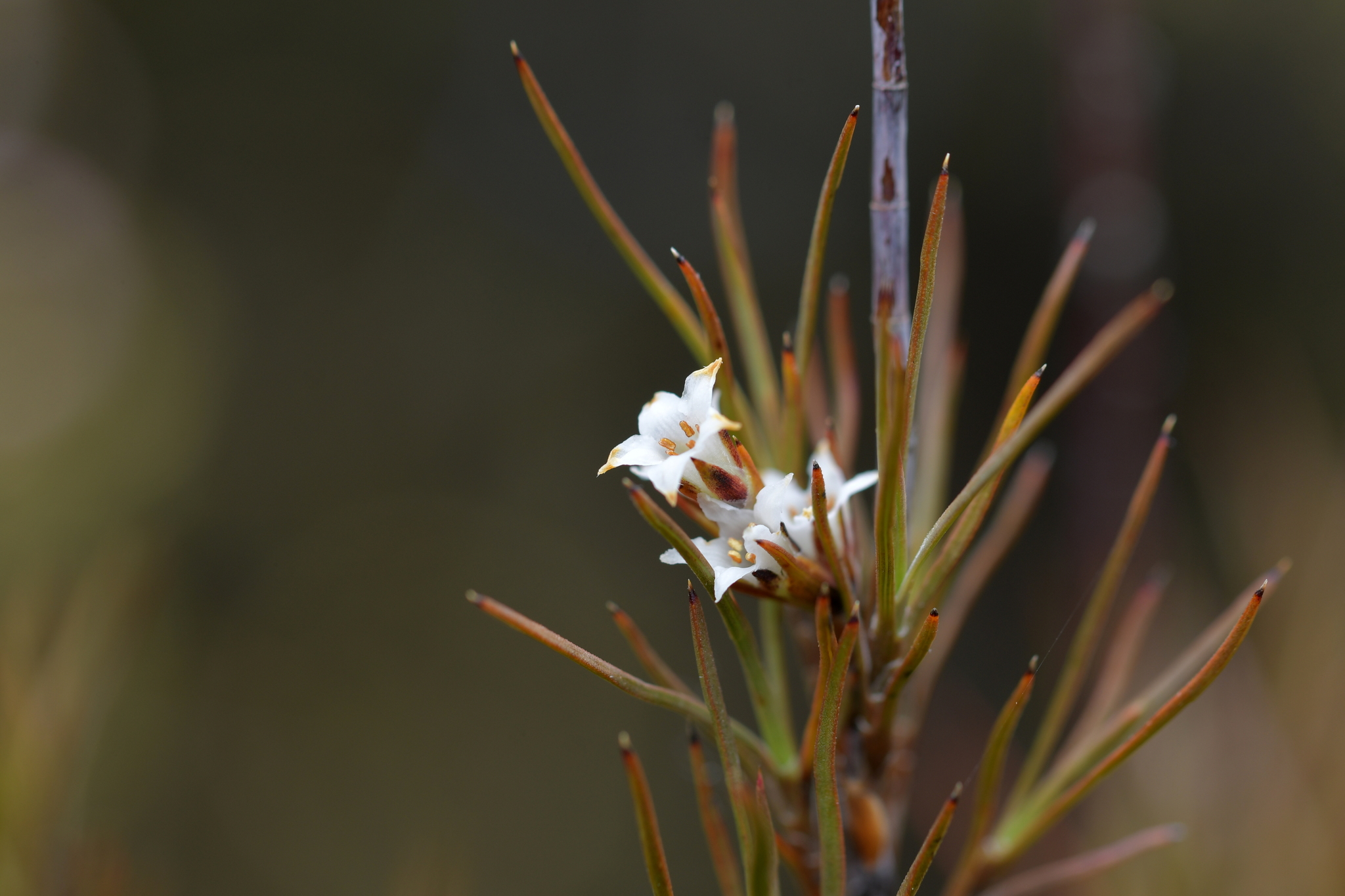
- Flower closeup

Conservation status
- Not Threatened (NZ TCS)

Scientific classification
- Kingdom: Plantae
- Clade: Tracheophytes
- Clade: Angiosperms
- Clade: Eudicots
- Clade: Asterids
- Order: Ericales
- Family: Ericaceae
- Genus: Dracophyllum
- Species: D. subulatum

Binomial name
- Dracophyllum subulatum Hook.f., 1867

Synonyms
- Dracophyllum angustifolium (Colenso)

= Dracophyllum subulatum =

Monoao

Species of tree or shrub

Dracophyllum subulatum, commonly known as monoao, is a species of tree or shrub in the heath family Ericaceae. It is endemic to the central North Island of New Zealand.

It was first described by the British botanist Joseph Dalton Hooker in 1844, and in 1867 was placed by the New Zealand botanist William Colenso in the subgenus Dracophyllum.

== Description ==
It reaches a height of 0.3–2.0 m (0.98–6.56 ft) and has waved leaves, which look like narrow grass, with many thin stalks.

In juvenile form, D. subulatum's leaves spirally arrange along the soft grey, reddish or purplish brown in juvenile, branches and they spread. The colour of mature leaves is olive to dark green. They erect for spreading. Flowering time is from November to March, it produces green or white flowers. Its inflorescence (flower spike) is tiny and has not many flowers.

It was first described by the British botanist Joseph Dalton Hooker in 1844, and in 1867 was placed by the New Zealand botanist William Colenso in the subgenus Dracophyllum.

== Range ==
It is endemic to the North Island of New Zealand, from Rotorua to Taihape, living in low-lying areas between volcanoes, shrubland, and tussock grassland in altitudes from 100 to 1,200m.

== Ecology ==
They are facilitators, protecting native species from frosts, therefore encouraging plant biodiversity.
