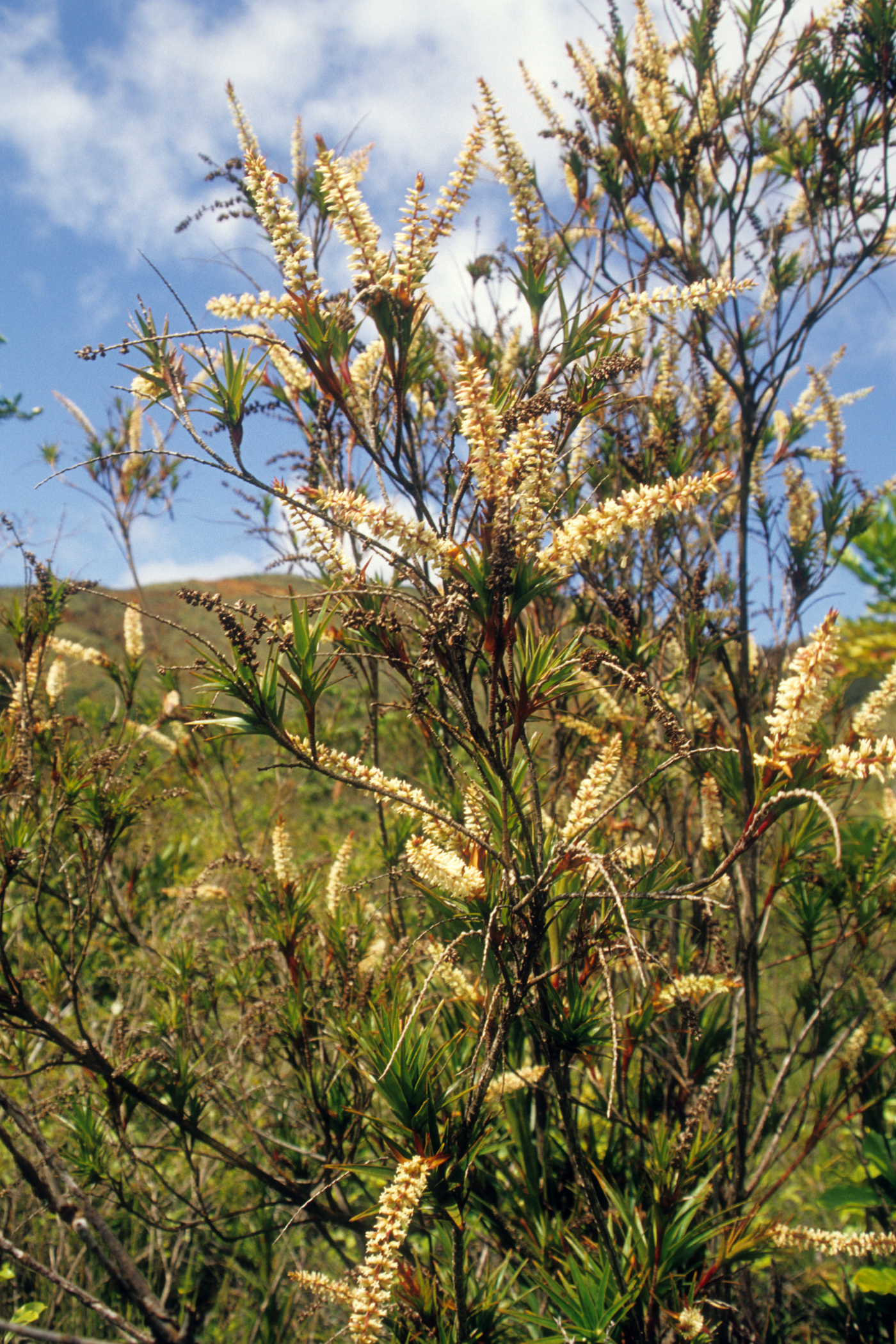

Scientific classification
- Kingdom: Plantae
- Clade: Embryophytes
- Clade: Tracheophytes
- Clade: Angiosperms
- Clade: Eudicots
- Clade: Asterids
- Order: Ericales
- Family: Ericaceae
- Genus: Dracophyllum
- Species: D. ramosum

Binomial name
- Dracophyllum ramosum Pancher ex Brongn. & Gris.

Synonyms
- Dracophyllum amabile Brongn. & Gris, Bull.; Dracophyllum vieillardii Lenorm. ex Guillaumin

= Dracophyllum ramosum =

Species of flowering plant in the heath family

Dracophyllum ramosum is a species of shrub or small tree in the family Ericaceae and is endemic to New Caledonia. It was first described by Adolphe-Théodore Brongniart and Jean Antoine Arthur Gris in 1864 and gets the specific epithet ramosum for the fact that many of its branches grow from the same place. It inhabits the summits and slopes of mountains, alongside streams, and on plateaux; it reaches a height of 0.5–5 m (1 ft 8 in – 16 ft 5 in).
