= Dracophyllum ouaiemense =

Scientific classification
- Kingdom: Plantae
- Clade: Embryophytes
- Clade: Tracheophytes
- Clade: Angiosperms
- Clade: Eudicots
- Clade: Asterids
- Order: Ericales
- Family: Ericaceae
- Genus: Dracophyllum
- Species: D. ouaiemense

Binomial name
- Dracophyllum ouaiemense Virot

Species of flowering plant in the heath family

Dracophyllum ouaiemense is a species of shrub in the family Ericaceae and is endemic to New Caledonia. It was first described by Robert Virot in 1975 and gets the specific epithet ouaiemense after the region in which it grows: Roche Ouaième. It inhabits the tops of mountains and more gentle slopes and reaches a height of 50 cm (20 in).
