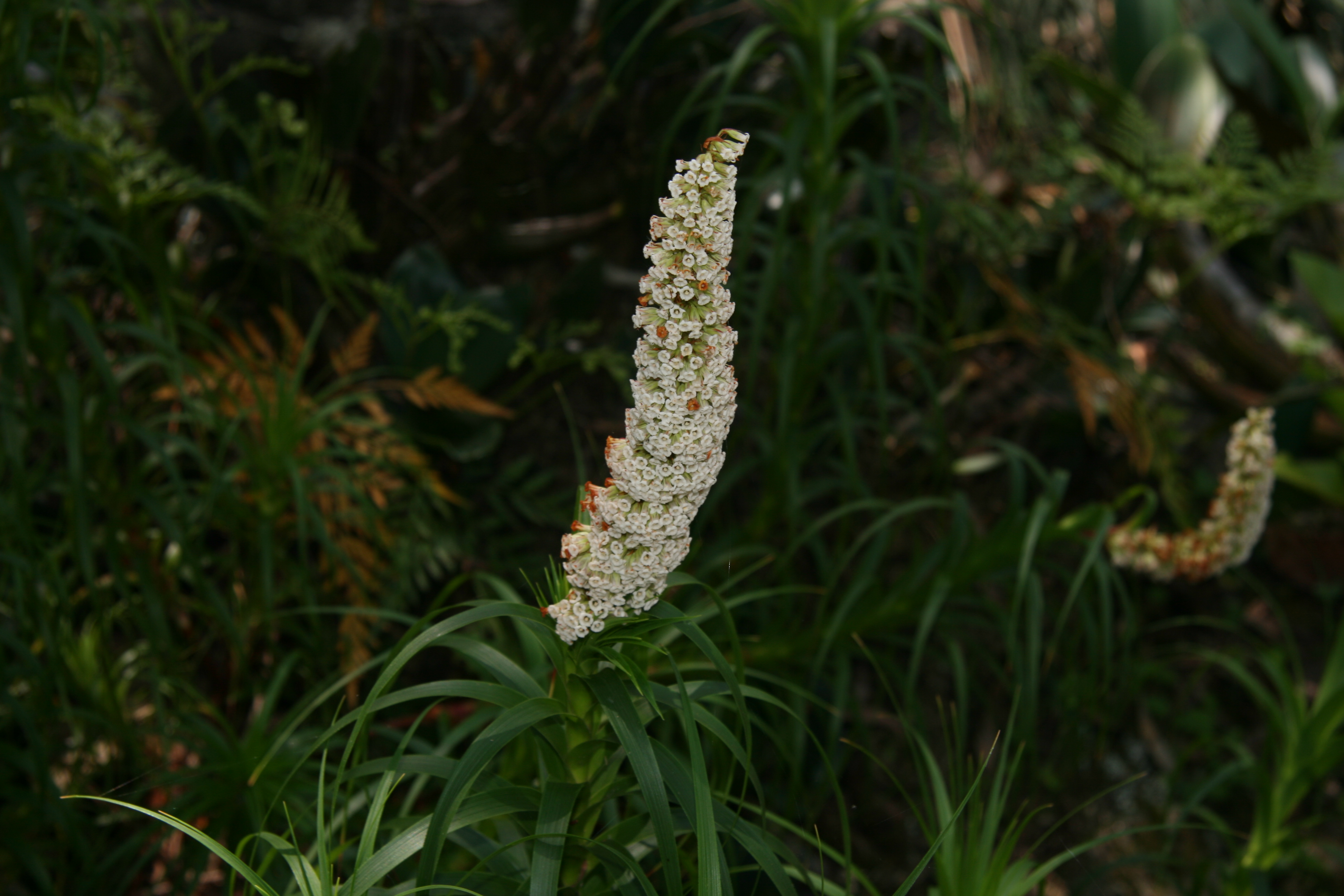

Scientific classification
- Kingdom: Plantae
- Clade: Tracheophytes
- Clade: Angiosperms
- Clade: Eudicots
- Clade: Asterids
- Order: Ericales
- Family: Ericaceae
- Genus: Dracophyllum
- Species: D. oceanicum

Binomial name
- Dracophyllum oceanicum E.A.Br. & N.Streiber

= Dracophyllum oceanicum =

Species of flowering plant

Dracophyllum oceanicum is a species of flowering plant in the family Ericaceae. It is endemic to New South Wales.
