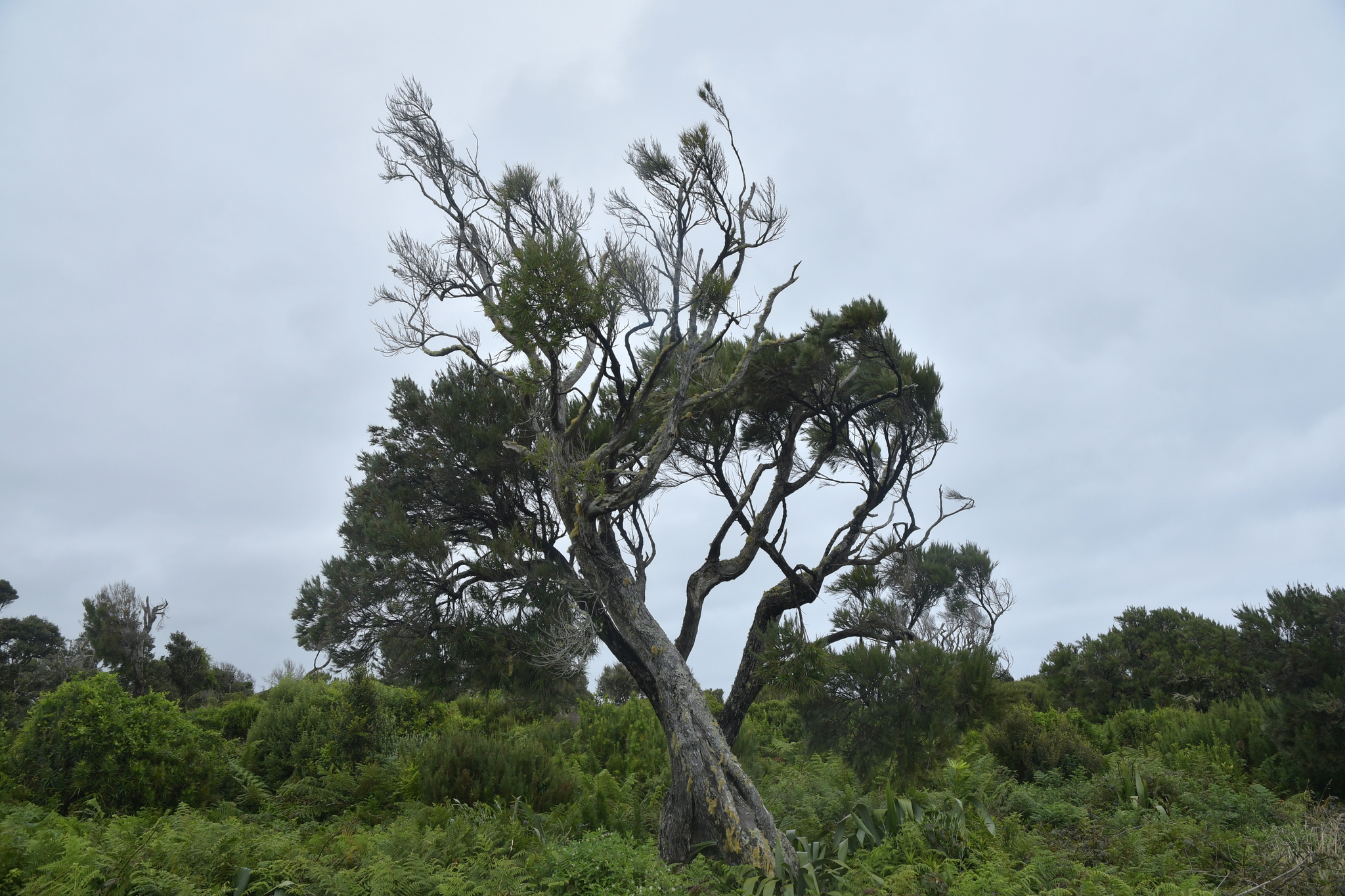
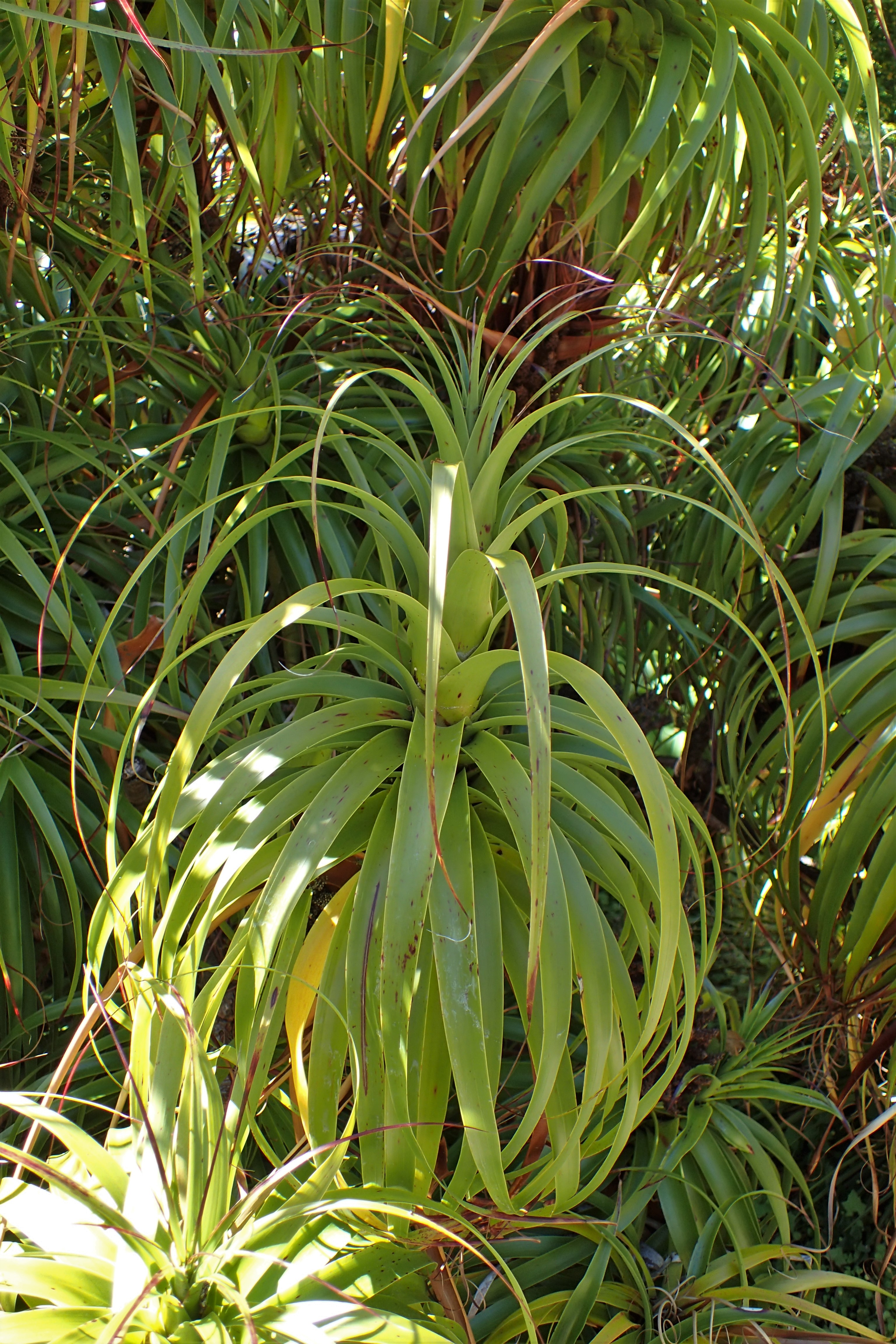
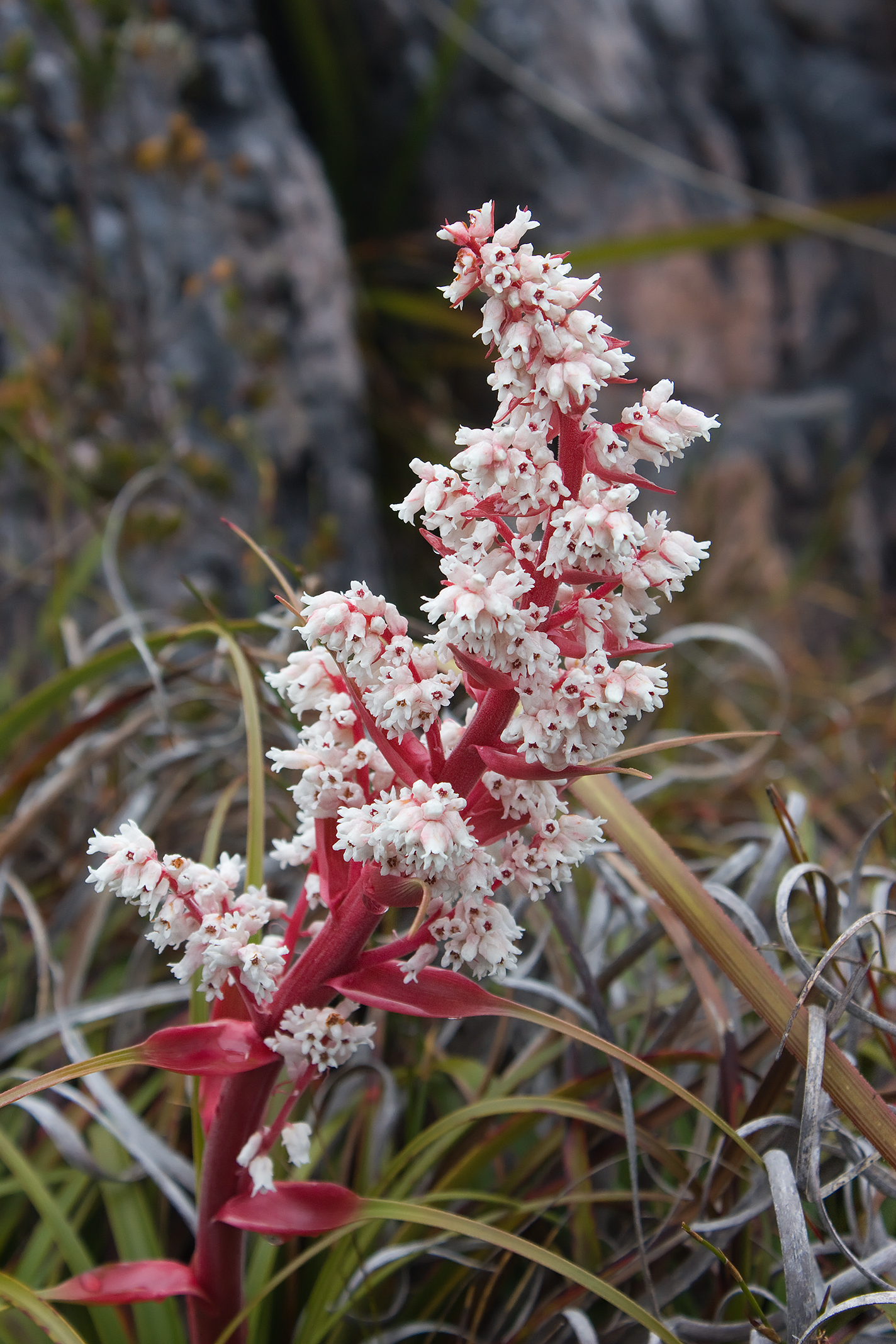
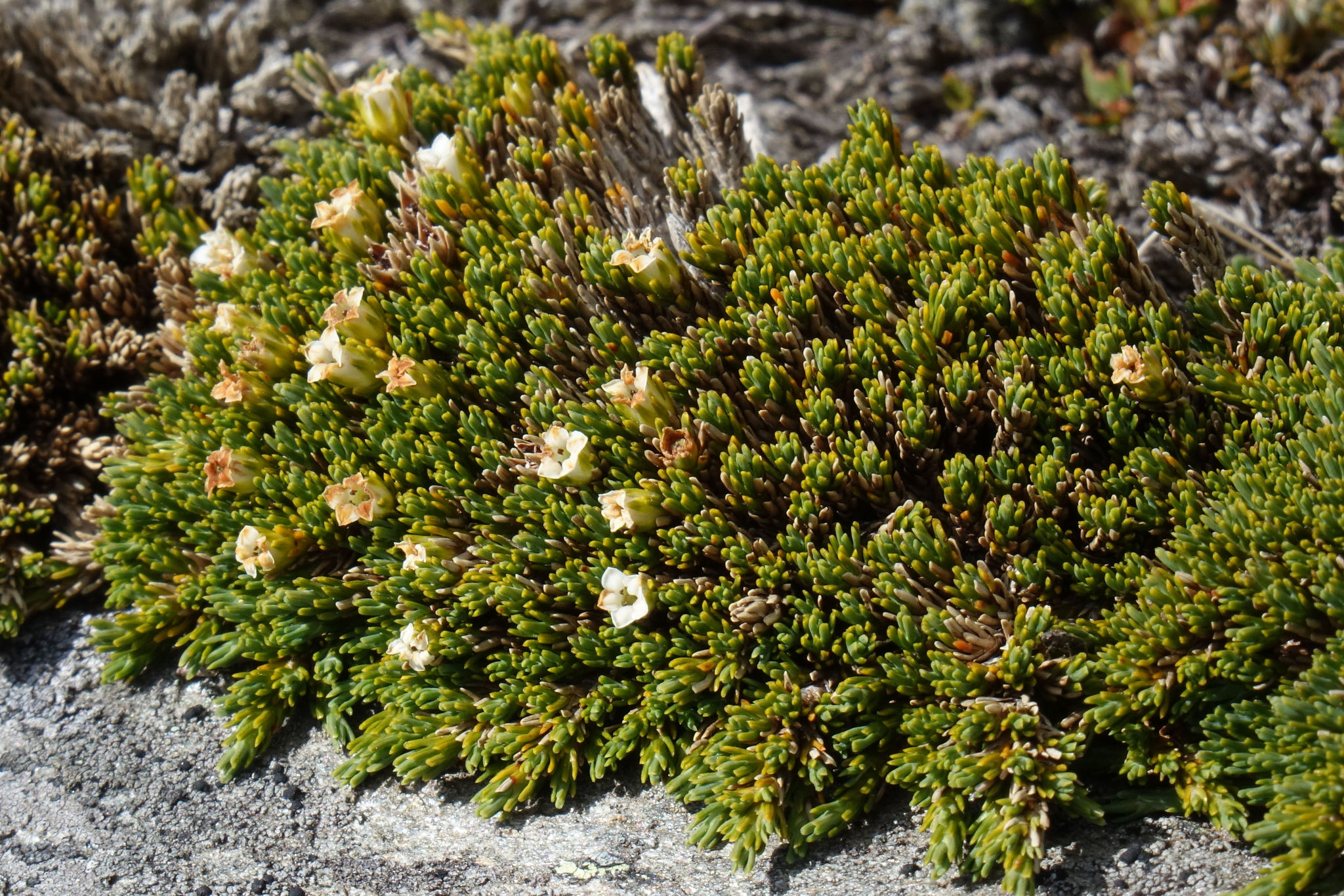
- Clockwise from top: D. arboreum, D. milliganii, D. traversii, D. muscoides

Scientific classification
- Kingdom: Plantae
- Clade: Tracheophytes
- Clade: Angiosperms
- Clade: Eudicots
- Clade: Asterids
- Order: Ericales
- Family: Ericaceae
- Subfamily: Epacridoideae
- Tribe: Richeeae
- Genus: Dracophyllum; Labill.
- Approximate distribution Range

= Dracophyllum =

Genus of flowering plants

Dracophyllum is a genus of plants in the family Ericaceae (heaths and heathers). There are 61 species in the genus, mostly shrubs, but also cushion plants and trees. They are found in New Zealand, Australia, Lord Howe Island and New Caledonia. Although dicotyledonous, they resemble primitive monocots, with their slender leaves concentrated in clumps at the ends of the branches. They are sometimes called grass-trees. New Zealand species are called neinei.

The height varies from 1 cm (0.39 in) (D. minimum) to about 12 m (39 ft) (D. longifolium).

== Taxonomy ==
Dracophyllum is a genus in the family Ericaceae published by Labill in Voy. 2: 210. T. 40 (1798), with 61 species and 2 varieties. The name means "dragon leaf", and was used due to the taxon's similar appearance to the Canary Islands dragon tree.

The first two specimens of the genus Dracophyllum were collected by J.R. Forster and his son J. G. A. Forster in March 1773 in Fiordland, New Zealand and described as two different species Epacris longifolia (Dracophyllum longifolium) and Epacris rosmarinifolia (Dracophyllum rosmarinifolium). Now the genus Epacris is used to describe an endemic Australian genus of 40 species other than the one published by the Forsters. In 1800, the genus name Dracophyllum was used for the first time by Labillardière to describe a plant specimen collected in New Caledonia. Ten years after the first Dracophyllum species was published, Robert Brown divided the genus into two subgenera: Dracophyllum and Sphenotoma based on some distinct morphological traits of corolla, stamens, bracts, and inflorescence. The first full description of the genus Dracophyllum was published by De Candolle in 1838 and was included in the family Epacrideae. In 1844, Hooker gave the first full descriptions of the species and the species relationships, mentioning that Sphenotoma had been raised to genus level by Sweet in 1827. A century later, Dracophyllum (as Eudracophyllum), Oreothamnus had been raised to subgenus level and Cordophyllum was described as a third subgenus by Oliver in 1928. Sphenotoma was removed from the genus.

Traditionally, Dracophyllum is divided into three subgenera: subgenus Dracophyllum with 20 species found across New Zealand, Australia, Tasmania, Lord Howe Island, and New Caledonia; subgenus Cordophyllum with one species in New Caledonia; and subgenus Oreothamnus with 29 species in New Zealand and Tasmania.

=== Genetics ===
While theorised to have originated on Australia, the greatest number of species of Dracophyllum is present in New Zealand. Dracophyllum has been found closely related to Richea and Sphenotoma, which are two genera endemic to south-eastern Australia and south-western Australia respectively. The three genera form a prominent clade in the strict consensus tree based on a molecular analysis by Crayn et al. in 1998.

== Names ==
The Māori language name neinei has a cognate in Rarotongan language, which is used to describe the plant Fitchia speciosa. There are a variety of English language names used to describe plants in this genus, including grass tree, pineapple tree, kerosene wood (due to its use as a firestarter), spiderwood (due to the spider web pattern seen on the wood), and colloquially as the Dr. Seuss tree, due to their similarity to the truffula trees from the book The Lorax (1971).

== Cultural uses ==
In traditional Māori culture, Dracophyllum wood was valued for its use as timber to create walking sticks and staffs, often by use of tohunga.

== Species ==
The following species are recognised by The Plant List:

- Dracophyllum acerosum Berggr.
- Dracophyllum adamsii Petrie
- Dracophyllum alticola Däniker
- Dracophyllum arboreum Cockayne
- Dracophyllum × arcuatum W.R.B.Oliv.
- Dracophyllum balansae Virot
- Dracophyllum cosmelioides W.R.B.Oliv.
- Dracophyllum × densiflorum W.R.B.Oliv.
- Dracophyllum densum W.R.B.Oliv.
- Dracophyllum elegantissimum S.Venter
- Dracophyllum × erectum W.R.B.Oliv.
- Dracophyllum filifolium Hook.f.
- Dracophyllum fiordense W.R.B.Oliv.
- Dracophyllum fitzgeraldii C.Moore & F.Muell.
- Dracophyllum × insulare W.R.B.Oliv.
- Dracophyllum involucratum Brongn. & Gris
- Dracophyllum kirkii Berggr.
- Dracophyllum latifolium A.Cunn.
- Dracophyllum lessonianum A.Rich.
- Dracophyllum longifolium (J.R.Forst. & G.Forst.) R.Br. ex Roem. & Schult.
- Dracophyllum mackeeanum S.Venter
- Dracophyllum macranthum E.A.Br. & Streiber
- Dracophyllum × marginatum W.R.B.Oliv.
- Dracophyllum marmoricola S.Venter
- Dracophyllum matthewsii (Carse) Carse
- Dracophyllum menziesii Hook.f.
- Dracophyllum milliganii Hook.f.
- Dracophyllum minimum F.Muell.
- Dracophyllum muscoides Hook.f.
- Dracophyllum oceanicum E.A.Br. & Streiber
- Dracophyllum oliveri Du Rietz
- Dracophyllum ophioliticum S.Venter
- Dracophyllum ouaiemense Virot
- Dracophyllum paludosum Cockayne
- Dracophyllum palustre W.R.B.Oliv.
- Dracophyllum patens W.R.B.Oliv.
- Dracophyllum pearsonii Kirk
- Dracophyllum politum (Cheeseman) Cockayne
- Dracophyllum pronum W.R.B.Oliv.
- Dracophyllum prostratum Kirk
- Dracophyllum pubescens Cheeseman
- Dracophyllum pyramidale W.R.B.Oliv.
- Dracophyllum ramosum Pancher ex Brongn. & Gris
- Dracophyllum recurvum Hook.f.
- Dracophyllum rosmarinifolium (G.Forst.) R.Br.
- Dracophyllum × saxicola W.R.B.Oliv.
- Dracophyllum sayeri F.Muell.
- Dracophyllum scoparium Hook.f.
- Dracophyllum secundum R.Br.
- Dracophyllum sinclairii Cheeseman
- Dracophyllum strictum Hook.f.
- Dracophyllum subulatum Hook.f.
- Dracophyllum townsonii Cheeseman
- Dracophyllum traversii Hook.f.
- Dracophyllum trimorphum W.R.B.Oliv.
- Dracophyllum uniflorum Hook.f.
- Dracophyllum urvilleanum A.Rich.
- Dracophyllum × varium Colenso
- Dracophyllum verticillatum Labill.
- Dracophyllum viride W.R.B.Oliv.
- Dracophyllum × vulcanicum W.R.B.Oliv.

=== New Zealand ===
Among the New Zealand species (all of which are endemic) are:

- D. arboreum, tarahinau or Chatham Island grass tree. Tree-like growth to 10 m with a distinct juvenile phase, found in the Chatham Islands.
- D. acerosum, 2m tall shrub found in Southern Marlborough and Canterbury in the South Island.
- D. densum, small shrub found on high mountain tops in the South Island.
- D. elegantissimum, 14m tall tree found only in North-west Nelson in the South Island.
- D. filifolium, 4m tall shrub / tree found in both the North and South Islands.
- D. fiordense, western Otago and Fiordland
- D. kirkii, small shrub found in Canterbury and Westland in the South Island.
- D. latifolium, neinei or spiderwood. Found in the North Island, from Mangonui southwards to North Taranaki and the Mahia Peninsula, growing from sea level to 1,100 m (Salmon 1973:271). Usually found growing under kauri.
- D. lessonianum, wi-wi. Although it can grow up to 10 m high, it most frequently is seen as a straggly shrub.
- D. longifolium, inanga or inaka. Growing to 12 m tall, this is the most widespread species in New Zealand, found from sea level up to 1200 m, in subalpine regions, from the middle of the North Island to as far south as the Auckland Islands.
- D. mathewsii, D. viride and D. sinclairii are found only in the far north of Tai Tokerau.
- D. marmoricola, 15 cm tall prostrate shrub found in Kahurangi National Park in North-west Nelson.
- D. menziesii is a multi-branched shrub that grows to 2 m. It grows in high rainfall areas in high montane to sub-alpine herbfields in Western Otago, Fiordland and Stewart Island / Rakiura.
- D. muscoides, small cushion found in the South Island.
- D. oliveri, 1 - 4m tall shrub / tree found only in the South Island.
- D. ophioliticum, 2m tall shrub found only in North-west Nelson.
- D. palustre, 1m tall shrub found only on the west coast (region) of the South Island.
- D. patens, 3m tall shrub / tree found only in the North Island.
- D. pearsonii, 50 cm tall shrub found in boggy and damp areas in the South Island.
- D. politum, small cushion found from lowland to subalpine in the South Island. Cushion-like grows up to 0.5m tall and 1m in diameter with small, narrow leaves covering the twigs. Blooms small white flowers from December to March.
- D. prostratum, small prostrate shrub found in montane to subalpine areas in the South Island.
- D. pronum, small shrub found in the South Island, mostly east of the Southern Alps
- D. pubescens, small prostrate shrub found only in low alpine areas in North-west Nelson.
- D. pyramidale, a very slender, almost fragile tree, growing up to 10 m high. Grows between Great Barrier Island and the Kaimai Range.
- D. recurvum, a 1m shrub with curled leaves, found in sub-alpine to high alpine regions of the Central Plateau of the North Island.
- D. rosmarinifolium, bushy 1m tall shrub found in both the North and South Islands.
- D. scoparium, 4m tall shrub / tree found in the Chatham and Campbell Islands. the species can extend its range to poorly drained area as a stunted shrub. Forms a hybrid swarm with D. longifolium.
- D. sinclairii, 6m tall shrub / tree found only in the North Island.
- D. strictum, 3m tall shrub / tree found only in coastal parts of the North Island.
- D. subulatum, 2m tall shrub found in tussockland in central North Island.
- D. townsonii, very similar to the neinei, grows mainly in the Nelson area and the West Coast of the South Island.
- D. traversii, mountain neinei. Growing to 13 m tall and found above 750 m in the top half of the South Island, also in scattered places in the North Island.
- D. trimorphum, 3m tall shrub / tree found only in North-west Nelson.
- D. uniflorum (var. frondosum), 1m tall shrub found in the South Island.
- D. uruvilleanum, 8m tall tree found only in the north half on the South Island (Marlborough and North-west Nelson).

=== Australia ===
- D. sayeri grows near the summit of Mount Bellenden Ker Queensland's second highest peak.
- D. macranthum, restricted to the Landsdowne area near Taree on the NSW coast.
- D. secundum found in mountainous heath and sheltered lowland gullies on sandstone in the Sydney basin.
- D. oceanicum from seaside cliffs near Jervis Bay NSW.
- D. milliganii from the highlands of Tasmania
- D. minimum, cushion plant from Tasmanian mountains, also widespread in NZ.
