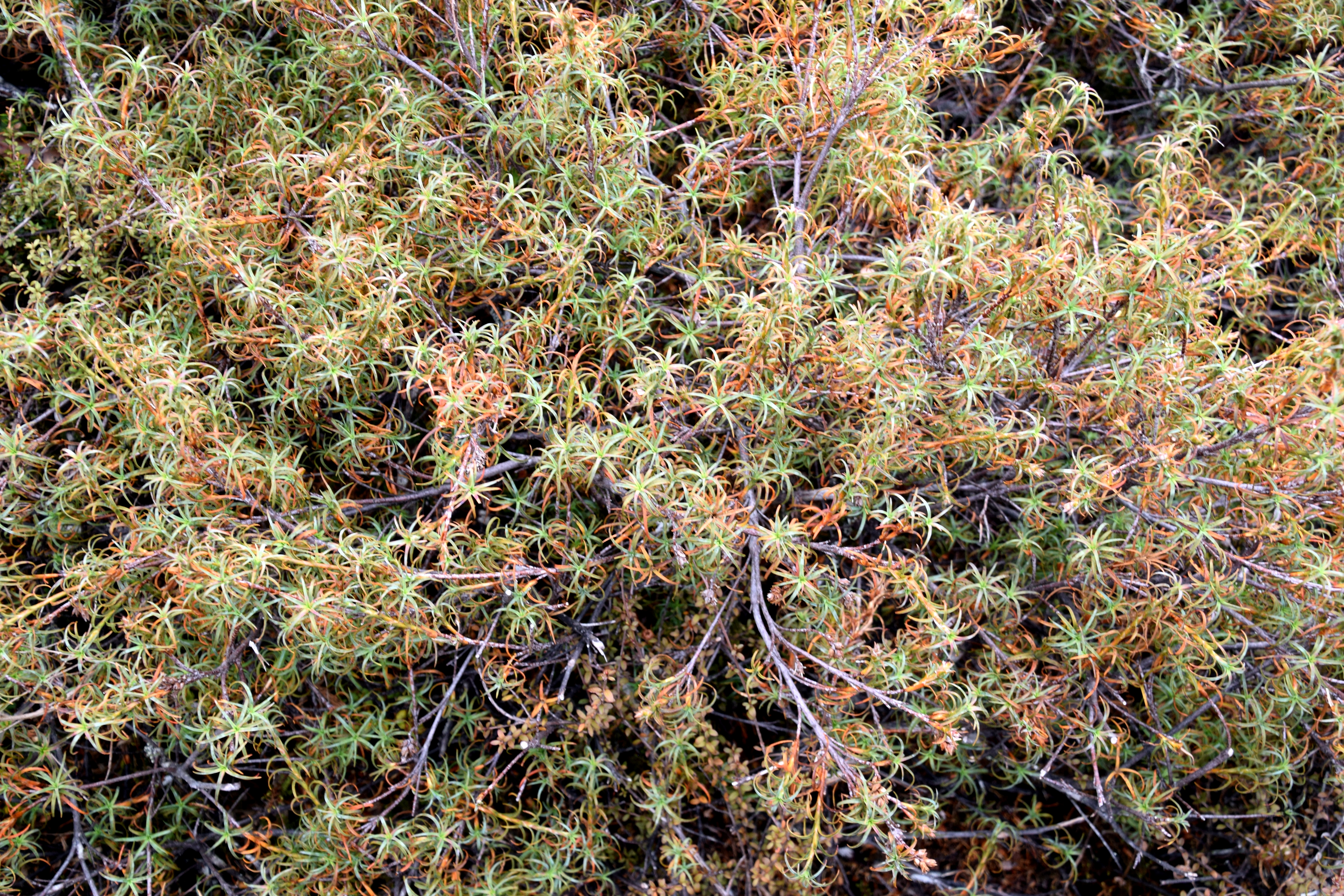
- Dracophyllum recurvum on Mt Tongariro

Scientific classification
- Kingdom: Plantae
- Clade: Tracheophytes
- Clade: Angiosperms
- Clade: Eudicots
- Clade: Asterids
- Order: Ericales
- Family: Ericaceae
- Genus: Dracophyllum
- Species: D. recurvum

Binomial name
- Dracophyllum recurvum Hook.f.

= Dracophyllum recurvum =

Species of flowering plant

Dracophyllum recurvum, known commonly as curved leaf grass tree or neinei is a prostrate to semi-erect shrub belonging to the genus Dracophyllum.

== Description ==
Dracophyllum recurvum grows up to one metre high at lower altitudes, or down to less than five centimetres at higher altitudes. The plant's branches are covered in a greyish bark, and its leaves vary from dark green at lower altitudes to reds and greys at higher altitudes. Leaves are 10–40 millimetres (0.39–1.57 in) in length and usually approximately 2 millimetres (0.079 in) wide. The physical characteristics of D. recurvum vary greatly with changes in altitude.

It is distinguishable from other species in the genus by its thin, recurved leaves.

== Distribution ==
Dracophyllum recurvum grows in subalpine and alpine environments in the volcanic Central Plateau of the North Island of New Zealand. It is especially plentiful on Mount Ruapehu and the other mountains of Tongariro National Park. D. recurvum is one of the few plant species that can survive the extreme conditions on Ruapehu, due to its wide-spreading root system, which firmly anchors the plant to the thin soil, as well as helping halt erosion on the mountain.
