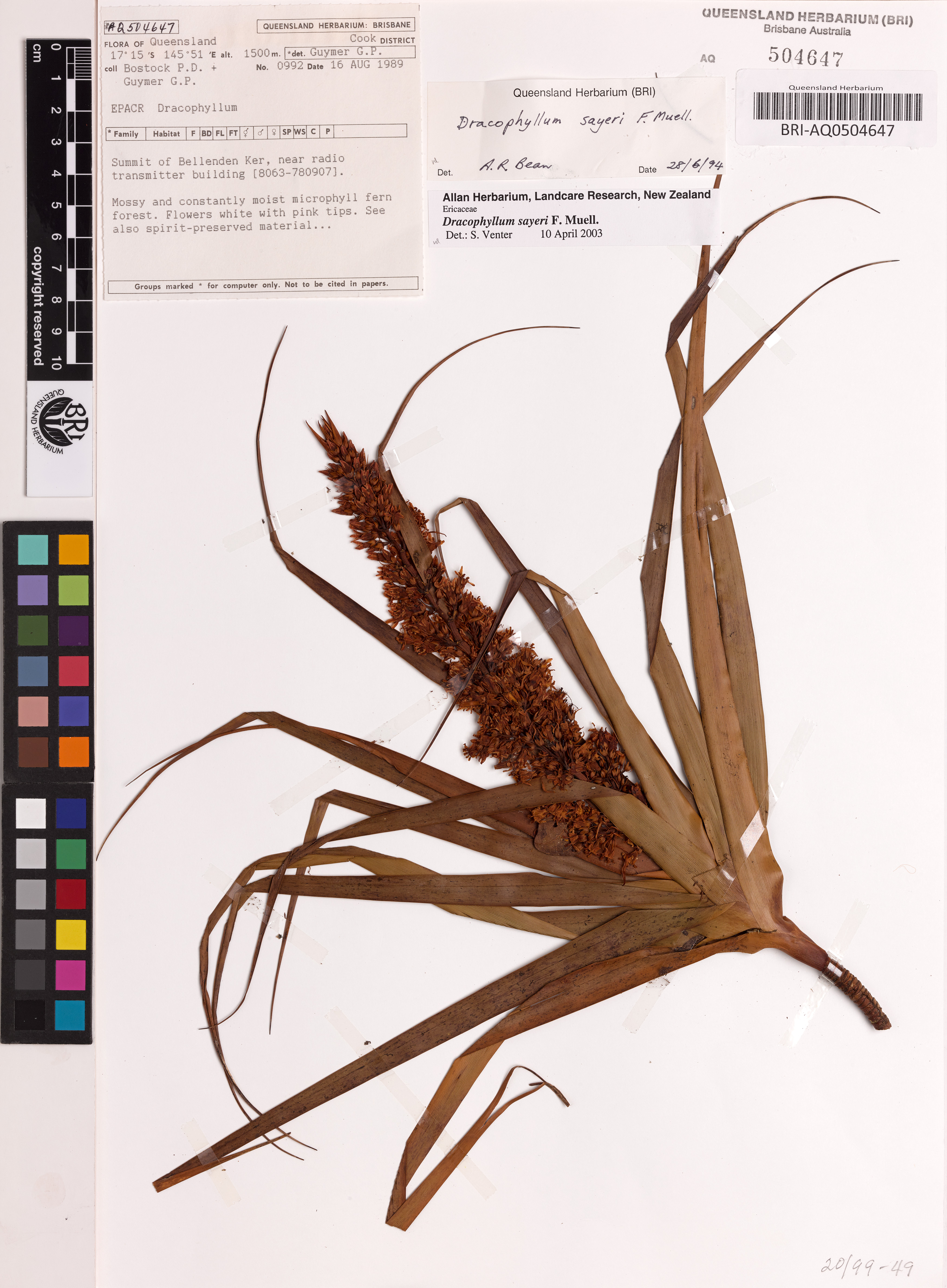
- Herbarium specimen

Scientific classification
- Kingdom: Plantae
- Clade: Tracheophytes
- Clade: Angiosperms
- Clade: Eudicots
- Clade: Asterids
- Order: Ericales
- Family: Ericaceae
- Genus: Dracophyllum
- Species: D. sayeri

Binomial name
- Dracophyllum sayeri F. Mueller

= Dracophyllum sayeri =

Species of flowering plant

Dracophyllum sayeri is a non-herbaceous plant in the genus Dracophyllum, endemic to North Queensland. The plant has green leaves approximately 20-50 centimetres in length when mature. Inflorescence are approximately 15-25 centimetres in length and range from a light red colour to cream.

The species has been found in Goldsborough Valley State Forest and Mount Lewis National Park.
