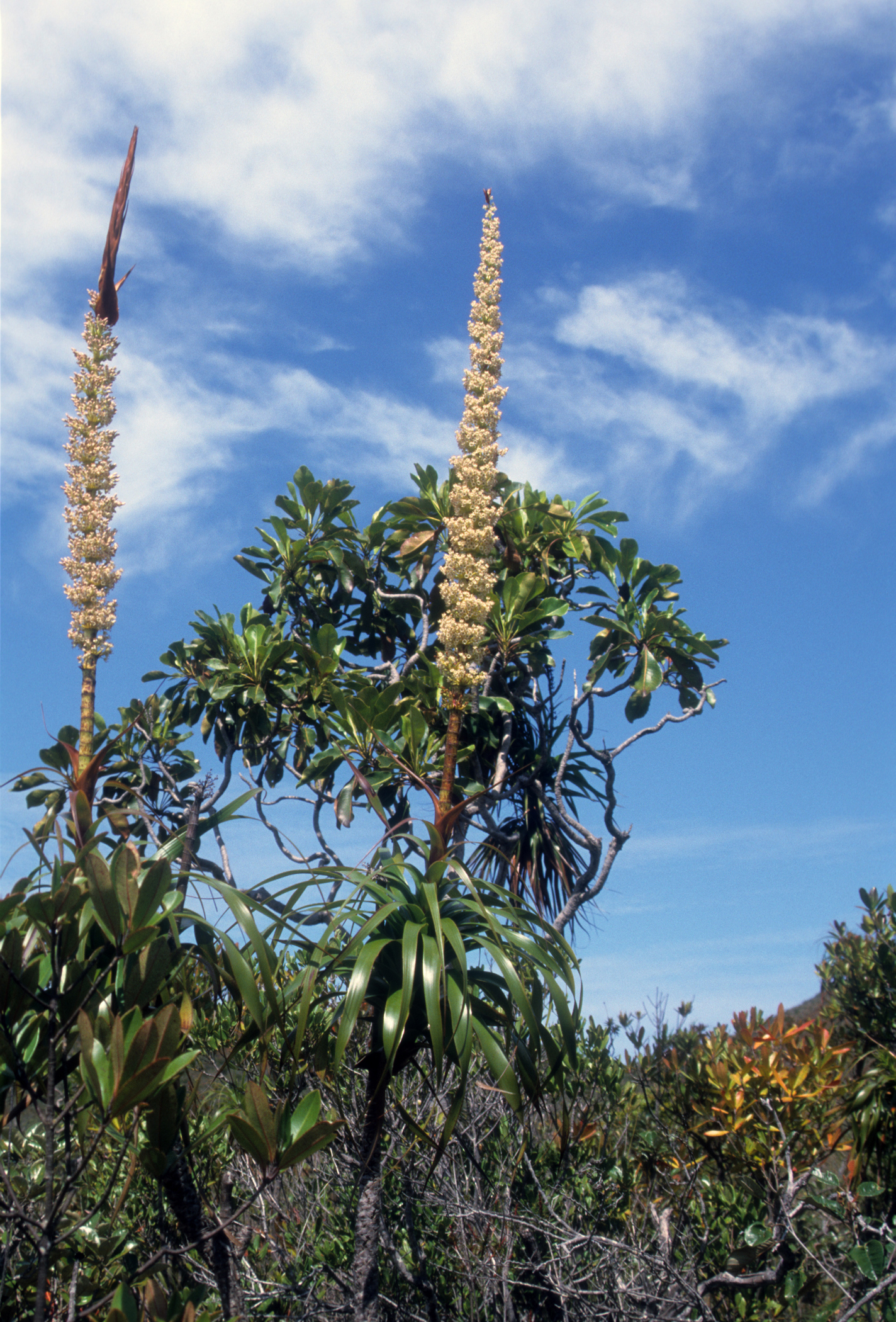

Scientific classification
- Kingdom: Plantae
- Clade: Embryophytes
- Clade: Tracheophytes
- Clade: Angiosperms
- Clade: Eudicots
- Clade: Asterids
- Order: Ericales
- Family: Ericaceae
- Genus: Dracophyllum
- Species: D. verticillatum

Binomial name
- Dracophyllum verticillatum Labill.

Synonyms
- Dracophyllum dracaenoides Schltr.

= Dracophyllum verticillatum =

Species of flowering plant in the heath family

Dracophyllum verticillatum is a species of shrub or small tree endemic to New Caledonia. It was first described by Jacques Labillardière in 1800 and gets the specific epithet verticillatum for its flowers growing on verticillasters. In the heath family Ericaceae, it inhabits exposed plains and gentle mountain slopes and reaches a height of 0.2–7 m (0.7–23.0 ft) tall.
