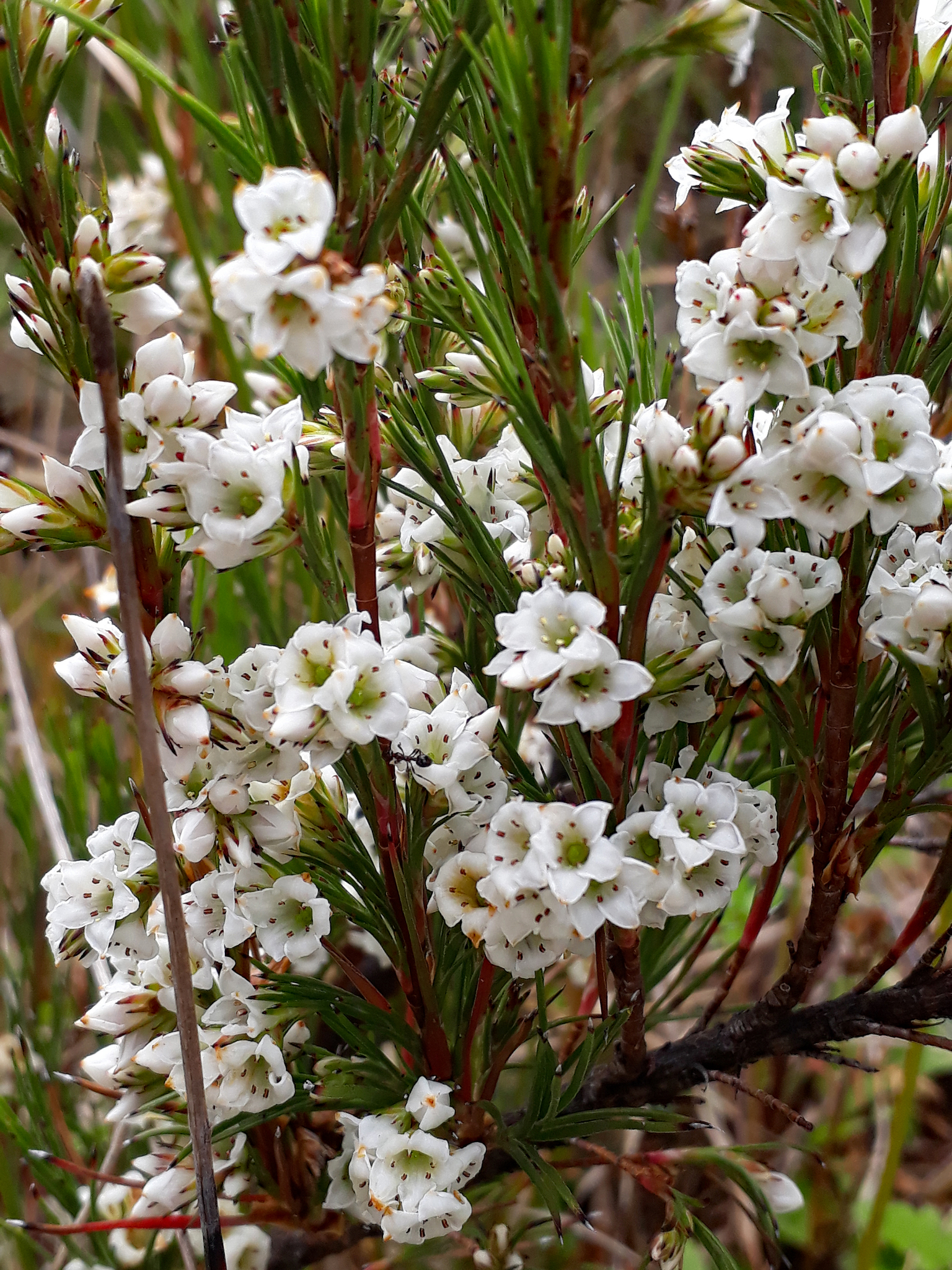

Conservation status
- Naturally Uncommon (NZ TCS)

Scientific classification
- Kingdom: Plantae
- Clade: Tracheophytes
- Clade: Angiosperms
- Clade: Eudicots
- Clade: Asterids
- Order: Ericales
- Family: Ericaceae
- Genus: Dracophyllum
- Species: D. scoparium

Binomial name
- Dracophyllum scoparium Hook.f.

Synonyms
- D. scoparium var. paludosum (Cockayne) Cockayne; Dracophyllum paludosum Cockayne; Dracophyllum urvilleanum var. scoparium Hook.f.; Dracophyllum subantarcticum Cockayne nom. nud.

= Dracophyllum scoparium =

Species of flowering plant in the heath family

Dracophyllum scoparium is a species of shrub or small tree endemic to the Chatham Islands of New Zealand. It was first described by Joseph Dalton Hooker in 1844 and gets the specific epithet scoparium, in the form of a broom, for the way in which its juvenile leaves grow. In the heath family Ericaceae, it inhabits the Chatham and Pitt Islands, and reaches a height of 1–4 m (3.3–13.1 ft).
