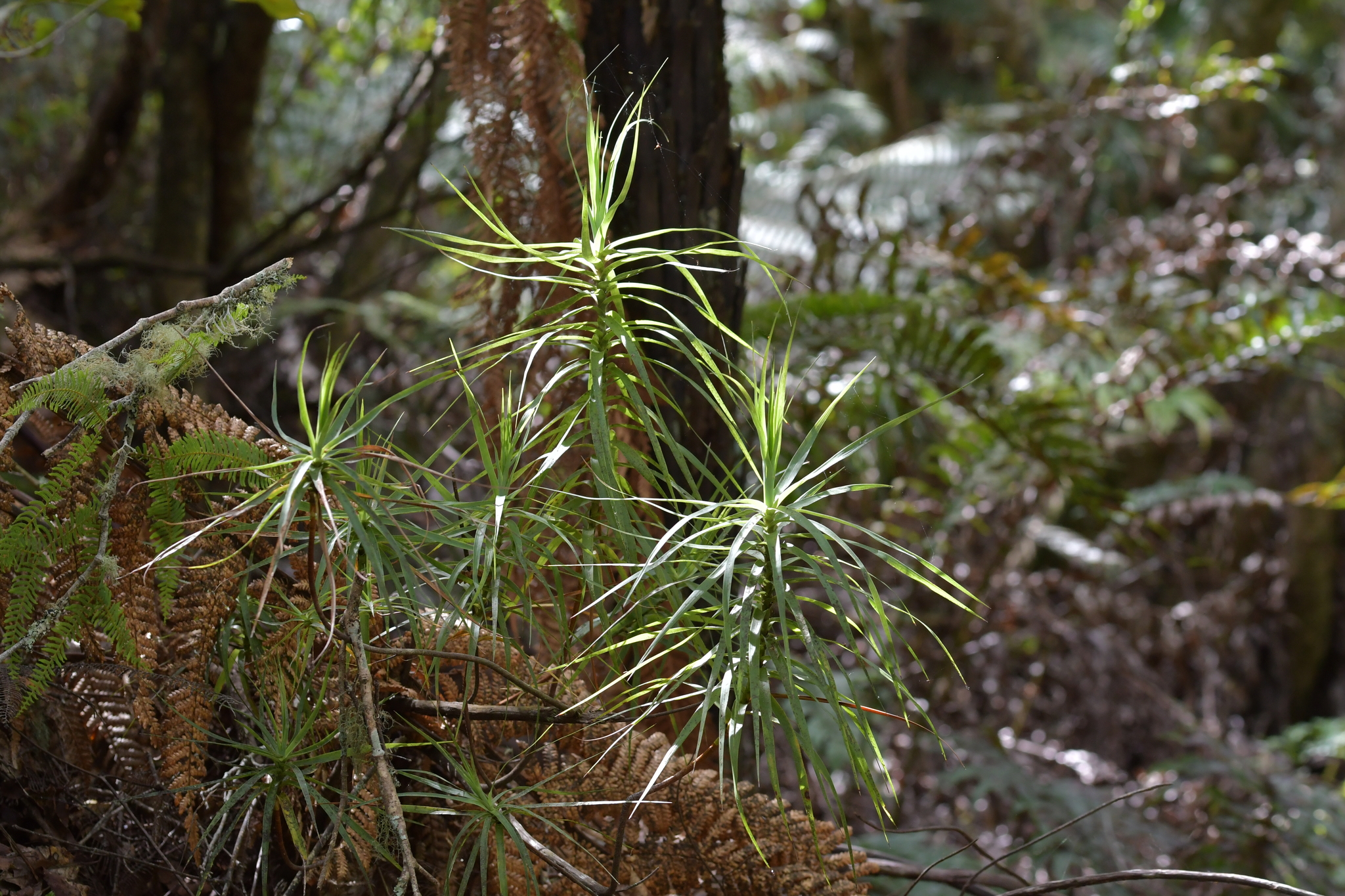

Scientific classification
- Kingdom: Plantae
- Clade: Tracheophytes
- Clade: Angiosperms
- Clade: Eudicots
- Clade: Asterids
- Order: Ericales
- Family: Ericaceae
- Genus: Dracophyllum
- Species: D. strictum

Binomial name
- Dracophyllum strictum Hook.f.

Synonyms
- Dracophyllum affine Hook.f.; Dracophyllum featonianum Colenso

= Dracophyllum strictum =

Species of flowering plant in the heath family

Dracophyllum strictum, commonly known as totorowhiti, is a species of shrub endemic to New Zealand. It was first described by Joseph Dalton Hooker in 1844 and gets the specific epithet strictum for its rigid and packed together leaves. In the heath family Ericaceae, it inhabits lowland up to montane forest and shrubland.

== Description ==
It is a shrub to small tree reaches 0.5–3 m (2–10 ft) in height. The bark on older branches is dark brown while young stems are yellowish-brown. It has linear-triangular leaves arranged spirally along the branches. The flowers are white to light pink, appearing on red stalks in clusters at the end of branches.
