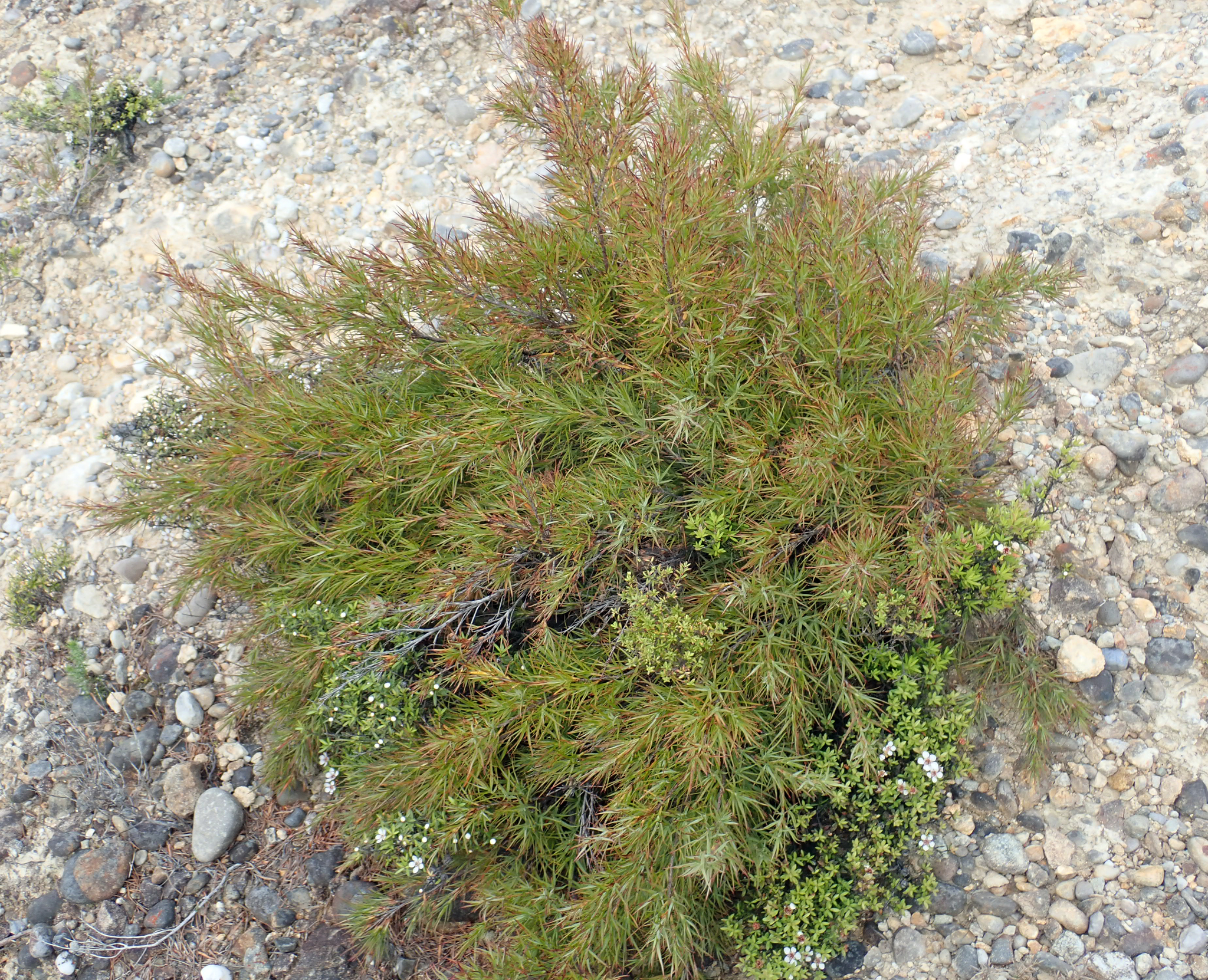

Conservation status
- Naturally Uncommon (NZ TCS)

Scientific classification
- Kingdom: Plantae
- Clade: Tracheophytes
- Clade: Angiosperms
- Clade: Eudicots
- Clade: Asterids
- Order: Ericales
- Family: Ericaceae
- Genus: Dracophyllum
- Species: D. trimorphum

Binomial name
- Dracophyllum trimorphum W.R.B.Oliv.

= Dracophyllum trimorphum =

Species of flowering plant in the heath family

Dracophyllum trimorphum, commonly known as inaka and dracophyllum, is a species of shrub or small tree endemic to north-west Nelson in New Zealand's South Island. It was first described by Walter Oliver in 1952 and gets the specific epithet trimorphum for its three phases of growth. In the heath family Ericaceae, it inhabits cliffs and steep slopes near the coast and reaches a height of 0.2–3.0 m (1–10 ft). A 2017 assessment using the New Zealand Threat Classification System classified it as "Naturally Uncommon", giving it an estimated habitat area of less than 10 km^{2} (1,000.0 ha).
