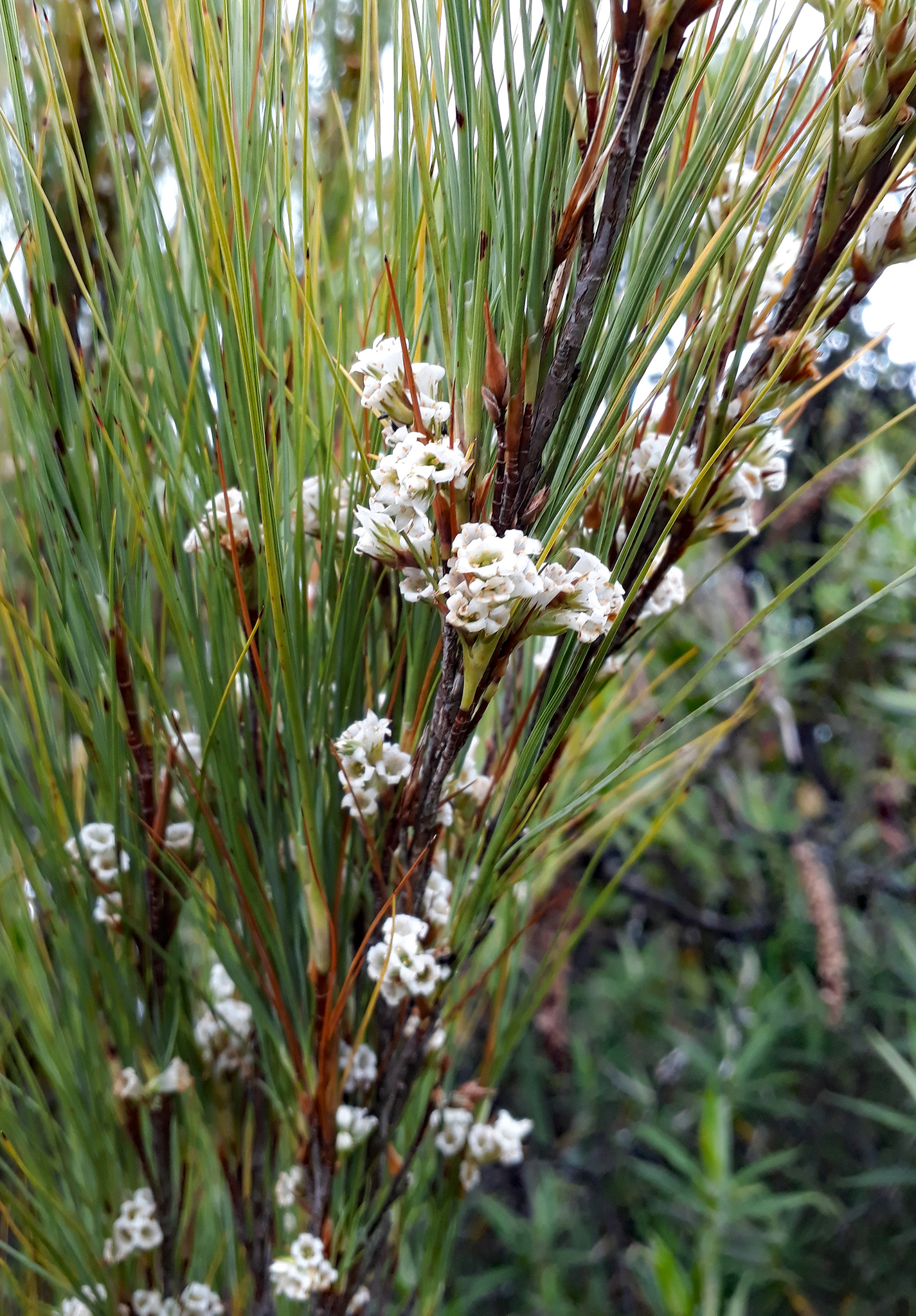

Conservation status
- Not Threatened (NZ TCS)

Scientific classification
- Kingdom: Plantae
- Clade: Tracheophytes
- Clade: Angiosperms
- Clade: Eudicots
- Clade: Asterids
- Order: Ericales
- Family: Ericaceae
- Genus: Dracophyllum
- Species: D. filifolium

Binomial name
- Dracophyllum filifolium Hook.f.

Synonyms
- Alphabetical list: Dracophyllum setifolium Stchegl.; Dracophyllum pungens Colenso; Dracophyllum virgatum Colenso; Dracophyllum heterophyllum Colenso; Dracophyllum ×vulcanicum; Dracophyllum urvillianum var. filifolium Cheeseman; Dracophyllum collinum W.R.B. Oliv.; Dracophyllum filifolium var. centrale W.R.B. Oliv.; Dracophyllum filifolium var. collinum W.R.B. Oliv.

= Dracophyllum filifolium =

Species of flowering plant in the heath family

Dracophyllum filifolium is a species of shrub or tree endemic to the North, South, and Stewart Islands of New Zealand. It was first described by Joseph Dalton Hooker in 1853 and gets the specific epithet filifolium for its leaves being like a filament. In the heath family Ericaceae, it inhabits mountain slopes, saddles and ridges and reaches a height of 1–4 m (3–13 ft). A 2017 assessment using the New Zealand Threat Classification System classified it as "Not Threatened", giving it an estimated population of more than 100,000.
