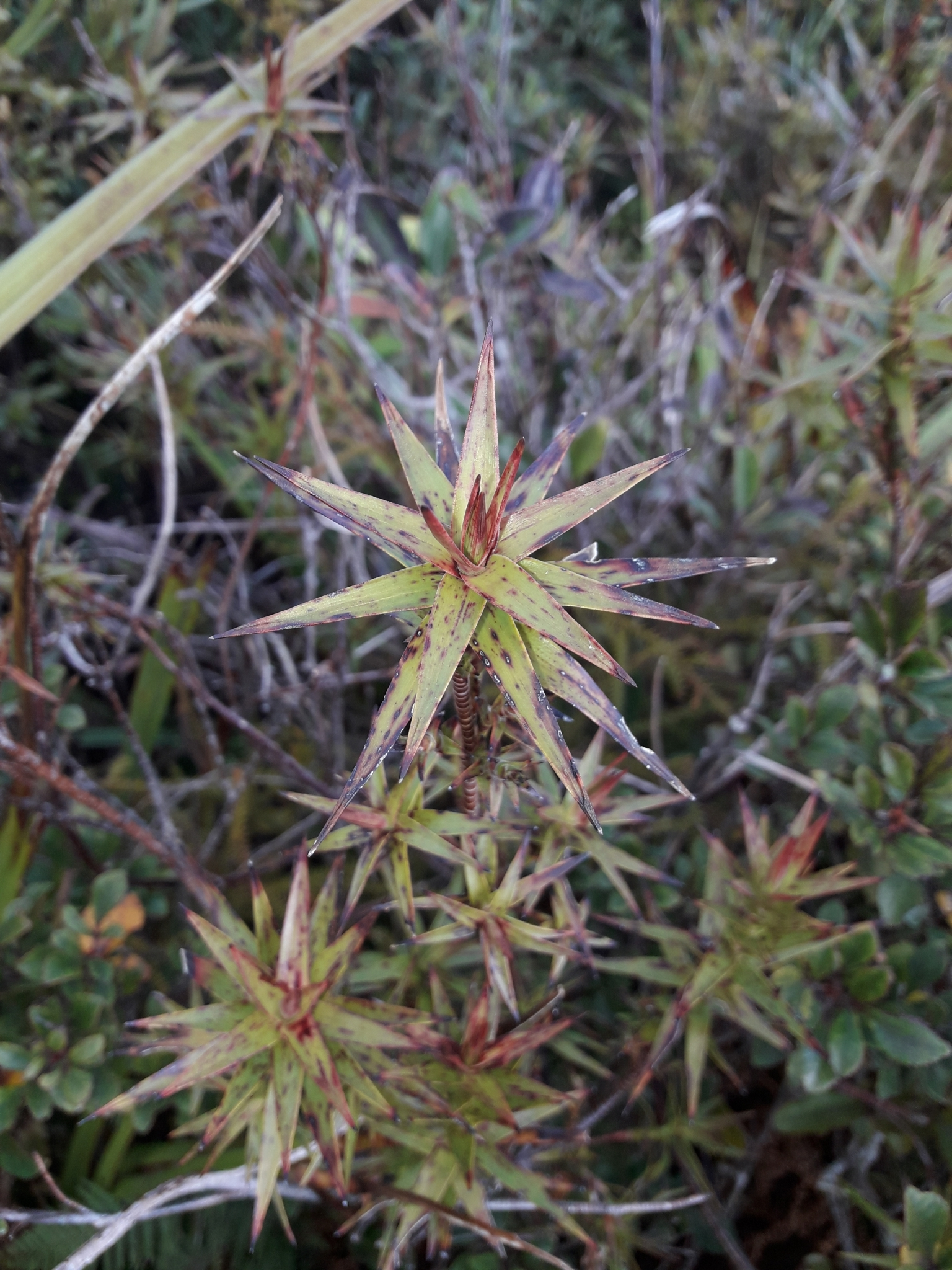

Scientific classification
- Kingdom: Plantae
- Clade: Tracheophytes
- Clade: Angiosperms
- Clade: Eudicots
- Clade: Asterids
- Order: Ericales
- Family: Ericaceae
- Genus: Dracophyllum
- Species: D. patens

Binomial name
- Dracophyllum patens W.R.B.Oliv.
- Approximate distribution Range

= Dracophyllum patens =

Species of flowering plant

Dracophyllum patens, commonly called Great Barrier Inaka, is a species of plant in the family Ericaceae that is endemic to New Zealand.
