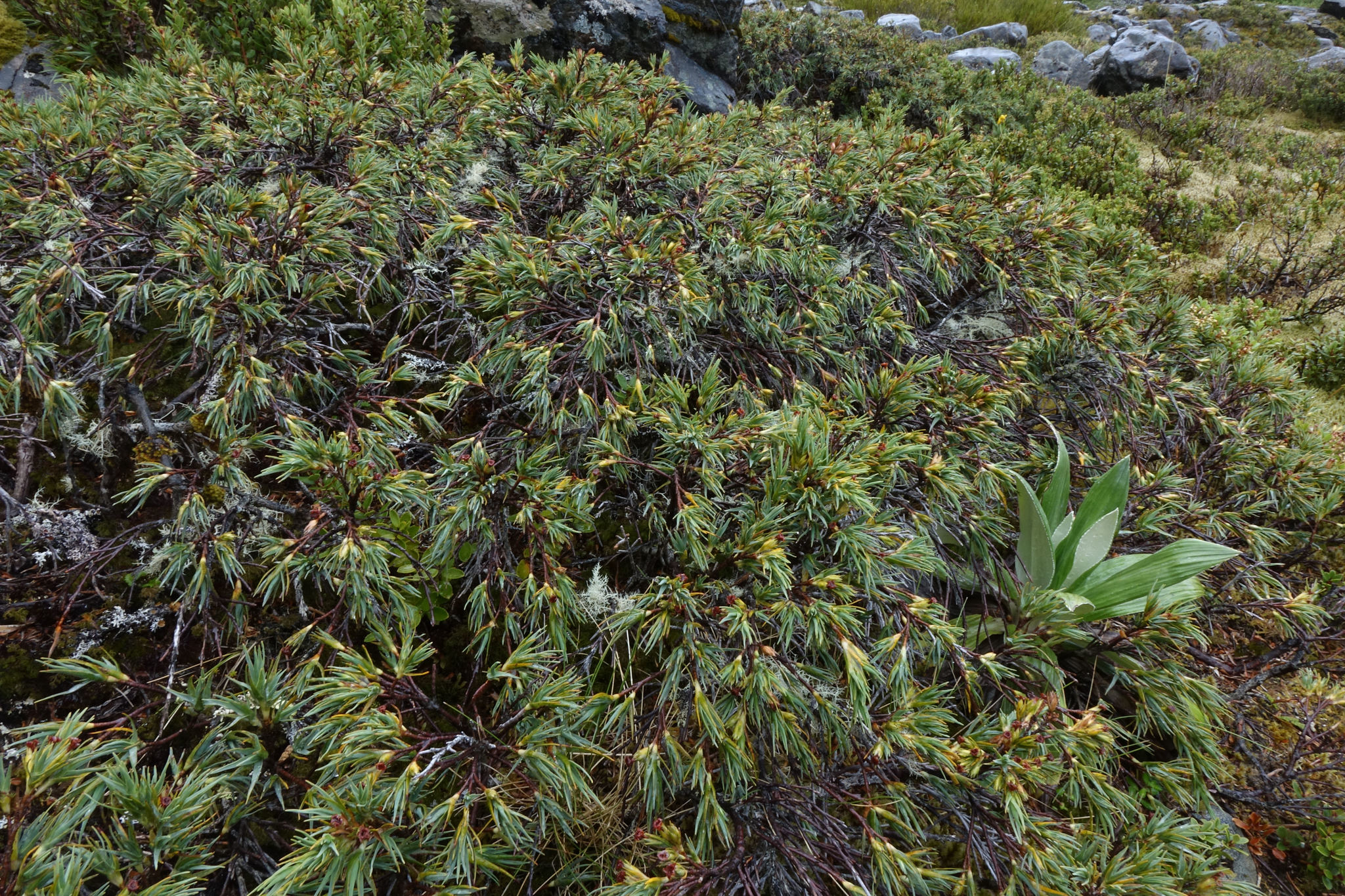

Conservation status
- Not Threatened (NZ TCS)

Scientific classification
- Kingdom: Plantae
- Clade: Tracheophytes
- Clade: Angiosperms
- Clade: Eudicots
- Clade: Asterids
- Order: Ericales
- Family: Ericaceae
- Genus: Dracophyllum
- Species: D. kirkii

Binomial name
- Dracophyllum kirkii Berggr.

Synonyms
- Dracophyllum uniflorum Berggr. nom. illegit.

= Dracophyllum kirkii =

Species of flowering plant in the heath family

Dracophyllum kirkii is a species of shrub endemic to the South Island of New Zealand. It was first described by Sven Berggren in 1877 and gets the specific epithet kirkii after the New Zealand botanist Thomas Kirk. In the heath family Ericaceae, it inhabits mountain slopes and bluffs and reaches a height of just 20–140 cm (8–55 in). A 2017 assessment using the New Zealand Threat Classification System classified it as "Not Threatened", giving it an estimated population of more than 100,000.
