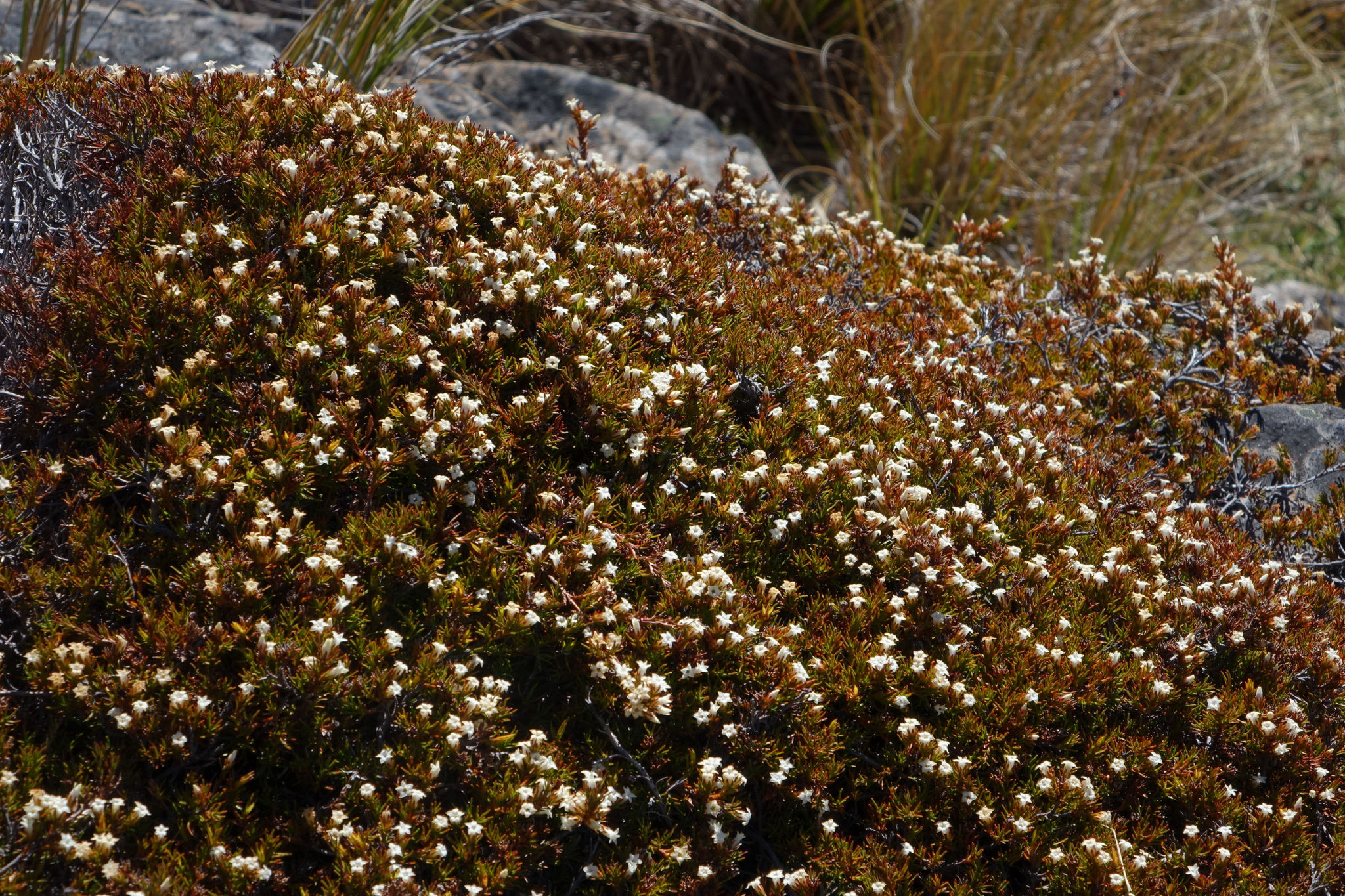

Scientific classification
- Kingdom: Plantae
- Clade: Tracheophytes
- Clade: Angiosperms
- Clade: Eudicots
- Clade: Asterids
- Order: Ericales
- Family: Ericaceae
- Genus: Dracophyllum
- Species: D. pronum

Binomial name
- Dracophyllum pronum W.R.B. Oliver

Synonyms
- Dracophyllum rosmarinifolium Hook.f.; Dracophyllum rosmarinifolium Cheeseman; Dracophyllum muscoides Armstrong; Dracophyllum rosmarinifolium Betts

= Dracophyllum pronum =

Species of flowering plant in the heath family

Dracophyllum pronum, commonly known as trailing neinei, is a species of sprawling shrub endemic to the South Island of New Zealand. It was first described by Walter Oliver in 1928 and gets the specific epithet pronum for its prostrate growth habit. In the heath family Ericaceae, it inhabits montane and subalpine areas and reaches a height of 1–25 cm (0.4–9.8 in).
