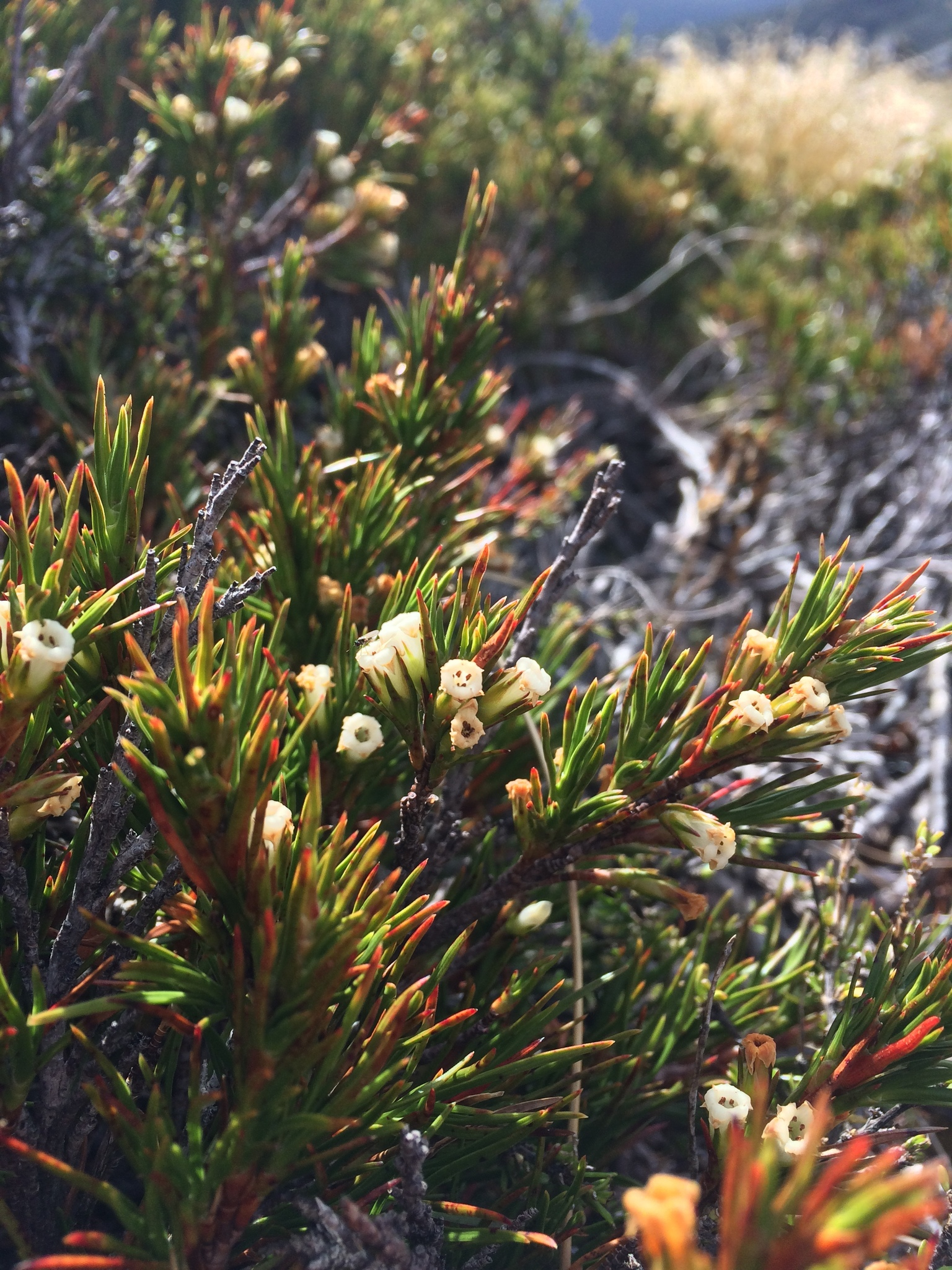

Scientific classification
- Kingdom: Plantae
- Clade: Tracheophytes
- Clade: Angiosperms
- Clade: Eudicots
- Clade: Asterids
- Order: Ericales
- Family: Ericaceae
- Genus: Dracophyllum
- Species: D. rosmarinifolium

Binomial name
- Dracophyllum rosmarinifolium (Forst.f.) R.Br. ex Roem. & Schult.

Synonyms
- Epacris rosmarinifolia Forst.f.; Dracophyllum uniflorum Hook.f.

= Dracophyllum rosmarinifolium =

Species of flowering plant in the heath family

Dracophyllum rosmarinifolium, commonly known as inaka and common grass tree, is a species of shrub endemic to the North and South Islands of New Zealand. It was first described by Georg Forster in 1786 as Eparcris rosmarinifolium and gets the specific epithet rosmarinifolium for its similarities to species from the former genus Rosmarinus. In the heath family Ericaceae, it inhabits subalpine and montane gullies, cliffs, plateaux, valley floors and ridges, and reaches a height of 0.3–1 m (1.0–3.3 ft). A 2017 assessment using the New Zealand Threat Classification System classified it as "Not Threatened," giving it an estimated population of over 100,000.
