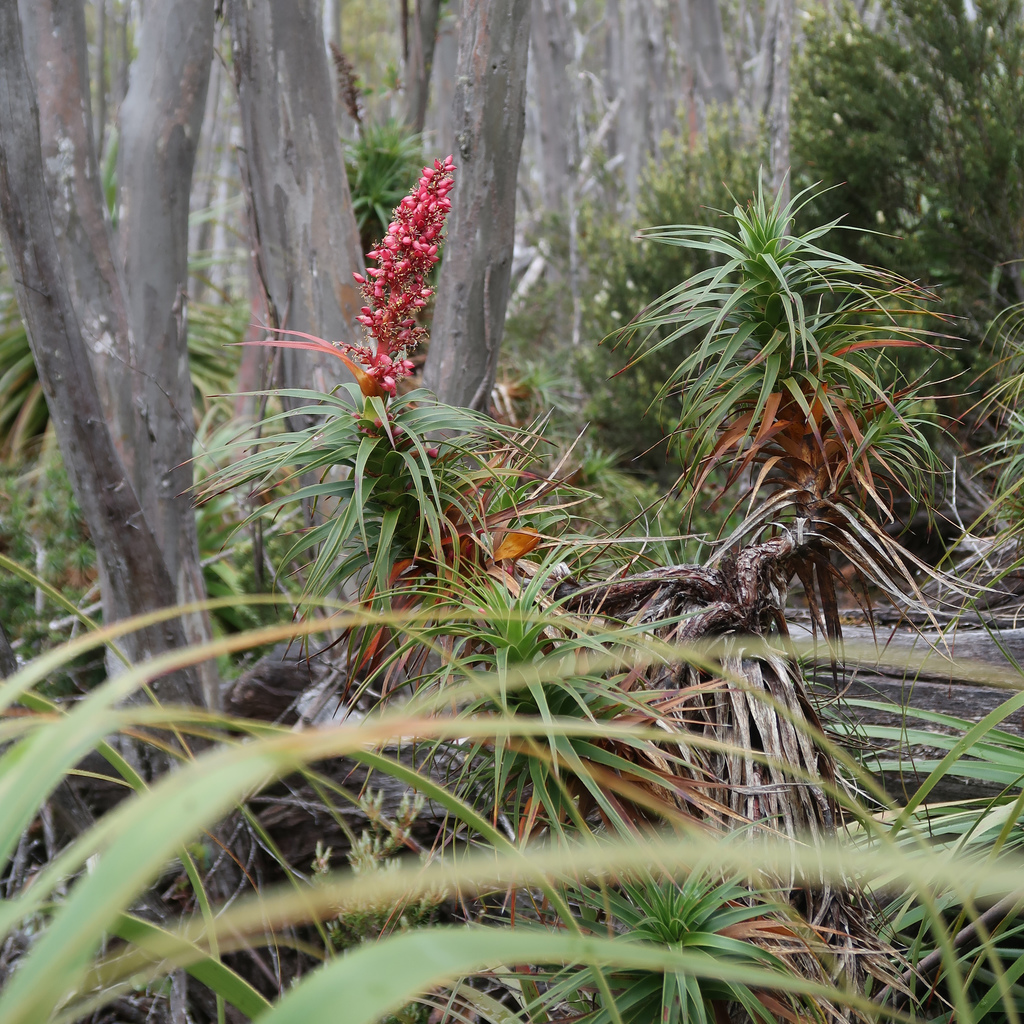
- Richea × curtisiae at Cradle Mountain-Lake St Clair National Park, Tasmania

Scientific classification
- Kingdom: Plantae
- Clade: Tracheophytes
- Clade: Angiosperms
- Clade: Eudicots
- Clade: Asterids
- Order: Ericales
- Family: Ericaceae
- Genus: Richea
- Species: R. × curtisiae

Binomial name
- Richea × curtisiae A.M.Gray
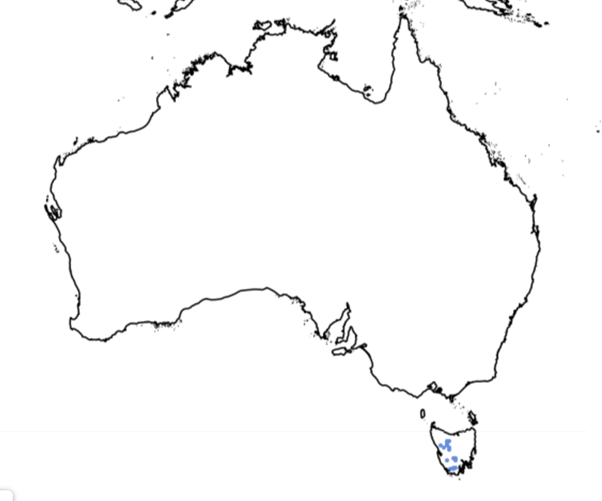

= Richea × curtisiae =

Species of flowering plants

Richea × curtisiae, commonly known as Curtis's candle heath, is a hybrid species of plant endemic to Tasmania. It belongs to the genus Richea, which forms part of the Ericaceae (formerly Epacridaceae) family, commonly known as the heath family.

Richea × curtisiae is a hybrid species between Richea scoparia and Richea pandanifolia.

== Description ==
Richea × curtisiae has the form of an intermediate between the smaller shrub Richea scoparia and the larger erect shrub/tree Richea pandanifolia. As such, Richea × curtisiae forms a small shrub of between 30 and 150 cm (12 and 59 in) tall with an erect habit. Richea × curtisiae has few branches, with persistent leaves. These leaves are tapering and strap-like, which vary in length from 10 to 25 cm (4 to 10 in). The leaf margins are cartilaginous and are finely serrated and cutting, and the branch tips contains a dense rosette of leaves. As the leaves age they become brown, and the leaves on the lower two-thirds of the stem are dead and decaying.

The inflorescence of Richea × curtisiae occurs as a terminal panicle, a branched inflorescence, which are between 10 and 20 cm (4 and 8 in) long. The peduncles, the stalks of the flowers, are 5 to 10 in number, and are short, between 2 and 4 mm (1/16 and 3/16 in). The flowers are pink to orange in colour.

Richea × custisiae has an appearance similar to that of Richea alpina, but it is shorter, unbranched, and broadly spreading, and is restricted to alpine areas in the deep south-west.

== Habitat and distribution ==
Richea × custisiae is endemic to Tasmania and is relatively common in occurrence where both Richea scoparia and Richea pandanifolia occur, with heightened occurrence after a disturbance, like that of fire or clearing.

Richea × curtisiae occurs in alpine areas of the West and Central mountains of Tasmania. It can be found in sub-alpine woodlands, and sub-alpine heath communities. Richea × curtisiae also often occurs with Dracophyllum milliganii.

== Taxonomy ==
Richea × curtisiae was first recognised in 1971 by Alan Maurice Gray, and was named after Winifred Curtis, a matriarch in Tasmanian botany.
