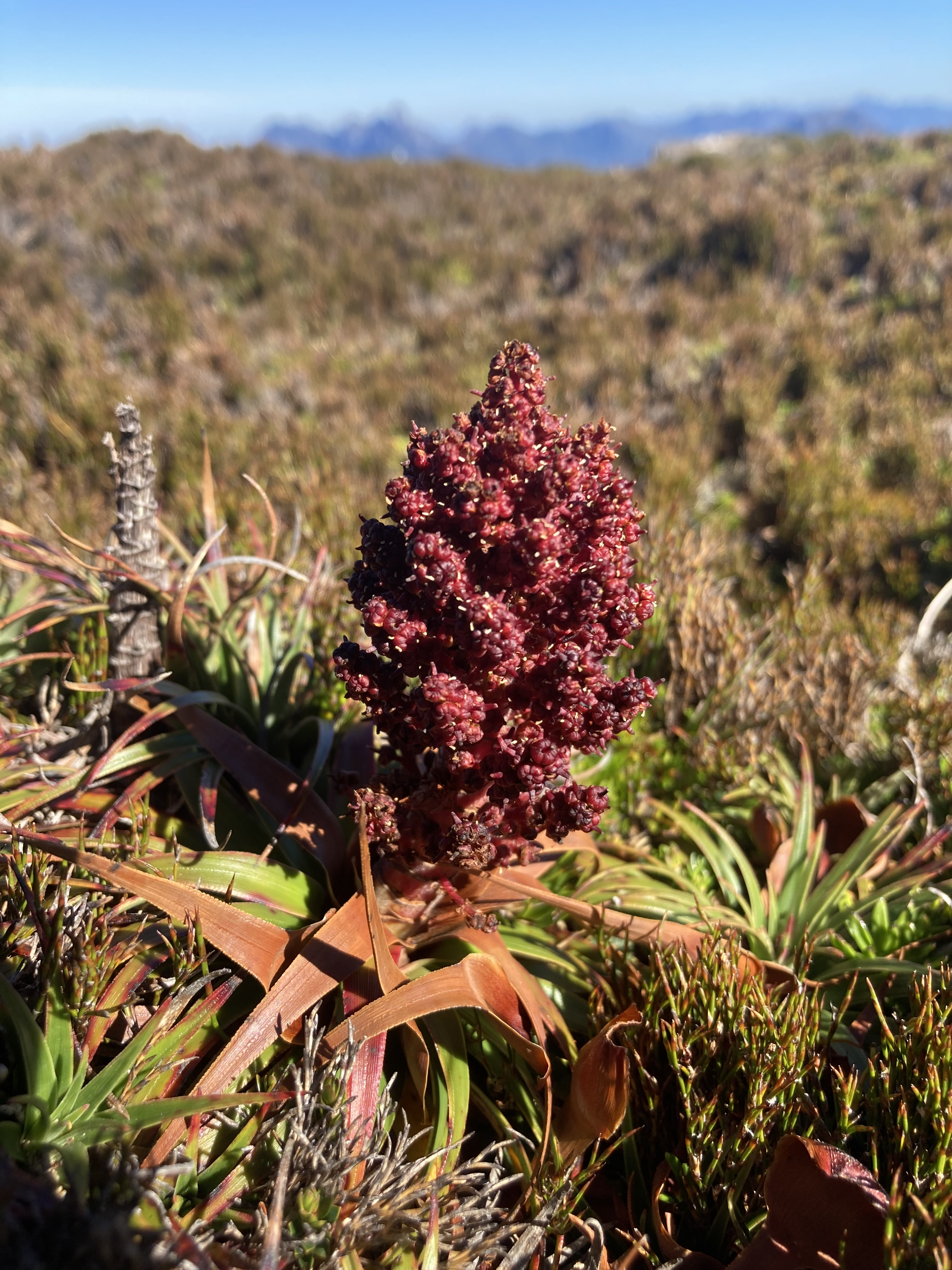
- Richea alpina on the Mt Bobs summit plateau

Scientific classification
- Kingdom: Plantae
- Clade: Tracheophytes
- Clade: Angiosperms
- Clade: Eudicots
- Clade: Asterids
- Order: Ericales
- Family: Ericaceae
- Genus: Richea
- Species: R. alpina

Binomial name
- Richea alpina Menadue

Synonyms
- Dracophyllum alpinum (Menadue) S.Venter.

= Richea alpina =

Species of flowering plants

Richea alpina, known as short candleheath, is a species of heath endemic to Tasmania, occurring in the mountains of the southwest. It is morphologically similar to the hybrid species Richea curtisiae which usually occurs after disturbance in the west and central mountains.

== Description ==
Richea alpina is a low growing (< 1 m (3 ft 3 in) high), sparsely branching shrub. The branches are usually covered by soil, making the above ground parts appear separate. The spreading leaves curve downwards and are crowded towards the ends of branches. They are generally 80–130 mm (3–5 in) long, 6–12 mm (0.2–0.5 in) wide with serrated margins and lance-shaped, tapering to a point at the end.

The inflorescence consists of numerous flowers in terminal, pyramidal panicles (many-branched inflorescences). The floral branches bear 5-18 flowers with leaf-like bracts. While similar to the foliage leaves, the lower bracts are smaller, more erect, and with membranous wings. The shorter upper bracts suddenly taper to an erect, acute point and are easily detached and shed early. The flowers are on pedicels 2–4 mm (0.08–0.16 in) long, with 1–3 mm (0.04–0.12 in) long broadly triangular sepals that are the same colour as the corolla, which can be pink, orange, or crimson. Each flower has 5 stamens which are red with 3–4.5 mm (0.12–0.18 in) long filaments attached slightly below the centre of 1–1.5 mm (0.04–0.06 in) long anthers. Flowering occurs from November to late January, ultimately producing capsules 2.5–3.5 mm (0.10–0.14 in) in diameter.

== Habitat and distribution ==
Like most of the species in the genus Richea, R. alpina is endemic to Tasmania, and can be found in the mountains of the southwest, including the Frankland, Wilmot, Western and Eastern Arthur Ranges, and Mt Bobs. As the name suggests, it occurs in exposed alpine moor and low shrubbery, often as solitary plants or forming low copses surrounded by Empodisma minus. It can also sometimes be found in subalpine shrubbery where it can grow taller (70–100 cm (28–39 in) high) due to being more protected. It occupies undisturbed sites, often isolated from Richea scoparia and/or Richea pandanifolia.

== Taxonomy ==
Menadue and Crowden (2000) first formally described R. alpina after examining flavonoid patterns in a taxonomic revision of the genus Richea. While morphologically similar to the hybrid species R. curitsiae (R. scoparia x R. pandanifolia), flavonoid chemistry showed R. alpina had quite a different flavonoid pattern to R. scoparia and R. pandanifolia, unlike R. curtisiae which had the complement of both these species.

As well as the clear differentiation in flavonoid patterns, R. curtisiae populations are small and ephemeral, showing continual establishment after disturbances such as fire, while the habitat of R. alpina is undisturbed, and populations are well established. R. curtisiae populations also always occur in the vicinity of its parental species, whereas R. alpina usually occurs in the absence of one or both of these species.
