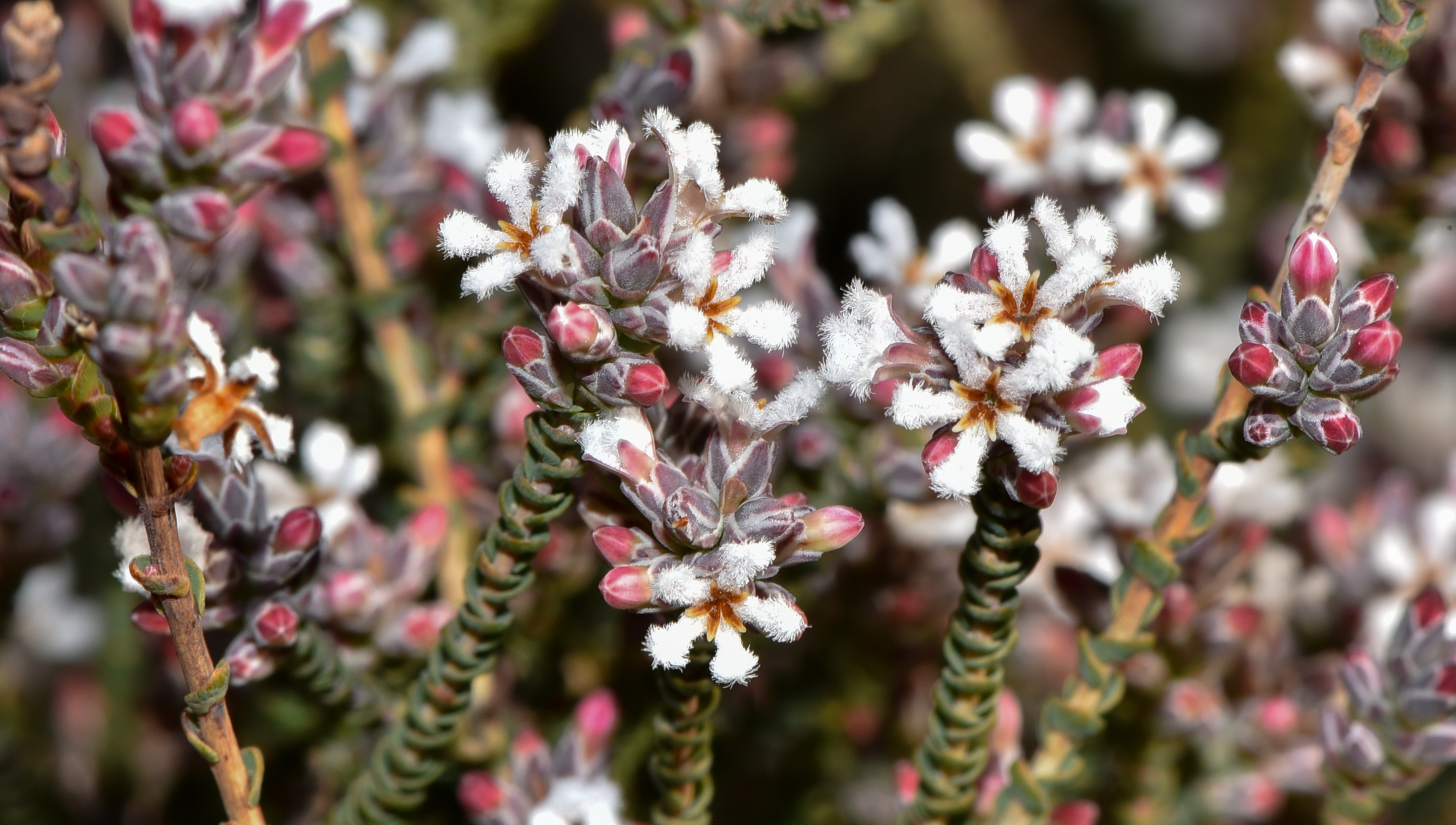

Scientific classification
- Kingdom: Plantae
- Clade: Tracheophytes
- Clade: Angiosperms
- Clade: Eudicots
- Clade: Asterids
- Order: Ericales
- Family: Ericaceae
- Genus: Leucopogon
- Species: L. sprengelioides

Binomial name
- Leucopogon sprengelioides Sond.
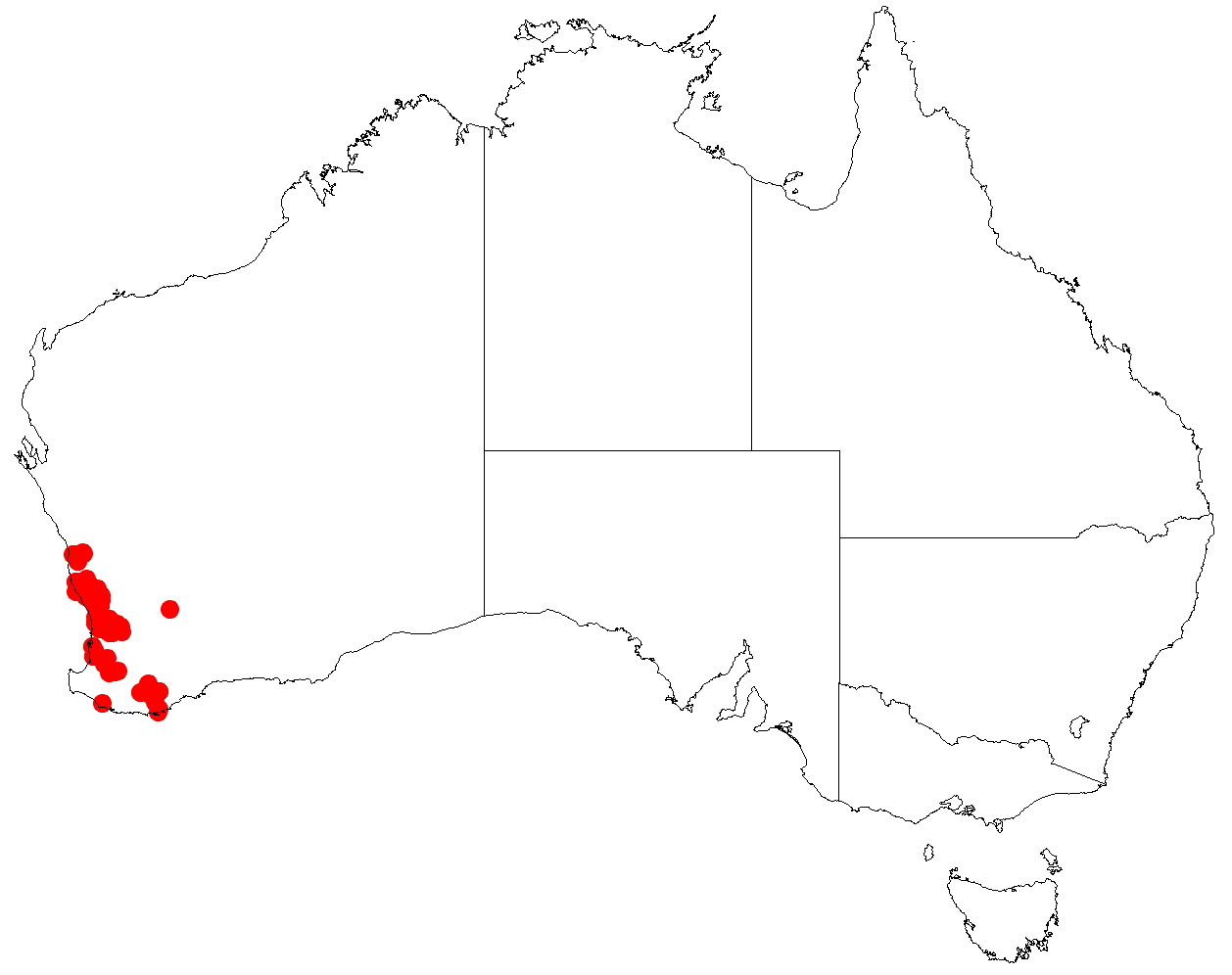
- Occurrence data from AVH

Synonyms
- Styphelia sprengelioides (Sond.) F.Muell.; Styphelia brachycephala auct. non (DC.) F.Muell.: Mueller, F.J.H. von (1867)

= Leucopogon sprengelioides =

Species of shrub

Leucopogon sprengelioides is a species of flowering plant in the family Ericaceae, and is endemic to the south-west of Western Australia. It is an erect shrub with stem-clasping, egg-shaped or lance-shaped leaves and short, dense spikes of white, tube-shaped flowers.

== Description ==
Leucopogon sprengelioides is an erect shrub that typically grows to a height of 20–80 cm (7.9–31.5 in) and has slender, mostly glabrous branches. Its leaves are erect, sessile, egg-shaped to lance-shaped, stem-clasping and concave, 2–4 mm (0.079–0.157 in) long and often crowded along the stems. The flowers are borne on the ends of branches or in upper leaf axils in short, dense spikes. At the base of the flowers there are small, leaf-like bracts, and rounded bracteoles about half as long as the sepals. The sepals are about 2 mm (0.079 in) long, the petals white, about 4.5 mm (0.18 in) long and joined at the base, forming a tube, the petal lobes longer than the petal tube. Flowering occurs in March and April or from July to November.

== Taxonomy ==
Leucopogon sprengelioides was first formally described in 1845 by Otto Wilhelm Sonder in Lehmann's Plantae Preissianae from specimens collected near York by James Drummond. The specific epithet, (sprengelioides) means "Sprengelia"-like.

== Distribution and habitat ==
This leucopogon grows on granite outcrops, lateritic ridges, breakaways and on coastal limestone in the Geraldton Sandplains, Jarrah Forest and Swan Coastal Plain bioregions of south-western Western Australia.
