= Sprengelia montana =

Scientific classification
- Kingdom: Plantae
- Clade: Tracheophytes
- Clade: Angiosperms
- Clade: Eudicots
- Clade: Asterids
- Order: Ericales
- Family: Ericaceae
- Genus: Sprengelia
- Species: S. montana

Binomial name
- Sprengelia montana R.Br.

Synonyms
- Sprengelia incarnata f. montana (R.Br.) Siebert & `Voss; Sprengelia incarnata var. montana (R.Br.) Domin

Species of plant

Sprengelia montana is a species of flowering plant of the family Ericaceae, and is endemic to Tasmania. It is a small, erect shrub with overlapping, stem-clasping, egg-shaped leaves, and pink flowers, sometimes in groups of up to 10 on the ends of branches.

== Description ==
Sprengelia montana is a shrub that typically grows to a height of up to 30 cm (12 in), often in or around alpine cushion plants. The leaves overlap each other, have a stem-clasping base, and are thick, egg-shaped, 3–8 mm (0.12–0.31 in) long and 2–3 mm (0.079–0.118 in) wide. The flowers are arranged singly, in pairs or groups of up to 10 in crowded heads on the ends of branches, with egg-shaped bracts at the base. The sepals are narrowly lance-shaped, 4.5–5.1 mm (0.18–0.20 in) long and the petals are pink, joined at the base to form a tube 0.9–1.2 mm (0.035–0.047 in) long with lance-shaped lobes 3.5–4.4 mm (0.14–0.17 in) long. Flowering occurs from November to January. This species is similar to Sprengelia incarnata, but has spreading anthers, unlike those of S. incarnata.

== Taxonomy ==
Sprengelia montana was first formally described in 1810 by Robert Brown in Prodromus Florae Novae Hollandiae et Insulae Van Diemen. The specific epithet (montana) means "pertaining to a mountain".

== Habitat and distribution ==
This sprengelia is moderately common in alpine and subalpine areas of Tasmania, including on Ben Lomond, the Central Highlands and the Southern Ranges, where it grows in moist areas, often with or near cushion plants.
