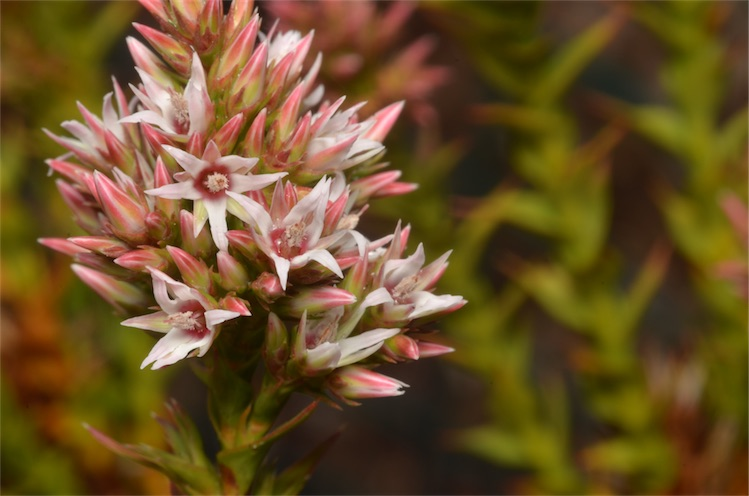
- In The Tasmanian Arboretum

Scientific classification
- Kingdom: Plantae
- Clade: Tracheophytes
- Clade: Angiosperms
- Clade: Eudicots
- Clade: Asterids
- Order: Ericales
- Family: Ericaceae
- Genus: Sprengelia
- Species: S. propinqua

Binomial name
- Sprengelia propinqua A.Cunn. ex DC.

Synonyms
- Sprengelia incarnata f. propinqua (A.Cunn. ex DC.) Siebert & Voss; Sprengelia macrantha Hook.f.; Sprengelia propinqua var. demissa F.Muell.

= Sprengelia propinqua =

Species of plant

Sprengelia propinqua is a species of flowering plant of the family Ericaceae, and is endemic to Tasmania. It is an erect, robust shrub with overlapping, stem-clasping, egg-shaped leaves, and white flowers crowded in upper leaf axils.

== Description ==
Sprengelia propinqua is a shrub that typically grows to a height of up to 2 m (6 ft 7 in). Its leaves overlap each other, have a stem-clasping base, and are egg-shaped, 6–20 mm (0.24–0.79 in) long and 3–6 mm (0.12–0.24 in) wide, crowded near the ends of branches. The flowers are crowded near the ends of branches, with egg-shaped bracts 3.5–5.0 mm (0.14–0.20 in) long and 3.0–4.5 mm (0.12–0.18 in) wide at the base. The sepals are narrowly lance-shaped, 7.6–8.4 mm (0.30–0.33 in) long and the petals are white, joined at the base to form a tube 1.4–2.0 mm (0.055–0.079 in) long with narrowly lance-shaped lobes 6.2–7.9 mm (0.24–0.31 in) long. Flowering occurs from November to January.

== Taxonomy ==
Sprengelia propinqua was first formally described in 1839 by Augustin Pyramus de Candolle in his Prodromus Systematis Naturalis Regni Vegetabilis from an unpublished description by Allan Cunningham of plants he collected near Hobart. The specific epithet (propinqua) means "resembling".

== Habitat and distribution ==
This sprengelia grows in heath and sedge communities in high rainfall areas from sea level to altitudes above 1,000 m (3,300 ft) in Tasmania, including on the Southern and Central Highlands. It often co-exists with Sprengelia incarnata, and sometimes hybridises with it.
