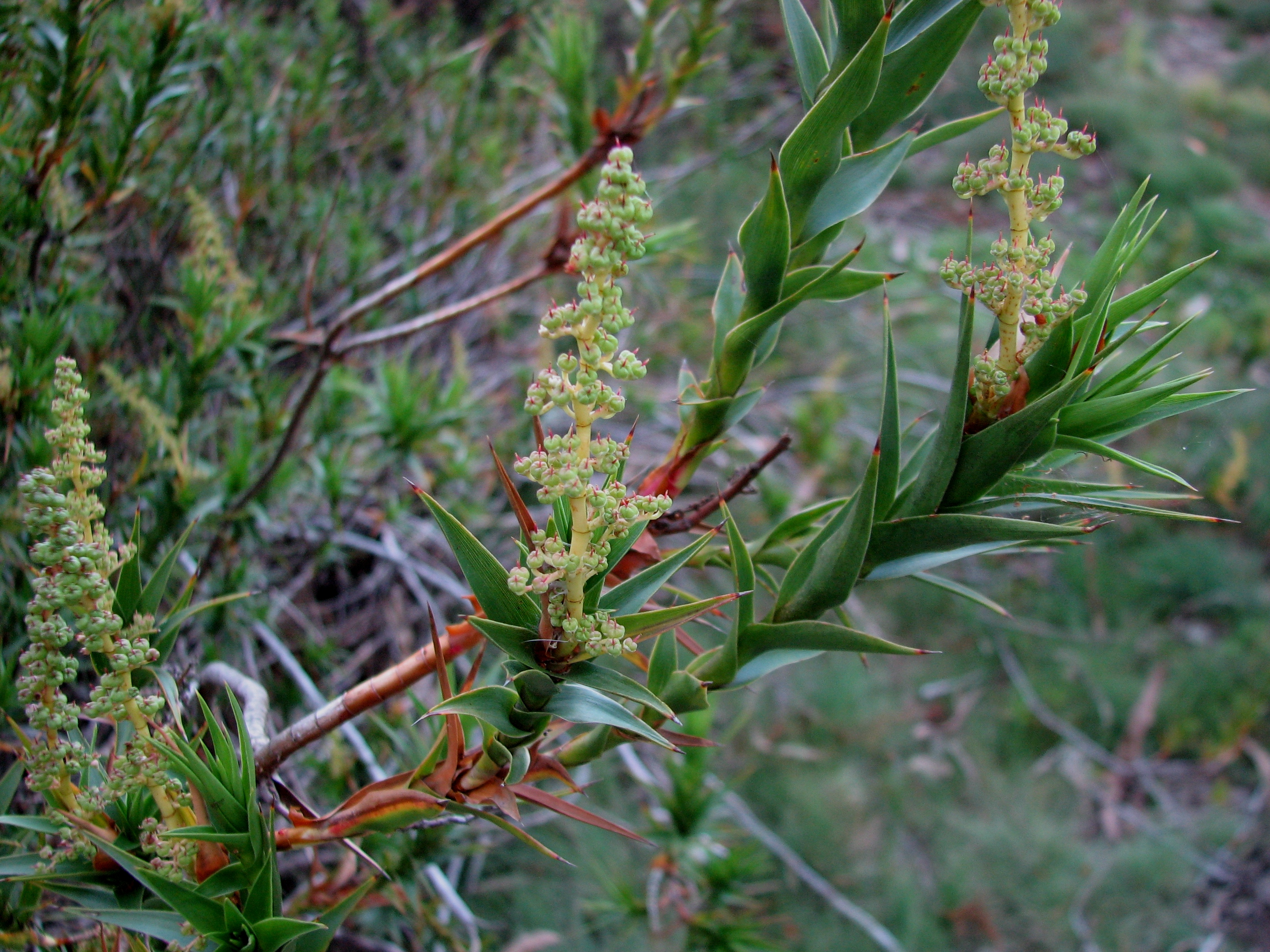

Scientific classification
- Kingdom: Plantae
- Clade: Tracheophytes
- Clade: Angiosperms
- Clade: Eudicots
- Clade: Asterids
- Order: Ericales
- Family: Ericaceae
- Genus: Richea
- Species: R. victoriana

Binomial name
- Richea victoriana Menadue

= Richea victoriana =

Species of flowering plant

Richea victoriana is a species of flowering plant in the family Ericaceae that is endemic to Victoria, Australia. It is similar to Richea continentis, with differences including the presence of prominent leaf scars on the stems and inflorescences that are less than 12 cm long and have a hairless stem. The species was first formally described in 1995 in Muelleria based on plant material collected from the Thomson River headwaters. It occurs in wet areas in the vicinity of the Baw Baw plateau and the Blue Range.
