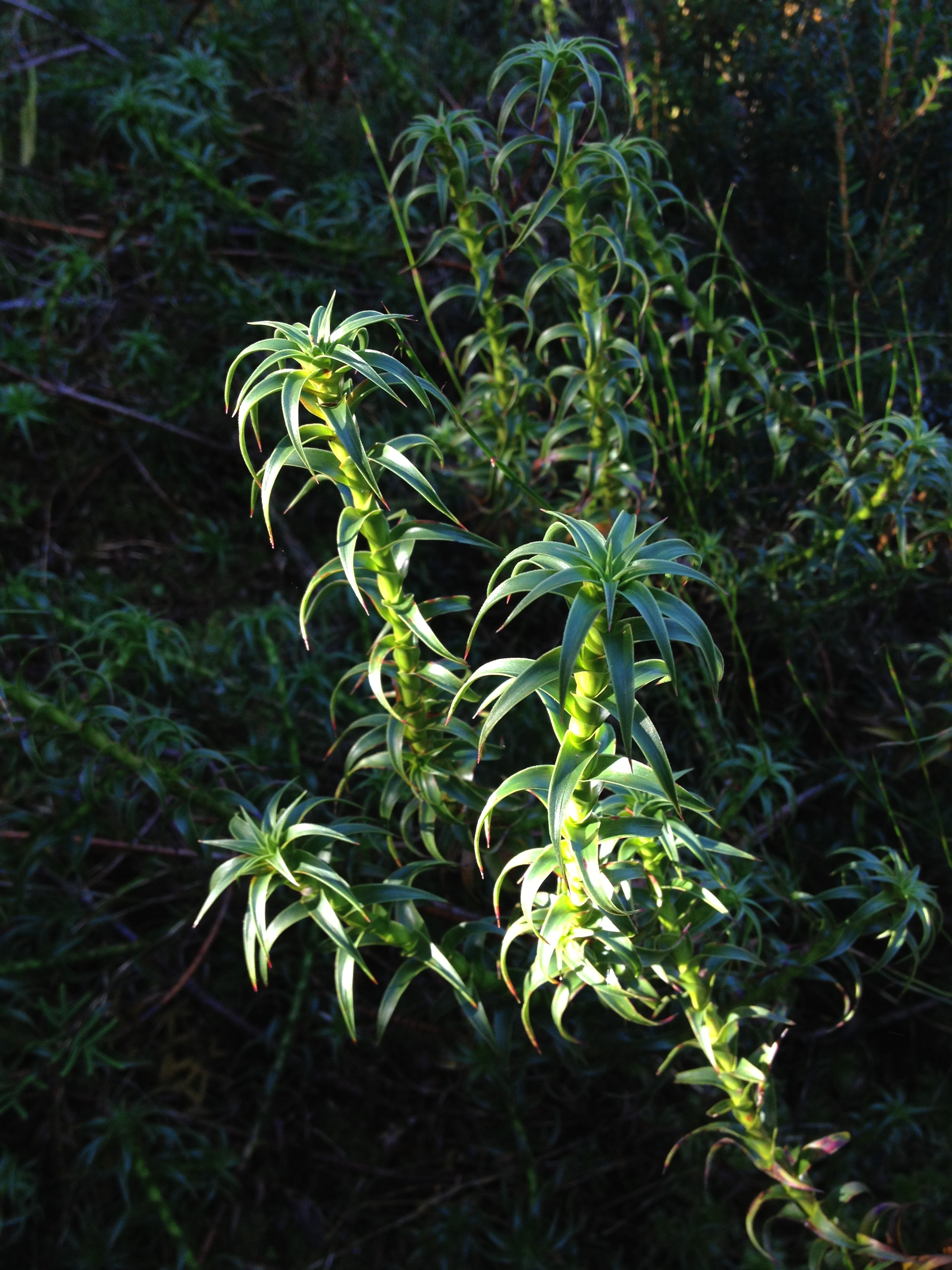

Scientific classification
- Kingdom: Plantae
- Clade: Tracheophytes
- Clade: Angiosperms
- Clade: Eudicots
- Clade: Asterids
- Order: Ericales
- Family: Ericaceae
- Genus: Richea
- Species: R. gunnii

Binomial name
- Richea gunnii Hook.f.

= Richea gunnii =

Species of flowering plant

Richea gunnii, the bog candleheath or Gunns richea, is an endemic Tasmanian angiosperm. It is a dicot of the family Ericaceae and is found in Central, Western and North-east Tasmania.

== Description ==
Richea gunnii is a common montane shrub that grows in boggy areas. It is an erect shrub, 30–100 cm high. The branches are divaricate. Mature stems become bare of leaves and show prominent annular scars. The leaves are generally clustered in the top 5–20 cm of the branches. The leaves are spreading, rigid and usually recurved. They are 30–60 mm long × 5–7 mm wide and taper to an acute apex. R. gunnii flowers in summer, late December to February. The flowers are white. The inflorescence are 30–100mm × 10–15 mm, they are terminal and erect on a spike-like panicle, maturing acropetally. The internodes are 3–5 mm long, becoming shorter towards the apex. The petals are fused to form a cap which is shed to expose the stamens.

== Taxonomy ==
The genus Richea was named by Robert Brown in Prodromus Florae Novae Hollandiae, 555 (1810) after Claude Antoine Gaspar Riche (1762–1797) who was a doctor and botanist on the French frigate Espérence, one of two frigates from the 1792 Bruni d’Entrecastreaux expedition. The species R. gunnii was named after Tasmanian plant collector Ronald Campbell Gunn who collected specimens from Mount Wellington and Western Mountains in 1837.

== Distribution and habitat ==
Richea gunnii occurs in Tasmania, mainly on the Central Plateau and Mt Field. It also occurs on mountains in North-east Tasmania. It is a wide spread species in wetter sub alpine areas and along water courses.

== Diversity and endemism ==
Richea is an Australian endemic genus with nine species restricted to Tasmania including Richea gunnii. There are two Richea species occurring on mainland south-eastern Australia.

The high endemism of Richea in Tasmania indicates a long historical presence and this could indicate that Tasmania with its cooler climate has become a refuge for Richea which is a relict from the breakup of Gondwana.
