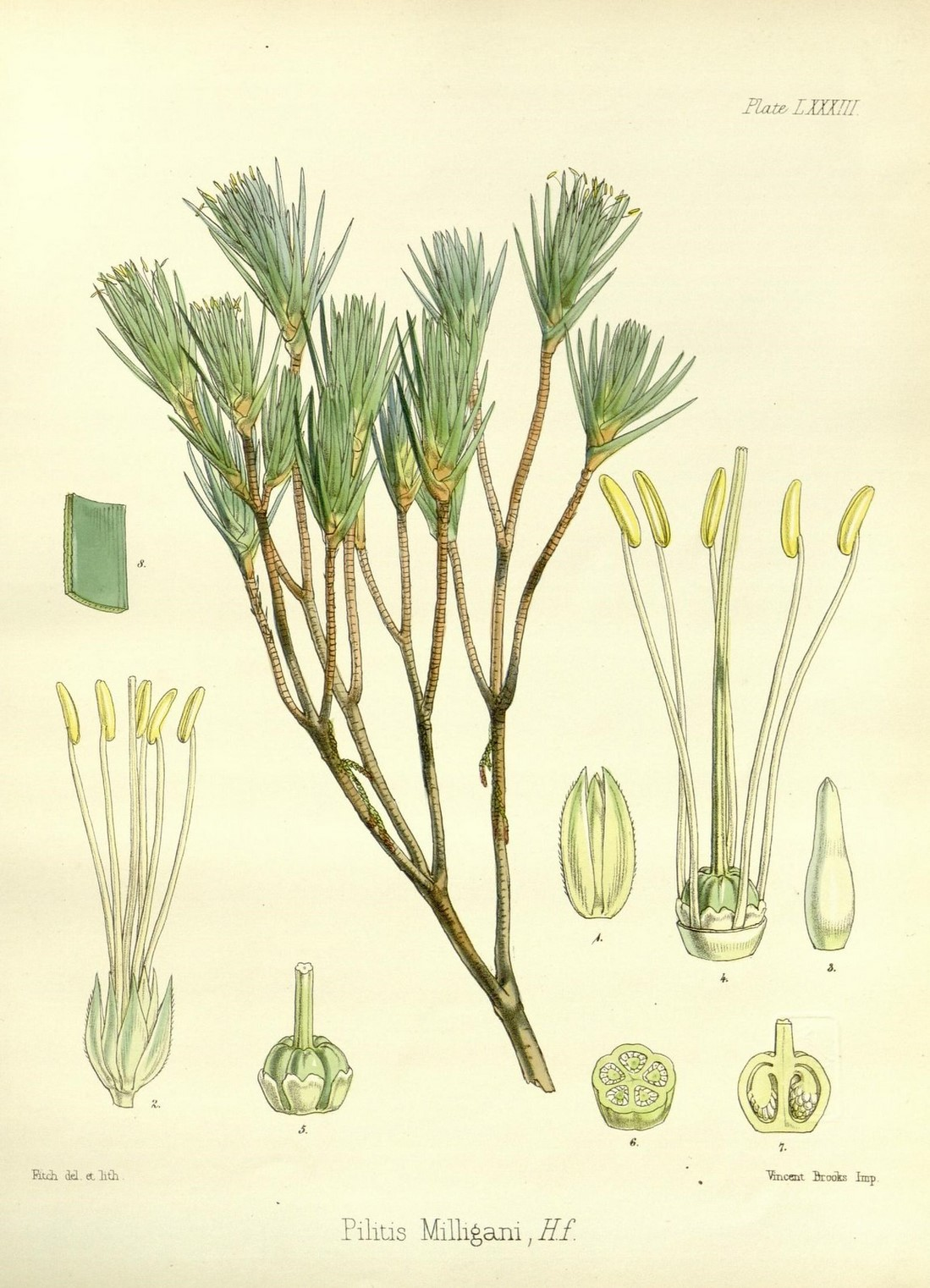

Scientific classification
- Kingdom: Plantae
- Clade: Tracheophytes
- Clade: Angiosperms
- Clade: Eudicots
- Clade: Asterids
- Order: Ericales
- Family: Ericaceae
- Genus: Richea
- Species: R. milliganii

Binomial name
- Richea milliganii (Hook.f.) F.Muell.
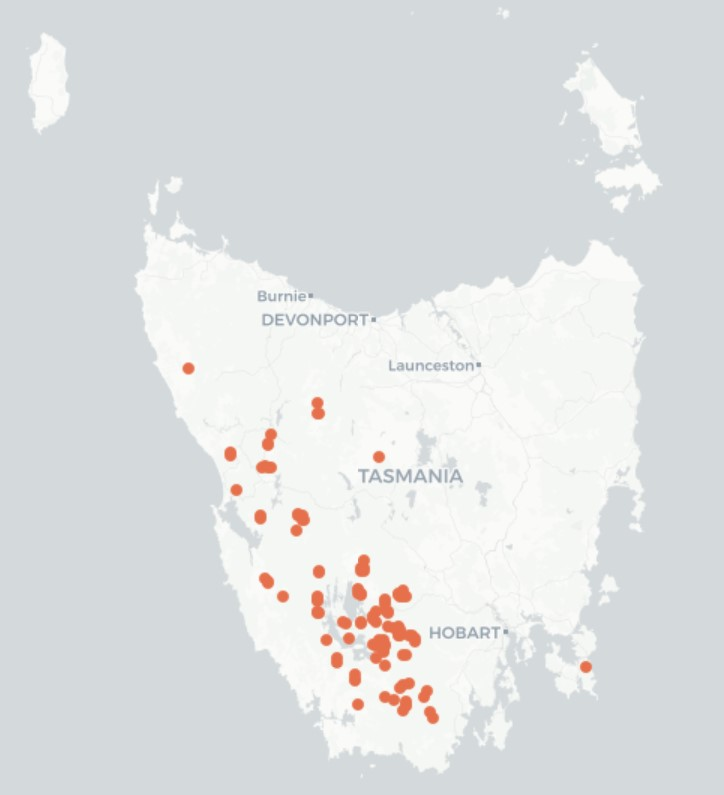
- Distribution map of Richea milliganii in Tasmania

= Richea milliganii =

Tasmanian plant

Richea milliganii, commonly known as the nodding candle heath or Milligan's candle heath, is a common species of flowering plant in the family Ericaceae. It is endemic to Tasmania. Compared to other Richea species, R. milliganii can be identified by its distinctive pale-yellow drooping flower heads, hence the common name.

== Description ==
Richea milliganii is an erect shrub of 1.5–2.3 m (4 ft 11 in – 7 ft 7 in) in height with straight, spreading, somewhat soft leaves. Its leaves are lanceolate in shape and can reach up to 5 cm (2.0 in) in length. Its inflorescences consist of 8-15 pale yellow flowers in distinctive drooping terminal heads, and each flower has five stamens.

== Habitat and distribution ==
Richea milliganii is a common shrub found across western and southern Tasmania from lower altitudes up to mountainous subalpine areas of c. 1,000 m (3,300 ft). It may be found as far north as Mount Read. It favours peaty, low-nutrient soils in montane areas or open heathland. At lower altitudes, it is primarily found in woodlands or at the margins of buttongrass plains.

== Taxonomy ==
Joseph Dalton Hooker was the first European to describe this plant in his publication, The Botany of the Antarctic Voyage of H.M. Discovery Ships Erebus and Terror, which was first published in 1844. In this publication, Hooke named the species Pilitis milliganii. The species was moved to the genus Cystanthe by Ferdinand von Mueller in 1858, who then reclassified it again in 1867, this time as R. milliganii.

== Diversity and endemism ==
This species is one of the nine Tasmanian endemic species belonging to the genus Richea, with the remaining two species in the genus being endemic to south-eastern mainland Australia.

There are two main theories as to why this genus is not found far outside of Tasmania. The first is that these species are paleoendemic, originating from the supercontinent Gondwana, and are relics of speciation that occurred before Gondwana's fragmentation. This supports the idea that favourable conditions for these species have persisted in Tasmania to a greater extent than on mainland Australia. The second theory is that these species diverged after the breakup of Gondwana and then underwent speciation, mostly adapting towards Tasmanian environments, while a minority of species dispersed to or continued to survive in mainland Australian habitats.

== Threats and conservation ==
While much of R. milliganii's habitat is protected in Tasmania, this habitat is primarily alpine heathland, which may experience significant environmental changes in coming years. These change could include temperature changes and wildfires, which can result in landscape disturbance and the potential loss of some species.

Alpine heathlands contain some of the highest rates of endemism in Tasmania, with the genus Richea being a good example of this. Changes in these habitats may have significant impacts on local endemics such as R. milliganii, and as such should be monitored closely.
