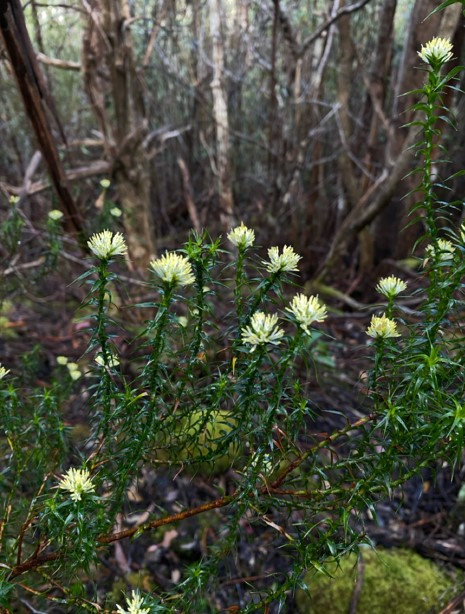
- At kunanyi / Mount Wellington

Scientific classification
- Kingdom: Plantae
- Clade: Tracheophytes
- Clade: Angiosperms
- Clade: Eudicots
- Clade: Asterids
- Order: Ericales
- Family: Ericaceae
- Genus: Richea
- Species: R. procera

Binomial name
- Richea procera (F.Muell.) F.Muell.
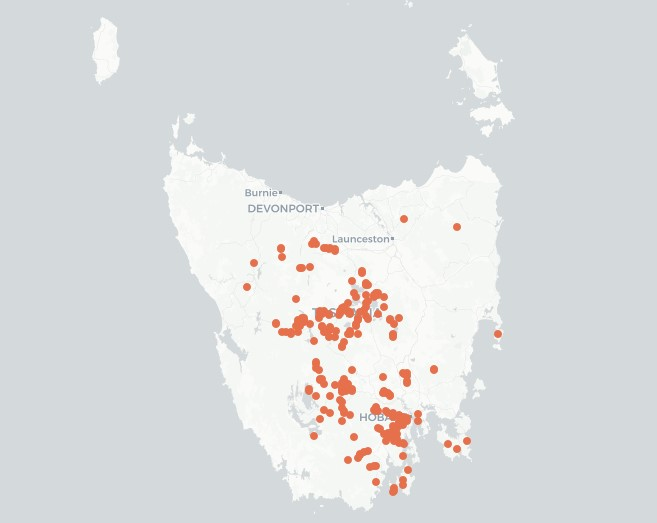
- Atlas of Living Australia Distribution Map for Richea procera

= Richea procera =

Species of plant

Richea procera, commonly known as the lowland richea or lax candleheath is an erect, sparsely branched shrub endemic to Tasmania.

This species is sometimes confused with Richea sprengelioides, however it can be distinguished by its larger, more flexible leaves and differences in flowering morphology.

== Description ==
Richea procera is a sparsely branched shrub growing between 60–300 cm tall, with bare mature stems marked by annular leaf scars.

Leaves are arranged along the branches spreading outward in a recurved shape. They are ovate-lanceolate, gradually tapering from a broader base to a pointed tip. The leaf apex is acute and slightly pungent but not rigid like that of R. sprengeliodes. They can measure anywhere between 8–25 mm in length and 4–9 mm in width. Leaves exhibit parallel venation which is characteristic of the genus Richea. Older leaves have a flattened ridge near the apex on the abaxial surface.

Inflorescence are 2–3 cm long and up to 2 cm wide forming erect clusters in terminal heads on the main and lateral branches. Flower clusters mature from the base towards the tip. Each cluster contains 12–20 flowers, positioned in the axils of persistent, leaf-like bracts (6–9 mm long), which turn from green to brown over time.

Sepals are translucent-white with pink tips, measuring 4–6 mm long and 1.5–2.0 mm wide. The corolla, which functions like petals, is dark pink at the apex, fading to white at the base. Initially forming a conical structure that encloses the reproductive organs, the corolla later abscises, revealing a brush-like arrangement of stamens to facilitate pollen dispersal. The species has 5–6 yellow stamens, with filaments measuring 8–10 mm long and anthers 2.3–2.8 mm long.

Flowering occurs from October to early December.

== Habitat and distribution ==
Richea procera is endemic to Tasmania and primarily occurs in central and southern regions at altitudes above 400 meters, but below the subalpine zone where it thrives in cool, high-humidity environments. It is distributed across the Central Highlands, Derwent Valley, Hobart, Huon Valley, Kentish, Launceston, Meander Valley, Northern Midlands, Southern Midlands, and West Coast municipalities.

It typically grows in scrubby, wet lowland vegetation on nutrient-poor soils, particularly those derived from sandstone. It also occurs in habitats with peaty sandstones, grey sandy soils within boulder-strewn landscapes, and heathland. It is rare in low-altitude alpine heath in the eastern mountains.

In areas with high humidity and consistent moisture, Richea procera can form dense shrub layers, particularly in subalpine woodlands and wet heathlands.

== Ecology and adaptations ==
Richea procera exhibits ambophily, meaning it is pollinated by both wind and insects. It produces small, dry pollen, which are well-adapted for wind dispersal, and lacks nectaries, a trait typical of wind-pollinated species.

Despite its reliance on wind, R. procera is also visited by bees and flies, indicating that insect pollination contributes to reproductive success. This strategy aligns with other Richea species such as R. sprengelioides and R. milliganii, which share traits like yellow stamens, dry pollen, and simple inflorescences associated with bee pollination.

A key adaptation of Richea procera is its corolla abscission which reveals its brush-like arrangement of stamens. This may improve pollen exposure for wind dispersal while simultaneously making pollen more accessible to insect visitors.

== Threats and conservation ==
Richea procera is not classified as a threatened species, however like most plants may face future risks due to climate change, habitat loss and increased fire disturbance.
