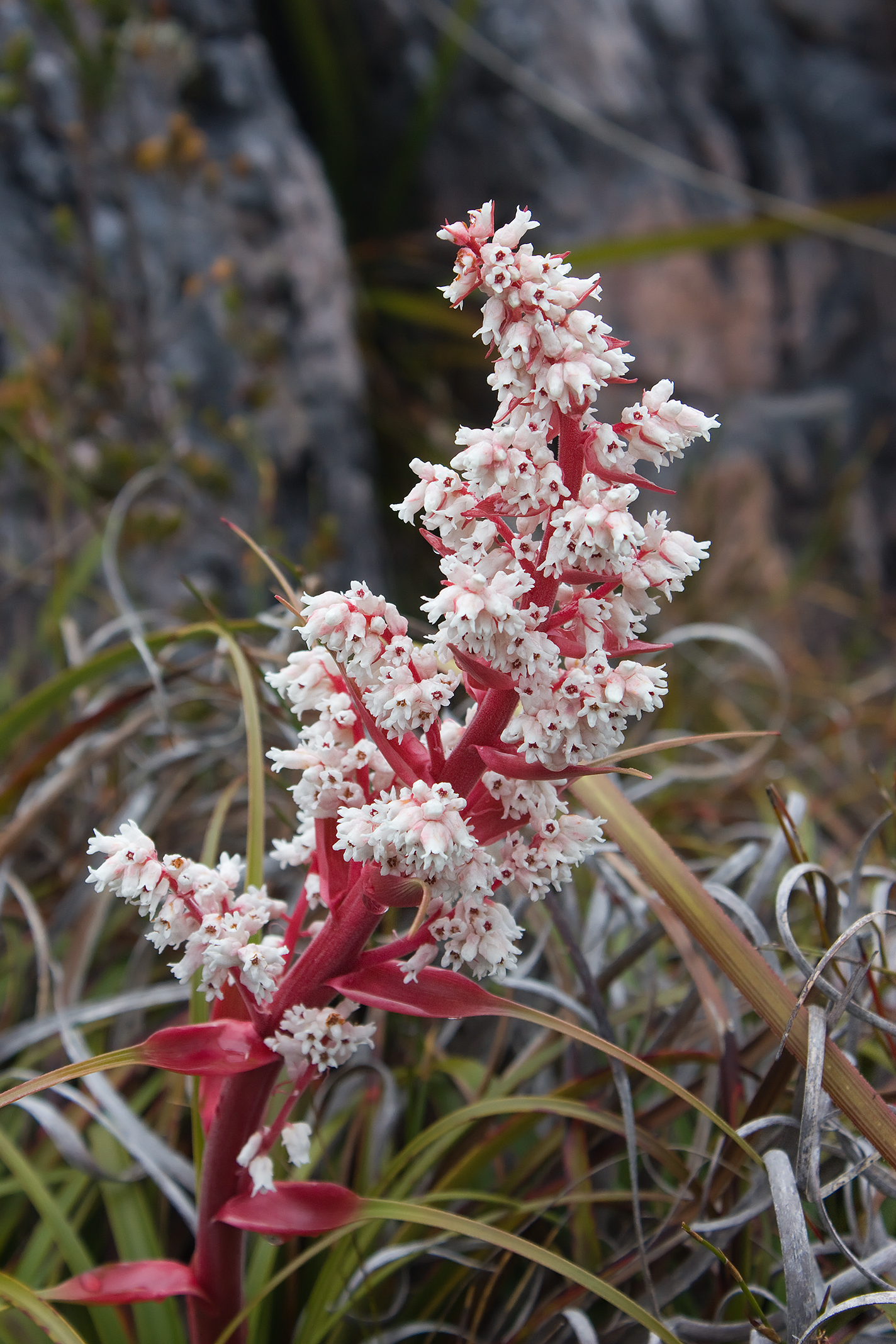
- Dracophyllum milliganii, Mount Eliza, Southwest National Park

Scientific classification
- Kingdom: Plantae
- Clade: Tracheophytes
- Clade: Angiosperms
- Clade: Eudicots
- Clade: Asterids
- Order: Ericales
- Family: Ericaceae
- Genus: Dracophyllum
- Species: D. milliganii

Binomial name
- Dracophyllum milliganii Hook.f.
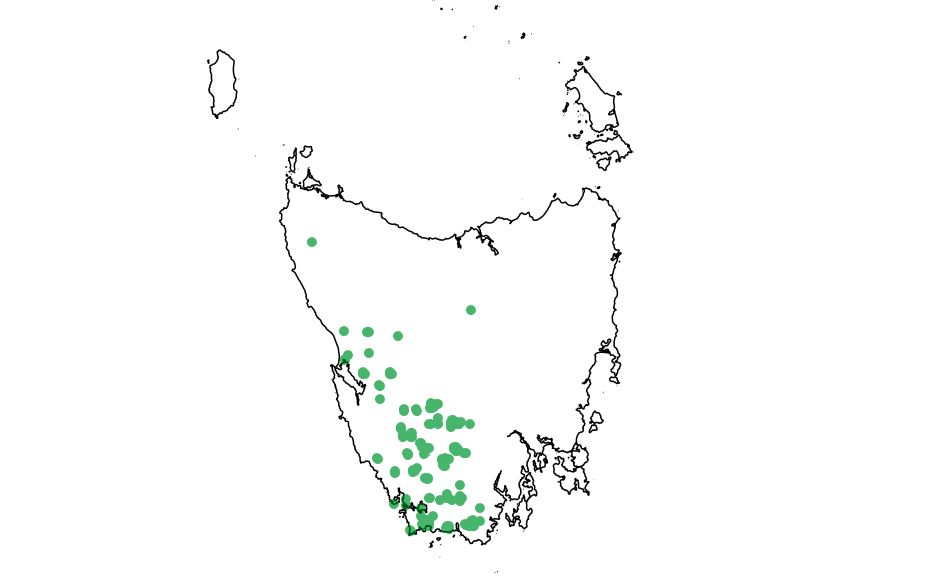
- Natural range

= Dracophyllum milliganii =

Species of flowering plant

Dracophyllum milliganii is a species of angiosperm in the family Ericaceae and the sub-family Epacridoideae. It is a distinctive alpine shrub, endemic to western Tasmania.

== Description ==
Dracophyllum milliganii is grouped into two populations with significantly different appearances and habitats. In alpine and sub-alpine heathland it forms a graminoid shrub about 5 to 20 cm high with 20 cm curling leaves. In alpine rainforests and wet sclerophyll forests, it forms a small tree or erect shrub with stems up to 4 metres and leaves 1 to 1.5 metres long, with a similar habit to Richea pandanifolia. Its leaves have serrulate margins (very finely toothed) and are dark green and grey brown when dead. The leaves are sheathing at the base and highly crowded. The inflorescence is a terminal flower spike with a thick red stem and small white to pink flowers fused into tubes. The leaves of D. milliganii are similar to Richea pandanifolia which forms a large erect tree in rainforests but has small flowers arising from the axis of the stem and highly serrate (toothed) leaf margins.

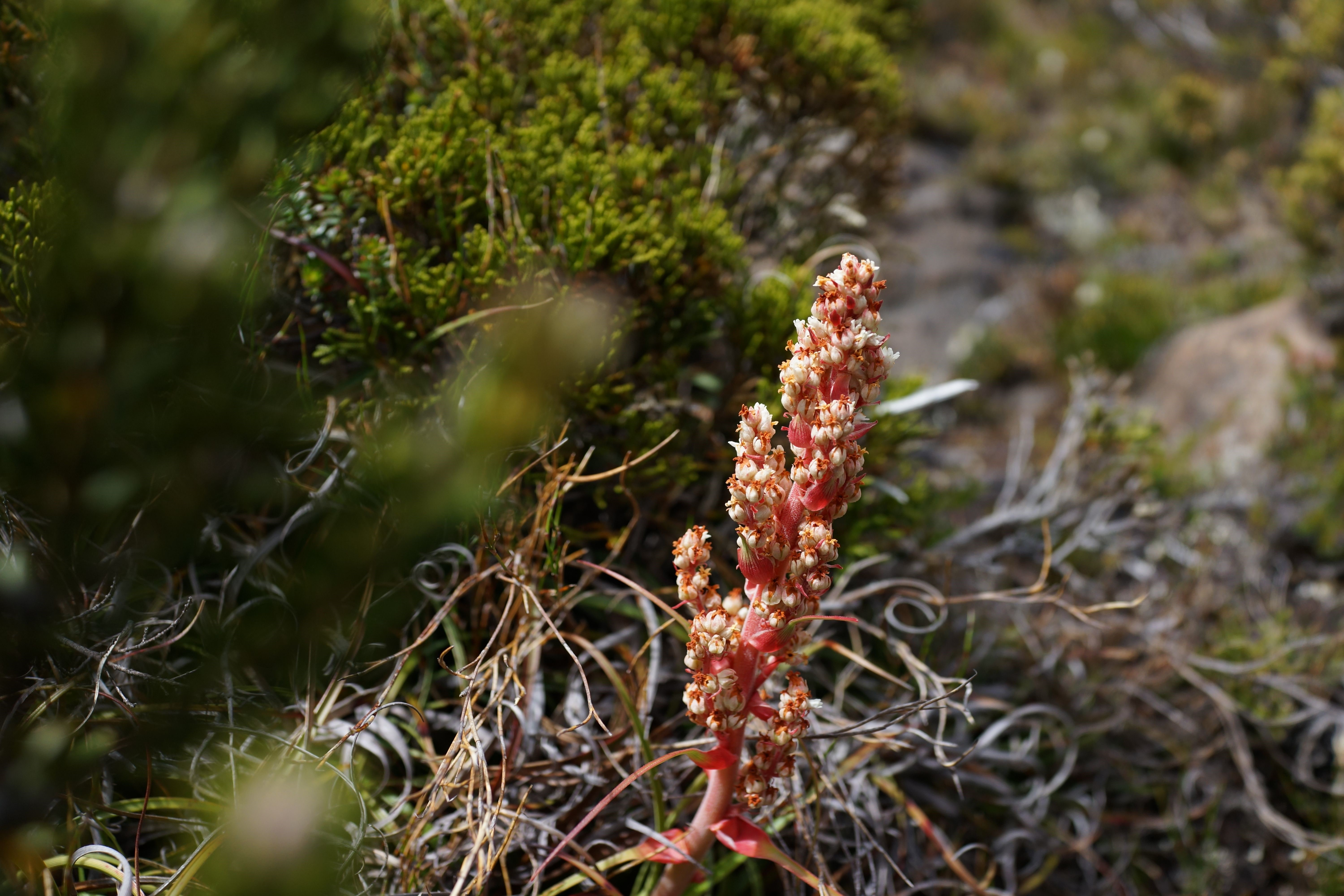
Flower spike past flowering in Mt Field National Park

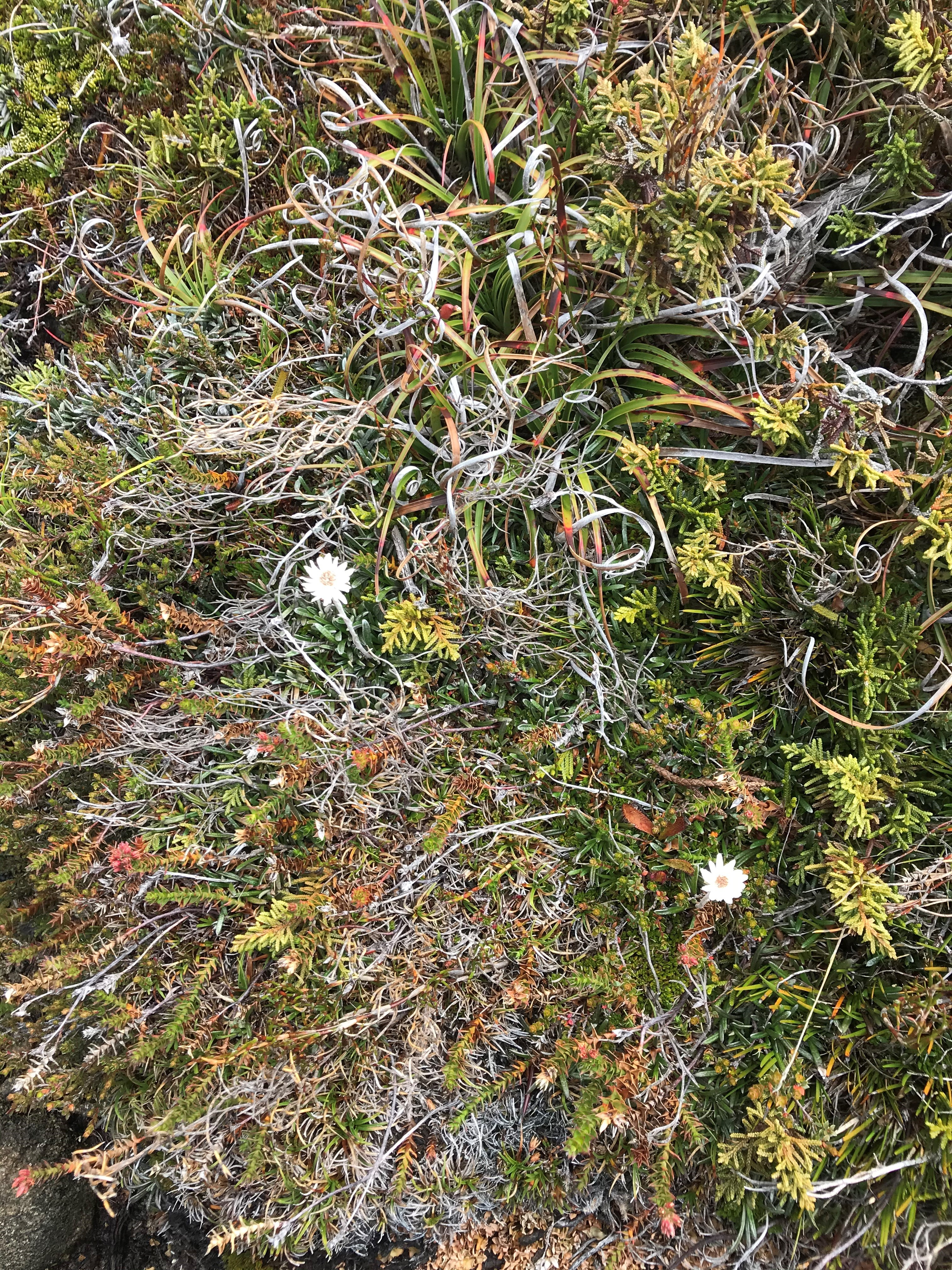
Photo showing the high floristic diversity of alpine microshrubbery. Mt Field National Park

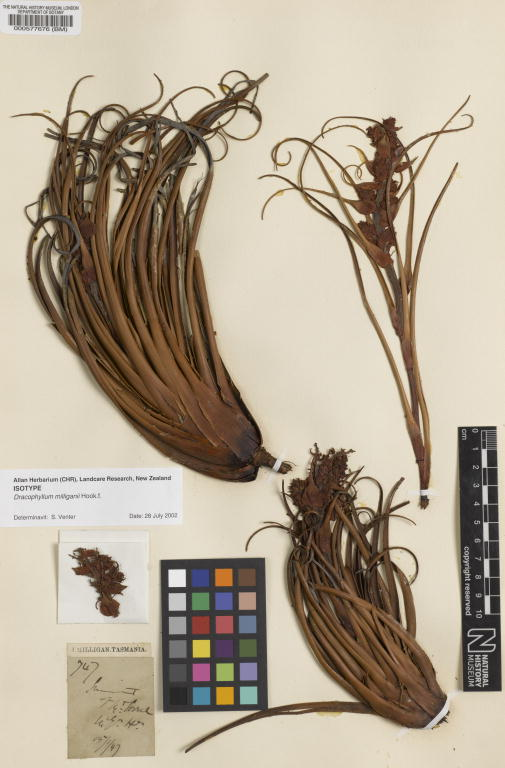
Sample collected by Joseph Dalton Hooker

== Habitat and distribution ==
D. milliganii is endemic to western and south-western Tasmania. Found in alpine areas above 850 metres altitude, but can survive lower altitudes in its rainforest form. It is found in harsh, open alpine sites on peaty or well-drained rocky soils in areas of regular snow lie. Along with Isophysis tasmanica its presence is useful in determining communities of Tasmanian highland treeless vegetation, as it appears in western alpine heathland (HHW) and cushion moorlands (HCM).

== Taxonomy ==
The first formal European description of D. milliganii was by botanist Joseph Dalton Hooker in his book Flora Tasmaniae (1860) based on plant material collected at Mount Sorrell by Joseph Milligan, a surgeon and amateur naturalist who attended an expedition to Macquarie Harbour in 1842. J.D Hooker named this and many other species after Milligan, calling him, "'one of the most indefatigable and able of Tasmanian botanists." J. D. Hooker named the genus Dracophyllum after the genus Dracaena or "dragon tree" for their superficially similar foliage.

== Phylogeny ==
Dracophyllum species are distributed around Australasia with large amounts of species in New Zealand and New Caledonia. The genus is closely related to Richea and Sphenotoma and the relationships between D. milliganii and the other genera are still unclear. There are two species of Dracophyllum in Tasmania, Dracophyllum minimum is a species of cushion plant and highly specialised for high wind areas.
