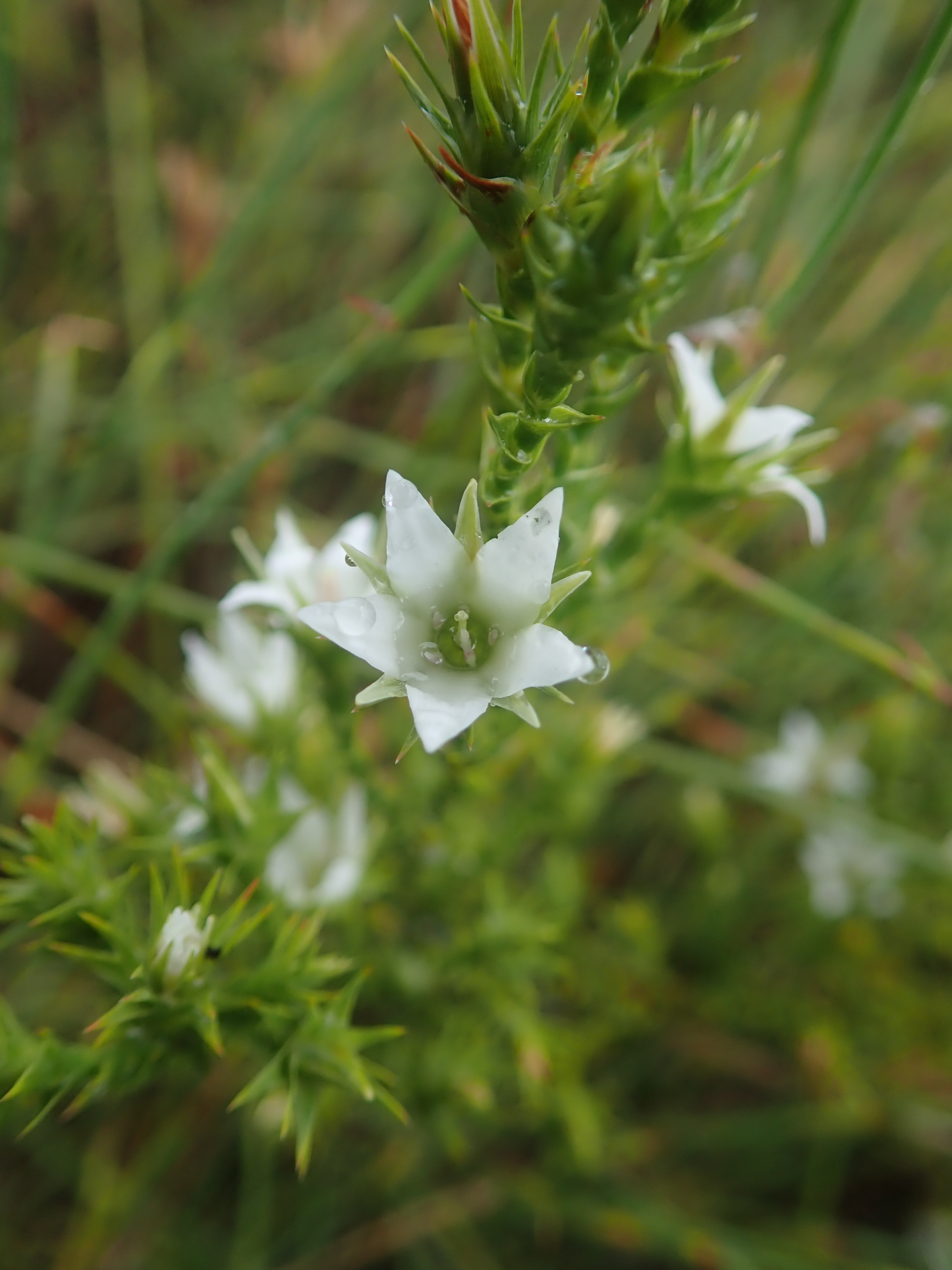
- Near Cooloola, Queensland

Scientific classification
- Kingdom: Plantae
- Clade: Tracheophytes
- Clade: Angiosperms
- Clade: Eudicots
- Clade: Asterids
- Order: Ericales
- Family: Ericaceae
- Genus: Sprengelia
- Species: S. sprengelioides

Binomial name
- Sprengelia sprengelioides (R.Br. Druce

Synonyms
- Ponceletia sprengelioides R.Br.; Sprengelia ponceletia F.Muell. nom. illeg., nom. superfl.

= Sprengelia sprengelioides =

Species of plant

Sprengelia sprengelioides is a species of flowering plant of the family Ericaceae, and is endemic to near-coastal areas of eastern Australia. It is an erect shrub with egg-shaped leaves, and white flowers arranged singly in leaf axils.

== Description ==
Sprengelia sprengelioides is an erect, glabrous shrub that typically grows to a height of 0.3–1 m (1 ft 0 in – 3 ft 3 in) and has wiry stems. The leaves are egg-shaped, 4–12 mm (0.16–0.47 in) long and 1.5–3.2 mm (0.059–0.126 in) wide with a small point on the end and minute teeth on the edges. The flowers are arranged singly in leaf axils, with egg-shaped bracts 7–8 mm (0.28–0.31 in) long at the base. The sepals are broad, green, egg-shaped, and 6–10 mm (0.24–0.39 in) long. The petals white, joined at the base to form a tube 2–3 mm (0.079–0.118 in) long with lobes 6 mm (0.24 in) long. Flowering occurs from June to September and the fruit is a capsule about 2.5 mm (0.098 in) in diameter.

== Taxonomy ==
This species was first formally described in 1810 by Robert Brown who gave it the name Ponceletia sprengelioides in his Prodromus Florae Novae Hollandiae et Insulae Van Diemen. In 1917, George Claridge Druce changed the name to Sprengelia sprengelioides in the supplement to The Botanical Exchange Club and Society of the British Isles Report for 1916. The specific epithet (sprengelioides) means "Sprengelia-like". (This species was originally in the genus Ponceletia.)

== Habitat and distribution ==
Sprengelia sprengelioides grows swampy heath, sometimes with Banksia robur or species of Xyris. It occurs in near-coastal areas of south-eastern Queensland, and south to the Sydney region of New South Wales.
