= Sprengelia minima =

Scientific classification
- Kingdom: Plantae
- Clade: Tracheophytes
- Clade: Angiosperms
- Clade: Eudicots
- Clade: Asterids
- Order: Ericales
- Family: Ericaceae
- Genus: Sprengelia
- Species: S. minima

Binomial name
- Sprengelia minima Crowden

Species of plant

Sprengelia minima is a species of flowering plant of the family Ericaceae, and is endemic to Tasmania. It is a small shrub usually growing in alpine cushion plants and has many branches, overlapping, stem-clasping, sharply-pointed leaves, and white, tube-shaped flowers arranged singly on the ends of branches.

== Description ==
Sprengelia minima is a small shrub that usually grows in alpine cushion plants, sometimes with prostrate branchlets on their surface, and has many branches. The leaves overlap each other and have a stem-sheathing base, tapering to a sharply-pointed tip, 3–5 mm (0.12–0.20 in) long and 1–2 mm (0.039–0.079 in) wide. The flowers are arranged singly, mainly on the ends of branches, with leaf-like bracts at the base. The sepals are broadly lance-shaped, 3.5–4.0 mm (0.14–0.16 in) long and the petals are white, joined at the base to form a tube about 0.5 mm (0.020 in) long with lobes 3.0–3.5 mm (0.12–0.14 in) long. Flowering occurs from December to January and the fruit is a capsule.

== Taxonomy ==
Sprengelia minima was first formally described in 2013 by R.K. Crowden in the journal Telopea. The specific epithet (minima) refers to the small size of the plant, compared to others in the genus.

== Habitat and distribution ==
This sprengelia is moderately common in alpine areas of Tasmania, including on Mount Field and the Hartz Range, where it grows in cushion plants like Dracophyllum minimum and Domatia novae-zelandiae.
