= Sprengelia distichophylla =

Scientific classification
- Kingdom: Plantae
- Clade: Tracheophytes
- Clade: Angiosperms
- Clade: Eudicots
- Clade: Asterids
- Order: Ericales
- Family: Ericaceae
- Genus: Sprengelia
- Species: S. distichophylla

Binomial name
- Sprengelia distichophylla Sm.

Synonyms
- Sprengelia incarnata var. distichophylla Rodway

Species of flowering plant

Sprengelia distichophylla is a species of flowering plant in the heath family Ericaceae and is endemic to Tasmania. It is a tufted shrub that typically grows to a height of 51–76 mm (2.0–3.0 in) with leaves about 2 mm (0.079 in) long, arranged in two closely overlapping rows, with the bases sheathing the stem. The flowers are arranged singly in leaf axils and are white, about 5 mm (0.20 in) long and bell-shaped. Flowering occurs in summer.

This species was first formally described in 1903 by Leonard Rodway who gave it the name Sprengelia incarnata var. distichophylla in The Tasmanian Flora. In 1963, Winifred Curtis raised the variety to species status as Sprengelia distichophylla in The Student's Flora of Tasmania. The specific epithet (distichophylla) means "having leaves in two rows".

This epacris grows in exposed in alpine scrub on the western mountains of Tasmania.
