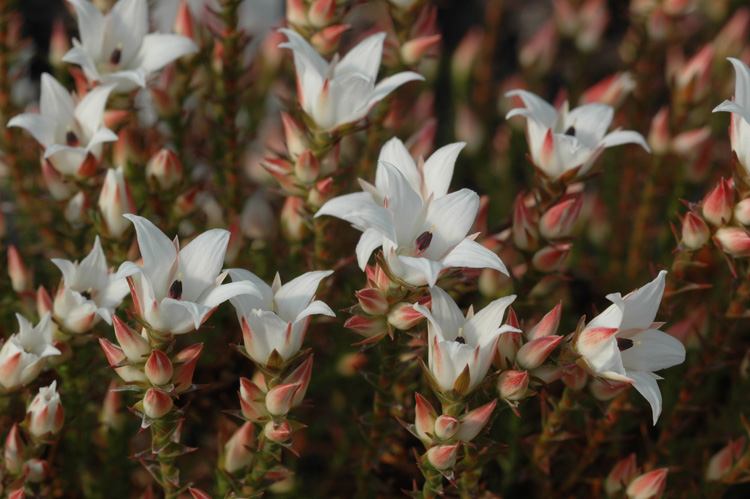
- In the Australian National Botanic Gardens

Scientific classification
- Kingdom: Plantae
- Clade: Tracheophytes
- Clade: Angiosperms
- Clade: Eudicots
- Clade: Asterids
- Order: Ericales
- Family: Ericaceae
- Genus: Sprengelia
- Species: S. monticola

Binomial name
- Sprengelia monticola (A.Cunn. ex DC.) Druce

Synonyms
- Ponceletia monticola A.Cunn. ex DC.; Sprengelia monticola (A.Cunn. ex DC.) Domin isonym; Sprengelia ponceletioides Sond.

= Sprengelia monticola =

Species of plant

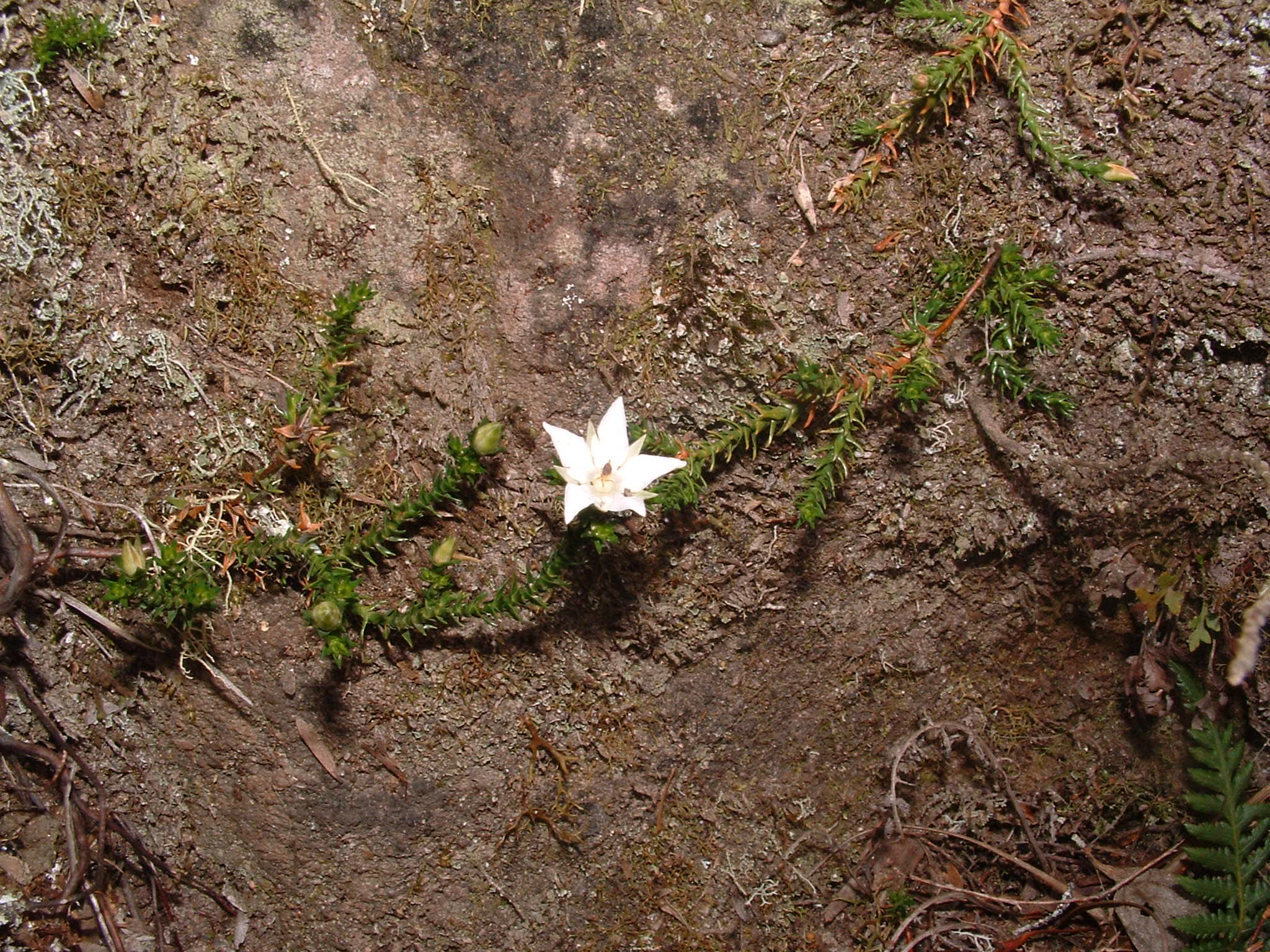
Habit in the Blue Mountains National Park

Sprengelia monticola, commonly known as rock sprengelia, is a species of flowering plant of the family Ericaceae, and is endemic to the Blue Mountains in eastern New South Wales. It is an open or low-lying shrub with egg-shaped to lance-shaped leaves, and white flowers arranged singly in leaf axils.

== Description ==
Sprengelia monticola is an open or low-lying, glabrous shrub that typically grows to a height of 20–50 cm (7.9–19.7 in). The leaves are egg-shaped to lance-shaped, 3.0–8.5 mm (0.12–0.33 in) long and 1.5–2.5 mm (0.059–0.098 in) wide with a small point on the end. The flowers are arranged singly in leaf axils, with tapering, egg-shaped bracts at the base. The sepals are triangular to egg-shaped, about 7 mm (0.28 in) long and the petals white, sometimes joined at the base to form a tube 0.2–0.3 mm (0.0079–0.0118 in) long with lobes 8–9 mm (0.31–0.35 in) long. Flowering occurs from September to December and the fruit is a capsule about 2 mm (0.079 in) in diameter.

== Taxonomy ==
This species was first formally described in 1839 by Augustin Pyramus de Candolle in Prodromus Systematis Naturalis Regni Vegetabilis and was given the name Ponceletia monticola from an unpublished description by Allan Cunningham. In 1917, George Claridge Druce changed the name to Sprengelia monticola in the supplement to The Botanical Exchange Club and Society of the British Isles Report for 1916. The specific epithet (monticola) means "dweller in mountains".

== Habitat and distribution ==
Rock sprengelia grows on wet sandstone rocks and cliff ledges in the Blue Mountains of eastern New South Wales, often with cliff ledge vegetation such as king fern (Todea barbara) and Dracophyllum secundum.
