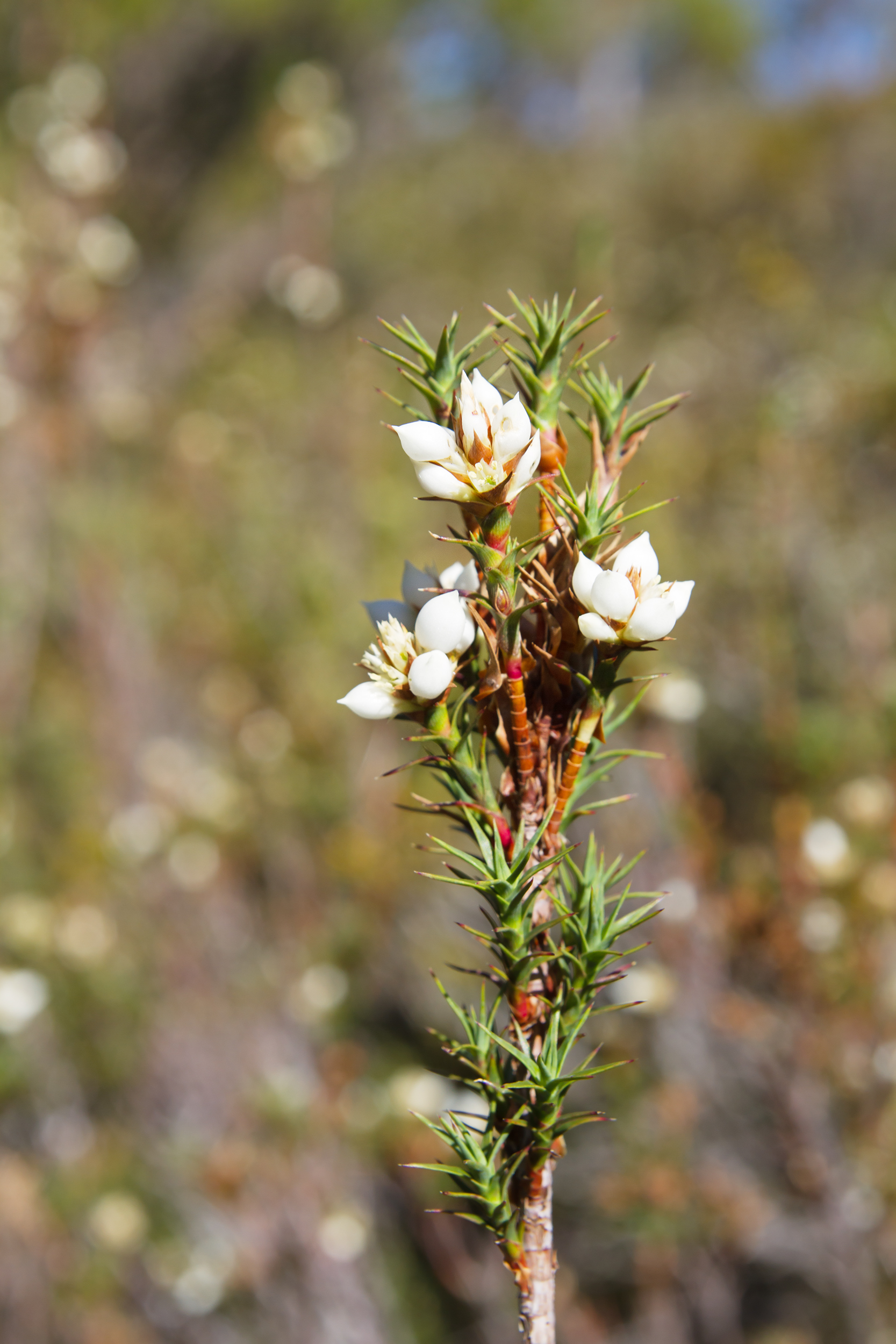
- Walls of Jerusalem National Park, Australia

Scientific classification
- Kingdom: Plantae
- Clade: Tracheophytes
- Clade: Angiosperms
- Clade: Eudicots
- Clade: Asterids
- Order: Ericales
- Family: Ericaceae
- Genus: Richea
- Species: R. acerosa

Binomial name
- Richea acerosa (Lindl.) F.Muell.

= Richea acerosa =

Species of flowering plant

Richea acerosa is a common plant in the family Ericaceae, endemic to Tasmania, Australia. The habitat is alpine and sub-alpine situations in the drier montane areas of the state, mostly in the north east. It may be distinguished from others in the genus by the narrow leaves.
