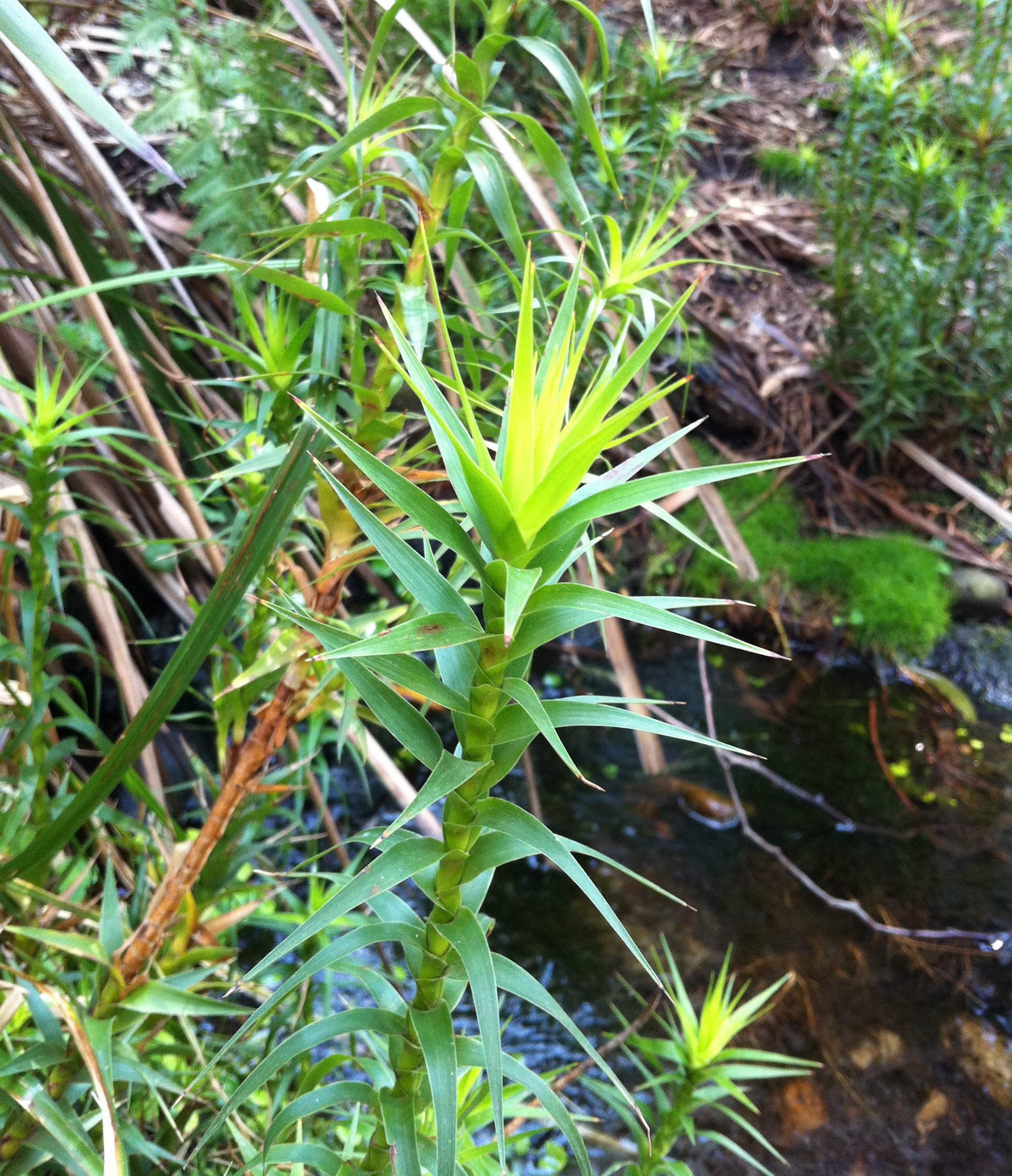

Scientific classification
- Kingdom: Plantae
- Clade: Tracheophytes
- Clade: Angiosperms
- Clade: Eudicots
- Clade: Asterids
- Order: Ericales
- Family: Ericaceae
- Genus: Richea
- Species: R. continentis

Binomial name
- Richea continentis B.L.Burtt

= Richea continentis =

Species of flowering plant

Richea continentis, the candle heath, is a species of flowering plant in the family Ericaceae that is endemic to Australia. It is multi-branched shrub growing to between 0.5 and 1 metre (1 ft 8 in and 3 ft 3 in) high. Leaves are 1 to 4 cm (0.39 to 1.57 in) long. The inflorescence is 30 cm (12 in) long with white to greenish-white flowers. The species was first formally described by English botanist Brian Laurence Burtt in 1942 in Botanical Magazine, based on the type specimen collected at Mount Hotham by botanist Ferdinand von Mueller. It occurs near watercourses or bogs in alpine or sub-alpine wet heathland in Victoria and New South Wales.
