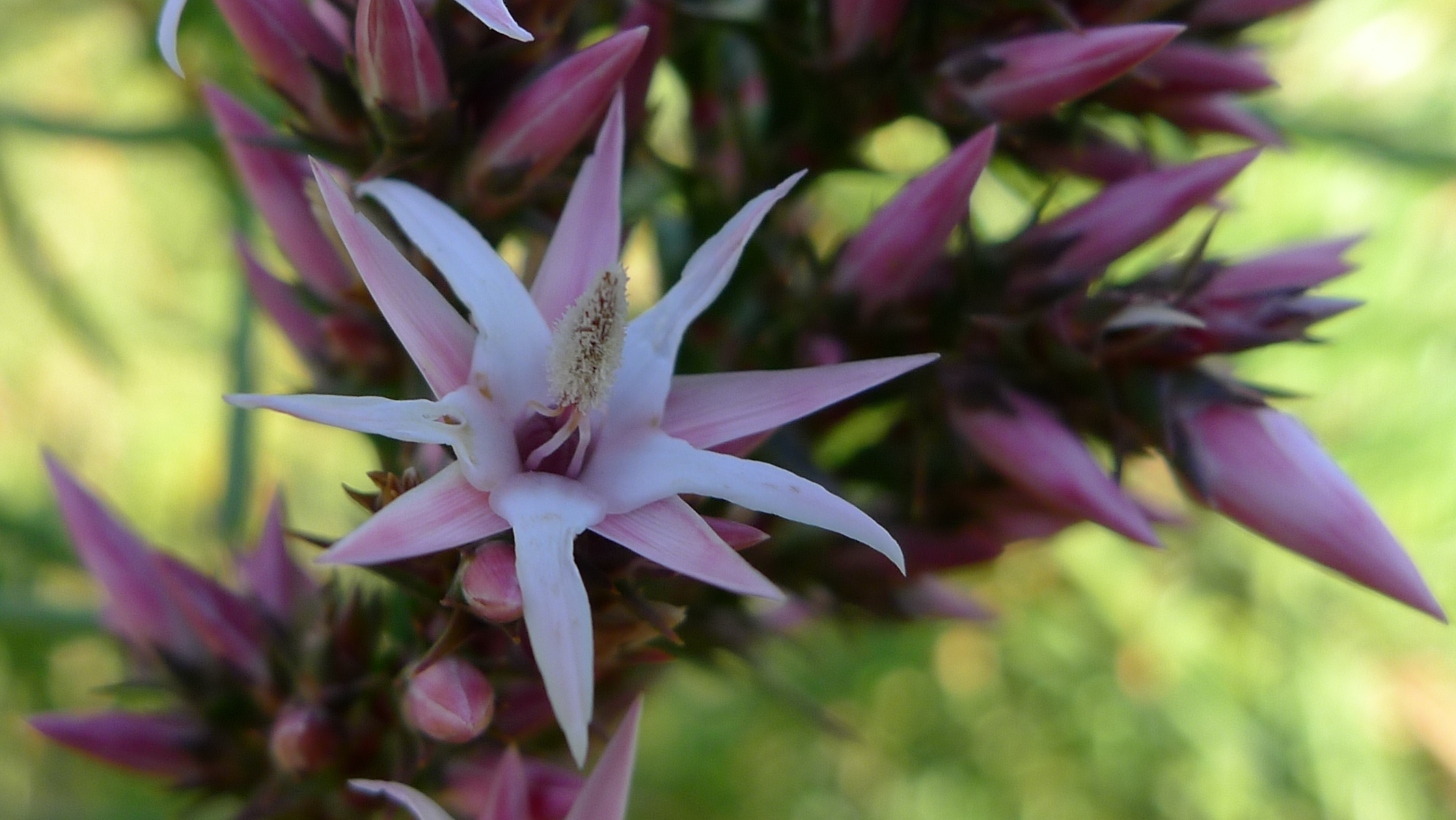
- In the Royal National Park

Scientific classification
- Kingdom: Plantae
- Clade: Tracheophytes
- Clade: Angiosperms
- Clade: Eudicots
- Clade: Asterids
- Order: Ericales
- Family: Ericaceae
- Genus: Sprengelia
- Species: S. incarnata

Binomial name
- Sprengelia incarnata Sm.

Synonyms
- Poiretia cucullata Cav.; Sprengelia incarnata Sm. f. incarnata; Sprengelia incarnata Sm. var. incarnata

= Sprengelia incarnata =

Species of plant

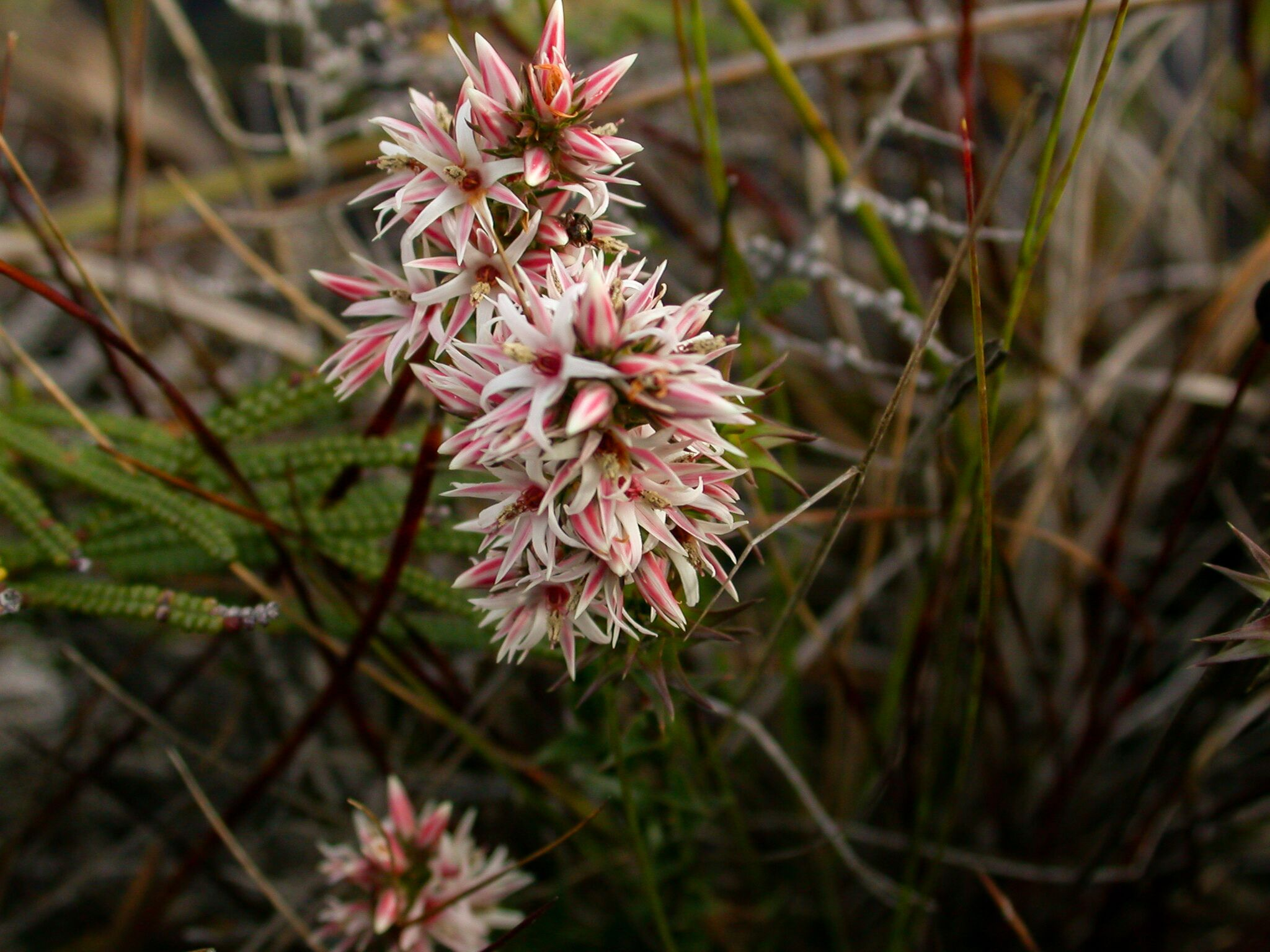
Elongated flower clusters

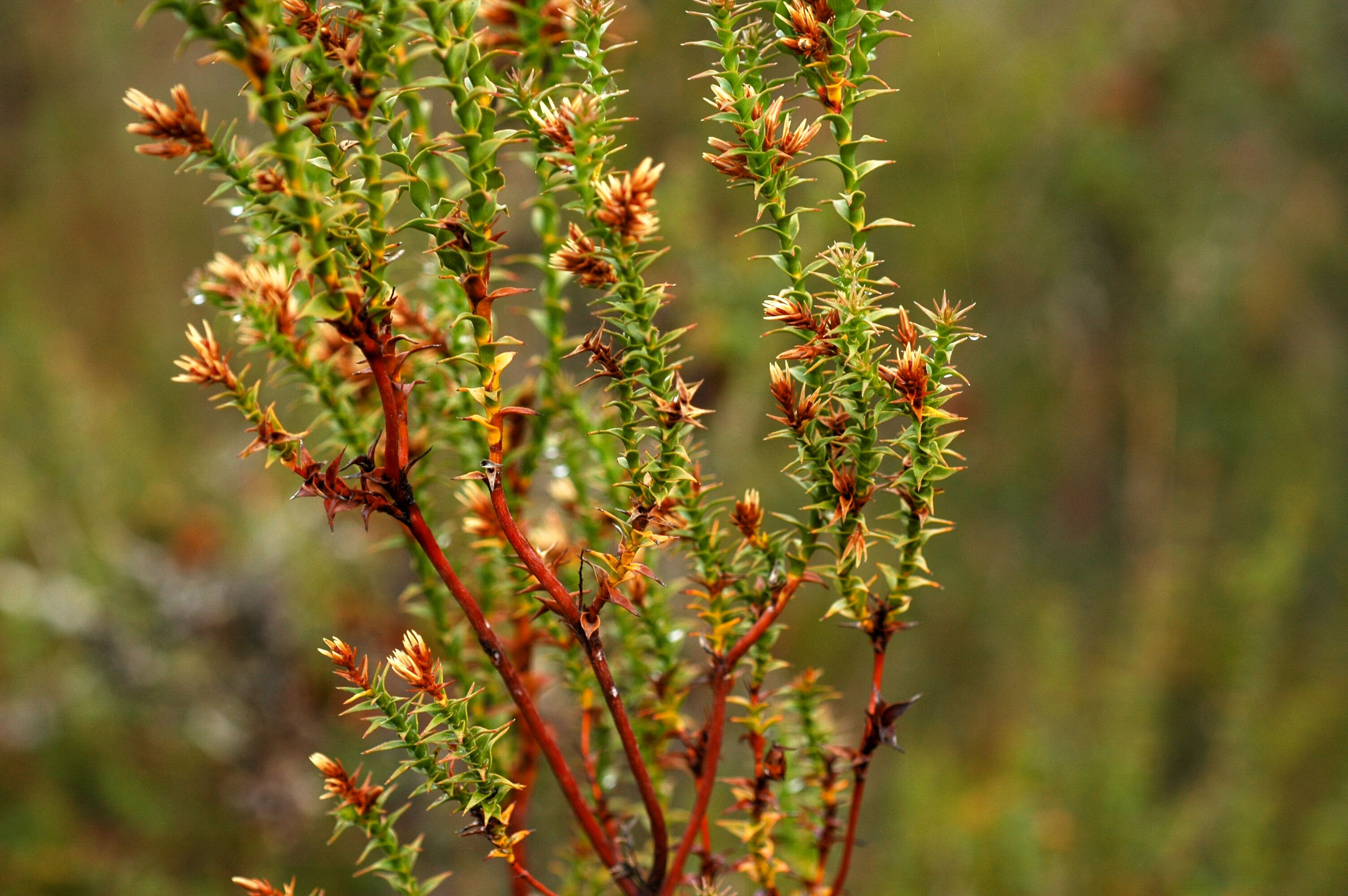
Smooth, reddish stems

Sprengelia incarnata, commonly referred to as pink swamp-heath, is a species of flowering plant of the family Ericaceae, and is native to south-eastern Australia and New Zealand. It is an erect, glabrous shrub with sharply-pointed, stem-clasping, egg-shaped leaves, and clusters of pink, tube-shaped flowers with spreading lobes.

== Description ==
Sprengelia incarnata is an erect, glabrous shrub that typically grows to a height of 0.5–2 m (1 ft 8 in – 6 ft 7 in), and has reddish-brown to red stems. The leaves are egg-shaped to lance-shaped, 3–20 mm (0.12–0.79 in) long and 2–6 mm (0.079–0.236 in) wide, with a stem-clasping base and a sharp point 0.4–0.7 mm (0.016–0.028 in) long on the tip. The flowers are borne in clusters of 3 to 20 in spikes 7–20 mm (0.28–0.79 in) long near the ends of stems, with bracts and bracteoles 5–10 mm (0.20–0.39 in) long at the base. The sepals are usually pink, narrowly triangular to lance-shaped and 3.8–5.5 mm (0.15–0.22 in) long and the petals are usually pink, joined at the base to form a tube 0.5–1.3 mm (0.020–0.051 in) long with spreading, narrowly triangular lobes 3–5 mm (0.12–0.20 in) long. Flowering mainly occurs from June to October or December and the fruit is a capsule 2–3 mm (0.079–0.118 in) long.

The Tasmanian endemics Richea sprengelioides and R. procera are similar, but have leaf scars on the stems that are not present on the smooth stems of S. incarnata.

== Taxonomy ==
Sprengelia incarnata was first formally described in 1794 by James Edward Smith in Kongliga Vetenskaps Academiens Nya Handlingar. The specific epithet (incarnata) means "flesh-coloured".

== Habitat and distribution ==
Native to Australia and New Zealand, Sprengelia incarnata can be found growing in the wet swamps and heathlands in many of Australia’s south-eastern regions, and a select few areas of New Zealand. The species only occurs in the far south-east of South Australia, including on Kangaroo Island, in the southern half of Victoria, and on the coast and nearby tablelands of New South Wales south from Coffs Harbour. Pink swamp-heath is widespread and abundant in Tasmania, where is it found in almost all wet and peaty landscapes, ranging from sea level to the highest mountains. It is considered at high risk and naturally uncommon in New Zealand, where it is only found in the Fiordland National Park and on Resolution Island.
