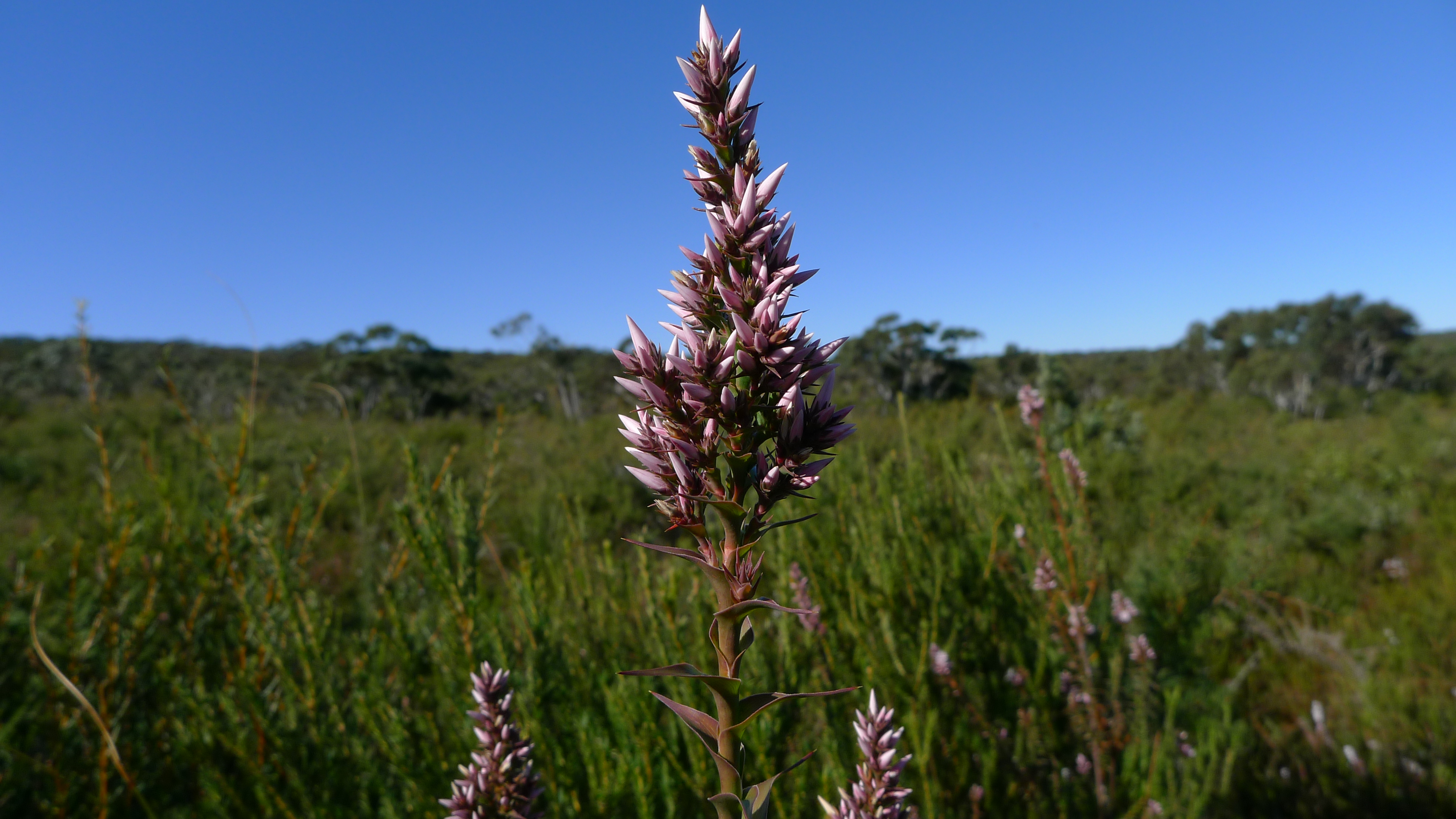
- Sprengelia incarnata

Scientific classification
- Kingdom: Plantae
- Clade: Tracheophytes
- Clade: Angiosperms
- Clade: Eudicots
- Clade: Asterids
- Order: Ericales
- Family: Ericaceae
- Subfamily: Epacridoideae
- Tribe: Cosmelieae
- Genus: Sprengelia; Sm.

Synonyms
- Poiretia Cav. nom. rej.; Ponceletia R.Br.; Sprengalia Andrews orth. var.; Sprengelia sect. Ponceletia (R.Br.) Kuntze; Sprengelia subg. Eusprengelia Drude nom. inval.; Sprengelia subg. Ponceletia (R.Br.) Drude; Springalia Andrews

= Sprengelia =

Family of shrubs

Sprengelia is a genus of flowering plants in the family Ericaceae and is endemic to eastern Australia. Plants in the genus Sprengelia are slender, erect or low-lying shrubs with overlapping, stem-clasping leaves, many bracts at the base of the flowers, the sepals egg-shaped, white or coloured, the five petals with spreading lobes, and the fruit a capsule.

The genus Sprengelia was first formally described in 1794 by James Edward Smith in the journal Kongliga Vetenskaps Academiens Nya Handlingar, later published in translation in Tracts relating to natural history. The first species described was Sprengelia incarnata. The genus name honours the German botanist Christian Konrad Sprengel.

The names of seven species are accepted by the Australian Plant Census:

- Sprengelia distichophylla (Rodway) W.M.Curtis (Tas.)
- Sprengelia incarnata Sm. - pink swamp-heath (S.A., N.S.W., Vic., Tas.)
- Sprengelia minima Crowden (Tas.)
- Sprengelia montana R.Br. (Tas.)
- Sprengelia monticola (DC.) Druce - rock sprengelia (N.S.W)
- Sprengelia propinqua A.Cunn. ex DC. (Tas.)
- Sprengelia sprengelioides (R.Br.) Druce (Qld., N.S.W.)
