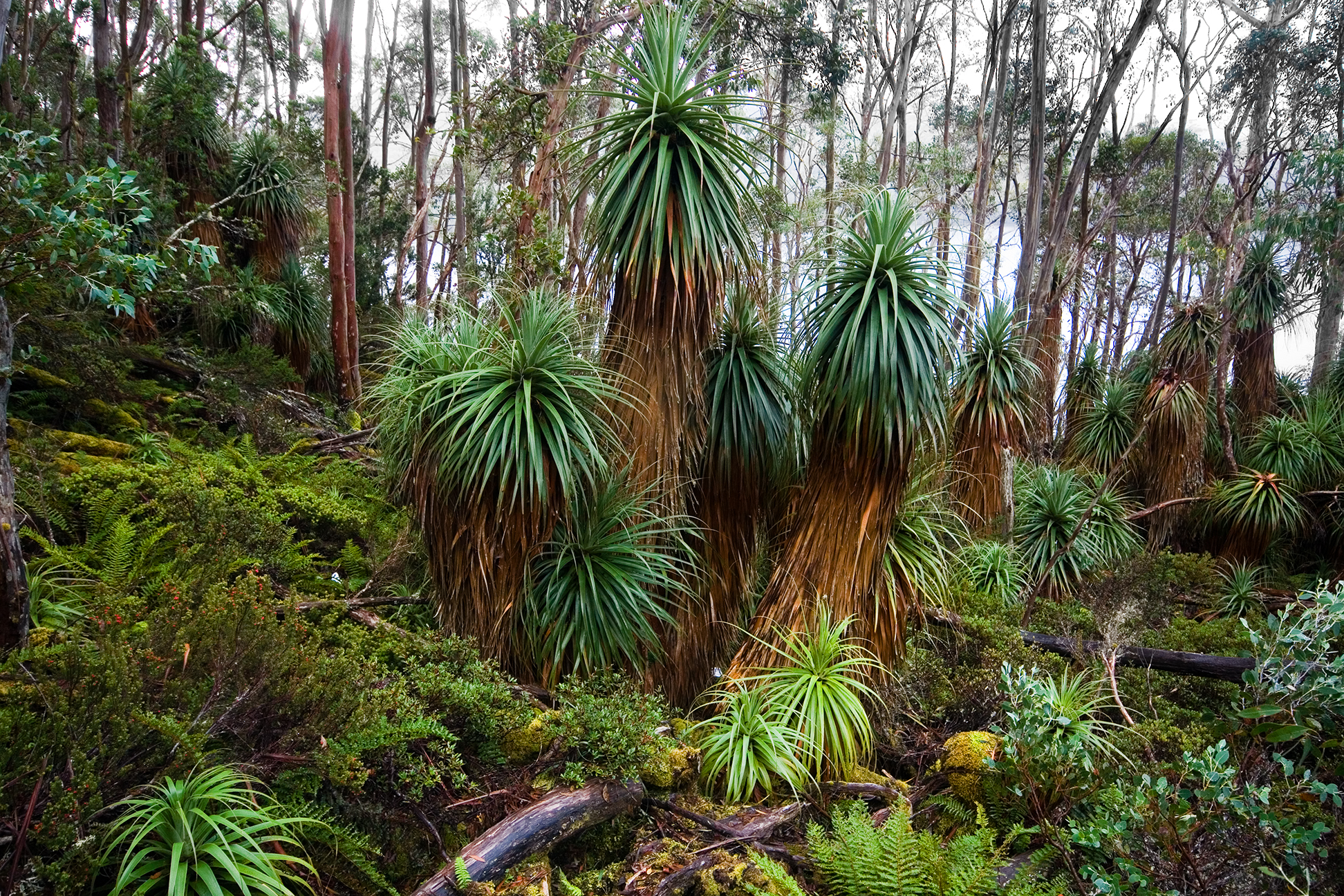
- Richea pandanifolia

Scientific classification
- Kingdom: Plantae
- Clade: Tracheophytes
- Clade: Angiosperms
- Clade: Eudicots
- Clade: Asterids
- Order: Ericales
- Family: Ericaceae
- Subfamily: Epacridoideae
- Tribe: Richeeae
- Genus: Richea; R.Br.

Species
- See text

= Richea =

Genus of flowering plants

Richea is a genus of 11 species of flowering plants in the family Ericaceae. Nine of the species are endemic to Tasmania and the other two are endemic to the south-east of the Australian mainland.

Species include:

- Richea acerosa (Lindl.) F.Muell.
- Richea alpina Menadue
- Richea continentis B.L.Burtt – Candle heath
- Richea dracophylla R.Br. – Dragonleaf richea
- Richea gunnii Hook.f. – Gunn's candle heath
- Richea milliganii (Hook.f.) F.Muell. – Milligan's candle heath or nodding candle heath
- Richea pandanifolia Hook.f. – Pandani or giant grass tree
- Richea procera (F.Muell.) F.Muell. – Lowland richea
- Richea scoparia Hook.f. – Scoparia
- Richea sprengelioides (R.Br.) F.Muell.
- Richea victoriana Menadue
- Richea × curtisiae A.M.Gray
