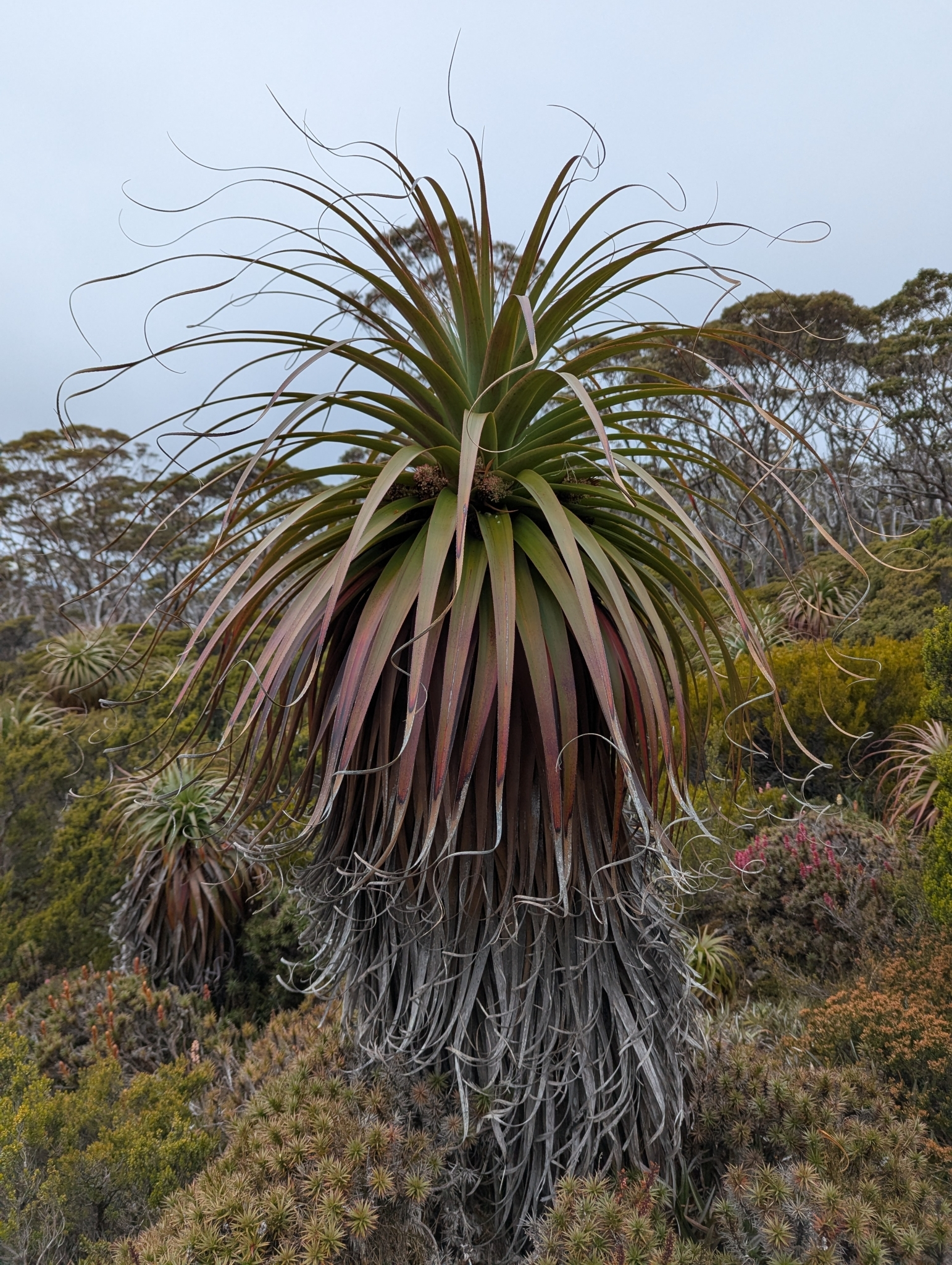
- Richea pandanifolia in Mount Field National Park

Scientific classification
- Kingdom: Plantae
- Clade: Tracheophytes
- Clade: Angiosperms
- Clade: Eudicots
- Clade: Asterids
- Order: Ericales
- Family: Ericaceae
- Genus: Richea
- Species: R. pandanifolia

Binomial name
- Richea pandanifolia Hook.f.

Synonyms
- Cystanthe pandanifolia (Hook.f.) Kuntze

= Richea pandanifolia =

Species of tree

Richea pandanifolia, the pandani or giant grass tree, is a distinctive endemic Tasmanian angiosperm. It is dicot of the family Ericaceae and is found in central, western and south west Tasmania.

== Description ==
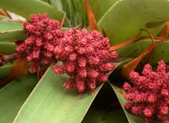
Inflorescence at leaf axis

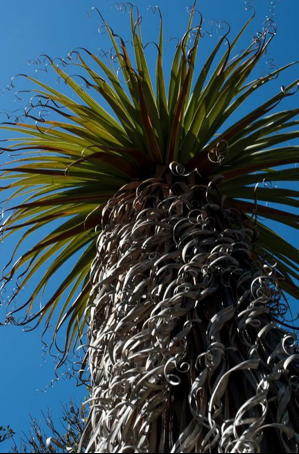
Persistent leaves

Richea pandanifolia can be described as an erect tree or shrub. It grows from 2 to 12 metres (6 ft 7 in to 39 ft 4 in) in height. While it usually grows from just one stem, it can sometimes be branched. This branching occurs in the lowland subspecies as well as in damaged alpine plants.

The species has strap-like leaves that taper to points and can grow up to 1 metre (3 ft 3 in) long. These are dense and form from terminus branches. As the leaves age they are persistent, meaning that they remain on the plant. Young leaves are green in colour but as they age they become a greyish brown. The margins of these leaves are serrated and can cut human skin.

Inflorescences emerge from the leaf axils on structures called panicles (branched inflorescence) which can grow up to 25 centimetres (10 in) long. Their flowers can be either white of deep pink in colour.

== Taxonomy ==
The first European description of this plant was by botanist Joseph Dalton Hooker in his 1844 publication The botany of the Antarctic voyage of H.M. discovery ships Erebus and Terror. I. Flora Antarctica. In this publication Hooke named the species "Richea pandanifolia". In 1891, Otto Kuntze transferred it to the genus Cystanthe.

There are two subspecies:

- Richea pandanifolia Hook.f. subsp. pandanifolia
- Richea pandanifolia subsp. ramulosa

Richea pandanifolia can hybridise with Richea scoparia to make R. × curtisiae.

Richea pandanifolia is sometimes confused with Dracophyllum milliganii. R. pandanifolia can be distinguished from this rare species as D. milliganii has terminal inflorescence whereas R. pandanifolia 's inflorescence is in the leaf axis. R. pandanifolia also has serrated leaf margins whereas D. milliganii has smooth leaf margins.

== Distribution and habitat ==
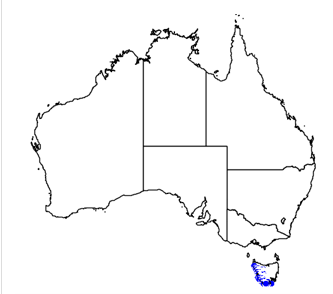
Richea pandanifolia distribution

Richea pandanifolia is endemic to Tasmania; it grows in alpine areas in central, western and southern Tasmania, and in the rainforests of the south-west.

It can be found in deciduous heath, coniferous heath, alpine sedge land and heath in the central and western mountains. It is also found in rain forests where it is more common as a tree.

== Diversity and endemism ==
Richea pandanifolia is endemic to Tasmania, as are nine of the 11 species in the genus Richea.

Two theories may explain the diversity of Richea species in Tasmania. One proposes that the diversity in endemic Tasmanian Richea species could be due to them being the relics of Gondwanan fragmentation. The other theory proposes that the diversity is the result of speciation subsequent to the breaking up of Gondwana. This unusual display of endemism can be explained in part as Richea is a genus of Gondwanan origin. Since the break-up of Gondwana, mainland Australia has become inhospitable for many Gondwanan species and Tasmania has become a refuge for many genera that used to thrive on the supercontinent.

== See also ==
- Dicksonia antarctica
