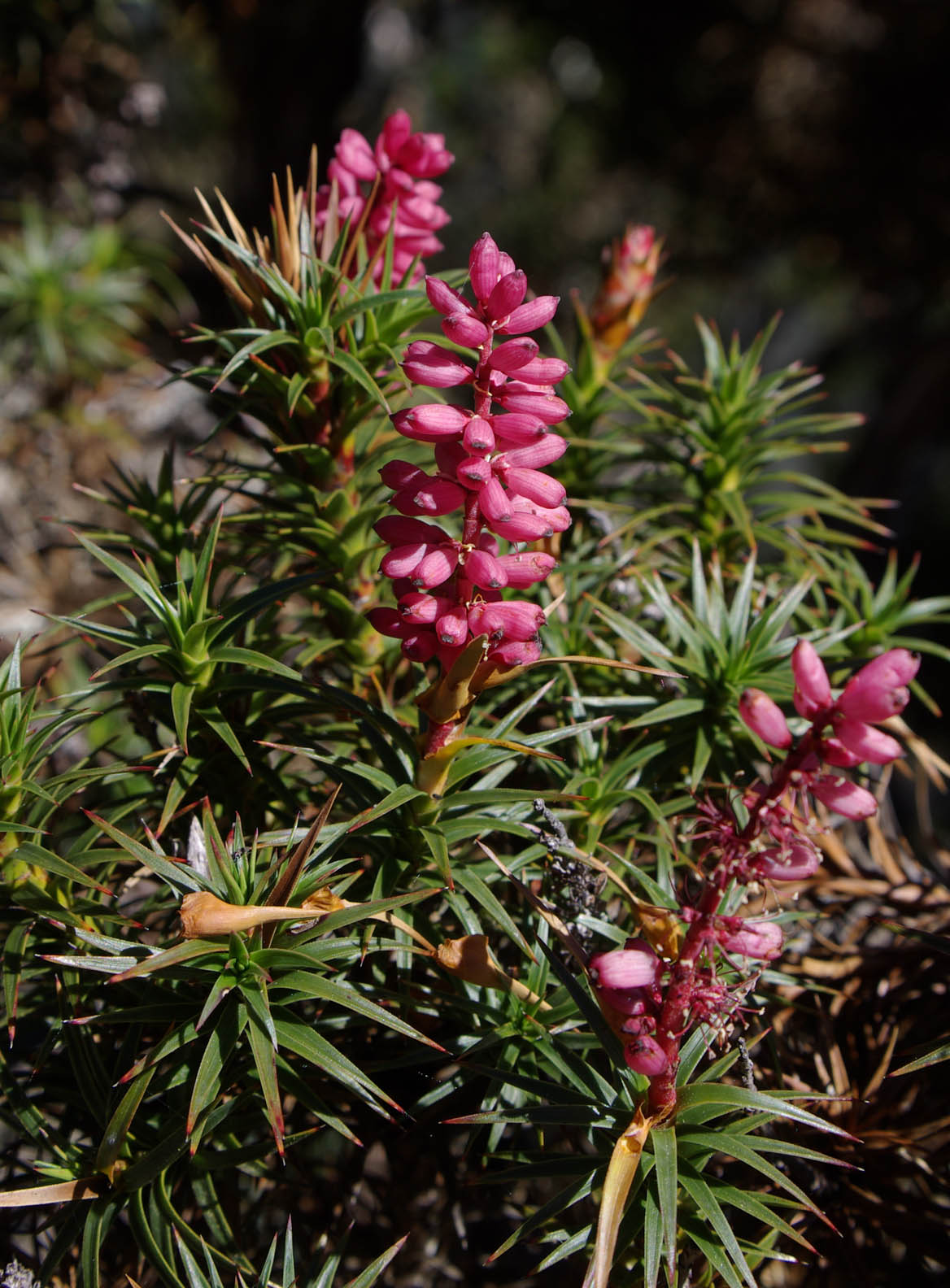
- Richea scoparia flowering in Mount Field National Park, Tasmania

Scientific classification
- Kingdom: Plantae
- Clade: Tracheophytes
- Clade: Angiosperms
- Clade: Eudicots
- Clade: Asterids
- Order: Ericales
- Family: Ericaceae
- Genus: Richea
- Species: R. scoparia

Binomial name
- Richea scoparia Hook.f.

Synonyms
- Richea angustifolia

= Richea scoparia =

Species of flowering plant

Richea scoparia is a species of plant endemic to Tasmania. The genus Richea, forms part of the Ericaceae (formerly Epacridaceae) family, which are commonly heath-like shrubs. The name refers to the erect bushy growth habit, described as a broom-like shrub, most commonly referred to as the honey bush or simply scoparia to many bushwalkers.

== Description ==
Richea scoparia is 1–3 m high and commonly grows in wind-swept regions of mountains. The leaves persist for a number of years, even when dead. Leaves are crowded, sharp pointed, linear-lanceolate with a broad sheathing base, 3–6 cm long. Inflorescences are terminal spikes 4–12 cm in varying colours of orange, yellow, red, pink or white, flowering in January to March. Flowers with caps of joined petals, which are deciduous, exposing 5 mm long stamens and a short style.

=== Hybrid ===
Richea scoparia forms a hybrid species with Richea pandanifolia. The hybrid species, Richea curtisiae is relatively common where both R. scoparia and R. pandanifolia occur, especially after a disturbance as a result of fire or a clearing.

== Distribution ==
Richea scoparia is found in montane vegetation and is subject to harsh conditions throughout several months of the year. It occurs in the west, south-west, north-east and Central Plateau of Tasmania in a variety of habitats above 700m. It is widespread in alpine regions and associated with a number of varying species. R. scoparia is a slow growing, scleromorphic, perennial species with many morphological variabilities. The growth habits and morphology of R. scoparia populations are influenced by the level of difference weather conditions, to which each population is exposed. The exposure to wind speed and direction have a predominant effect on growth rate and success of the species, which grows as a dense rounded bush in highly exposed areas.

== Reproduction ==
Richea scoparia and Niveoscincus microlepidotus (snow skink) form a unique interaction, where N. microlepidotus aids in the pollination of R. scoparia by removing the calyptra (fused petal caps) of the inflorescence to feed on the nectar of the plant. This exposes the reproductive parts which increases the number of seeds dispersed and pollination success of the plant. This interaction has been thought to have been an adaptation to the harsh weather conditions by evolving with the lizards feeding habits to ensure the success of calyptra removal and dispersal of seeds.
