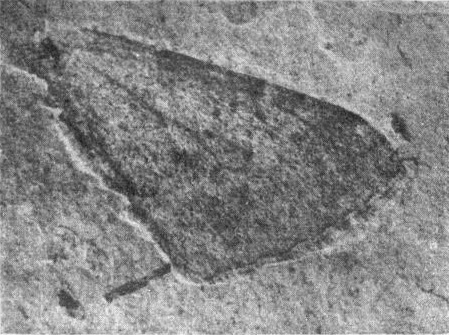
- Holotype forewing

Scientific classification
- Kingdom: Animalia
- Phylum: Arthropoda
- Class: Insecta
- Order: Lepidoptera
- Family: Geometridae
- Tribe: Hydriomenini
- Genus: Hydriomena (?)
- Species: H.? protrita

Binomial name
- Hydriomena? protrita Cockerell, 1922

= Hydriomena? protrita =

Hydriomena? protrita Temporal range: Priabonian 35 Ma

Extinct species of moth

Hydriomena? protrita is an extinct species of moth in the family Geometridae, and possibly in the modern genus Hydriomena. The species is known from late Eocene, Priabonian stage, lake deposits of the Florissant Formation in Teller County, Colorado, United States. It was first described by Theodore Dru Alison Cockerell in 1922.

== History and classification ==
Hydriomena? protrita is known only from one fossil, the holotype, specimen "AMNH-FI-19033". It is a single, complete forewing, preserved as a compression fossil in fine grained shale. The shale specimen is one of a group of fossils obtained in 1909 by George F. Sternberg, Terry Duce, and Willard Rusk from the Florissant Formation, named for its outcrop around Florissant, Colorado. The type specimen is currently preserved in the paleoentomological collections housed in the American Museum of Natural History in New York City. H.? protrita was first studied by Dr. Theodore D. A. Cockerell of the University of Colorado, with his 1922 type description being published in the journal American Museum Novitates. Though Cockerell did not provide an explicit explanation for the specific epithet protrita. The description of the specimen was delayed for five years due expectation that the description of the fossil would be completed by another researcher in 1910. However, after the description failed to be presented, Cockerell wrote the American Museum Novitates article rather than let the fossil continue to go undescribed.

At the time of description, the Florissant Formation was considered to be Miocene in age. Further refinement of the formation's dating has resulted in an age of 34 million years. This places the formation in the Eocene Priabonian stage.

== Description ==
The holotype forewing of Hydriomena? protrita is about 23 millimetres (0.91 in) in length with a 14.5 millimetres (0.57 in) outer margin, a 17 millimetres (0.67 in) lower margin and the color patterning faintly preserved. The wing has a checkered patterning in the fringe along the hind margin; the costal area is dark in coloration and broken by the antemedial band. Near the apical end of the costal cell is a distinct spot or pair of bars in a placement very similar to the antemedian mark of the modern species Hydriomena manzanita. The basal area of the wing is pallid, and the subbasal line is faint. The admedial band is similar to that of H. manzanita, but farther from the wing base and having a broader, less abrupt curvature.

H.? protrita was the first member of the family Geometridae to be described from the American fossil record. The placement of H.? protrita is noted by Cockerell to be uncertain.
