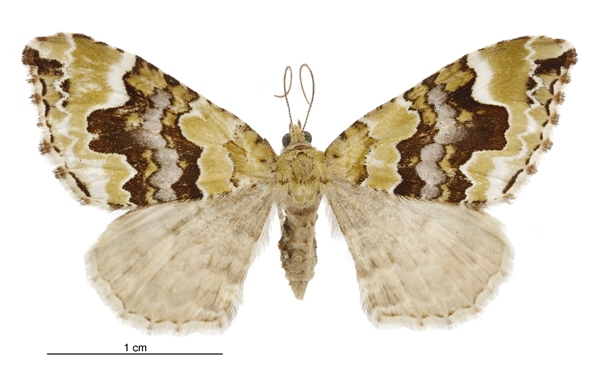
- Female
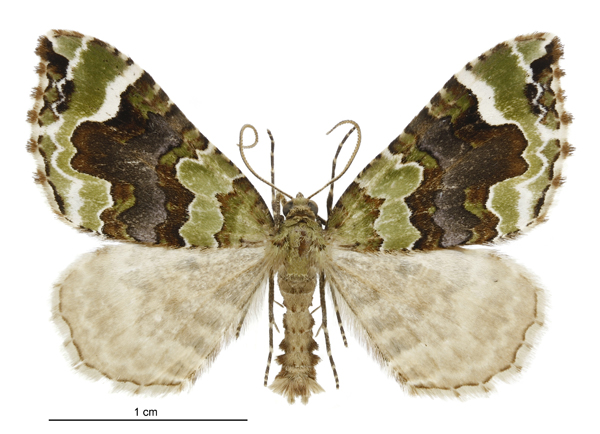
- Male

Scientific classification
- Kingdom: Animalia
- Phylum: Arthropoda
- Clade: Pancrustacea
- Class: Insecta
- Order: Lepidoptera
- Family: Geometridae
- Genus: Hydriomena
- Species: H. purpurifera

Binomial name
- Hydriomena purpurifera (Fereday, 1883)

Synonyms
- Cidaria purpurifera Fereday, 1883; Euphyia purpurifera cohreifera Prout, 1939; Euphyia purpurifera (Fereday, 1883)

= Hydriomena purpurifera =

Species of moth endemic to New Zealand

Hydriomena purpurifera, also known as the green and purple carpet moth, is a species of moth in the family Geometridae. It was first described by Richard William Fereday in 1883. The classification of New Zealand endemic moths within the genus Hydriomena is regarded as unsatisfactory and in need of revision. As such this species is currently also known as Hydriomena (s.l.) purpurifera. This species is endemic to New Zealand and is found in the North and South Islands. This species frequents forests at elevations of between 1,000 feet (300 m) to 3,000 feet (910 m). The larval host plant are species in the genus Epilobium. Larvae have also been bred on species in the genus Plantago. The larvae feed over winter and pupate on the ground. Adults are on the wing from December to March.

== Taxonomy ==
This species was first described by Richard William Fereday in 1883 and originally named Cidaria purpurifera. In 1917 Edward Meyrick placed this species in the genus Hydriomena. George Hudson discussed and illustrated this species under the name Hydriomena purpurifera in his 1898 book New Zealand moths and butterflies (Macro-lepidoptera), in his 1928 book The butterflies and moths of New Zealand and again in his 1939 book A supplement to the butterflies and moths of New Zealand. In 1939 Louis Beethoven Prout discussed this species under the name Euphyia and also described a subspecies which he named Euphyia purpurifera cohreifera. In 1988 John S. Dugdale synonymised Euphyia purpurifera cohreifera into H. purpurifera. The male lectotype, collected at Mount Hutt by Fereday, is held at the Canterbury Museum.

The classification of New Zealand endemic moths within the genus Hydriomena is regarded as unsatisfactory and in need of revision. As such this species is currently also known as Hydriomena (s.l.) purpurifera.

== Description ==
Adult camouflaged amongst lichen and moss.

Illustration of larva.

Fereday originally described the adults of this species as follows:

Primaries olive green with dark chocolate lines and markings ; a very broad central belt with broad obtuse projection between 1st and 3rd median nervules ; central area of the belt traversed by a broad pale purplish band, the other part of the belt being olive green suffused and blotched with dark chocolate-brown; a very conspicuous narrow white band beyond the central belt, and thin white subterminal line; fringe chequered.

Secondaries tawny ochreous with some indistinct transverse lines.

Expanse of wings 11 to 14 lines.

Hudson described the adults as follows:

The expansion of the wings is from 1 to 1/4 inches. The fore-wings are rather bright green; there is a darker area near the base, a very broad purplish-brown central band, with a large square projection on the middle of its outer edge; above this projection there is a very conspicuous white mark, bordering the central band; the remainder of the wing is green; there is a wavy white subterminal line, and an oblique bluish-black mark near the apex. The hind-wings are pale brownish-ochreous.

This species varies in the intensity and depth of its colouring. The hindwings can range in colour from ochreous-brown to whitish-ochreous. It is similar in appearance to its sister species H. rixata but can be distinguished by its brighter green colouring, the purplish central band with square projection and the broad white marking beyond that central band.

The eggs were described by Hudson as:

The egg, which is laid on its side, is about 1/50 inch long, oval, with a deep depression on upper side, and numerous rather shallow hexagonal pits; pale whitish-ochreous, becoming dark ochreous two or three days after being deposited.

Hudson described the larva as follows:

The young larva, when first hatched, is about 1/16 inch long; bright ochreous-yellow, slightly greenish near middle; the head is brownish; dorsal portion of segment 2 slightly horny and darker; segments 3 and 4 with transverse row of very distinct darker warts, each emitting a rather short, stout, blackish bristle; other segments with two rows of similar warts and bristles.
The length of the larva, when nearly full-grown, is about 3/4 inch; stout, slightly tapering towards each extremity; surface extremely irregular, with numerous bright green festoons, projections, and filaments, the general colour of the central portions of the larva being dark brown, or dark greenish-brown; head and dorsal surface of segment 2 wholly green, also legs; segments 3 and 4 with raised lateral ridge, and small green tubercles, segments 5 to 10 inclusive with two rows of about ten green tubercles, or short filaments; lateral ridge modified into conspicuous green festoons; remaining segments furnished with longer filaments, especially posteriorly; prolegs close together, light green; the summit of most of the tubercles and filaments is furnished with a stout black bristle, and similar bristles are numerous on the head, thoracic, and posterior segments. Very variable in the extent and depth of brown and green colouring.

Hudson described the pupa as follows:

The pupa is slightly under 1/2 inch in length, stout cylindrical, slightly dilated towards extremities of wing-cases; abdominal segments small, with sharp spine at cremaster. Colour black, very slightly tinged with brown. It is enclosed in a frail earthern cocoon.

== Distribution ==
This species is endemic to New Zealand. It is found in the North and South Islands.

== Habitat ==
This species frequents forests at elevations of between 1,000 feet (300 m) to 3,000 feet (910 m). Hudson stated that the species was found in dryer situations than H. rixata and is not confined to forest streams. The larval host plant are species in the genus Epilobium and they have been bred on species in the genus Plantago.

== Behaviour ==
Live moth at rest.

Larvae do not eat the eggshells from which they hatch and are active when young. When mature the larvae have sluggish habits and feed slowly during the winter months. They pupate on the ground. Adults are on the wing from December to March. The moth rests on tree-trunks with its wings half extended, the fore-wings covering the hind-wings and the tip of the abdomen elevated. In this position it resembles a moderate-sized lichen.
