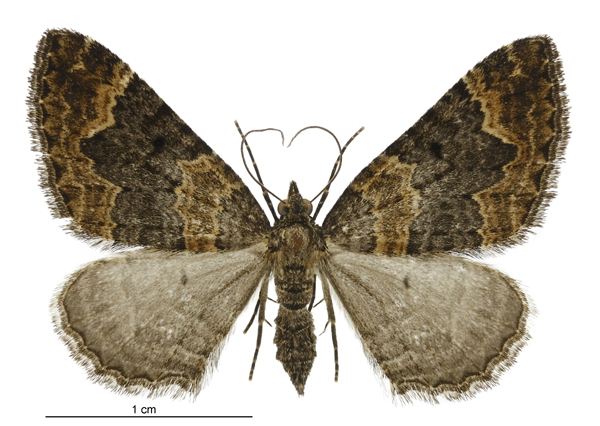
- Female
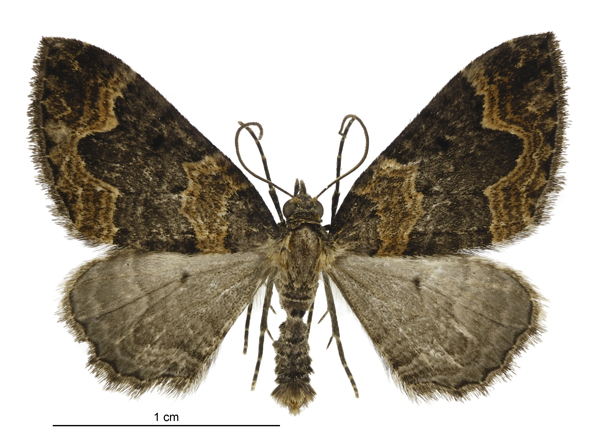
- Male

Scientific classification
- Kingdom: Animalia
- Phylum: Arthropoda
- Clade: Pancrustacea
- Class: Insecta
- Order: Lepidoptera
- Family: Geometridae
- Genus: Hydriomena
- Species: H. hemizona

Binomial name
- Hydriomena hemizona Meyrick, 1897

= Hydriomena hemizona =

Species of moth endemic to New Zealand

Hydriomena hemizona is a species of moth in the family Geometridae. It was first described by Edward Meyrick in 1897. However the classification of New Zealand endemic moths within the genus Hydriomena is regarded as unsatisfactory and in need of revision. As such this species is currently also known as Hydriomena (s.l.) hemizona. This species is endemic to New Zealand and is found in the North and South Islands. It inhabits native forest, including native beech forest, at montane and subalpine altitudes. H. hemizona is regarded as being rare. Adults are variable in appearance and are on the wing from October until April.

== Taxonomy ==
This species was first described by Edward Meyrick in 1897 using a specimen collected by George Hudson at Cape Terāwhiti at approximately 1,500 feet (460 m). Hudson discussed and illustrated this species in his 1898 book New Zealand moths and butterflies (Macro-lepidoptera) and his 1928 book The butterflies and moths of New Zealand. In 1971 John S. Dugdale hypothesised that this species may belong in the genus Cephalissa. However in 1988 Dugdale confirmed the placement of this species in the genus Hydriomena. The male holotype is held at the Natural History Museum, London.

The classification of New Zealand endemic moths within the genus Hydriomena is regarded as unsatisfactory and in need of revision. As such this species is currently also known as Hydriomena (s.l.) hemizona.

== Description ==
Meyrick originally described the male of the species as follows:

♂. 25 mm. Head and thorax fuscous, darker-irrorated. Antennal ciliations 1/3. Forewings with termen waved, gently rounded, oblique ; fuscous, irrorated with dark fuscous, forming obscure striae ; median band somewhat darker, anterior edge preceded by an obscure pale ochreous-tinged stria, more whitish towards costa, posterior edge obtusely prominent at 1/4 from costa, and with a more rectangular prominence in middle, marked with a spot of blackish suffusion, followed by a dull whitish and then by a light brownish-ochreous stria, more conspicuous on upper half ; a small dark fuscous transverse discal spot. Hindwings pale fuscous.

Hudson described the adults of this species as follows:

The expansion of the wings is about 1 1/4 inches. All the wings are very glossy with slight bronzy reflections; the fore-wings are bronzy-brown with numerous wavy blackish transverse lines sometimes forming a fairly distinct median band which, however, is more often merged with the basal patch ; the outer edge of the median band has a large rounded projection and is often edged with white near the costa, it is rarely followed by an obscure reddish-brown wavy streak; an indistinct subterminal line is usually present. The hind-wings are pale bronzy-grey. The female is usually slightly larger and paler than the male.

It is similar in appearance to Hydriomena deltoidata but that species has much straighter transverse lines on the forewings. H. hemizona is also less robust looking. Alfred Philpott, when collecting this species in Otago, pointed out that some specimens have the median band strongly marked while in others it is hardly traceable.

== Distribution ==
H. hemizona is endemic to New Zealand and is found in both the North and South Islands. Hudson regarded this species as being rare.

== Habitat ==
This species frequents native beech forest at elevations of around 3,000 feet (910 m). Hudson stated he had collected the species on the Routeburn Track from foliage on overhanging banks in dense forest.

== Behaviour ==
Adults are on the wing from October to April but are most commonly observed from December until February.
