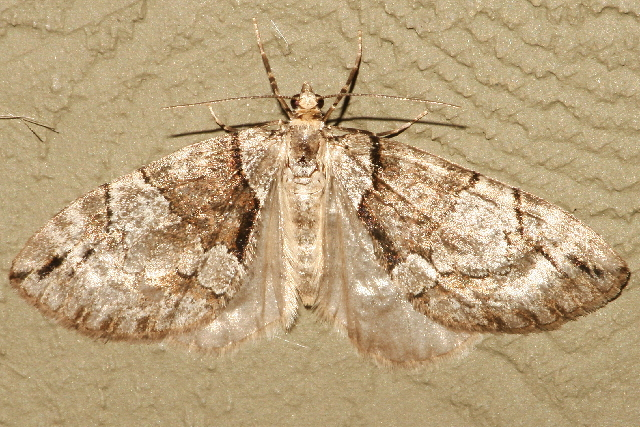

Scientific classification
- Kingdom: Animalia
- Phylum: Arthropoda
- Class: Insecta
- Order: Lepidoptera
- Family: Geometridae
- Genus: Hydriomena
- Species: H. exculpata

Binomial name
- Hydriomena exculpata Barnes & McDunnough, 1917

= Hydriomena exculpata =

Species of moth

Hydriomena exculpata is a species of moth in the family Geometridae first described by William Barnes and James Halliday McDunnough in 1917. It is found in North America.

The MONA or Hodges number for Hydriomena exculpata is 7223.

== Subspecies ==
Three subspecies belong to Hydriomena exculpata:

- Hydriomena exculpata exculpata^{g}
- Hydriomena exculpata josepha McDunnough, 1954^{c g}
- Hydriomena exculpata nanata McDunnough, 1954^{c g}

Data sources: i = ITIS, c = Catalogue of Life, g = GBIF, b = BugGuide
