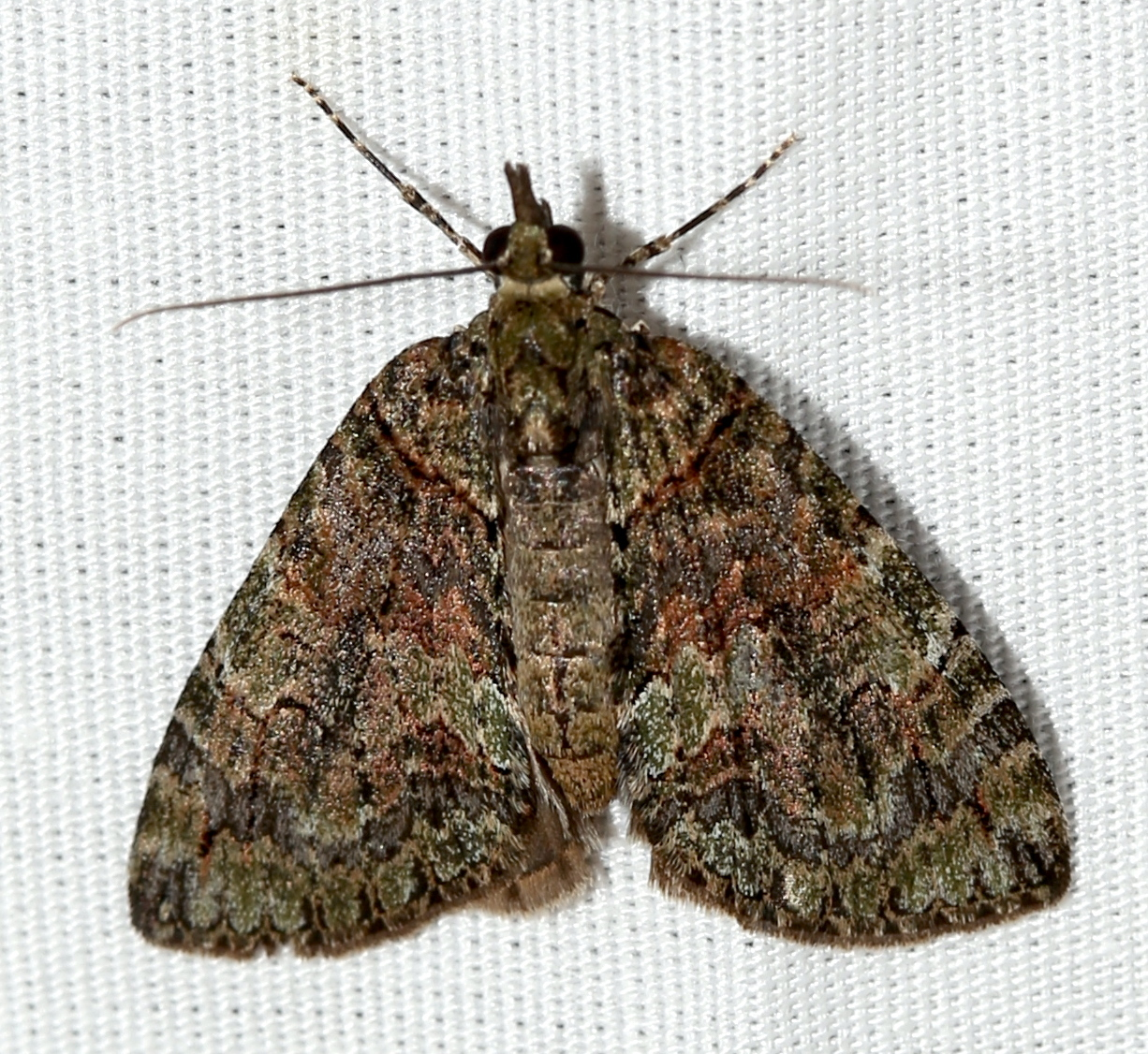

Scientific classification
- Kingdom: Animalia
- Phylum: Arthropoda
- Class: Insecta
- Order: Lepidoptera
- Family: Geometridae
- Tribe: Hydriomenini
- Genus: Hydriomena
- Species: H. pluviata

Binomial name
- Hydriomena pluviata (Guenée in Boisduval & Guenée, 1858)

= Hydriomena pluviata =

Species of moth

Hydriomena pluviata, the sharp green hydriomena moth, is a species of geometrid moth in the family Geometridae. It is found in North America.

The MONA or Hodges number for Hydriomena pluviata is 7239.

== Subspecies ==
These two subspecies belong to the species Hydriomena pluviata:

- Hydriomena pluviata meridianata McDunnough, 1954
- Hydriomena pluviata pluviata
