= Hydriomena costipunctata =

Scientific classification
- Kingdom: Animalia
- Phylum: Arthropoda
- Class: Insecta
- Order: Lepidoptera
- Family: Geometridae
- Genus: Hydriomena
- Species: H. costipunctata

Binomial name
- Hydriomena costipunctata Barnes & McDunnough, 1912

Species of moth

Hydriomena costipunctata is a species of moth in the family Geometridae first described by William Barnes and James Halliday McDunnough in 1912. It is found in North America.

The MONA or Hodges number for Hydriomena costipunctata is 7260.
