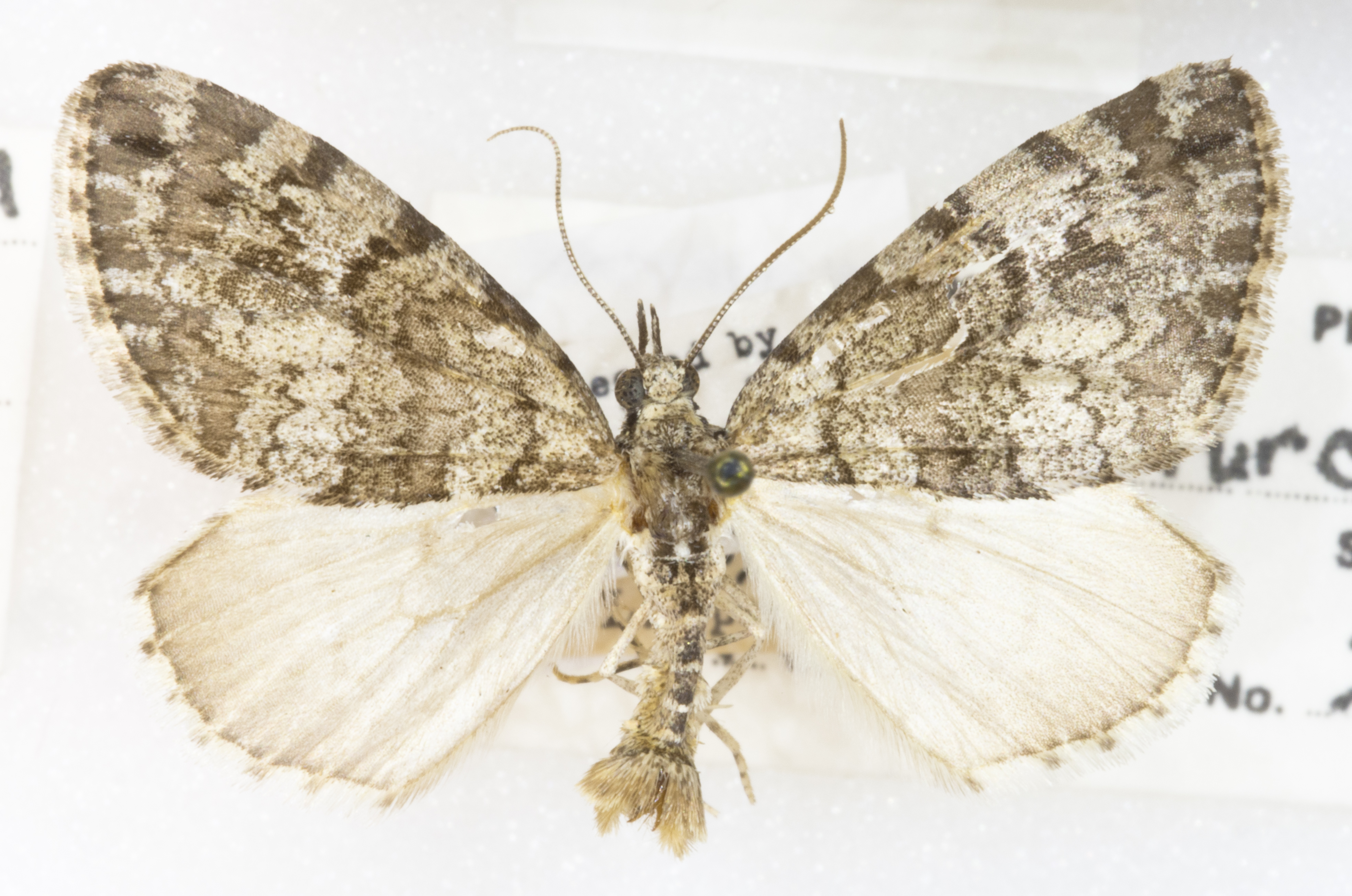

Scientific classification
- Kingdom: Animalia
- Phylum: Arthropoda
- Class: Insecta
- Order: Lepidoptera
- Family: Geometridae
- Genus: Hydriomena
- Species: H. furculoides

Binomial name
- Hydriomena furculoides Barnes & McDunnough, 1917

= Hydriomena furculoides =

Species of moth

Hydriomena furculoides is a species of moth in the family Geometridae first described by William Barnes and James Halliday McDunnough in 1917. It is found in North America.

The MONA or Hodges number for Hydriomena furculoides is 7273.
