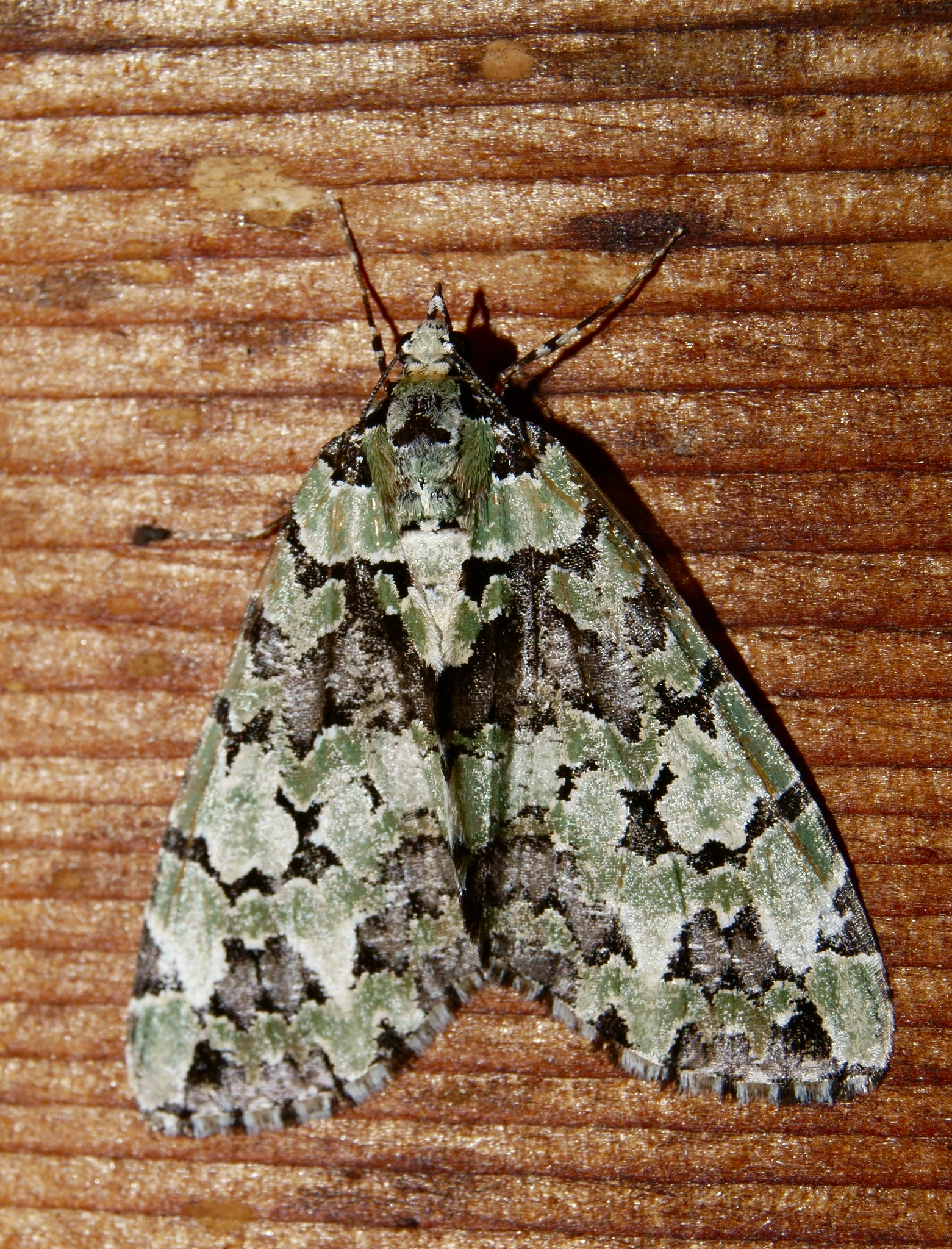

Scientific classification
- Domain: Eukaryota
- Kingdom: Animalia
- Phylum: Arthropoda
- Class: Insecta
- Order: Lepidoptera
- Family: Geometridae
- Genus: Hydriomena
- Species: H. magnificata

Binomial name
- Hydriomena magnificata Taylor, 1906

= Hydriomena magnificata =

Species of moth

Hydriomena magnificata, the magnificent highflier, is a species of geometrid moth in the family Geometridae. It is found in North America.
