= Hydriomena nevadae =

Scientific classification
- Kingdom: Animalia
- Phylum: Arthropoda
- Class: Insecta
- Order: Lepidoptera
- Family: Geometridae
- Genus: Hydriomena
- Species: H. nevadae

Binomial name
- Hydriomena nevadae Barnes & McDunnough, 1917

Species of moth

Hydriomena nevadae is a species of moth in the family Geometridae first described by William Barnes and James Halliday McDunnough in 1917. It is found in North America.

The MONA or Hodges number for Hydriomena nevadae is 7245.
