= Hydriomena bistriolata =

Scientific classification
- Kingdom: Animalia
- Phylum: Arthropoda
- Clade: Pancrustacea
- Class: Insecta
- Order: Lepidoptera
- Family: Geometridae
- Genus: Hydriomena
- Species: H. bistriolata

Binomial name
- Hydriomena bistriolata (Zeller, 1872)

Synonyms
- Cidaria bistriolata Zeller, 1872

Species of moth

Hydriomena bistriolata is a species of geometrid moth in the family Geometridae. It is found in North America.

The MONA or Hodges number for Hydriomena bistriolata is 7238.

== Subspecies ==
These two subspecies belong to the species Hydriomena bistriolata:

- Hydriomena bistriolata bistriolata
- Hydriomena bistriolata modestata Barnes & McDunnough
