= Hydriomena catalinata =

Scientific classification
- Kingdom: Animalia
- Phylum: Arthropoda
- Clade: Pancrustacea
- Class: Insecta
- Order: Lepidoptera
- Family: Geometridae
- Genus: Hydriomena
- Species: H. catalinata

Binomial name
- Hydriomena catalinata McDunnough, 1943

Species of moth

Hydriomena catalinata is a moth in the family Geometridae. It is found in the southern United States, including Arizona and New Mexico.

The wingspan is about 38 mm. Adults have been recorded on wing in April and June.
