= Hydriomena crokeri =

Scientific classification
- Kingdom: Animalia
- Phylum: Arthropoda
- Class: Insecta
- Order: Lepidoptera
- Family: Geometridae
- Tribe: Hydriomenini
- Genus: Hydriomena
- Species: H. crokeri

Binomial name
- Hydriomena crokeri Swett, 1910

Species of moth

Hydriomena crokeri is a species of geometrid moth in the family Geometridae. It is found in North America.

The MONA or Hodges number for Hydriomena crokeri is 7247.
