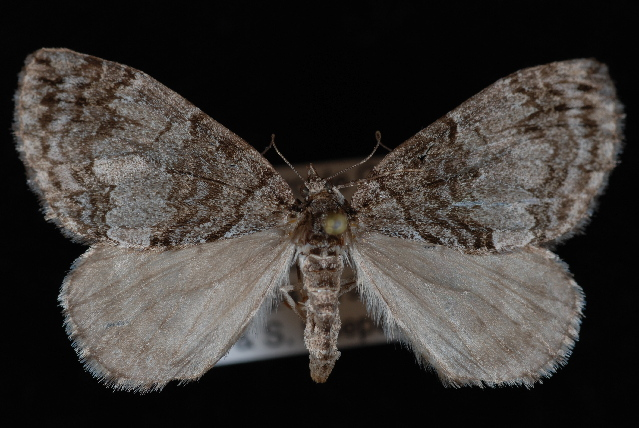

Scientific classification
- Kingdom: Animalia
- Phylum: Arthropoda
- Clade: Pancrustacea
- Class: Insecta
- Order: Lepidoptera
- Family: Geometridae
- Tribe: Hydriomenini
- Genus: Hydriomena
- Species: H. renunciata

Binomial name
- Hydriomena renunciata (Walker, 1862)

= Hydriomena renunciata =

Species of moth

Hydriomena renunciata, the renounced hydriomena, is a species of geometrid moth in the family Geometridae. It is found in North America.

The MONA or Hodges number for Hydriomena renunciata is 7236.

The larvae are dirt brown with tan stripes. The caterpillars fashion a shelter by folding over a leaf edge or securing together two overlapping leaves. There is one generation of mature caterpillars from July into October. The host plant is Alder.

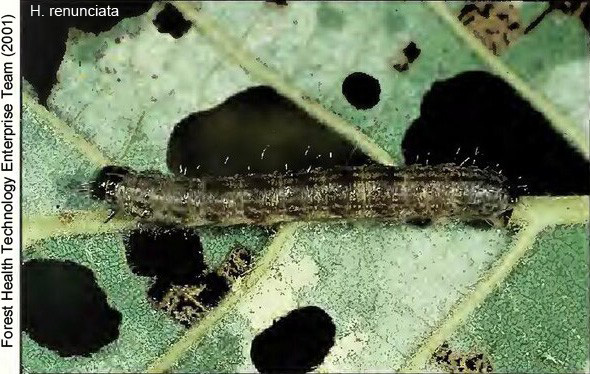
Hydriomena renunciata caterpillar

== Subspecies ==
These four subspecies belong to the species Hydriomena renunciata:

- Hydriomena renunciata columbiata Taylor, 1906
- Hydriomena renunciata pernigrata Barnes & McDunnough, 1917
- Hydriomena renunciata renunciata
- Hydriomena renunciata viridescens McDunnough, 1954
