= Hydriomena quinquefasciata =

Scientific classification
- Kingdom: Animalia
- Phylum: Arthropoda
- Clade: Pancrustacea
- Class: Insecta
- Order: Lepidoptera
- Family: Geometridae
- Genus: Hydriomena
- Species: H. quinquefasciata

Binomial name
- Hydriomena quinquefasciata (Packard, 1871)

Species of moth

Hydriomena quinquefasciata is a species of geometrid moth in the family Geometridae. It is found in North America.

The MONA or Hodges number for Hydriomena quinquefasciata is 7258.
