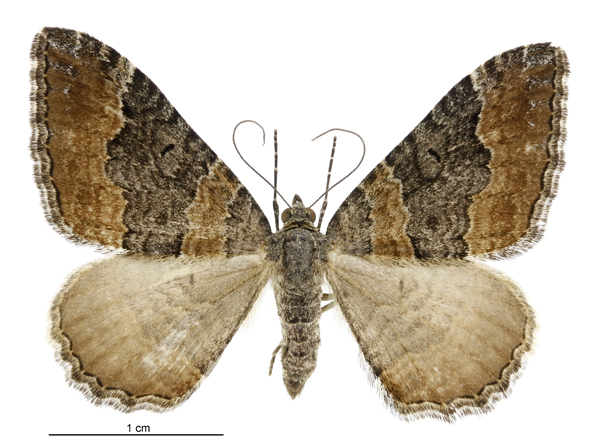
- Female
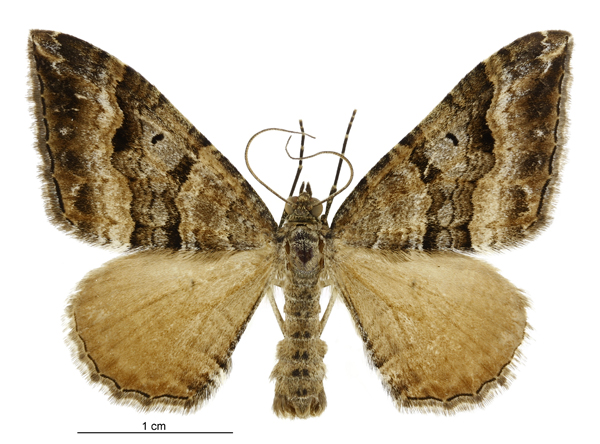
- Male

Scientific classification
- Kingdom: Animalia
- Phylum: Arthropoda
- Clade: Pancrustacea
- Class: Insecta
- Order: Lepidoptera
- Family: Geometridae
- Genus: Hydriomena
- Species: H. deltoidata

Binomial name
- Hydriomena deltoidata (Walker, 1862)

Synonyms
- Coremia deltoidea Walker, 1862; Cidaria inclarata Walker, 1862; Cidaria perductata Walker, 1862; Cidaria congressata Walker, 1862; Cidaria conversata Walker, 1862; Cidaria descriptata Walker, 1862; Cidaria bisignata Walker, 1862; Cidaria congregate Walker, 1862; Cidaria aggregate Walker, 1862; Cidaria plagifurcata Walker, 1862; Coremia pastinaria Guenée, 1868; Cidaria inopiata Felder & Rogenhofer, 1875; Cidaria monoliata Felder & Rogenhofer, 1875; Cidaria perversata Felder & Rogenhofer, 1875; Hydriomena deltoidata hawthornei Thierry-Mieg, 1915

= Hydriomena deltoidata =

Species of moth endemic to New Zealand

Hydriomena deltoidata is a species of moth in the family Geometridae. It was first described by Francis Walker in 1862. This species is endemic to New Zealand.

== Taxonomy ==
This species is was first described by Francis Walker in 1862 using a specimen collected in Nelson by T. R. Oxley and was originally named Coremia deltoidea. H. deltoidata was discussed and illustrated by George Hudson in his 1928 book The butterflies and moths of New Zealand.

The classification of New Zealand endemic moths within the genus Hydriomena is regarded as unsatisfactory and in need of revision. As such this species is currently also known as Hydriomena (s.l.) deltoidata. The male lectotype, collected in Auckland, is held in the Natural History Museum, London.

== Description ==
Hudson described the adults of this species as follows:

The expansion of the wings varies from 1 1/4 to 1 1/2 inches. The fore-wings vary from brownish-black to dull orange-brown; there is a small darker area near the base, followed by two whitish wavy transverse lines, then a broad darker central band, often containing within it a narrower band, bounded by two wavy black transverse lines; beyond the central band there are nearly always two or three pale brown or whitish lines, an interrupted subterminal line, and a short oblique whitish line below the apex; there is a black discal dot and a white dot on the termen near the middle. The hind-wings are yellowish-brown, with several wavy, transverse lines near the dorsum; there is a series of fine crescentic black lines on the termen of both fore- and hind-wings.

== Distribution ==
This species is endemic to New Zealand.

== Behaviour ==
The adults of this moth are known to pollinate Dracophyllum acerosum and Leptospermum scoparium.
