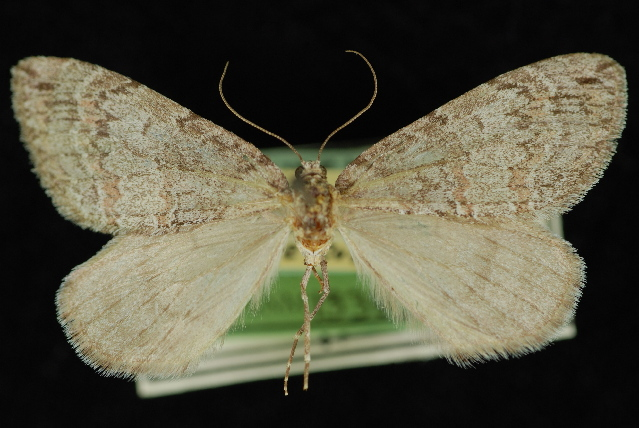

Scientific classification
- Kingdom: Animalia
- Phylum: Arthropoda
- Class: Insecta
- Order: Lepidoptera
- Family: Geometridae
- Genus: Hydriomena
- Species: H. expurgata

Binomial name
- Hydriomena expurgata Barnes & McDunnough, 1918

= Hydriomena expurgata =

Species of moth

Hydriomena expurgata is a species of moth in the family Geometridae first described by William Barnes and James Halliday McDunnough in 1918. It is found in North America.

The MONA or Hodges number for Hydriomena expurgata is 7224.

== Subspecies ==
Four subspecies belong to Hydriomena expurgata:

- Hydriomena expurgata alticola McDunnough, 1954^{c g}
- Hydriomena expurgata expurgata^{g}
- Hydriomena expurgata franclemonti McDunnough, 1952^{c g}
- Hydriomena expurgata nicolensis McDunnough, 1954^{c g}

Data sources: i = ITIS, c = Catalogue of Life, g = GBIF, b = BugGuide
