= Hydriomena macdunnoughi =

Scientific classification
- Kingdom: Animalia
- Phylum: Arthropoda
- Class: Insecta
- Order: Lepidoptera
- Family: Geometridae
- Genus: Hydriomena
- Species: H. macdunnoughi

Binomial name
- Hydriomena macdunnoughi Swett, 1918

Species of moth

Hydriomena macdunnoughi is a species of moth in the family Geometridae (geometrid moths). It was described by Louis W. Swett in 1918 and is found in North America, where it has been recorded from Yukon Territory to western Alberta and Colorado.

The wingspan is 14–16 mm. The forewings are dark ashen grey, with a broad, irregular fuscous band centrally. The hindwings are pale grey with six or seven indeterminate, brown, wavy, hair-lines crossing them. Adults have been recorded on wing from April to July.

The larvae feed on Salix species.

The MONA or Hodges number for Hydriomena macdunnoughi is 7255.
