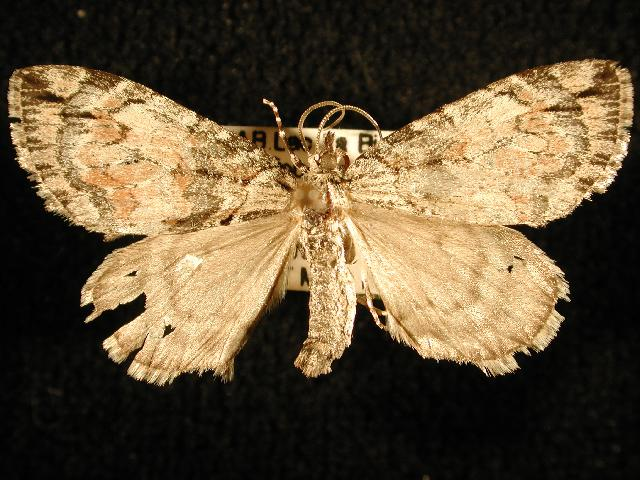

Scientific classification
- Kingdom: Animalia
- Phylum: Arthropoda
- Class: Insecta
- Order: Lepidoptera
- Family: Geometridae
- Genus: Hydriomena
- Species: H. perfracta

Binomial name
- Hydriomena perfracta Swett, 1910

= Hydriomena perfracta =

Species of moth

Hydriomena perfracta, the shattered hydriomena, is a species of geometrid moth in the family Geometridae. It is found in North America.

The MONA or Hodges number for Hydriomena perfracta is 7229.
