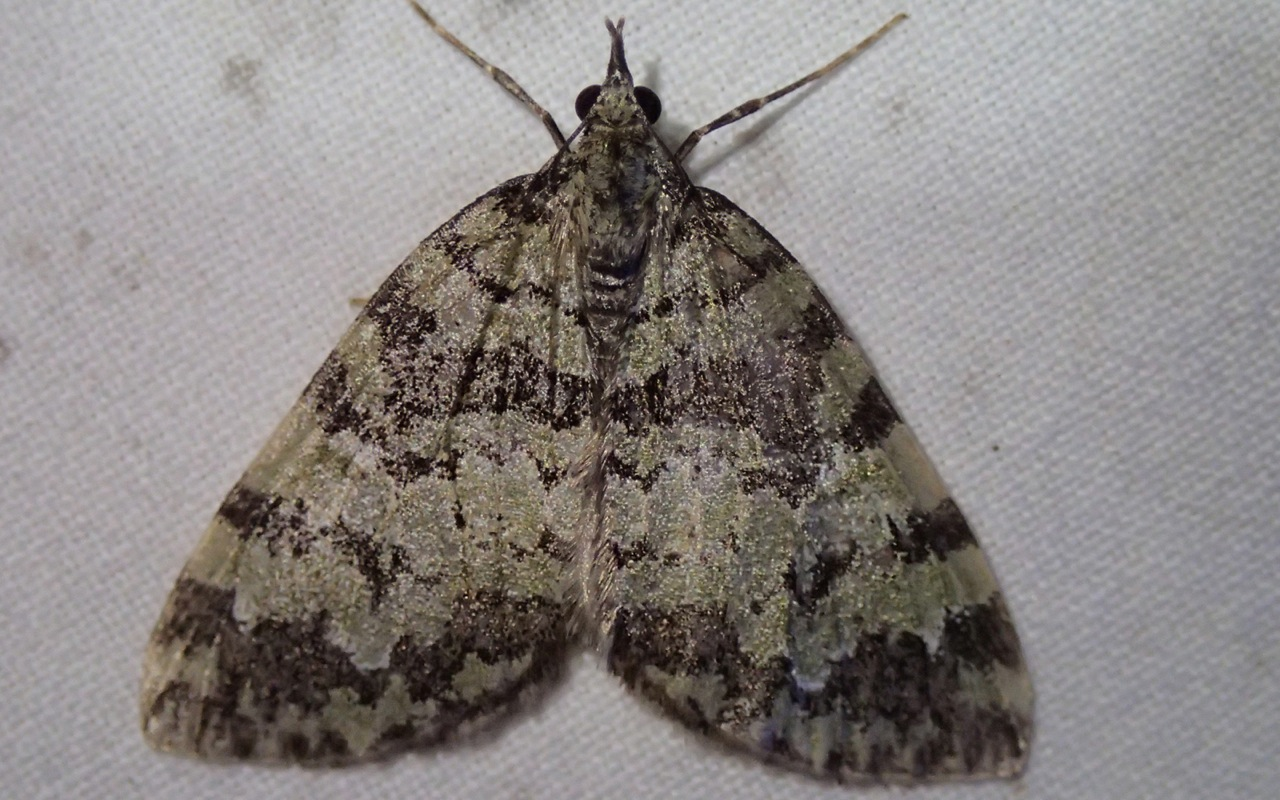

Scientific classification
- Kingdom: Animalia
- Phylum: Arthropoda
- Clade: Pancrustacea
- Class: Insecta
- Order: Lepidoptera
- Family: Geometridae
- Genus: Hydriomena
- Species: H. speciosata

Binomial name
- Hydriomena speciosata (Packard, 1874)

Synonyms
- Hypsipetes speciosata Packard, 1874; Hydriomena agassizi Swett, 1910; Hydriomena ameliata Swett, 1915; Hydriomena taylori Swett, 1910

= Hydriomena speciosata =

Species of moth

Hydriomena speciosata is a moth of the family Geometridae. It is found from coastal British Columbia south to California. The habitat consists of wet conifer forests.

The wingspan is about 36 mm. The forewings have alternating bands of green and black. Adults are on wing in midsummer.

The larvae feed on the foliage of Pinaceae species, including Abies grandis, Picea, Pinus, Pseudotsuga menziesii and Tsuga heterophylla. Mature larvae reach a length of 20 mm. Pupation takes place in May or June.
