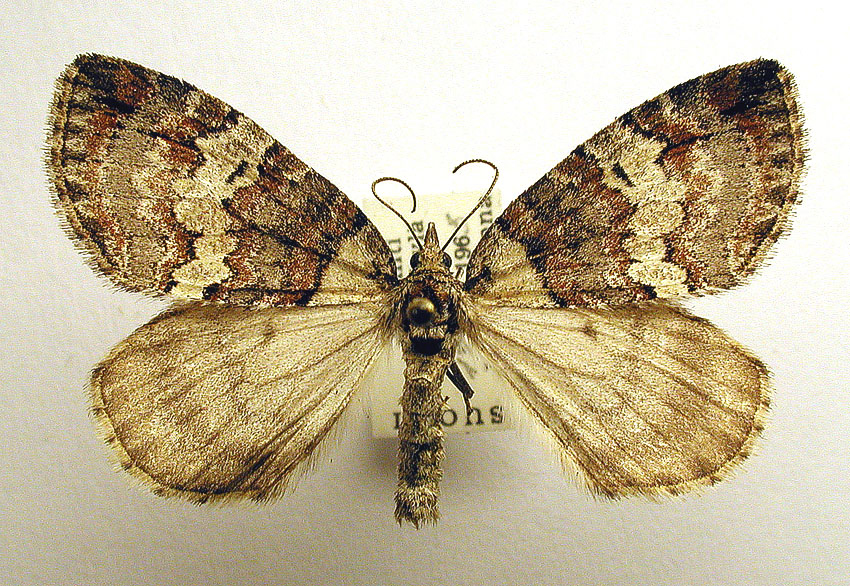

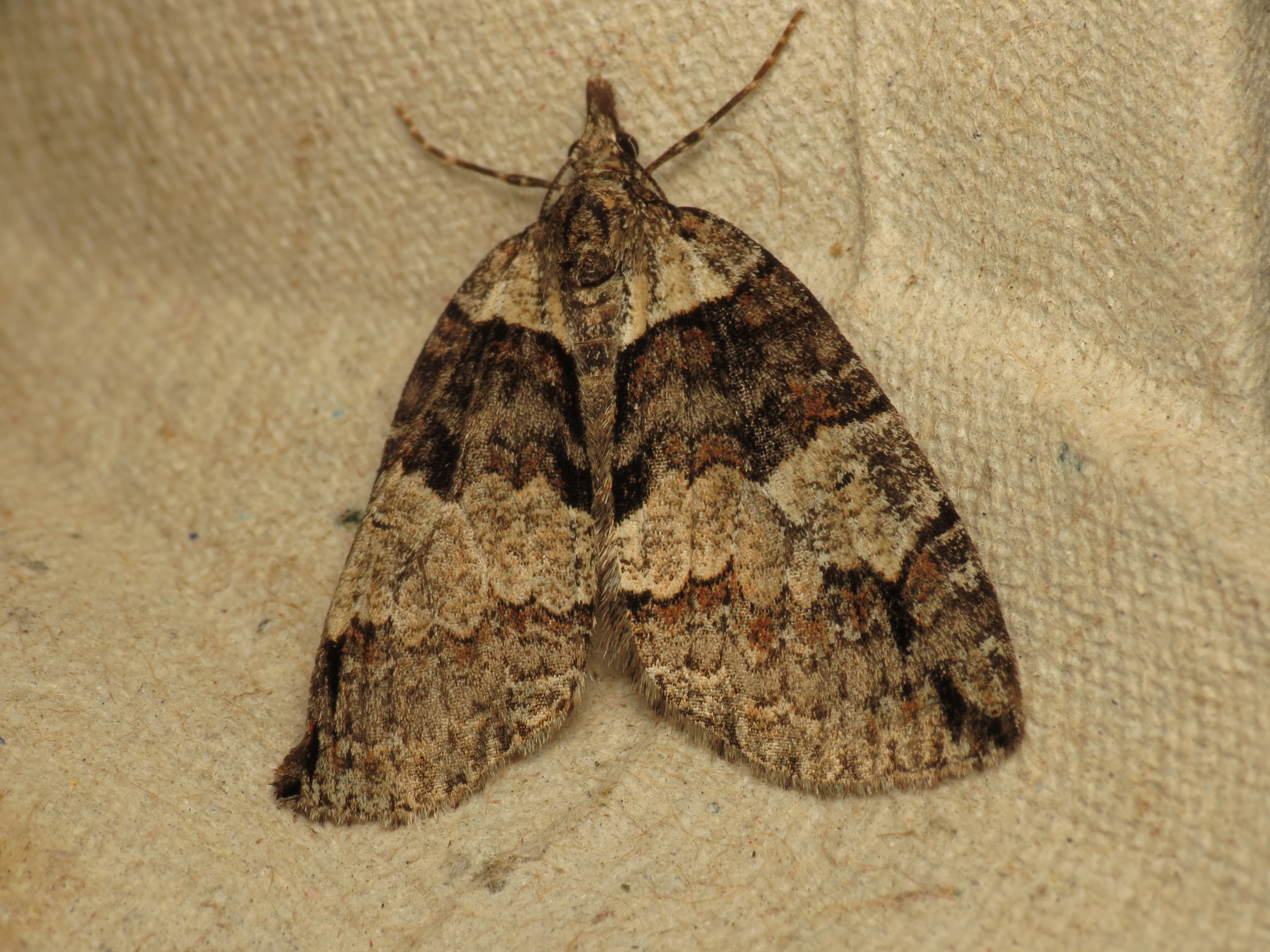

Scientific classification
- Kingdom: Animalia
- Phylum: Arthropoda
- Class: Insecta
- Order: Lepidoptera
- Family: Geometridae
- Genus: Hydriomena
- Species: H. ruberata

Binomial name
- Hydriomena ruberata (Freyer, 1831)

Synonyms
- Acidalia ruberata Freyer, 1831; Hydriomena ruberata f. variegata (Prout, 1914) (form)

= Hydriomena ruberata =

Species of moth

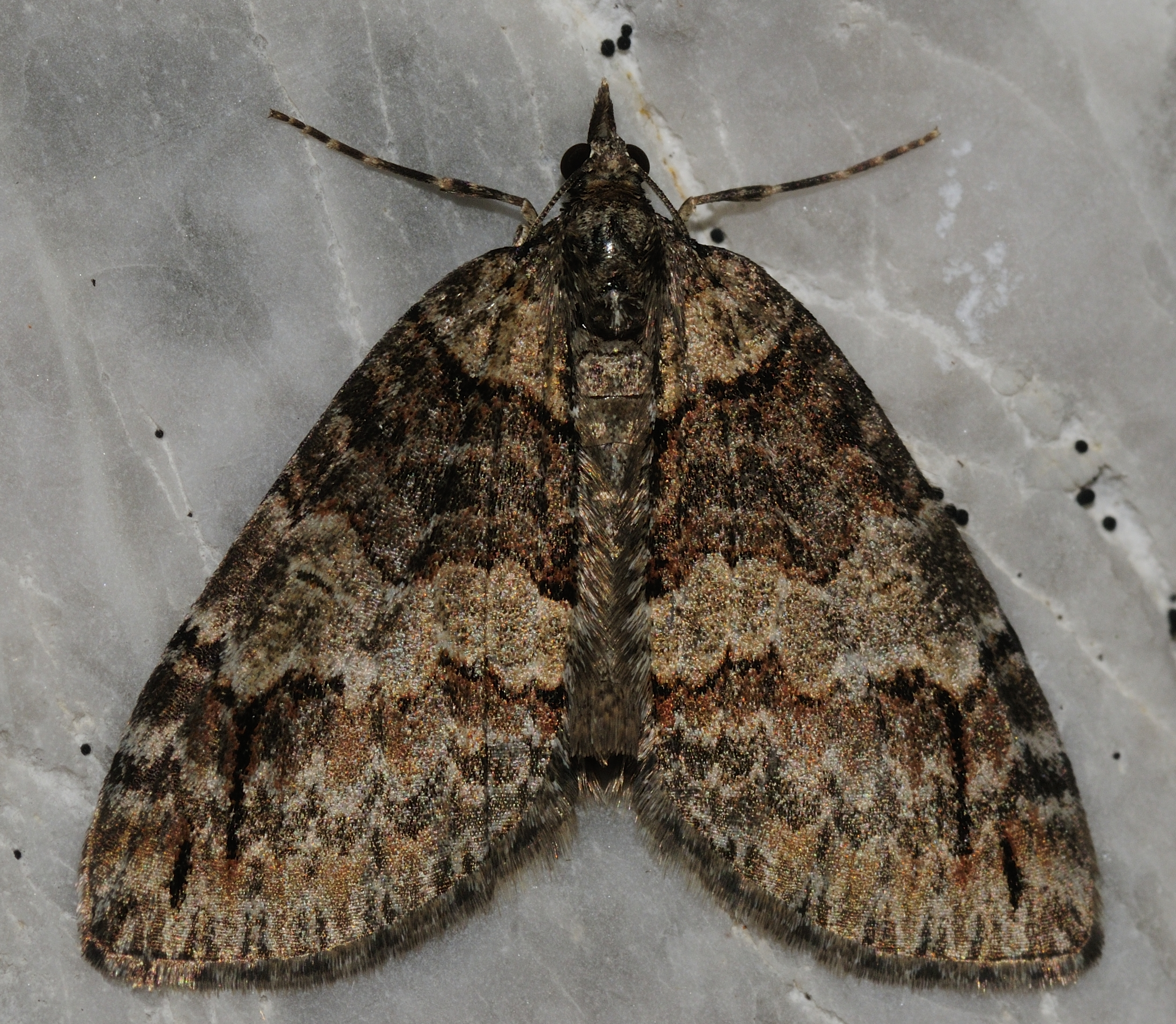
Hydriomena ruberata

Hydriomena ruberata, the ruddy highflyer, is a moth of the family Geometridae. The species was first described by Christian Friedrich Freyer in 1831. It is found from Ireland and Great Britain east to north-western Russia, and south up to the Alps. It is also present in North America.

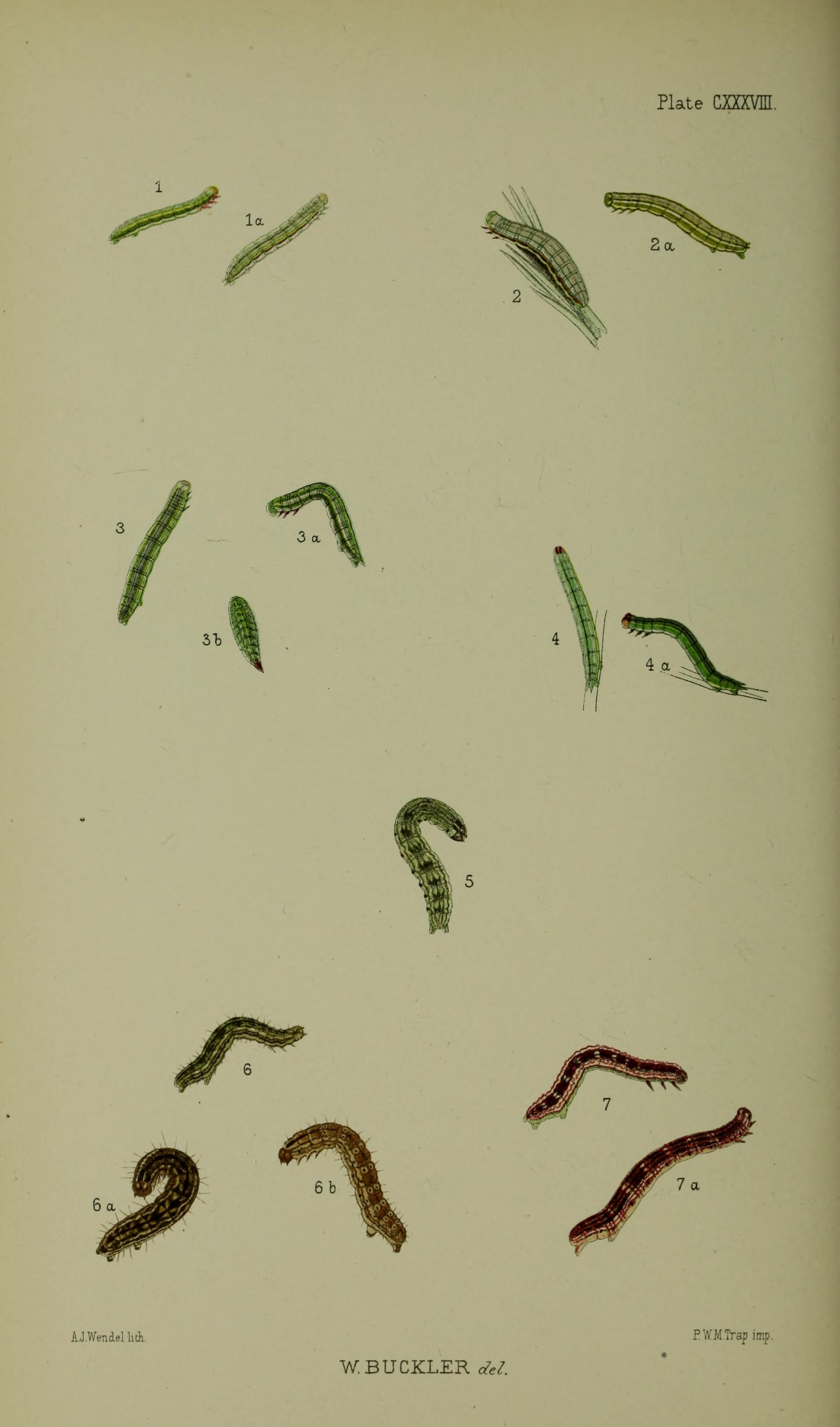
Figs Fig. 5 larvae after final moult

The wingspan is 29–37 mm. It is very similar to Hydriomena impluviata. It is "distinguishable from the preceding species [Hydriomena impluviata] by the characters noted above (qv.) and the greater prevalence of reddish or rust-coloured tone. Subbasal line variable, often strongly angled in the cell, sometimes thickened at the angle and again at the hindmargin; antemedian rust-coloured band often ending in a conspicuous black spot at hindmargin;in the distal area the black line on the first radial is generally strong, those on the 5th subcostal second radial rarely so; black apical streak generally conspicuous. The name-type is grey, sharply marked, with the rust colour reduced to 4 narrow, inconspicuous bands.The larva is relatively powerful with a few short bristles, light reddish grey-brown in colour.

There is one generation per year, with adults on wing from mid-May to July.

The larvae feed on Salix species (including S. phylicifolia and S. aurita). Larvae can be found from June to September. It overwinters as a pupa.
