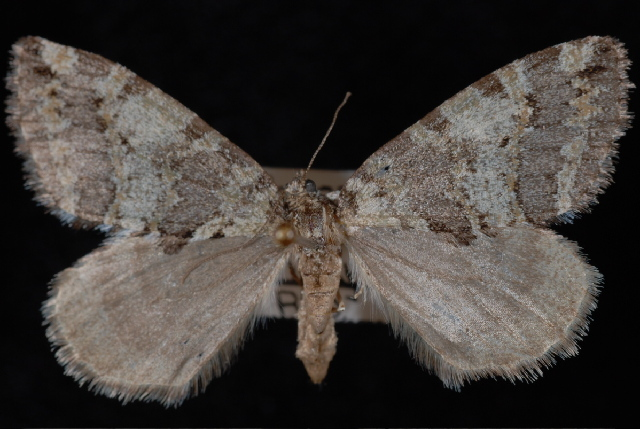

Scientific classification
- Kingdom: Animalia
- Phylum: Arthropoda
- Clade: Pancrustacea
- Class: Insecta
- Order: Lepidoptera
- Family: Geometridae
- Genus: Hydriomena
- Species: H. nubilofasciata

Binomial name
- Hydriomena nubilofasciata (Packard, 1871)

= Hydriomena nubilofasciata =

Species of moth

Hydriomena nubilofasciata, the oak winter highflier, is a species of geometrid moth in the family Geometridae. It is found in North America. The adults reach a wingspan of 24–30 mm and appear around oaks in late January and February.

The MONA or Hodges number for Hydriomena nubilofasciata is 7276.
