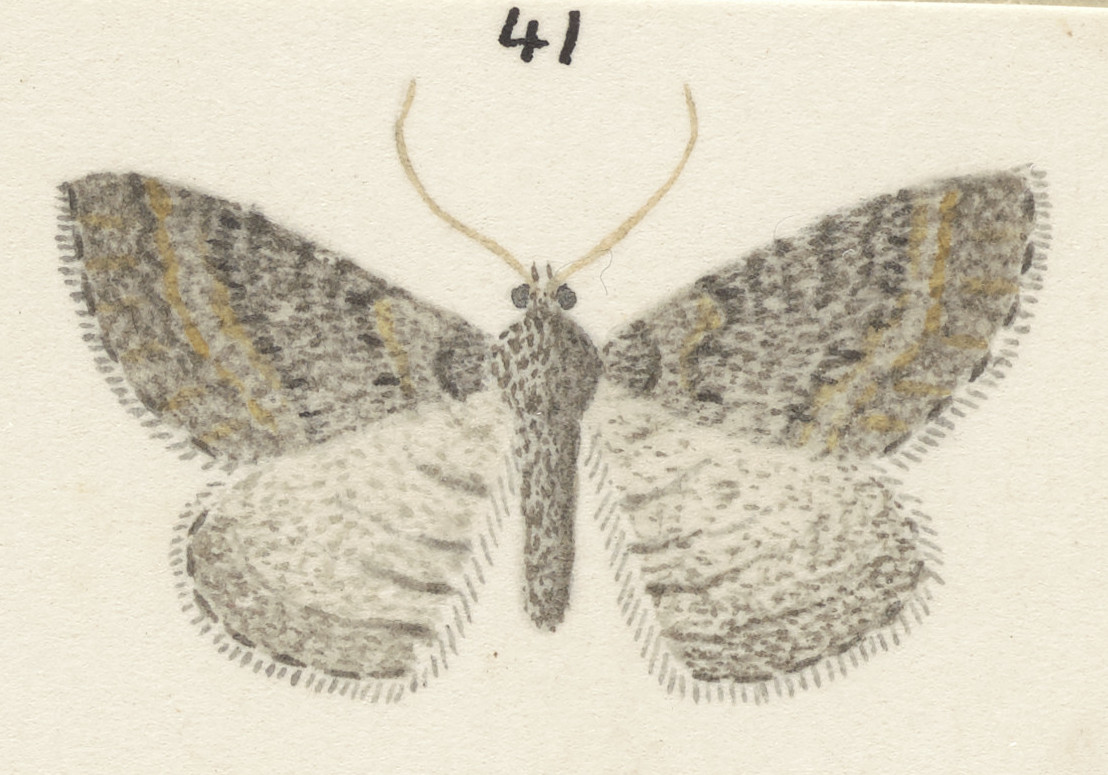
- Illustration of male

Scientific classification
- Kingdom: Animalia
- Phylum: Arthropoda
- Class: Insecta
- Order: Lepidoptera
- Family: Geometridae
- Genus: Hydriomena
- Species: H. canescens

Binomial name
- Hydriomena canescens Philpott, 1918

= Hydriomena canescens =

Species of moth endemic to New Zealand

Hydriomena canescens is a species of moth in the family Geometridae. It was first described by Alfred Philpott in 1918. This species is endemic to New Zealand. The classification of New Zealand endemic moths within the genus Hydriomena is regarded as unsatisfactory and in need of revision. As such this species is currently also known as Hydriomena (s.l.) canescens.
