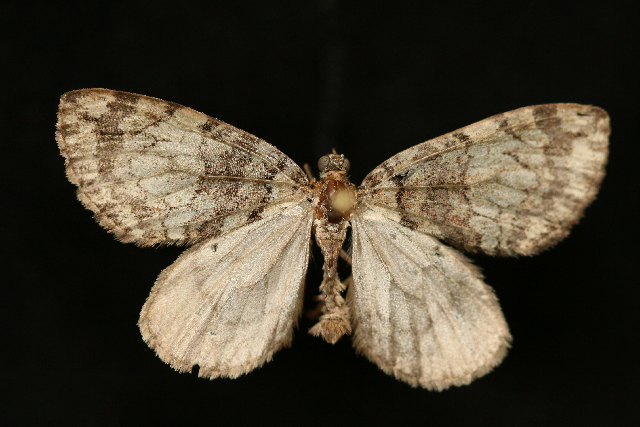

Scientific classification
- Kingdom: Animalia
- Phylum: Arthropoda
- Class: Insecta
- Order: Lepidoptera
- Family: Geometridae
- Genus: Hydriomena
- Species: H. marinata

Binomial name
- Hydriomena marinata Barnes & McDunnough, 1917

= Hydriomena marinata =

Species of moth

Hydriomena marinata is a species of moth in the family Geometridae first described by William Barnes and James Halliday McDunnough in 1917. It is generally found in North America.

The MONA or Hodges number for Hydriomena marinata is 7231.

== Subspecies ==
Two subspecies belong to Hydriomena marinata:

- Hydriomena marinata exasperata Barnes & McDunnough, 1917^{c g}
- Hydriomena marinata marinata^{g}

Data sources: i = ITIS, c = Catalogue of Life, g = GBIF, b = BugGuide
