= Hydriomena mississippiensis =

Scientific classification
- Kingdom: Animalia
- Phylum: Arthropoda
- Clade: Pancrustacea
- Class: Insecta
- Order: Lepidoptera
- Family: Geometridae
- Tribe: Hydriomenini
- Genus: Hydriomena
- Species: H. mississippiensis

Binomial name
- Hydriomena mississippiensis McDunnough, 1952

Species of moth

Hydriomena mississippiensis is a species of geometrid moth in the family Geometridae. It is found in North America.

The MONA or Hodges number for Hydriomena mississippiensis is 7252.
