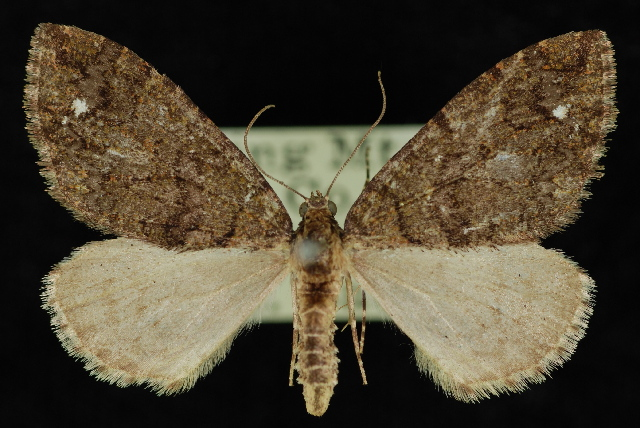

Scientific classification
- Kingdom: Animalia
- Phylum: Arthropoda
- Clade: Pancrustacea
- Class: Insecta
- Order: Lepidoptera
- Family: Geometridae
- Genus: Hydriomena
- Species: H. albifasciata

Binomial name
- Hydriomena albifasciata (Packard, 1874)

= Hydriomena albifasciata =

Species of moth

Hydriomena albifasciata is a species of geometrid moth in the family Geometridae. It is found in North America.

The MONA or Hodges number for Hydriomena albifasciata is 7261.

== Subspecies ==
These four subspecies belong to the species Hydriomena albifasciata:

- Hydriomena albifasciata albifasciata
- Hydriomena albifasciata puncticaudata Barnes & McDunnough
- Hydriomena albifasciata reflata Grote, 1882
- Hydriomena albifasciata victoria Barnes & McDunnough, 1917
