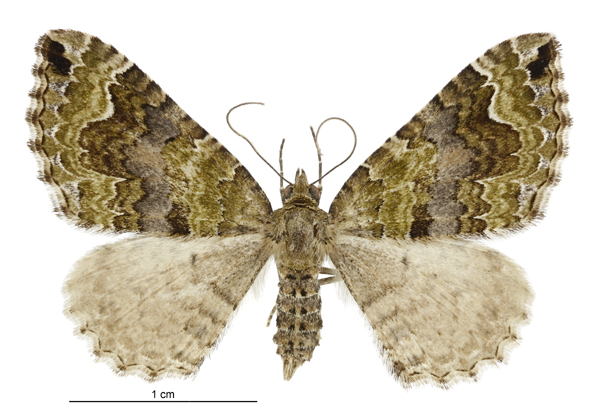
- Female
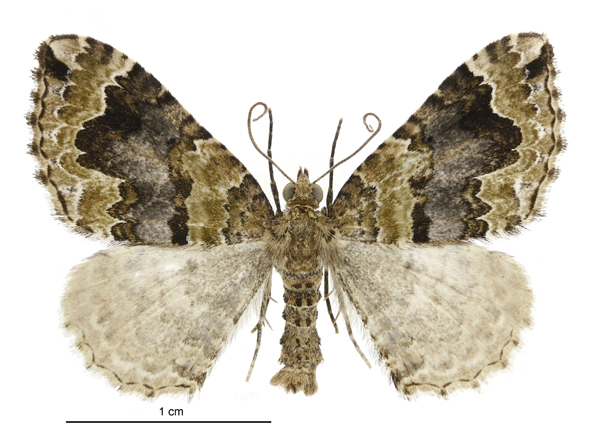
- Male

Scientific classification
- Kingdom: Animalia
- Phylum: Arthropoda
- Clade: Pancrustacea
- Class: Insecta
- Order: Lepidoptera
- Family: Geometridae
- Genus: Hydriomena
- Species: H. rixata

Binomial name
- Hydriomena rixata (Felder & Rogenhofer, 1875)

Synonyms
- Cidaria rixata Felder & Rogenhofer, 1875; Cidaria squalida Butler, 1879; Euphyia rixata (Felder & Rogenhofer, 1875); Euphyia rixata liara Prout, 1939

= Hydriomena rixata =

Species of moth endemic to New Zealand

Hydriomena rixata is a species of moth in the family Geometridae. It was first described in 1875. This species is endemic to New Zealand. The classification of New Zealand endemic moths within the genus Hydriomena is regarded as unsatisfactory and in need of revision. As such this species is currently also known as Hydriomena (s.l.) rixata. The adults of this moth are known to pollinate Dracophyllum acerosum.

Adults are attracted to light and have been collected via a mercury vapour light trap.
