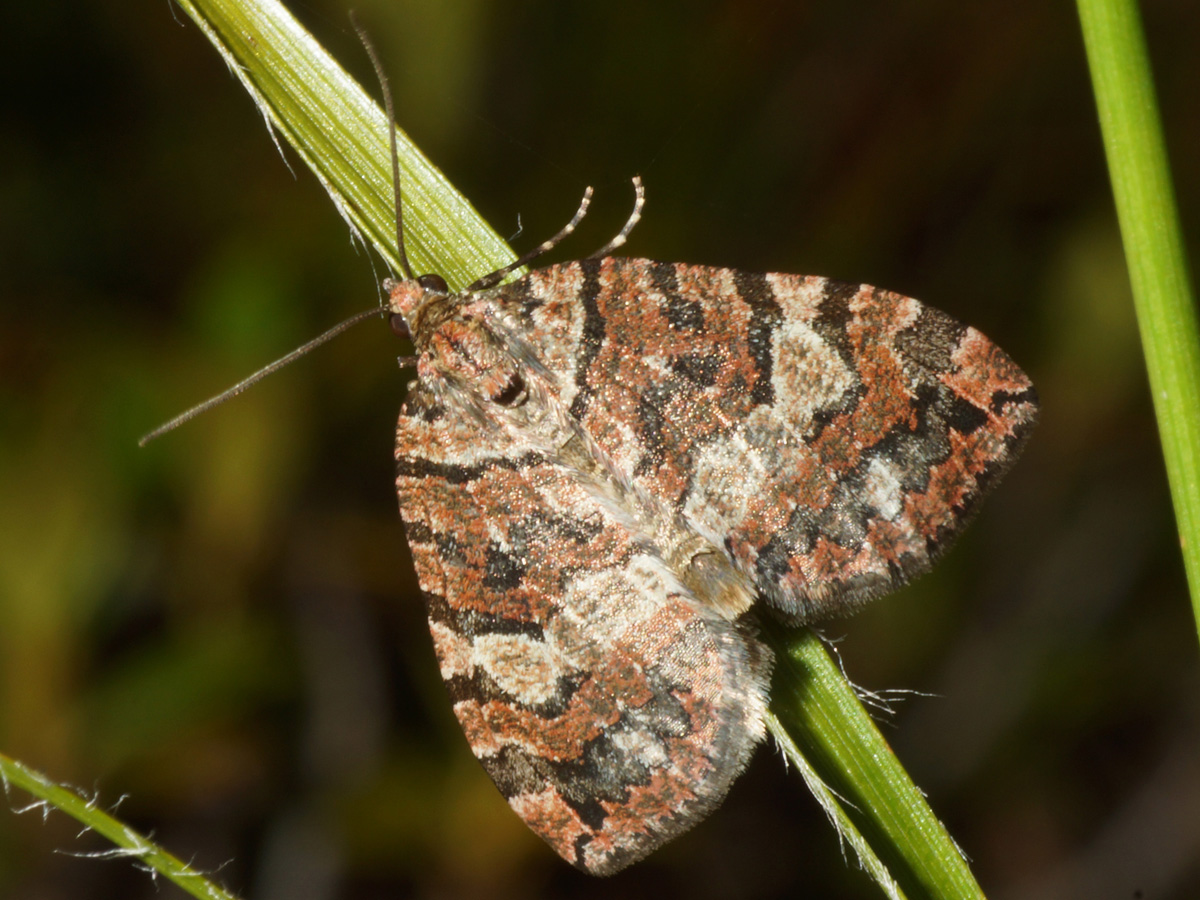
- Hydriomena furcata. Dorsal view
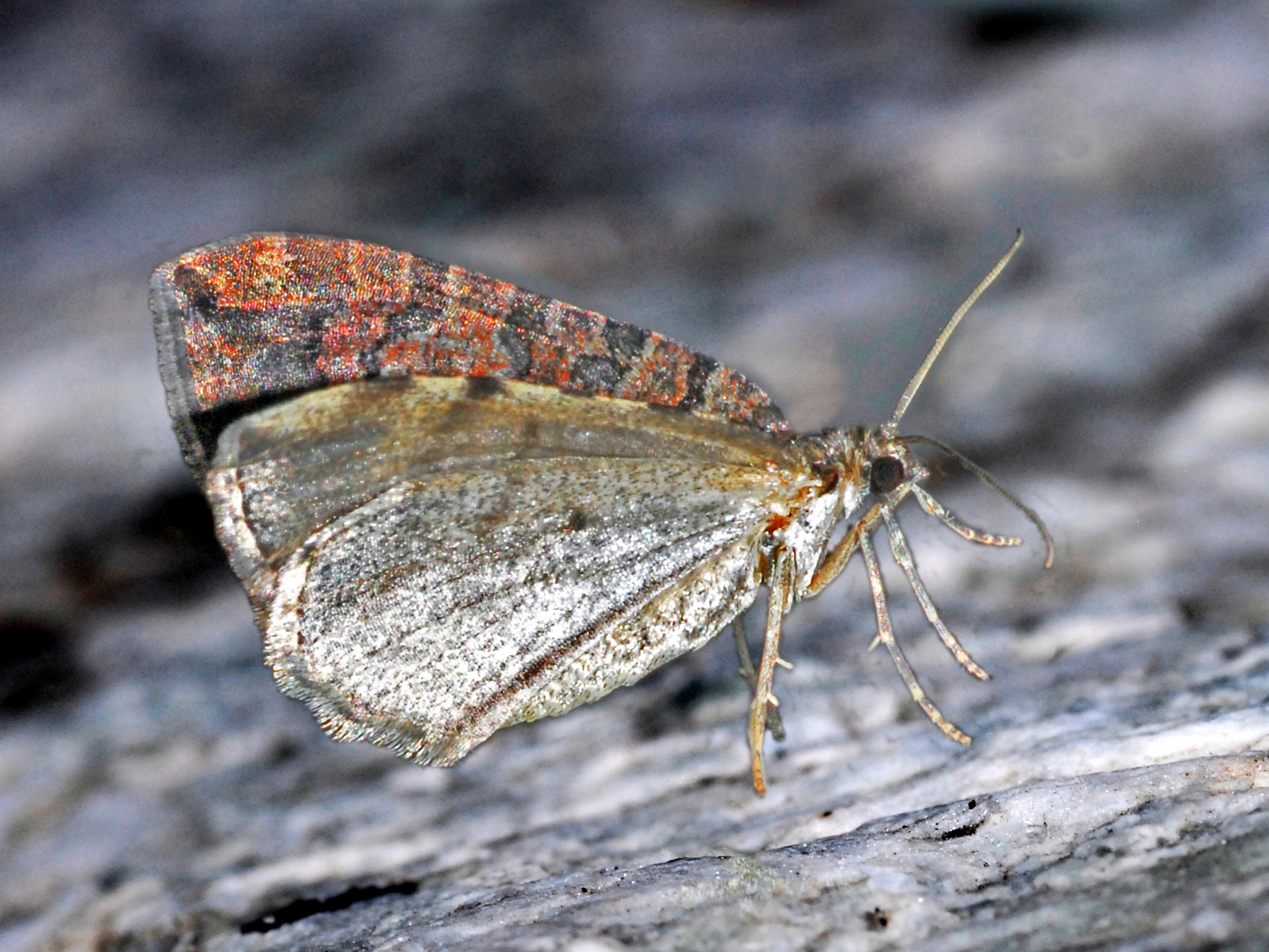
- Side view

Scientific classification
- Kingdom: Animalia
- Phylum: Arthropoda
- Clade: Pancrustacea
- Class: Insecta
- Order: Lepidoptera
- Family: Geometridae
- Genus: Hydriomena
- Species: H. furcata

Binomial name
- Hydriomena furcata (Thunberg, 1784)

Synonyms
- Hydriomena sordidata; Hydriomena elutata; Hydriomena fuscoundata; Hydriomena elutaria

= Hydriomena furcata =

Species of moth

Hydriomena furcata, the July highflyer, is a moth of the family Geometridae. The species was first described by Carl Peter Thunberg in 1784. It is found in the Holarctic ecozone.

== Subspecies ==
Subspecies include:

- Hydriomena furcata furcata (Thunberg, 1784)
- Hydriomena furcata fergusoni McDunnough, 1954
- Hydriomena furcata saga (Prout, 1938)

== Distribution and habitat ==
This species can be found in Europe, the Caucasus, Transcaucasia, Urals, Kazakhstan, Siberia, Russian Far East, northern Mongolia, China, Korea, In North America, from Alaska to British Columbia and Newfoundland.

It is extremely abundant in northern Europe; in central Europe it becomes more local and in the south it is apparently almost lacking; in Siberia and central Asia it has a wide range. The preferred habitat is moorland areas of sub-alpine and montane regions, hedgerows and woodland margins.

== Description ==
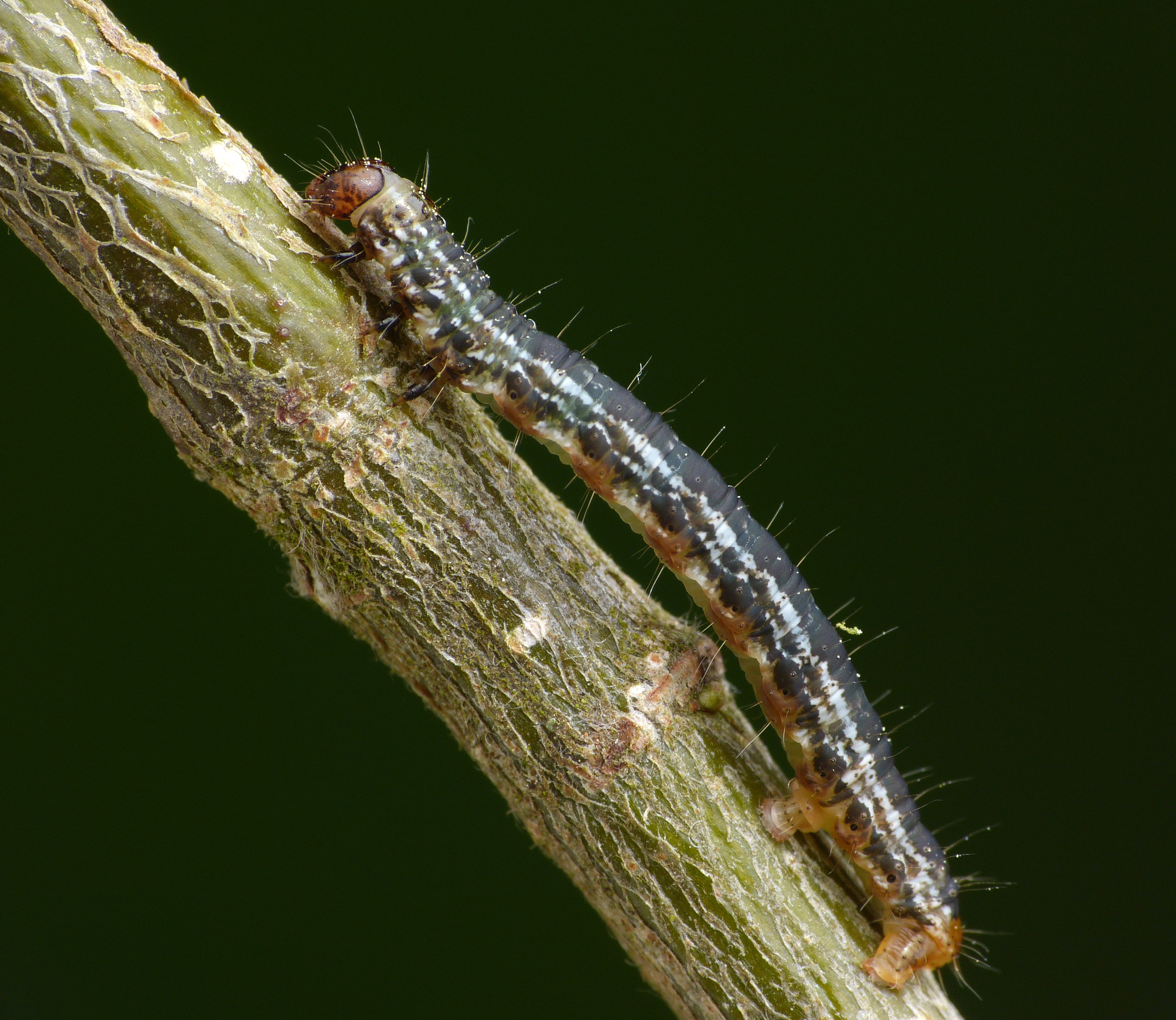
Caterpillar

Hydriomena furcata can reach a wingspan of 23–30 mm (0.91–1.18 in). These moths are very variable, both in markings as well as colour. The ground colour ranges from olive green to grey, greyish brown and reddish brown. Also the dark cross bands vary in intensity and pattern. The banding is reddish brown to blackish with whitish spots and dark speckles. There is anapical streak on the forewings. The hindwings are pale brown. The edge of the forewing is angled near the base.

It differs from the other European species of Hydriomena in the shorter palpus, the more angled or irregular markings between the subbasal line and the median space, dark subterminal band, nearly always interrupted by a white or pale spot in the middle, absence of black vein-streaks near the apex".

The caterpillars are dark grey on the dorsum and ventrally dark red and with white side stripes. The pupae are 10 to 14 millimeters long and 3 to 3.8 millimeters wide, they are reddish brown coloured and shiny. The proboscis sheath is a little shorter than the middle legs and antenna sheaths. The tenth abdominal segment is clearly curved, the labium medium in size. A safe distinction from related species is possible by means of the bristles on the cremaster

== Biology ==
Adults are on wing from May to August. There is one generation per year univoltine. The species overwinters as an egg. These moths are both diurnal and nocturnal and fly towards the light. The females usually lay their eggs in small groups on the underside of blueberry leaves (Vaccinium myrtillus). The larvae feed on various broad-leaved trees and shrubs, including goat willow Salix caprea, hazel (Corylus avellana), rose (Rosa sp.), aspen (Populus tremula) and Vaccinium myrtillus.

== Variability of Hydriomena furcata ==
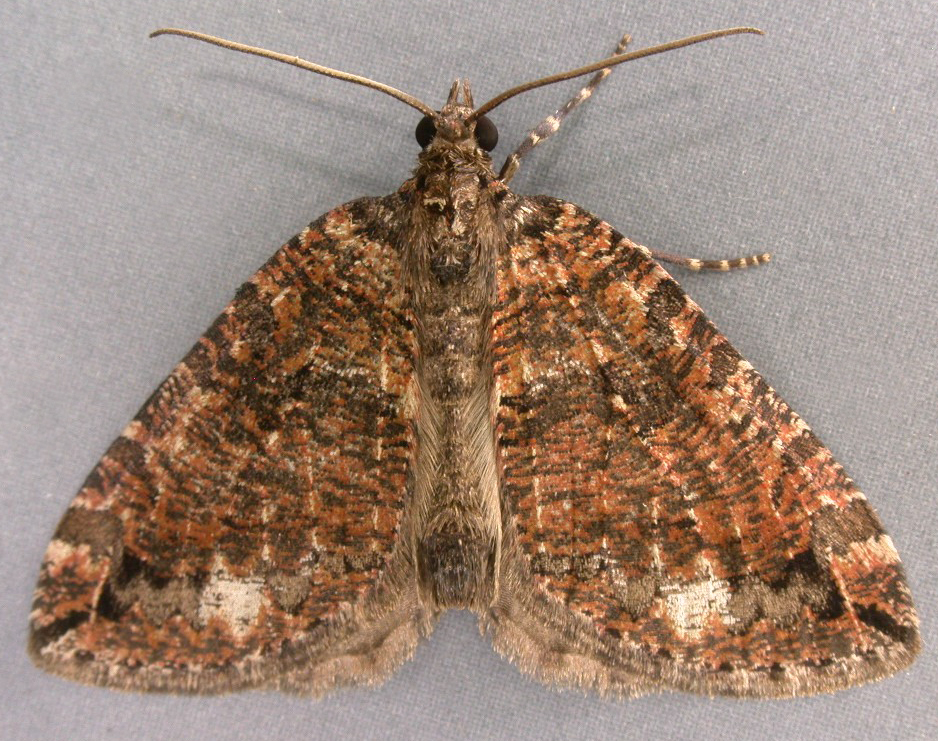

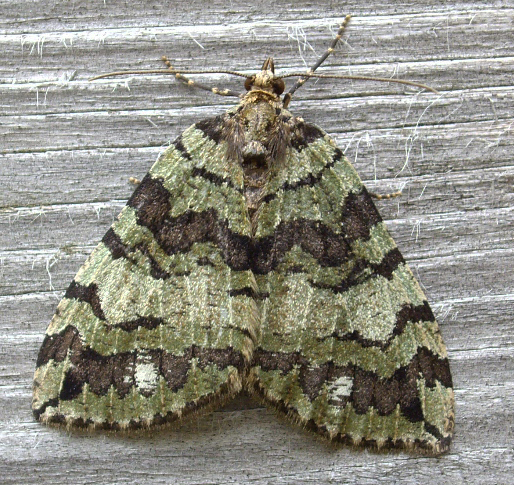

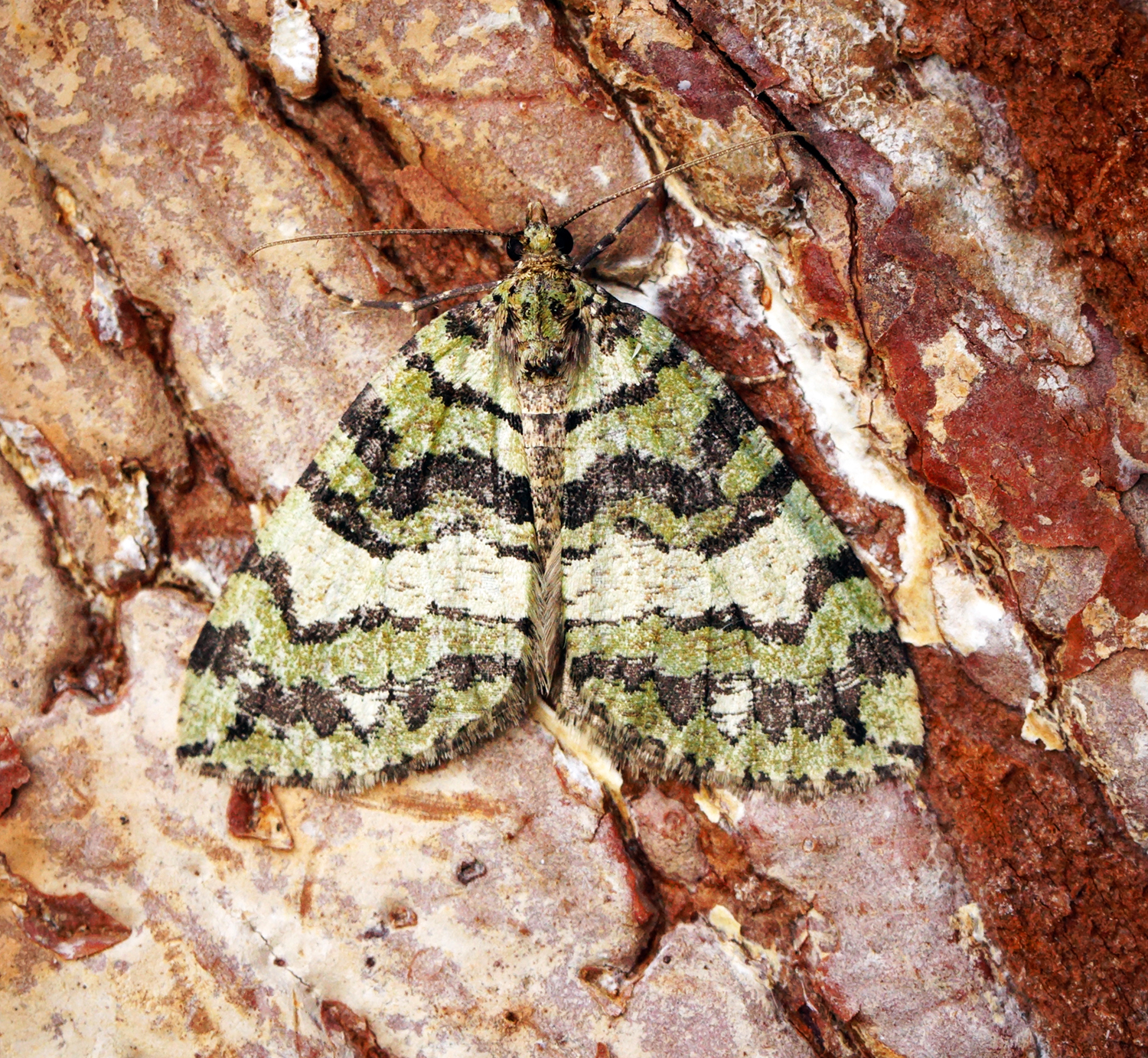

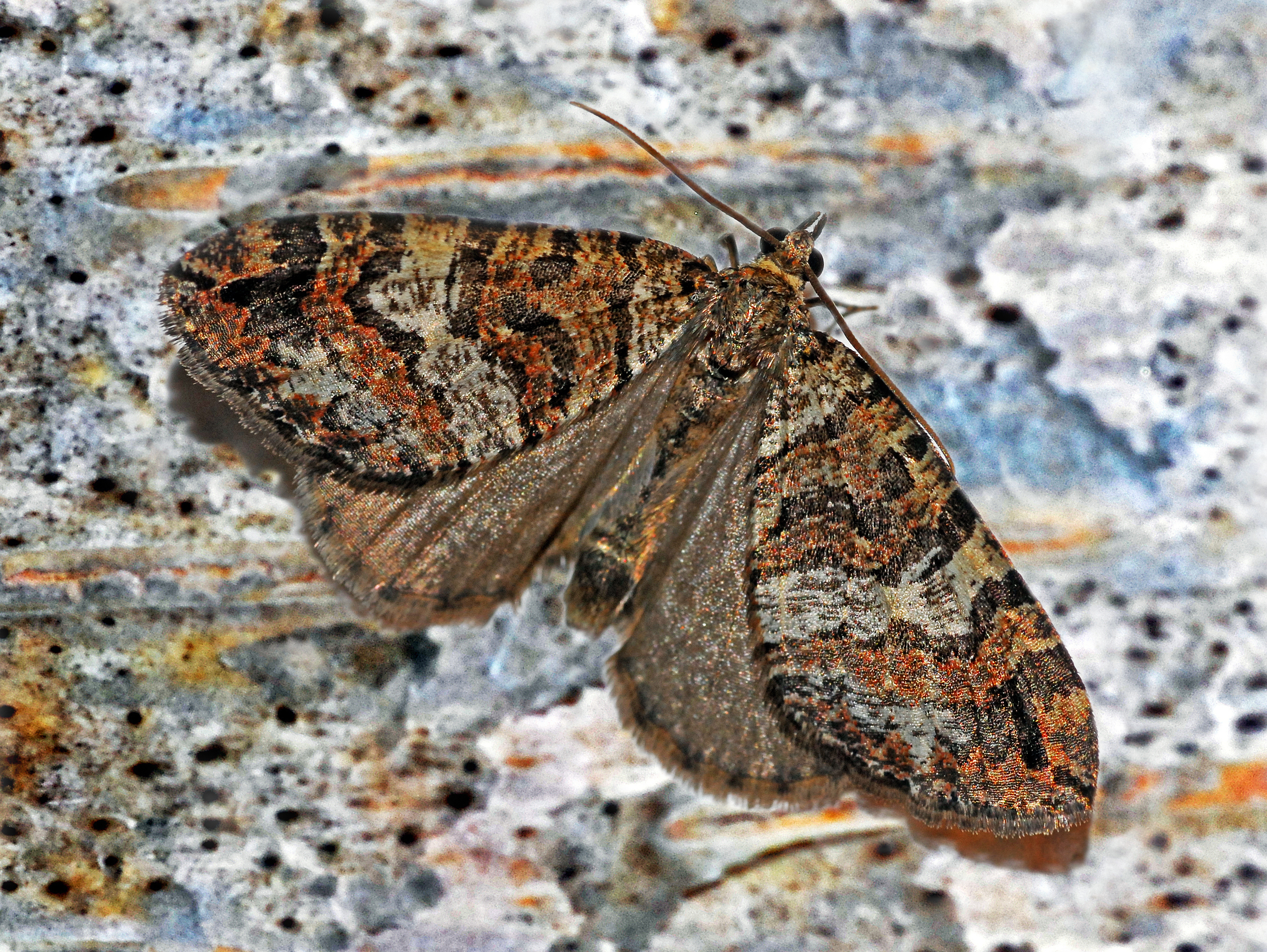
