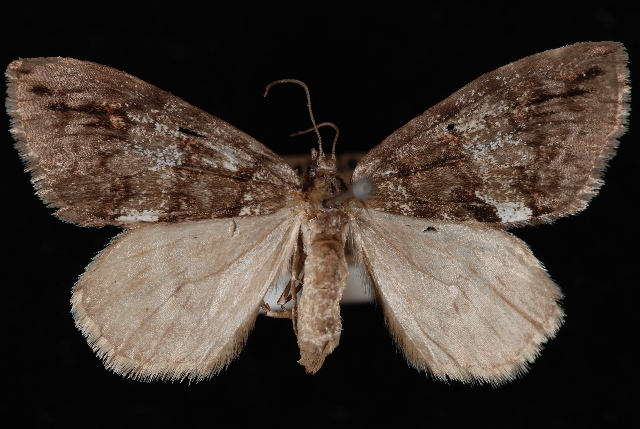

Scientific classification
- Kingdom: Animalia
- Phylum: Arthropoda
- Clade: Pancrustacea
- Class: Insecta
- Order: Lepidoptera
- Family: Geometridae
- Genus: Hydriomena
- Species: H. californiata

Binomial name
- Hydriomena californiata (Packard, 1871)

= Hydriomena californiata =

Species of moth

Hydriomena californiata is a species of geometrid moth in the family Geometridae. It is found in North America.

The MONA or Hodges number for Hydriomena californiata is 7246.
