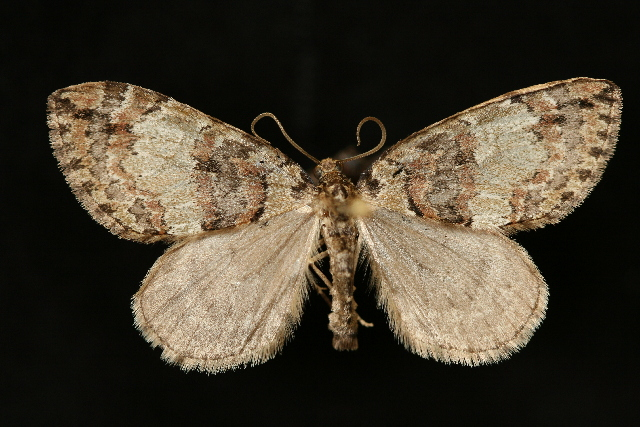

Scientific classification
- Kingdom: Animalia
- Phylum: Arthropoda
- Class: Insecta
- Order: Lepidoptera
- Family: Geometridae
- Genus: Hydriomena
- Species: H. irata

Binomial name
- Hydriomena irata Swett, 1910

= Hydriomena irata =

Species of moth

Hydriomena irata is a species of geometrid moth in the family Geometridae. It is found in North America.

The MONA or Hodges number for Hydriomena irata is 7228.

== Subspecies ==
These three subspecies belong to the species Hydriomena irata:

- Hydriomena irata irata^{g}
- Hydriomena irata lolata McDunnough, 1954^{c g}
- Hydriomena irata quaesitata Barnes & McDunnough, 1918^{c g}

Data sources: i = ITIS, c = Catalogue of Life, g = GBIF, b = Bugguide.net
