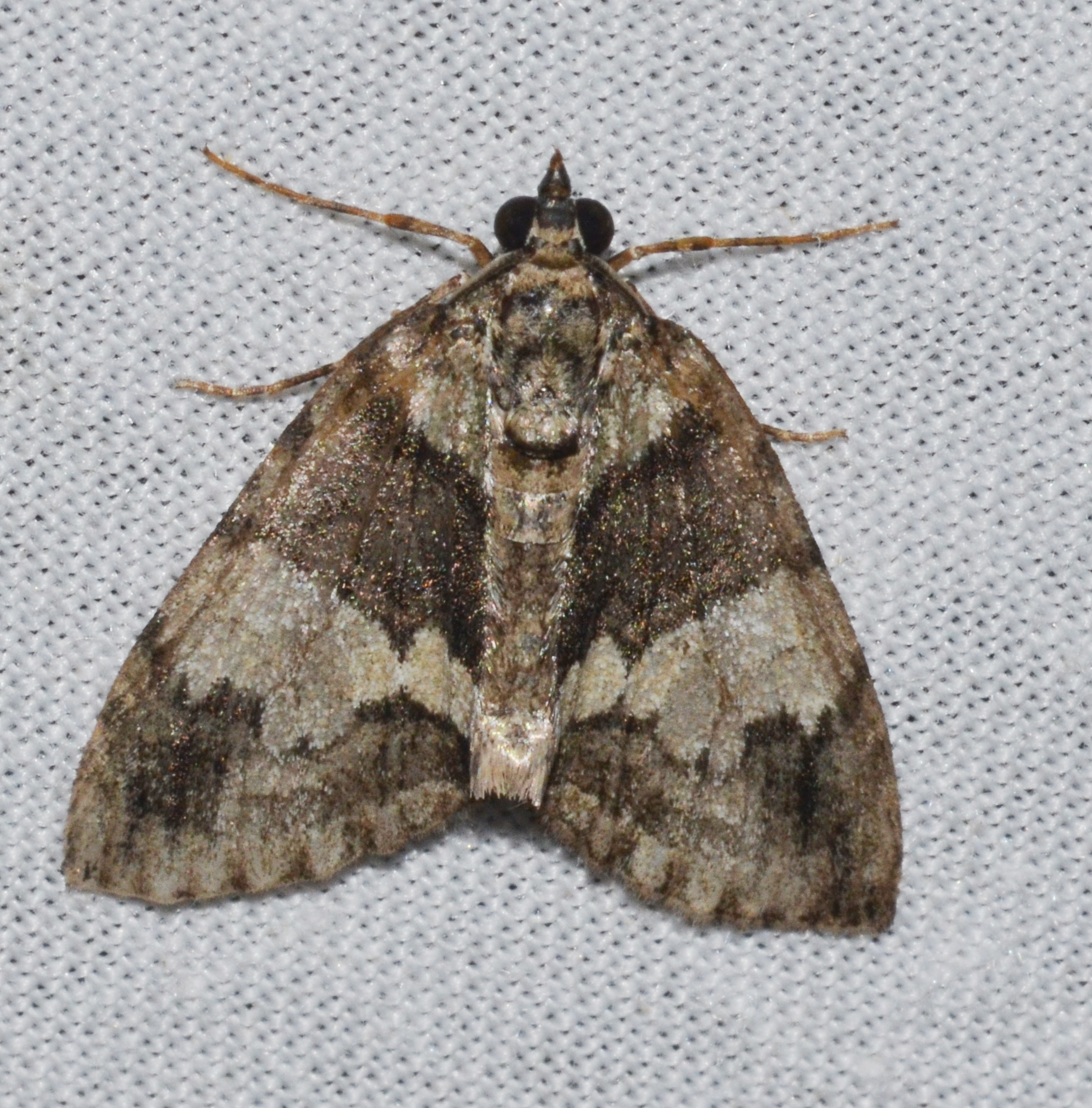

Scientific classification
- Kingdom: Animalia
- Phylum: Arthropoda
- Class: Insecta
- Order: Lepidoptera
- Family: Geometridae
- Genus: Hydriomena
- Species: H. divisaria

Binomial name
- Hydriomena divisaria (Walker, 1860)

Synonyms
- Cleora divisaria Walker, 1860; Cidaria frigidata Walker 1863

= Hydriomena divisaria =

Species of moth

Hydriomena divisaria, the black-dashed hydriomena moth, is a moth in the family Geometridae. It is found in North America, where it has been recorded from southern Canada and the northern United States, south to Georgia in the east.

The wingspan is 24–30 mm. Adults have been recorded on wing mainly in April to July.

The larvae feed on Abies balsamea, Pinus and Picea species.

== Subspecies ==
- Hydriomena divisaria divisaria
- Hydriomena divisaria brunnescens McDunnough, 1954
- Hydriomena divisaria frigidata (Walker, 1863)
