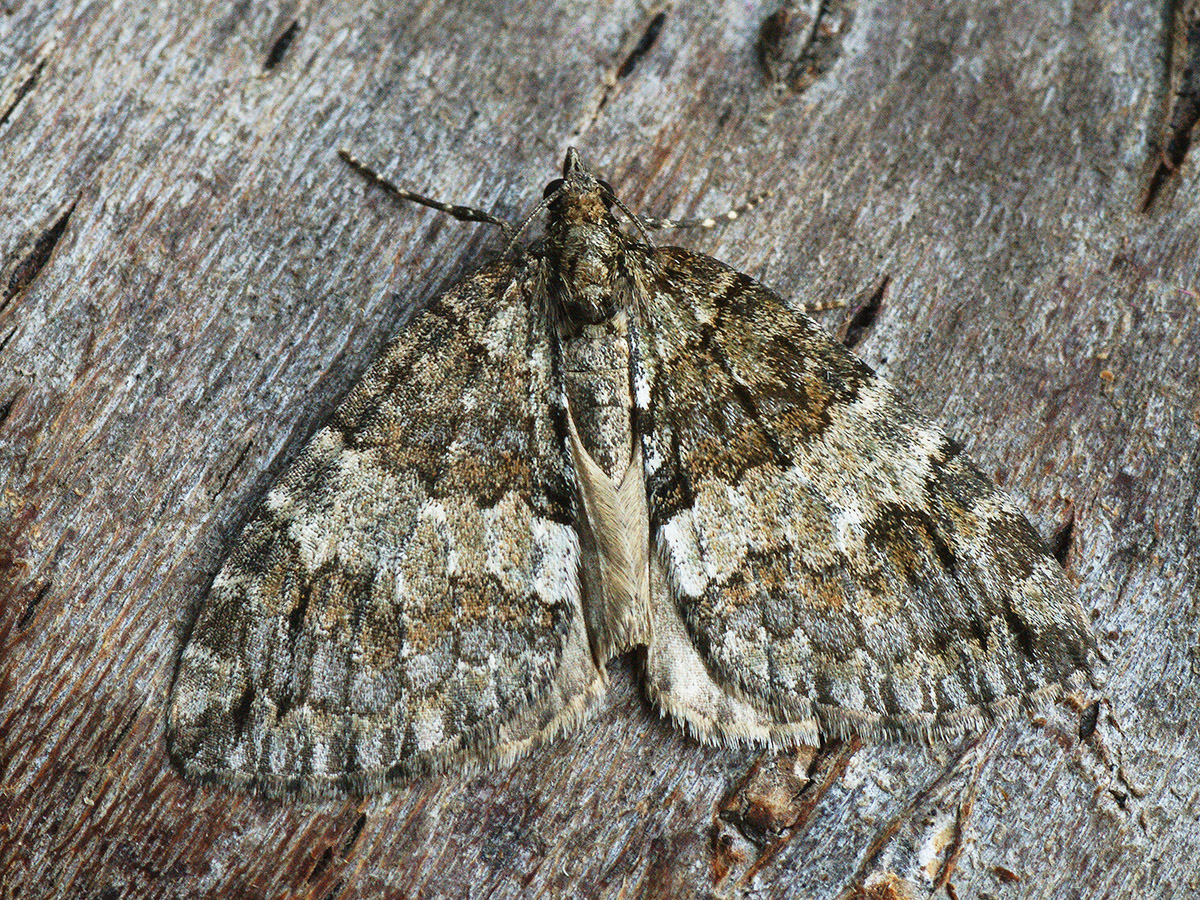

Scientific classification
- Kingdom: Animalia
- Phylum: Arthropoda
- Class: Insecta
- Order: Lepidoptera
- Family: Geometridae
- Genus: Hydriomena
- Species: H. impluviata

Binomial name
- Hydriomena impluviata (Denis & Schiffermüller, 1775)

= May highflyer =

Species of moth

The May highflyer (Hydriomena impluviata) is a moth of the family Geometridae. It is found across the Palearctic region and the Near East although its range is largely determined by the presence of its larval food plant. The species was first described by Michael Denis and Ignaz Schiffermüller in 1775.

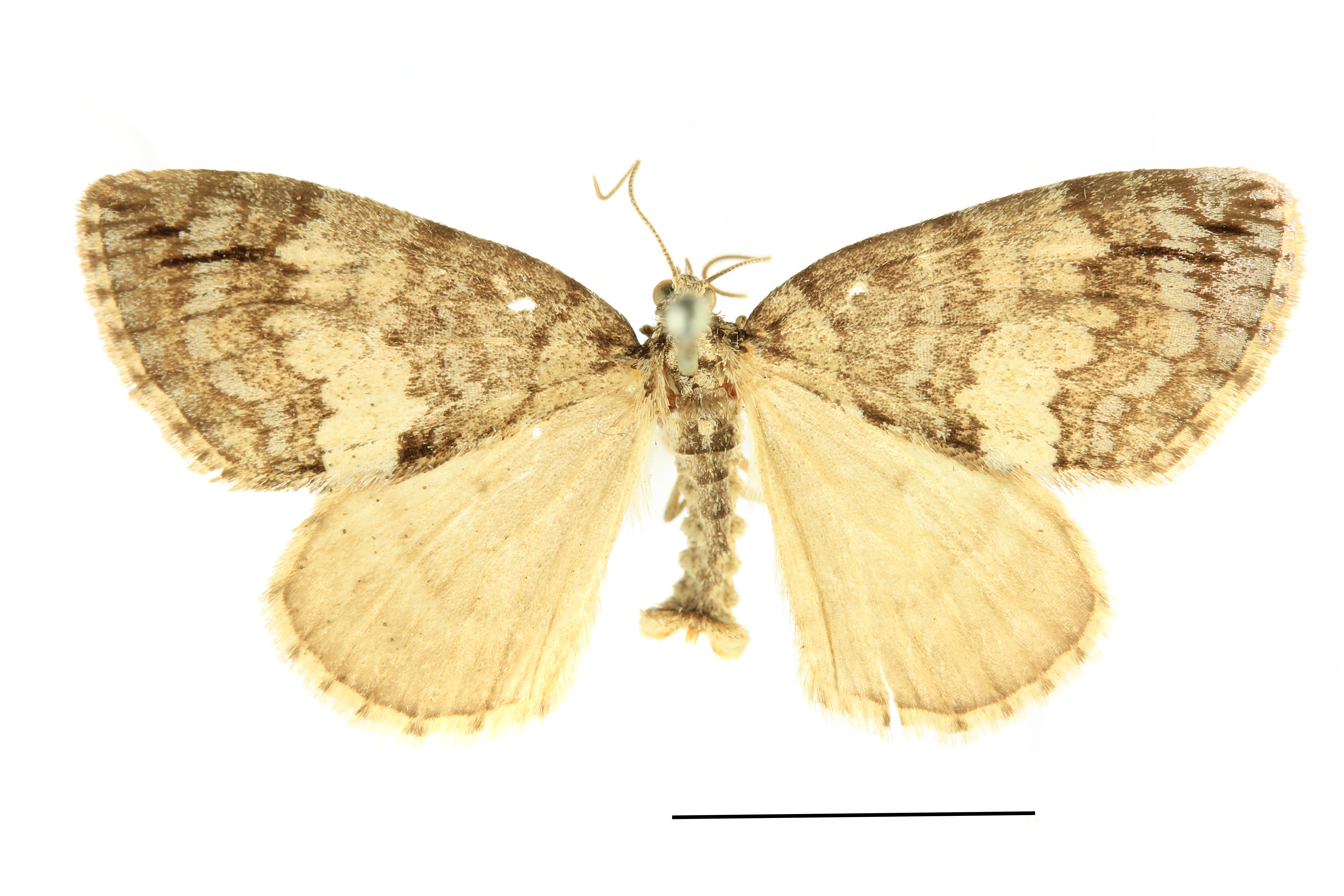
Museum specimen

The wingspan is 30–34 mm and it is quite variable in markings, the best identification feature being four square spots along the costa of each forewing, although these may not be visible in the frequent melanic forms. "Individual specimens of coerulata (synonym of impluviata) bear a very close resemblance to Hydriomena ruberata. coerulata (impluviata) is perhaps on an average slightly smaller, is somewhat shorter-winged, oftener with a very pale, blue-green median band, the oblique subbasal line is straight, or only very weakly angulated in the cell, the black marks on the hindmargin of the forewing and on the anterior veins distally, which generally characterize both species, on an average less strongly developed than in ruberata but very variable in both species".

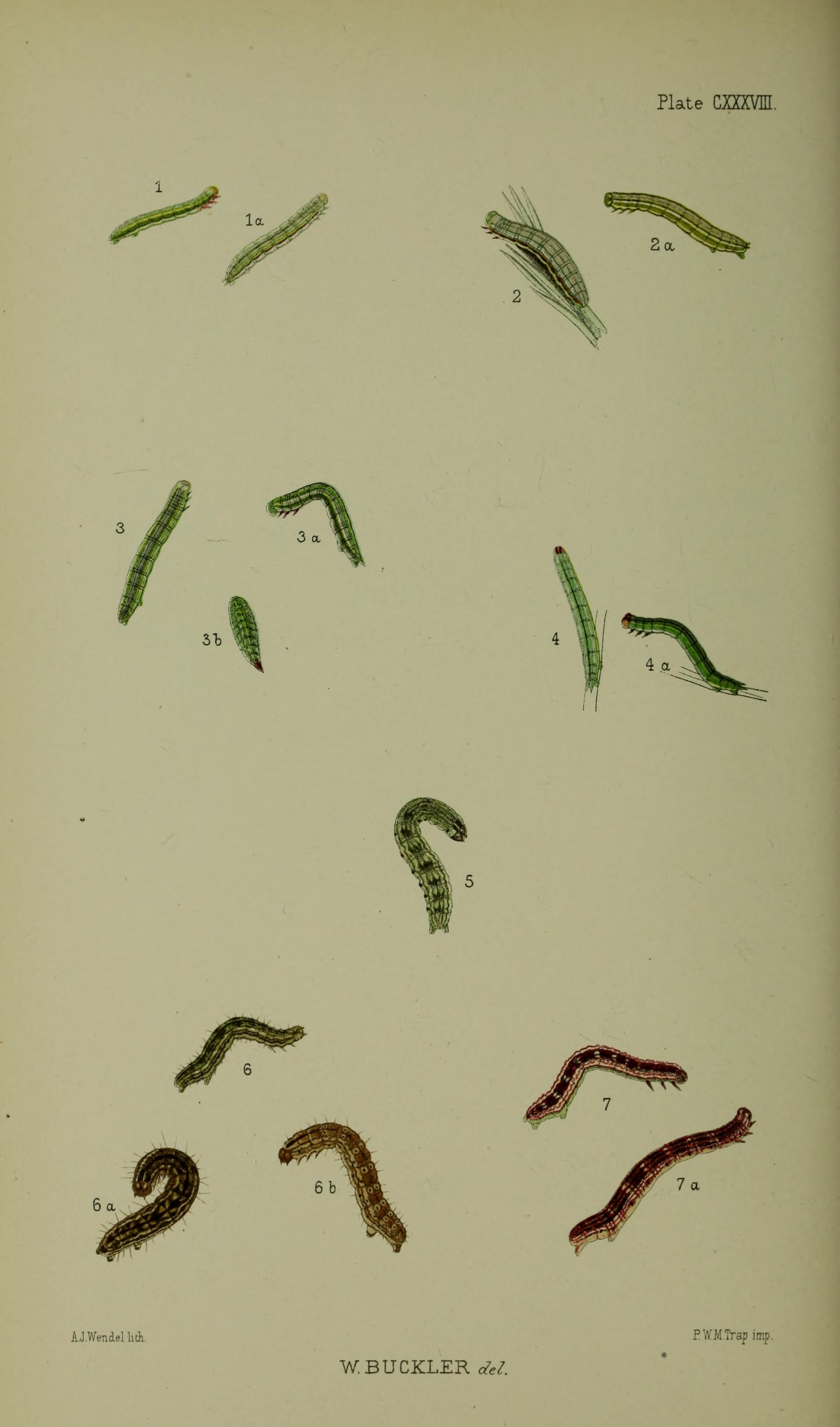
Figs Figs 6,6a, 6b larvae in various stages of development

The larva is relatively powerful and dark red-purple in colour. It has some short setae.

The species flies at night from May to July and is attracted to light.

The larva feeds on the leaves of alder, spinning two leaves together so it can feed undisturbed. The species overwinters as a pupa under loose alder bark.

1. The flight season refers to the British Isles. This may vary in other parts of the range.

== Subspecies ==
- H. i. impluviata
- H. i. insulicolata
