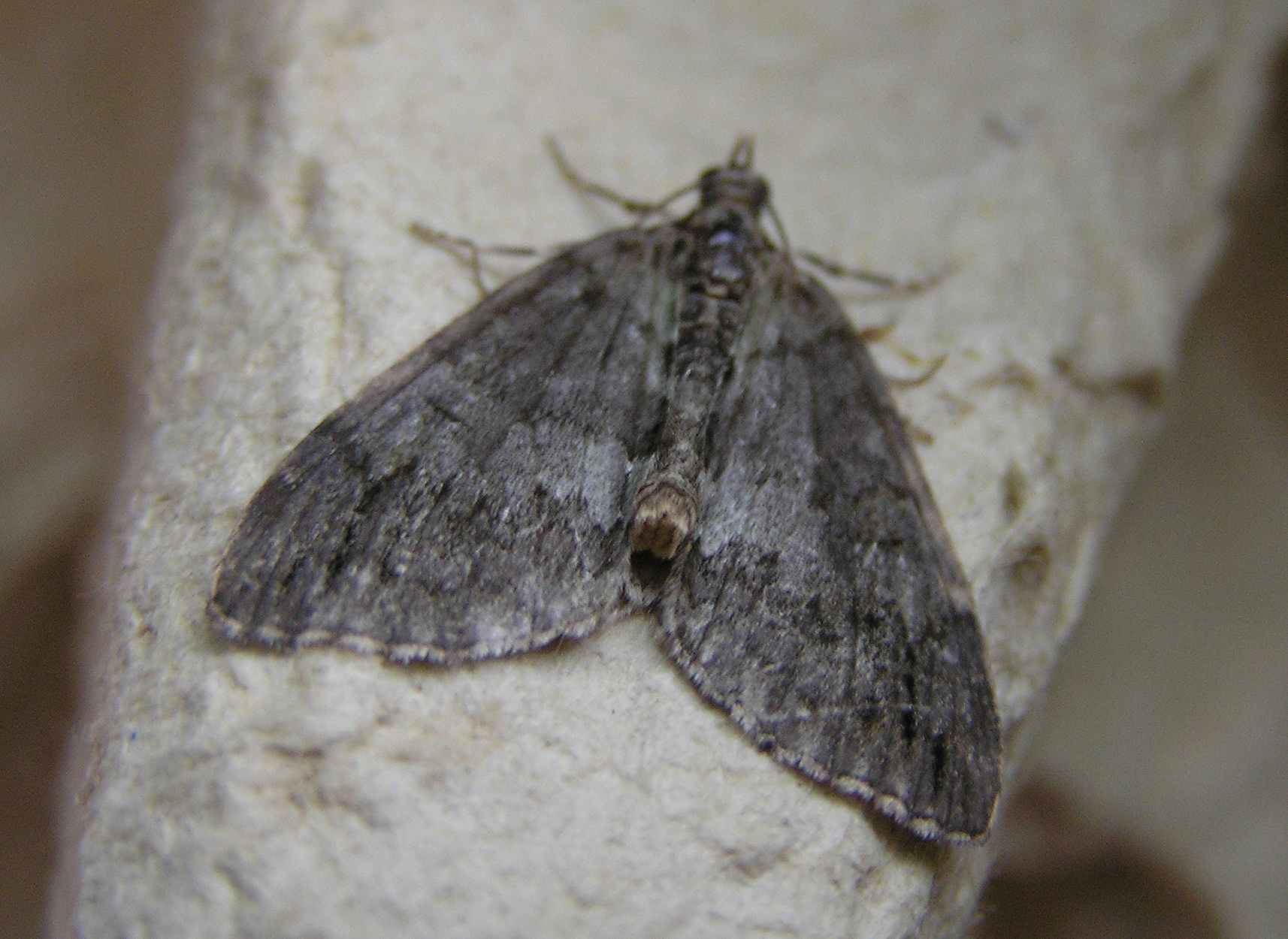
- Hydriomena impluviata

Scientific classification
- Kingdom: Animalia
- Phylum: Arthropoda
- Clade: Pancrustacea
- Class: Insecta
- Order: Lepidoptera
- Family: Geometridae
- Tribe: Hydriomenini
- Genus: Hydriomena; Hübner, [1825]

Synonyms
- Karacidaria Matsumura, 1925; Rhodomena Warren, 1904

= Hydriomena =

Genus of moths

Hydriomena is a genus of moths in the family Geometridae described by Jacob Hübner in 1825.

== Species ==
- Hydriomena albifasciata (Packard, 1874)
- Hydriomena albimontanata McDunnough, 1939
- Hydriomena arida (Butler, 1879)
- Hydriomena arizonata Barnes & McDunnough, 1917
- Hydriomena barnesata Swett, 1909
- Hydriomena bistriolata (Zeller, 1872)
- Hydriomena borussata Barnes & McDunnough, 1918
- Hydriomena bryanti McDunnough, 1943
- Hydriomena californiata Packard, 1871
- Hydriomena canescens Philpott, 1918
- Hydriomena catalinata McDunnough, 1943
- Hydriomena charlestonia McDunnough, 1954
- Hydriomena chiricahuata Swett, 1909
- Hydriomena clarkei (Howes, 1917)
- Hydriomena clarki W. S. Wright, 1920
- Hydriomena cochiseata Swett, 1909
- Hydriomena costipunctata Barnes & McDunnough, 1912
- Hydriomena crokeri Swett, 1910
- Hydriomena cyriadoides McDunnough, 1954
- Hydriomena deltoidata (Walker, 1862)
- Hydriomena divisaria (Walker, 1860)
- Hydriomena edenata Swett, 1909
- Hydriomena exculpata Barnes & McDunnough, 1917
- Hydriomena expurgata Barnes & McDunnough, 1918
- Hydriomena feminata McDunnough, 1944
- Hydriomena furcata (Thunberg, 1784) – July highflyer
- Hydriomena furculoides Barnes & McDunnough, 1917
- Hydriomena furtivata McDunnough, 1939
- Hydriomena glaucata (Packard, 1874)
- Hydriomena gracillima McDunnough, 1944
- Hydriomena hemizona Meyrick, 1897
- Hydriomena henshawi Swett, 1912
- Hydriomena impluviata (Denis & Schiffermüller, 1775) – May highflyer
- Hydriomena iolanthe Hudson, 1939
- Hydriomena irata Swett, 1910
- Hydriomena johstoni McDunnough, 1954
- Hydriomena macdunnoughi Swett, 1918
- Hydriomena magnificata Taylor, 1906
- Hydriomena manzanita Taylor, 1906
- Hydriomena marinata Barnes & McDunnough, 1917
- Hydriomena mississippiensis McDunnough, 1952
- Hydriomena modestata Barnes & McDunnough, 1917
- Hydriomena morosata Barnes & McDunnough, 1917
- Hydriomena muscata Barnes & McDunnough, 1917
- Hydriomena nevadae Barnes & McDunnough, 1917
- Hydriomena nubilofasciata (Packard, 1871)
- Hydriomena obliquilinea Barnes & McDunnough, 1917
- Hydriomena peratica Rindge, 1956
- Hydriomena perfracta Swett, 1910
- Hydriomena pluviata (Guenée, 1857)
- Hydriomena purpurifera (Fereday, 1884)
- Hydriomena quinquefasciata (Packard, 1871)
- Hydriomena regulata Pearsall, 1909
- Hydriomena renunciata (Walker, 1862)
- Hydriomena rita McDunnough, 1954
- Hydriomena rixata (Felder & Rogenhofer, 1875)
- Hydriomena ruberata (Freyer, 1831) – ruddy highflyer
- Hydriomena septemberata McDunnough, 1952
- Hydriomena shasta Barnes & McDunnough, 1917
- Hydriomena sierrae Barnes & McDunnough, 1917
- Hydriomena similaris Hulst, 1896
- Hydriomena speciosata (Packard, 1874)
- Hydriomena sperryi McDunnough, 1952
- Hydriomena transfigurata Swett, 1912
- Hydriomena tuolumne Barnes & McDunnough, 1917

The extinct species Hydriomena? protrita Cockerell, 1922 from the Priabonian age Florissant Formation is possibly a member of this genus.
