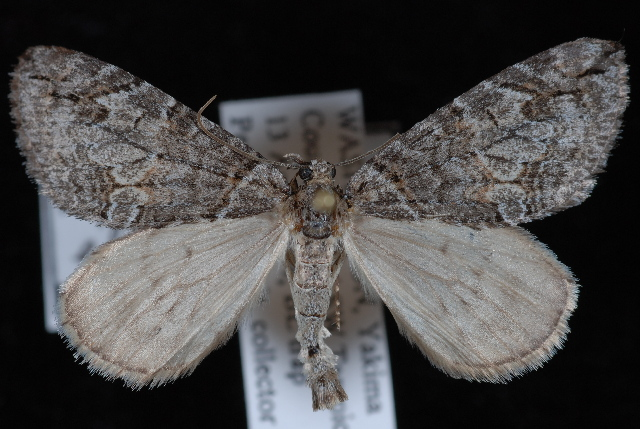

Scientific classification
- Kingdom: Animalia
- Phylum: Arthropoda
- Class: Insecta
- Order: Lepidoptera
- Family: Geometridae
- Tribe: Hydriomenini
- Genus: Hydriomena
- Species: H. edenata

Binomial name
- Hydriomena edenata Swett, 1909

= Hydriomena edenata =

Species of moth

Hydriomena edenata is a species of geometrid moth in the family Geometridae. It is found in North America.

The MONA or Hodges number for Hydriomena edenata is 7232.

== Subspecies ==
These seven subspecies belong to the species Hydriomena edenata:

- Hydriomena edenata baueri McDunnough, 1954
- Hydriomena edenata edenata
- Hydriomena edenata grandis Barnes & McDunnough, 1917
- Hydriomena edenata indistincta McDunnough, 1952
- Hydriomena edenata olivata Wright, 1916
- Hydriomena edenata pallidata Wright, 1916
- Hydriomena edenata prasinata McDunnough, 1954
