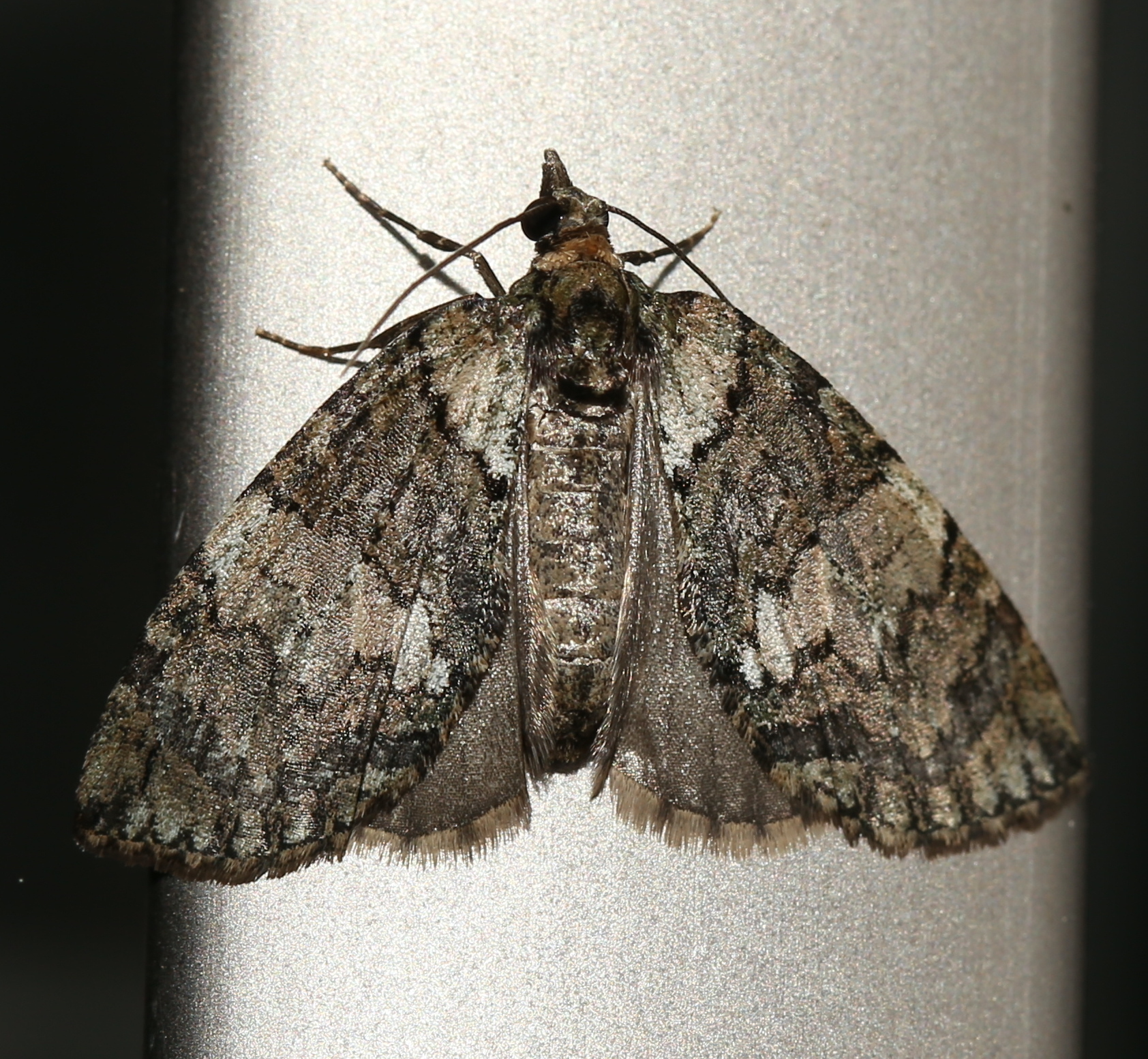

Scientific classification
- Kingdom: Animalia
- Phylum: Arthropoda
- Clade: Pancrustacea
- Class: Insecta
- Order: Lepidoptera
- Family: Geometridae
- Genus: Hydriomena
- Species: H. transfigurata

Binomial name
- Hydriomena transfigurata Swett, 1912

Synonyms
- Hydriomena manitoba Barnes & McDunnough, 1917

= Hydriomena transfigurata =

Species of moth

Hydriomena transfigurata, the transfigured hydriomena moth, is a moth of the family Geometridae.

== Description ==
The wingspan is 26–33 mm. Adults have been recorded on wing from February to August, with most records from March to June.

The larvae feed on Pinus species.

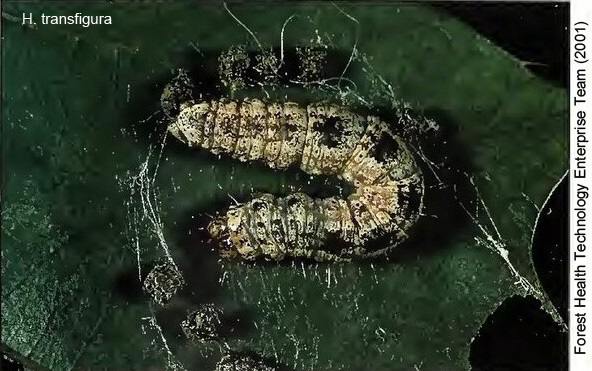
Hydriomena transfigurata caterpillar

== Range ==
It is found in North America, where it has been recorded from Alberta, Florida, Georgia, Indiana, Iowa, Kentucky, Maine, Manitoba, Maryland, Massachusetts, Minnesota, Missouri, New Brunswick, New Hampshire, New Jersey, New York, Newfoundland, North Carolina, Nova Scotia, Ohio, Oklahoma, Ontario, Quebec, South Carolina, Vermont, West Virginia and Wisconsin.
