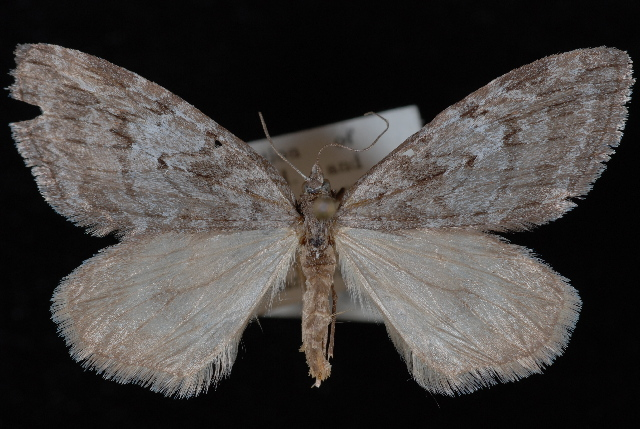

Scientific classification
- Kingdom: Animalia
- Phylum: Arthropoda
- Class: Insecta
- Order: Lepidoptera
- Family: Geometridae
- Tribe: Hydriomenini
- Genus: Hydriomena
- Species: H. manzanita

Binomial name
- Hydriomena manzanita Taylor, 1906

= Hydriomena manzanita =

Species of moth

Hydriomena manzanita is a species of geometrid moth in the family Geometridae. It is found in North America.

The MONA or Hodges number for Hydriomena manzanita is 7277.
