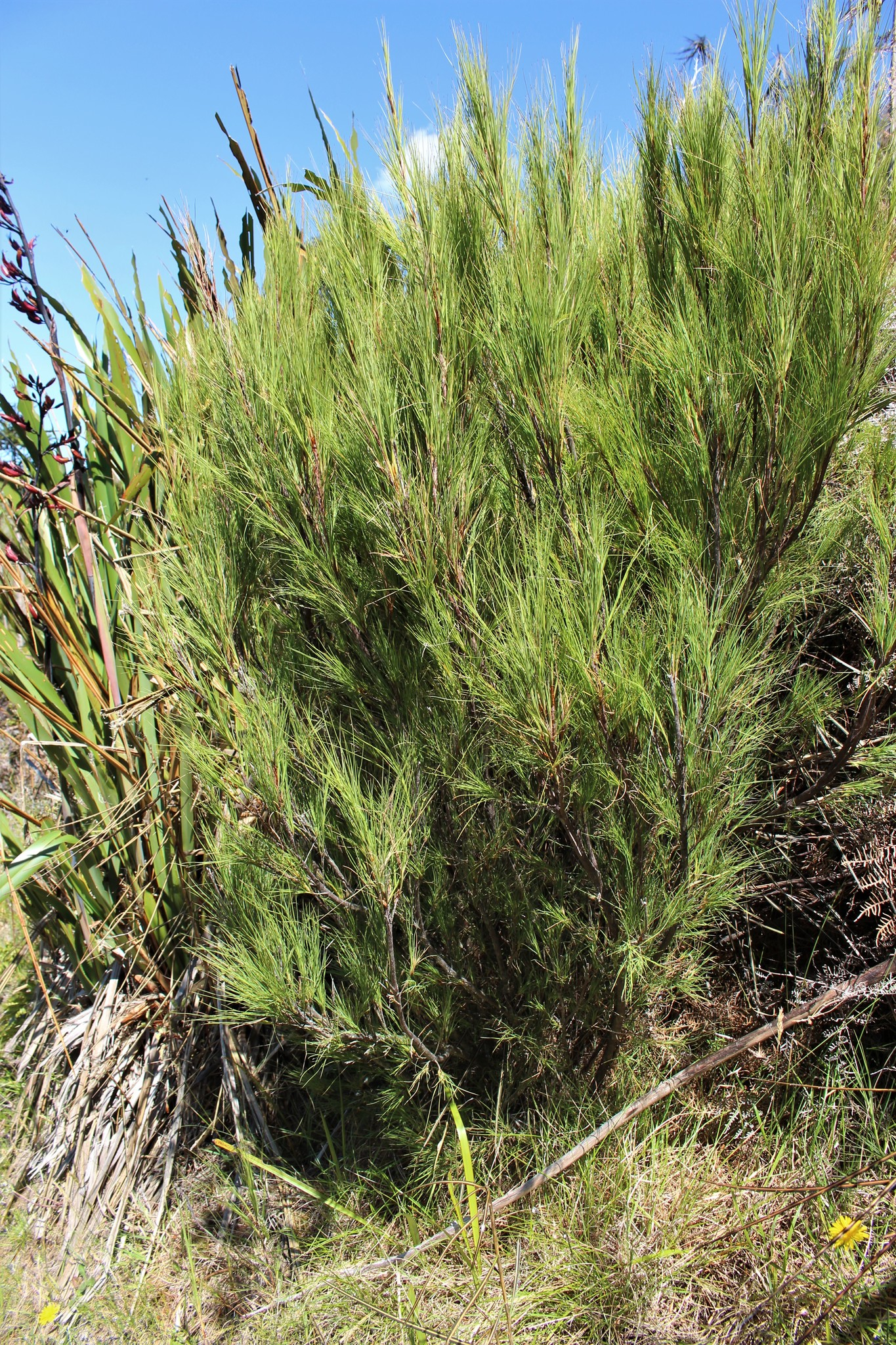

Conservation status
- Not Threatened (NZ TCS)

Scientific classification
- Kingdom: Plantae
- Clade: Embryophytes
- Clade: Tracheophytes
- Clade: Spermatophytes
- Clade: Angiosperms
- Clade: Eudicots
- Clade: Asterids
- Order: Ericales
- Family: Ericaceae
- Genus: Dracophyllum
- Species: D. acerosum

Binomial name
- Dracophyllum acerosum Berggr.

Synonyms
- Dracophyllum uniflorum var. acicularifolium Cheeseman: Dracophyllum acicularifolium (Cheeseman) Cockayne nom. illeg.; Dracophyllum peninsulare W.R.B.Oliv.

= Dracophyllum acerosum =

Species of flowering plant in the heath family

Dracophyllum acerosum is a species of shrub or small tree endemic to New Zealand's South Island. In the heath family Ericaceae. It inhabits mountain slopes, ridge lines and hillsides. A 2023 assessment using the New Zealand Threat Classification System classified it as "Not Threatened", giving it an estimated population of more than 100,000.

== Description ==
It is an upright, multi-branched shrub or small tree that reaches 1–2 m (3–7 ft) in height. The bark on old branches is grey and smooth, while young stems are reddish-brown. Thee Leaves are erect and needle-like, measuring 30–190 mm in length but only 0.7–1.5 mm in width. Small white flowers grow on short lateral branches often shorter than the surrounding leaves.

== Taxonomy ==
It was first described by Sven Berggren in 1877 and gets the specific epithet acerosum, meaning needles shaped, for its leaves.
