= Lupine alkaloids =

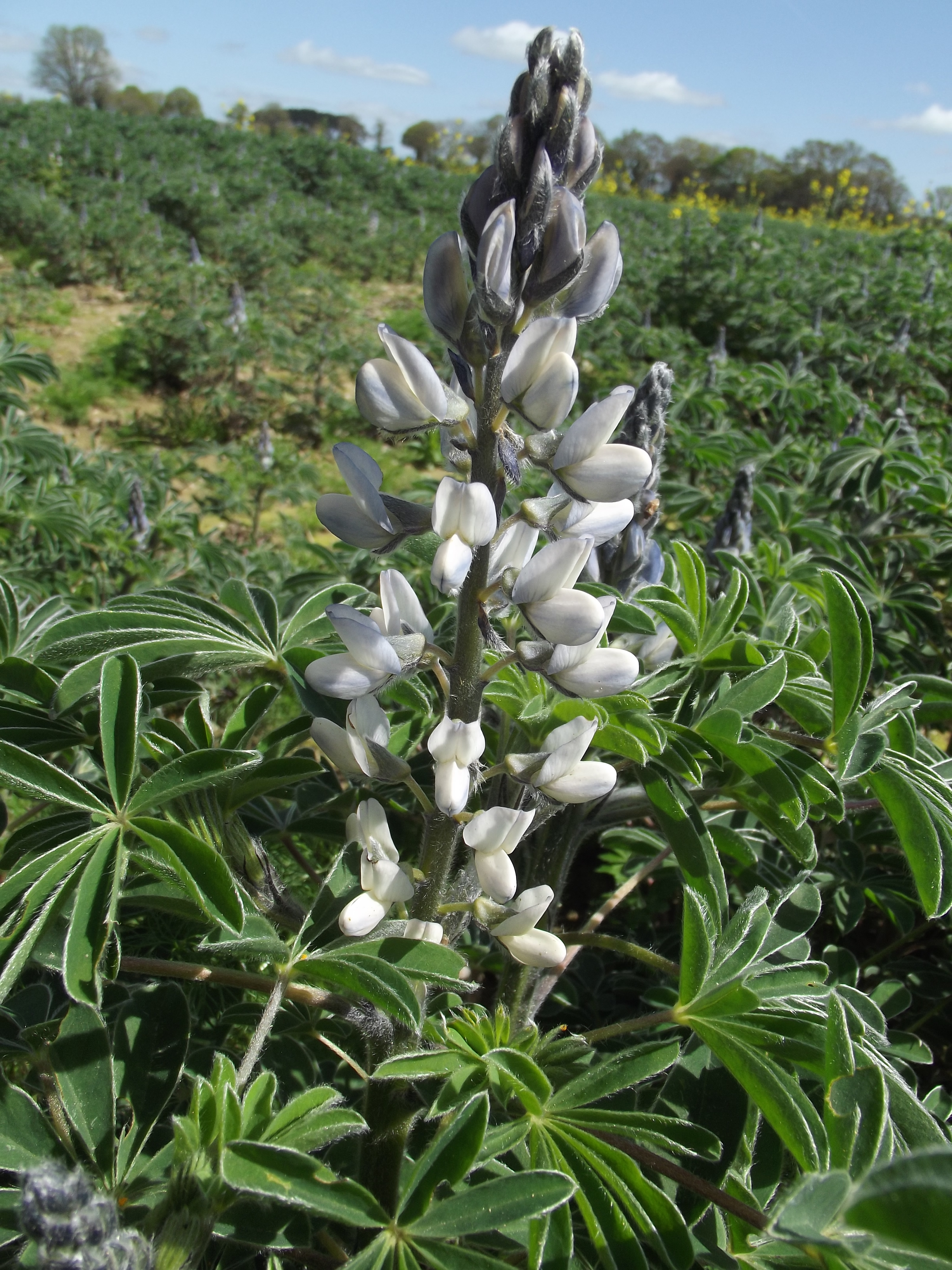
White lupine (Lupinus albus)

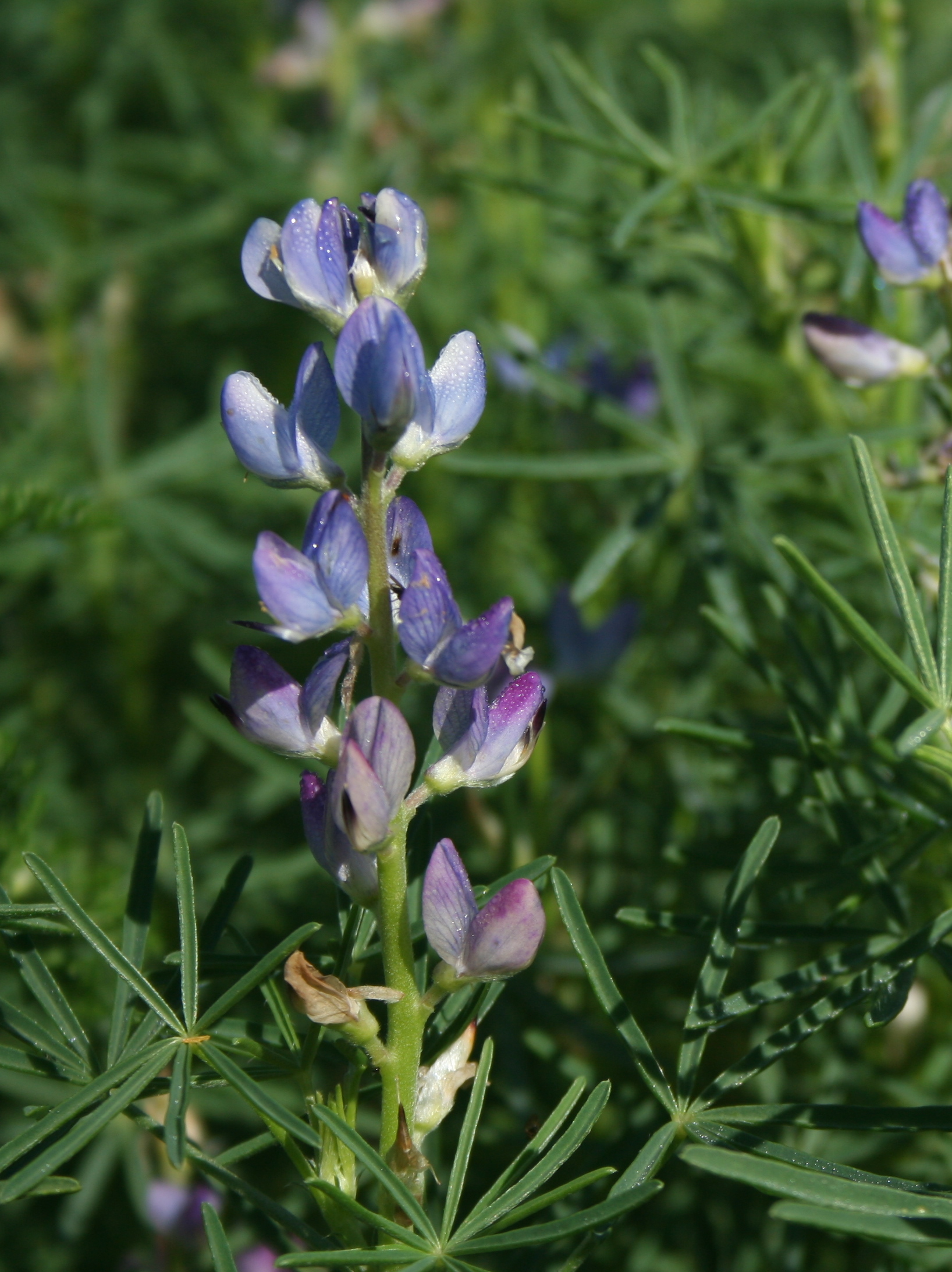
Blue lupine (Lupinus angustifolius)

Lupine alkaloids are natural substances classified as quinolizidine alkaloids. They are named after their presence in lupins.

== Occurrence ==
Depending on the variety, lupins contain between 0.6% and 4.3% lupine alkaloids.

== Representatives ==
More than 170 lupine alkaloids have been identified. The primary alkaloid is lupinin. Other notable compounds include lupanine, lupinine, lupanolin and sparteine. (-)-Lupanine is found in the white lupin, while (+)-lupanine is present in the blue lupin. Both (+)-sparteine and (-)-sparteine occur naturally. (-)-cytisine, the primary alkaloid of the laburnum, is also classified as a lupine alkaloid.

(−)-Lupinin

(+)-Lupanin

(−)-Lupanine

(+)-Sparteine

(−)-Spartein

(−)-Cytisin

== Properties ==
Lupine alkaloids are considered toxic. Grazing animals should not ingest more than 60 g/kg. Symptoms of poisoning include liver and kidney degeneration, miscarriages, and congenital deformities. Sheep are particularly sensitive to these toxins.
