= Lupinine =

Names
- Preferred IUPAC name [(1R,9aR)-Octahydro-2H-quinolizin-1-yl]methanol

Identifiers
CAS Number	486-70-4
3D model (JSmol)	Interactive image
ChEBI	CHEBI:28012
ChEMBL	ChEMBL459397
ChemSpider	82587
ECHA InfoCard	100.006.944
EC Number	207-638-0
KEGG	C10773
PubChem CID	91461
UNII	33BAJ73U1F
CompTox Dashboard (EPA)	DTXSID00197565
- InChI: InChI=1S/C10H19NO/c12-8-9-4-3-7-11-6-2-1-5-10(9)11/h9-10,12H,1-8H2/t9-,10+/m0/s1 Key: HDVAWXXJVMJBAR-VHSXEESVSA-N; InChI=1/C10H19NO/c12-8-9-4-3-7-11-6-2-1-5-10(9)11/h9-10,12H,1-8H2/t9-,10+/m0/s1 Key: HDVAWXXJVMJBAR-VHSXEESVBK
- SMILES: OC[C@H]1[C@@H]2N(CCC1)CCCC2

Properties
Chemical formula	C_{10}H_{19}NO
Molar mass	169.268 g·mol^{−1}
Melting point	68 to 69 °C (154 to 156 °F; 341 to 342 K)
Boiling point	269 to 270 °C (516 to 518 °F; 542 to 543 K)

Hazards
- GHS labelling
Pictograms	(GHS07: Exclamation mark)
Signal word	Warning
Hazard statements	H302, H312, H332
Precautionary statements	P261, P264, P270, P271, P280, P301+P312, P302+P352, P304+P312, P304+P340, P312, P322, P330, P363, P501
- Except where otherwise noted, data are given for materials in their standard state (at 25 °C [77 °F], 100 kPa). verify (what is ?) Infobox references

Lupinine is a quinolizidine alkaloid present in the genus Lupinus (colloquially referred to as lupins) of the flowering plant family Fabaceae. The scientific literature contains many reports on the isolation and synthesis of this compound as well as a vast number of studies on its biosynthesis from its natural precursor, lysine. Studies have shown that lupinine hydrochloride is a mildly toxic acetylcholinesterase inhibitor and that lupinine has an inhibitory effect on acetylcholine receptors. The characteristically bitter taste of lupin beans, which come from the seeds of Lupinus plants, is attributable to the quinolizidine alkaloids which they contain, rendering them unsuitable for human and animal consumption unless handled properly. However, because lupin beans have potential nutritional value due to their high protein content, efforts have been made to reduce their alkaloid content through the development of "sweet" varieties of Lupinus.

== Toxicity ==
Lupinine is a hepatotoxin prevalent in the seeds of leguminous herbs of the genus Lupinus. Lupinine and other quinolizidine alkaloids give a bitter taste to naturally growing lupin flowers. Due to the toxicity of quinolizidine alkaloids, lupin beans are soaked overnight and rinsed to remove some of their alkaloid content. However, when the cooking and rinsing procedure is insufficient, 10 grams of seeds are able to liberate as much as 100 milligrams of lupinine.

The neurotoxicity of lupinine has been known within veterinary medical circles for some time due to the use of lupins as a forage feed for grazing livestock since it has high protein content. It is found to produce lupinosis, which is a morbid, and often fatal condition that results in acute atrophy of liver function and which affects domestic animals such as cattle and sheep. When ingested by humans, quinolizidine alkaloid poisoning causes trembling, shaking, excitation, as well as convulsions. Lupinine, in addition to being orally toxic to mammals, is also an insect antifeedant as well as a growth inhibitor for the grasshopper.

=== Relative toxicity ===
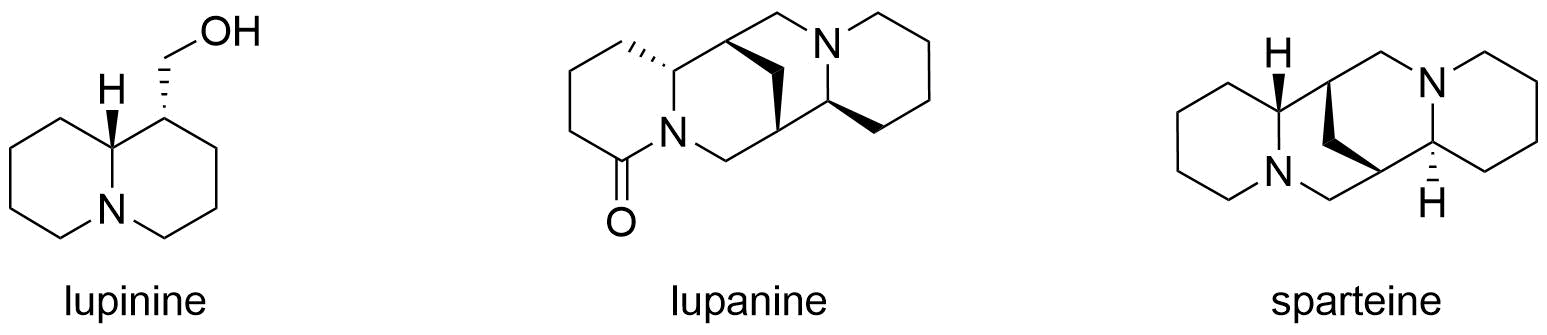
Quinolizidine alkaloids in lupins

Lupinine, in comparison to other quinolizidine alkaloids commonly found in lupins, such as lupanine and sparteine, shows a lower toxicity. Lupinine, with a minimal lethal dose of 28–30 mg/kg and a toxic dose of 25–28 mg/kg, is about 85 percent as toxic as d-lupanine and about 90% as toxic as sparteine. The relative toxicity of lupinine with other quinolizidine alkaloids commonly found in lupins is shown in the table below.

Relative Toxicity of Quinolizidine Alkaloids
Substance	Minimal Lethal Dose (mg/Kg)	Toxic Dose (mg/Kg)
Lupinine	28–30	25–28
Lupanine	22–25	21–24
Sparteine	23–30	21–31

== Mechanism of action ==
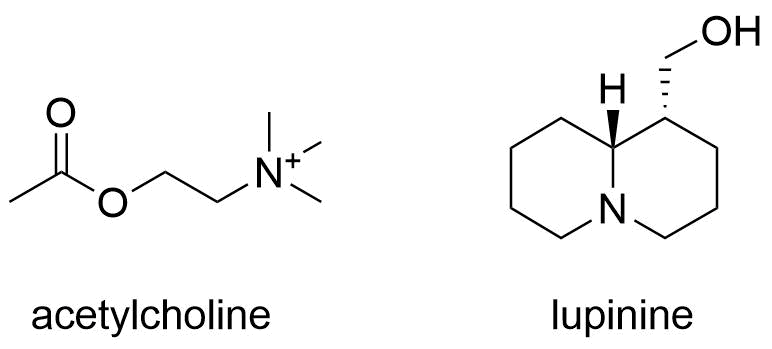
Structural comparison of lupinine and acetylcholine

Studies on the hydrochloride of lupinine have shown it to be a reversible inhibitor of acetylcholinesterases. Lupinine, a nitrogen-containing heterocycle, has a structure similar to the ammonium "head" of the acetylcholinesterase endogenous agonist, acetylcholine. At physiological pH, the amine of lupinine is protonated which leads to ion-ion interaction with the acetylcholinesterase anionic site in the same manner as the ammonium on acetylcholine interacts. Previous studies of reversible ammonium inhibitors similar to lupinine have shown that the ammonium groups (corresponding to the protonated amine of lupinine) enter the gorge of the active center of the acetylcholinesterase in the region of the Trp^{84} residue. This leads to the formation of an enzyme-sorption complex with the anionic portion of the acetylcholinesterase located on the active site of lupinine, namely the amine. This complex blocks the access of acetylcholine to the active center which decreases the catalytic hydrolysis and subsequent breakdown of acetylcholine by acetylcholinesterase. Enzyme inactivation leads to an accumulation of acetylcholine in the body, hyperstimulation of both the muscarinic and nicotinic acetylcholine receptors, as well as subsequent disruption of neurotransmission. However, it was found that the time of incubation did not affect the inhibition, leading to the conclusion that lupinine is a reversible inhibitor.

Studies have also shown that lupinine has a binding affinity for both muscarinic and nicotinic acetylcholine receptors. Lupinine was found to have an IC_{50} value of >500 μM for nicotinic receptors and an IC_{50} value of 190 μM for muscarinic receptors. However, it has yet to be determined whether this affinity is agonistic or antagonistic in nature.

== Synthesis ==
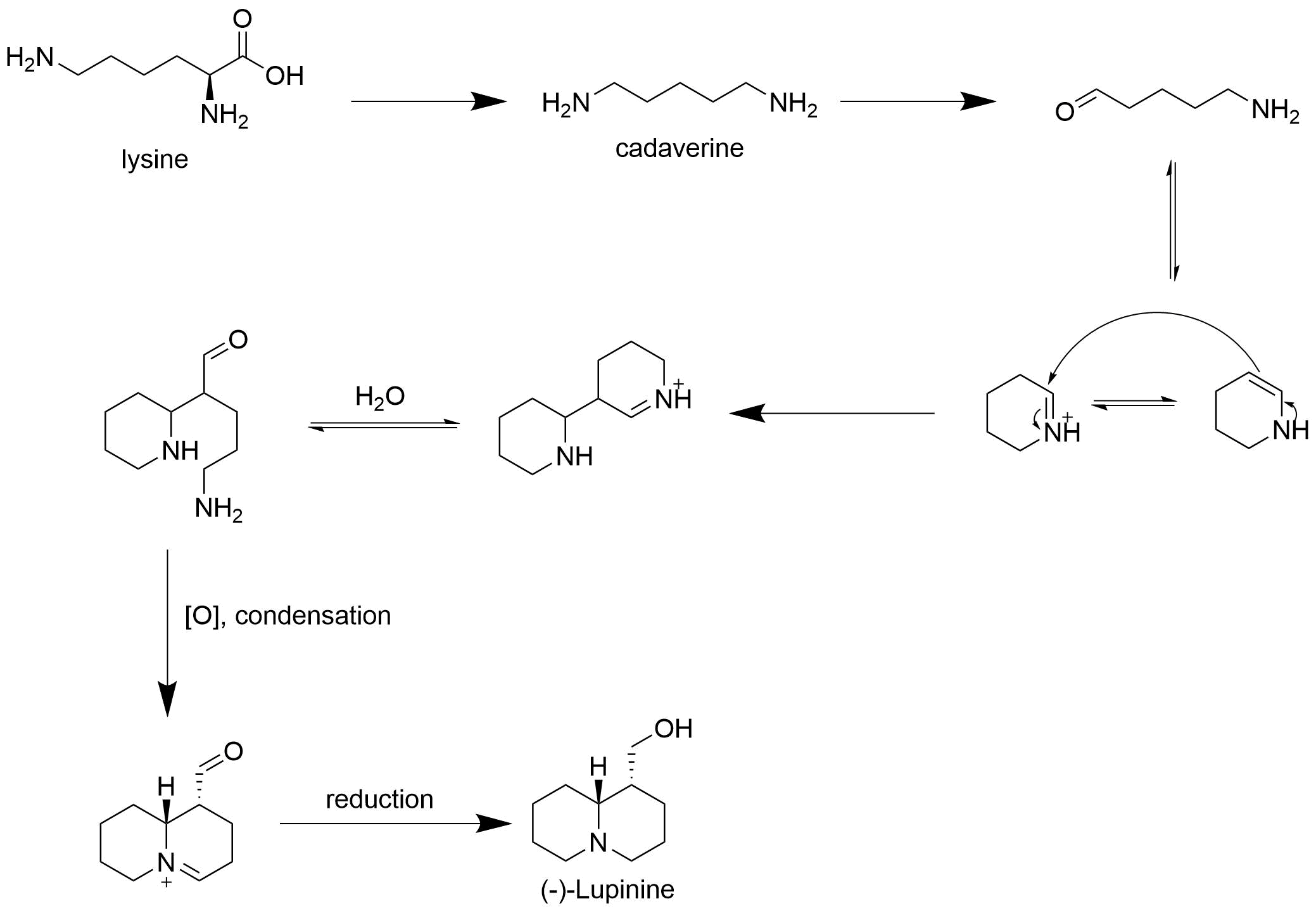
Biosynthesis of lupinine

=== Biological ===
Lupinine is naturally biosynthesized from l-lysine in the Lupinus genes of plants along with various other quinolizidine alkaloids. In the biosynthetic process, lysine is first decarboxylated into cadaverine, which is then oxidatively deaminated to the corresponding aldehyde. The aldehyde is then spontaneously cyclized into two tautmers which couple through an aldol type mechanism in which the allylic amine attacks the iminium, forming a dissymmetric dimeric intermediate which is then hydrated. The primary amine is then oxidized and an intramolecular condensation occurs, giving the quinolizidinealdehyde. The aldehyde is then reduced to an alcohol, giving, enantioselectively, (-)- lupinine.

=== Synthetic ===
Lupinine has a chiral carbon atom; therefore, total syntheses of lupinine need to be enantioselective for (-)-lupinine in order to provide the biologically active product. The first racemic total synthesis of lupinine occurred in 1937 by Clemo, Morgan, and Raper. Six more total syntheses of lupinine followed between 1940 and 1956, with the first enantioselective synthesis of lupinine occurring in 1966 by Goldberg and Ragade. Since that initial enantioselective synthesis, there have been numerous total syntheses of both enantio-pure and racemic lupinine. One synthesis, notable because it describes the preparation of all four stereoisomers of lupinine, and containing many references to earlier work in this field, was published by Ma and Ni. Another total synthesis of specific note due to the enantioselectivity and limited number of steps is by Santos et al. In 2010, Santos et al. synthesized enantioselective (-)- lupinine in 36% yield over eight steps using a double Mitsunobu Reaction. First, they employed asymmetric addition of the starting materials using a Lewis acid, followed by treatment with a reducing agent and a base. This gave the (R,R)-alcohol. This configuration was inverted using a Mitsunobu reaction followed by hydrolysis, affording the (R,S) configuration of the alcohol. The alcohol was then reduced with alane, underwent another Mitsunobu reaction, was hydrolyzed to the acid and finally reduced to (-)-lupinine via alane reduction.

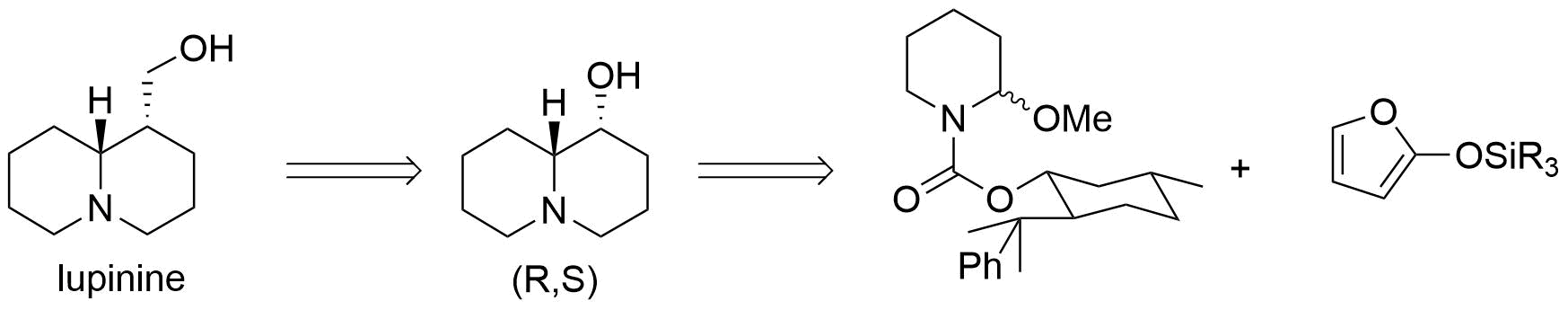
Total retrosynthesis of lupinine by Santos et al.

== Isolation ==
One of the earliest isolations of lupinine, from Lupinus palmeri collected in Utah, USA, is that reported by Couch, who was able to obtain crystalline lupinine without the use of chromatographic techniques.

== Applications ==
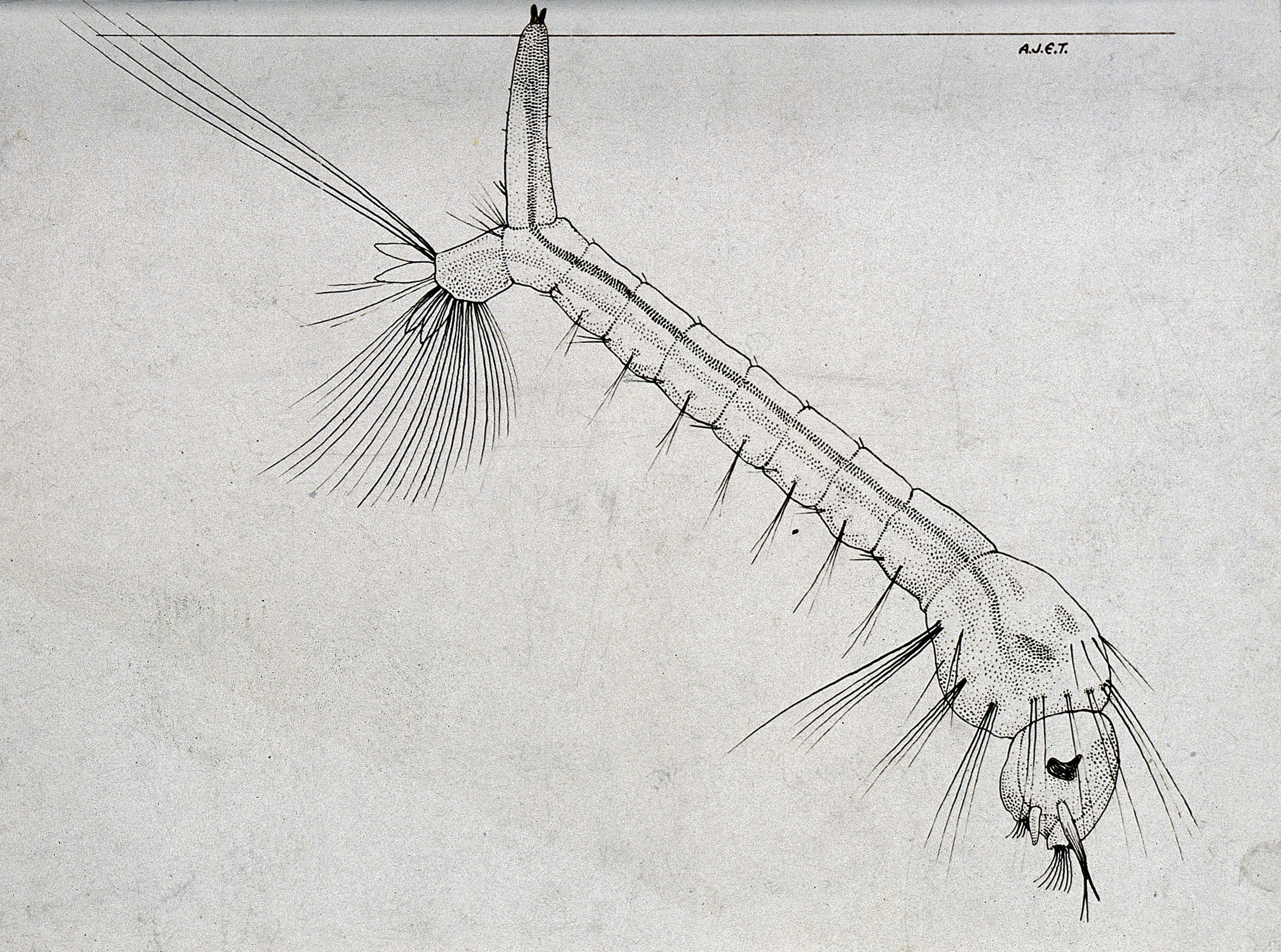
Drawing of a culicine mosquito larva

=== Pest control ===
Lupinine is an insect antifeedant. Studies of its insecticide activity have shown it to be effective against culicine mosquito larvae which are vectors for viruses, filarial worms, and avian malaria.

=== Botany ===
Lupins are often found growing with Castilleja (Indian paintbrush) which uses lupins as a host and confers lupinine and other alkaloids to itself. This works in tandem with the increase in nitrogen fixation to increase parasitic reproduction rates and potentially reduce herbivory activity; however, studies have shown mixed results in the efficacy of alkaloid transfer in prevention of herbivory activity.

== Regulations ==
The European Chemicals Agency (ECA) labels lupinine under the hazard statement codes H302, H312, and H332, which indicate that lupinine is harmful if swallowed, harmful in contact with skin, and harmful if inhaled, respectively. It is given a GHS07 labeling which indicates its acute oral toxicity is category 4.

== See also ==
- Lupin poisoning
- Sparteine
