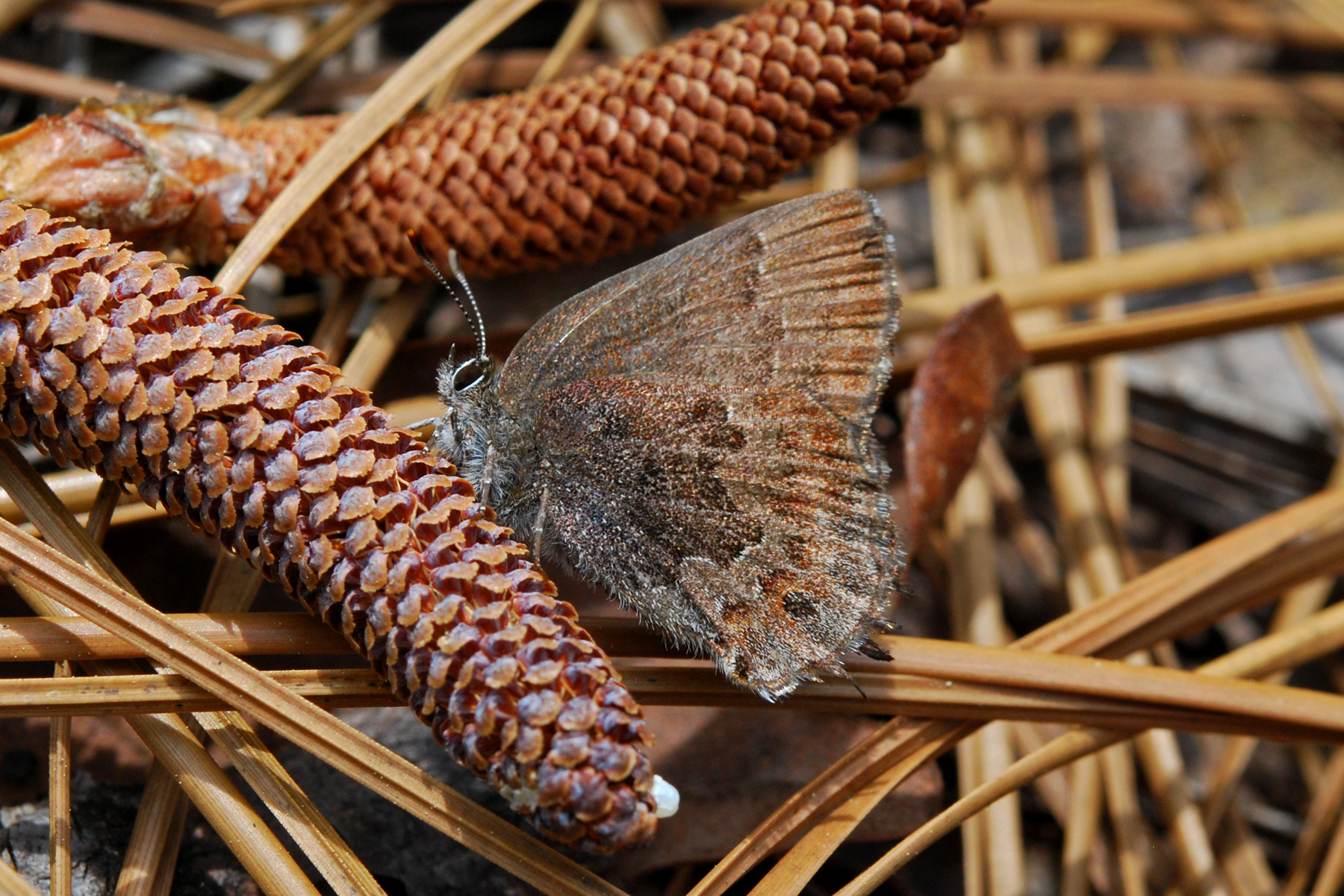

Conservation status
- Imperiled (NatureServe)

Scientific classification
- Kingdom: Animalia
- Phylum: Arthropoda
- Class: Insecta
- Order: Lepidoptera
- Family: Lycaenidae
- Genus: Callophrys
- Species: C. irus

Binomial name
- Callophrys irus (Godart, [1824])

= Callophrys irus =

Frosted elfin

Species of butterfly

Callophrys irus, the frosted elfin, is a species of Lycaenidae that is native to North America.

== Description ==
The wingspan ranges from 22–24 mm (0.87–0.94 in). Hindwings have one short tail. The top side of the wing is brown, males have long oval dark spots on the leading edge of their forewings. The hindwings have submarginal black spots above the tail and below the postmedian line is faint.

== Life history ==
There is one flight period from March to April in the south and in the north it is on wing from mid-May to early June. Females will lay eggs singly on flower buds. The caterpillars eat both the flower and the developing seedpods. Chrysalids hibernate in loosely formed cocoons beneath litter below the plant. Larval foods include the pea family (Fabaceae), indigo (Baptisia tinctoria), lupine (Lupinus perennis), and rattlebox (Crotalaria sagittalis).

== Range ==
They range from local colonies in Maine west across New York, southern Ontario, and Michigan into Wisconsin, then south along the Atlantic Coast west into Louisiana and eastern Texas. Within this range they tend to stick to open woods and scrublands.

In 2011, zoologists with the Virginia Department of Conservation and Recreation found populations of the butterfly in the city of Suffolk, Virginia, and a volunteer also found a population at Antioch Pines Natural Area Preserve. The butterfly had not been reported in Virginia since 1994. The species is listed as threatened in Connecticut, New York, and Michigan.

== Species description ==
The frosted elfin (Callophrys Irus) is a gossamer-wing butterfly with brown forewings and frosted gray with a dark spot and irregular dark line on the underside of the tailed hind wings. The larvae (caterpillars) are pale greenish white with a pale lateral line and oblique dashes along the sides covered in short whiteish hairs.

The entire life-cycle of a frosted elfin is completed within 1 year. This non-migratory butterfly was one flight from late April through mid-June in the north.

The caterpillars progress through four instars while feeding on both flowers and developing seedpods of host plants. Larvae pupate by late July in the northeast and remain in pupal diapause until the following spring. Hibernation occurs in loose cocoons on or near host plants in litter or beneath the soil surface.

Slightly larger than most elfins of similar morphological appearance, adult frosted elfins obtain sizes in the range of 1.00–1.25 inches (26–32 mm) and both sexes of this species look alike.

Their eggs are laid singly on flower buds of the host plant; caterpillars eat flowers and develop seedpods. Chrysalids hibernate in loose cocoons in litter beneath the plant.

== Habitat and Distribution ==
The frosted elfin is a rare butterfly typically found in sandplain habitats. Their population is declining over much of its range with many extant populations separated by large expanses of unsuitable habitat. They have ranged from southern California to Florida and west to Texas and Wisconsin. The species is most likely extinct in Canada, Maine, and Illinois. They are listed as endangered, threatened, or of special concern in 11 eastern United States, and there is no federal protection of them.

Frosted elfin are historically found in natural barrens, grassy openings, and savannahs. Today, they are mostly in human-made habitats such as powerlines, gravel roads, railroads, and other pits. They prefer sandy soils and always form on very dry sands. The Baptisia-feeding form can also live on rocky outcrops and glacial till. They need some shade and tree cover to survive. Adults prefer more open areas with some tree cover while larvae develop best in close to partial canopy. The adults typically live close to host plants and move towards the shade when it is hot. Frosted elfin tolerate dormant season or late summer mowing, but they do not tolerate spring mowing, nor do they tolerate frequent controlled/prescribed burns. Fire can cause some of the adults to leave their habitats due to poor nectar availability. The range of the frosted elfin species has reduced, leaving many populations isolated.

Given that most frosted elfin pupae likely pupate (this is a stage of metamorphosis where the insect is enclosed in a casing such as a chrysalis or a cocoon) at less than 1.75 cm below ground, high fire-related mortality should be considered when managing for frosted elfins. A balance is needed between fire's impact on frosted elfin survival and the necessity of fire to maintain optimal habitat conditions for its host plant. In situations where prescribed fire is likely to have a large detrimental impact on a population, alternative measures should be considered to maintain the habitat. Such methods could include mowing the habitat to maintain early successional conditions at specific host plant patches or protecting a subset of host plant patches from fire to ensure some survival into the next breeding season. Burning is contributing to decreased survival of the frosted elfin, however, if a certain burning method is used, they are more likely to survive. Alternatives to burning include mowing at specific times or mosaic burning where certain patches are protecting from fire. Habitats need fire to maintain host plant conditions, so managers must balance burn frequency.

== Taxonomy ==
There are many uncertainties revolving the taxonomy of the range of the different subspecies of C. irus. The C. irus may represent two or three species based on what they eat. Lupine-feeding frosted elfins tend to be small and pale while Baptisia-feeding populations are usually larger and darker in color. A test was done to see if the C. irus was genetically formed from its host plants. They were genetically tested using the lupine and the wild indigo plants and it was determined that the C. irus had no genetic distinction based on what plant the C. irus fed on.

According to the FWS, SSA (2018) reports there are three different sub species of the C. irus. Callophrys irus which is most widespread throughout the United States. Callophrys irus hadros which is found in the southwest. Finally there is the Callophrys irus arsace, this subunit stays on the coastal portion of South Carolina. Although all three subspecies have been described by a difference in morphological characteristics there is no evidence to prove that they differ genetically.

== Phylogenetics ==
Lupine feeding larvae feed on flowers and seed pods, while the Baptisia feeding larvae feed on leaves and scrapes stems. Subspecies arsace – coastal Carolinas, extreme variant of the Baptisia feeders. Holotype of irus is the eastern Baptisia feeder, probably from southern New Jersey. The imperiled lupine-feeding entity in north Florida has distinctive adults, which do not closely resemble arsace and are not similar to northern lupine feeders.

Subtle geographic clustering, particularly in mitochondrial DNA. Unique haplotypes in far northern, southern, and western ranges. No host plant contributed to genetic changes. More managed pine barren habitat and most host plants are needed to improve the presence of frosted elfin. There is a lack of genetic structure, indicating that we could reintroduce frosted elfin if efforts remained as regionally local as possible.
