= C15H24N2O2 =

The molecular formula C_{15}H_{24}N_{2}O_{2} (molar mass: 264.363 g/mol) may refer to:

- Oxymatrine
- Tetracaine, or amethocaine
