= Quinolizinium =

Names
- Other names pyrido[1,2-a]pyridinium

Identifiers
CAS Number	255-59-4
3D model (JSmol)	Interactive image
Beilstein Reference	1423269
ChEBI	CHEBI:36646
ChemSpider	107593
PubChem CID	120516
CompTox Dashboard (EPA)	DTXSID60276229
- InChI: InChI=1S/C9H8N/c1-3-7-10-8-4-2-6-9(10)5-1/h1-8H/q+1 Key: GUOHRXPYGSKUGT-UHFFFAOYSA-N
- SMILES: C1=CC=[N+]2C=CC=CC2=C1

Properties
Chemical formula	C_{9}H_{8}N^{+}
Appearance	colorless

Related compounds
Related compounds	4H-Quinolizine
- Except where otherwise noted, data are given for materials in their standard state (at 25 °C [77 °F], 100 kPa). Infobox references

Quinolizinium refers to the heterocyclic cation with the formula C_{9}H_{8}N^{+}. The cation is isoelectronic and nearly isostructural with naphthalene, the difference being the replacement of one of the two carbons at the fusion positions with N^{+}. The parent quinolizine has not been isolated but salts of these aromatic quinolizinium compounds are well known. Several syntheses begin with 2-substituted pyridines and involve N-alkylation and various dehydrogenation reactions. The quinolizinium core is represented in the berberine family of natural products. It is formally derived from the elusive quinolizines by hydrde abstraction. According to X-ray crystallography of the hexafluorophosphate salt, which is colorless, C_{9}H_{8}N^{+} is planar.

== Reactions ==
Being a cation, quinolinizium resists electrophilic attack, although it can be brominated. Catalytic hydrogenation gives quinolizidine.
