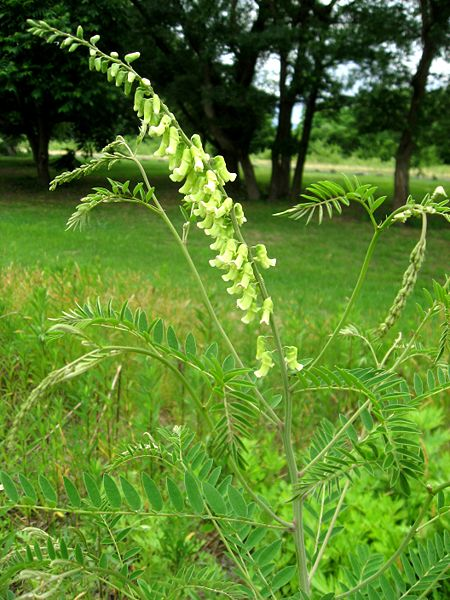

Conservation status
- Least Concern (IUCN 3.1)

Scientific classification
- Kingdom: Plantae
- Clade: Tracheophytes
- Clade: Angiosperms
- Clade: Eudicots
- Clade: Rosids
- Order: Fabales
- Family: Fabaceae
- Subfamily: Faboideae
- Genus: Sophora
- Species: S. flavescens

Binomial name
- Sophora flavescens Aiton

Synonyms
- Radiusia flavescens (Aiton) Endl.

= Sophora flavescens =

Species of legume

Sophora flavescens, the shrubby sophora, is a species of plant in the family Fabaceae. It is native to a wide area of East Asia.

== Description ==
Sophora flavescens can grow to a height of 2 m (6.6 ft). Its stem is marked with stripes and covered in soft hairs when young. The leaves are usually 20–25 cm (8–10 in) long, with lanceolate stipules and 13–25 elliptic, ovate, or lanceolate leaflets. The plant produces terminal racemes measuring 15–25 cm (6–10 in), with numerous flowers spaced widely apart. The flowers have slender pedicels and linear bracts with white, pale yellow, purple-red, or red spoon-shaped petals. It blooms from June to August and fruits from July to October.

== Distribution ==
Sophora flavescens is native to China, Mongolia, Taiwan, Japan, Korea, and the Russian Far East. It mainly grows on mountainous slopes, sandy grassland inclines, shrub forests, or around the fields, typically at elevations below 1,500 m (5,000 ft).

== Growth and cultivation ==
Sophora flavescens is an evergreen slow growing shrub growing to 1.5 m (5 ft) by 1 m (3.3 ft). It is hardy to 0–10 °F (−18 – −12 °C) and to US zone 6. The plant prefers light (sandy), medium (loamy) and heavy (clay) soils and requires well-drained soil. The plant prefers acid, neutral and basic (alkaline) soils. It cannot grow in the shade. It requires moist soil. Like many other species in the family Fabaceae, this species can fix nitrogen.

== Chemistry ==
Matrine (left) and its oxide

Chemical compounds isolated from S. flavescens include:

- Matrine and matrine oxide, quinolizidine alkaloids found in the roots
- Kushenin, a pterocarpan and isoflavonoid
- Sophoraflavanone G
- 7,9,2',4'-Tetrahydroxy-8-isopentenyl-5-methoxychalcone
- Sophoridine
- Kurarinone
- Trifolirhizin, a pterocarpan flavonoid, isolated from the roots
- 8-Prenylkaempferol, a prenylflavonoid
- Oxysophocarpine and sophocarpine, alkaloids

== Toxicity ==
Toxic effects from use of the root may include nausea, dizziness, vomiting, constipation, spasms, disturbance of speech, irregular breathing, respiratory failure and death.
