= 4H-Quinolizine =

Names
- Preferred IUPAC name 4H-Quinolizine

Identifiers
CAS Number	25002-56-6
3D model (JSmol)	Interactive image
ChEBI	CHEBI:36618
ChemSpider	7827610
PubChem CID	9548687
- InChI: InChI=1S/C9H9N/c1-3-7-10-8-4-2-6-9(10)5-1/h1-7H,8H2 Key: GDRVFDDBLLKWRI-UHFFFAOYSA-N
- SMILES: C1C=CC=C2N1C=CC=C2

Properties
Chemical formula	C_{9}H_{9}N
Molar mass	131.178 g·mol^{−1}
- Except where otherwise noted, data are given for materials in their standard state (at 25 °C [77 °F], 100 kPa). Infobox references

4H-Quinolizine is a heterocyclic compound with the formula C_{9}H_{9}N. The location of the ninth hydrogen atom defines the isomer as 4H-. The 2H-, 3H- isomers are also theoretically possible. None have been isolated, so these compounds remain of theoretical interest. These compounds structurally resemble quinoline but with nitrogen at one of the two ring fusion sites. Quinolizines feature tertiary amine at the bridge site. Although quinolizines are elusive, their saturated derivatives quinolizidines C_{9}H_{17}N are well known, being found in several alkaloids. Another class of stable derivatives are the quinolizinium cations C_{9}H_{8}N^{+}, resulting from the formal removal of hydride from quinolizines.
