= Plantify =

- Type: Incorporated, Privately owned
- Industry: E-Commerce, Plant retail
- Founded: 2011
- Founder: Peter and Susann Laughton
- Headquarters: Windsor, Berkshire, UK
- Products: Herbaceous and Perennial plants
- Number of employees: 12
- Website: plantify.co.uk

Plantify.co.uk is an online plant shop based in Windsor, Berkshire (UK) that sells a wide variety of herbaceous and perennial plants. The plant shop supplies over 3150 plants sourced from small British growers and hosts a Plant Finder encyclopedia and free garden design tool.

== History ==
Plantify.co.uk was founded in 2011 by ex-computer games developer and gardening enthusiast, Peter Laughton, who developed plantify.co.uk using gamification techniques honed in the video games business to make processes, sales and marketing more attractive to consumers, employees and suppliers. Laughton previously worked for video games developers, Electronic Arts Inc.

== Operations ==
The business operates from warehouse offices and employs operational and customer service staff, and horticultural specialists.

In 2012 the plant retailer supported the UK division of World Vision, one of the world’s leading aid agencies, to cultivate the rare Andean Lupin (Lupinus mutabilis) which the charity featured in its Royal Horticultural Society (RHS) Chelsea Flower Show 2012 garden designed by RHS gold medal winning garden designers, FlemonsWarlandDesign

At the 2012 RHS Hampton Court Palace Flower Show, two gardens featured plants supplied by plantify.co.uk. The Badger Beer Garden, and The 'Bridge Over Troubled Water' garden designed by Bestique's garden designer, Anoushka Feiler won three awards; Best in Show, a gold medal and the People's Choice award.

== Media Coverage ==
has been featured in newspapers including the Saturday Telegraph and Sunday Telegraph, women’s and gardening magazines and on radio. Independent reviews through blogs have also featured plantify.co.uk from both amateur and professional gardeners alike.
