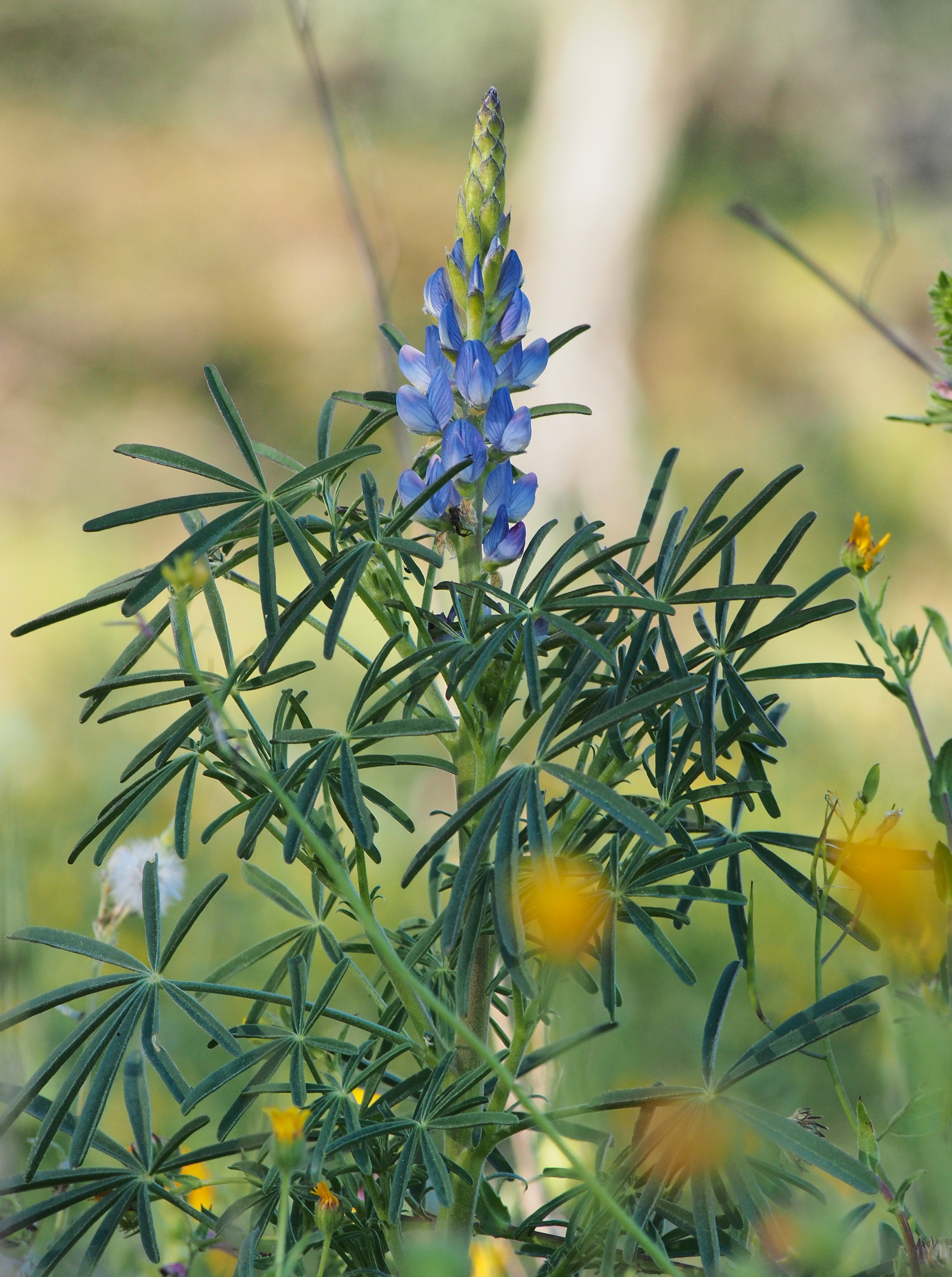

Scientific classification
- Kingdom: Plantae
- Clade: Embryophytes
- Clade: Tracheophytes
- Clade: Angiosperms
- Clade: Eudicots
- Clade: Rosids
- Order: Fabales
- Family: Fabaceae
- Subfamily: Faboideae
- Genus: Lupinus
- Species: L. angustifolius

Binomial name
- Lupinus angustifolius L.

= Lupinus angustifolius =

Species of legume

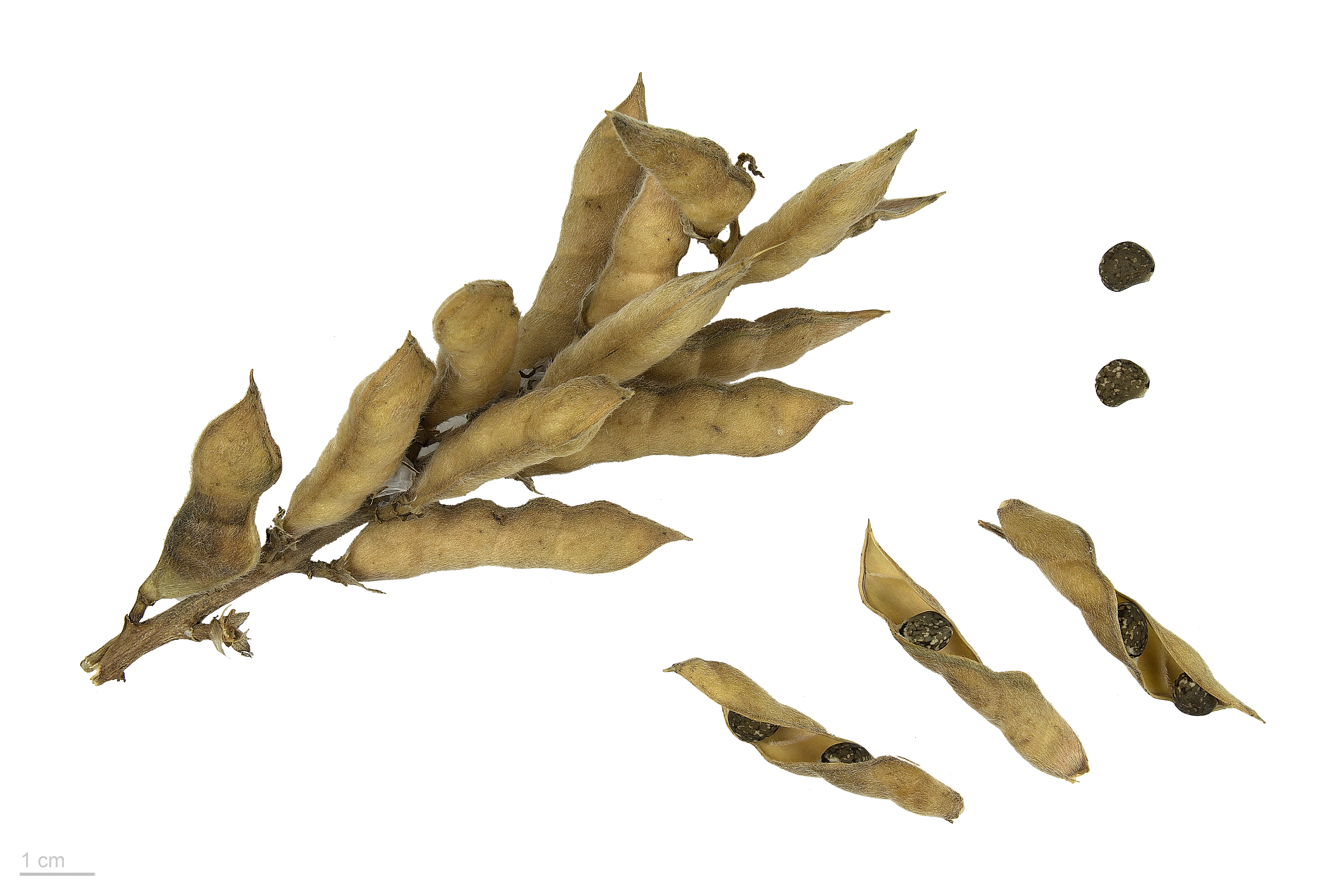
Lupinus angustifolius - MHNT

Lupinus angustifolius is a species of lupin known by many common names, including narrowleaf lupin, narrow-leaved lupin and blue lupin. It is native to Eurasia and northern Africa and naturalized in parts of Australia and North America. It has been cultivated for over 6000 years as a food crop for its edible legume seeds, as a fodder for livestock and for green manure.

== Biology ==
Like other legumes, the narrow-leaved lupin fixes nitrogen in a symbiotic interaction with different bacteria in the rhizosphere. Bacteria living in this rhizosphere include Bradyrhizobium lupinii or the newly discovered species Kribbella lupini. In some places these bacteria are not native to the soil and need to be inocculated onto the seed for the lupins to have a nitrogen fixing effect. It was found that Lupins accumulate on average 195.4 kg N/h, 80 % of which were fixed from the atmosphere.

The narrow-leaved lupin is an erect, branching herb sometimes exceeding one meter. There are reduced-branching cultivars. Each palmate leaf is divided into 5 to 9 linear leaflets under 4 centimeters long. The herbage is slightly hairy in some areas. The inflorescence bears many flowers in shades of blue, violet, pink, or white. The fruit is a legume pod containing seeds of varying colors from dark gray to brown to white, or speckled or mottled. Lupinus angustifolius has a high content of alkaloids, e.g. lupanin or angustifolin. However, cultivars with a low alkaloid content have been bred. These low alkaloid cultivars are called sweet lupins, such as the Australian Sweet Lupin.

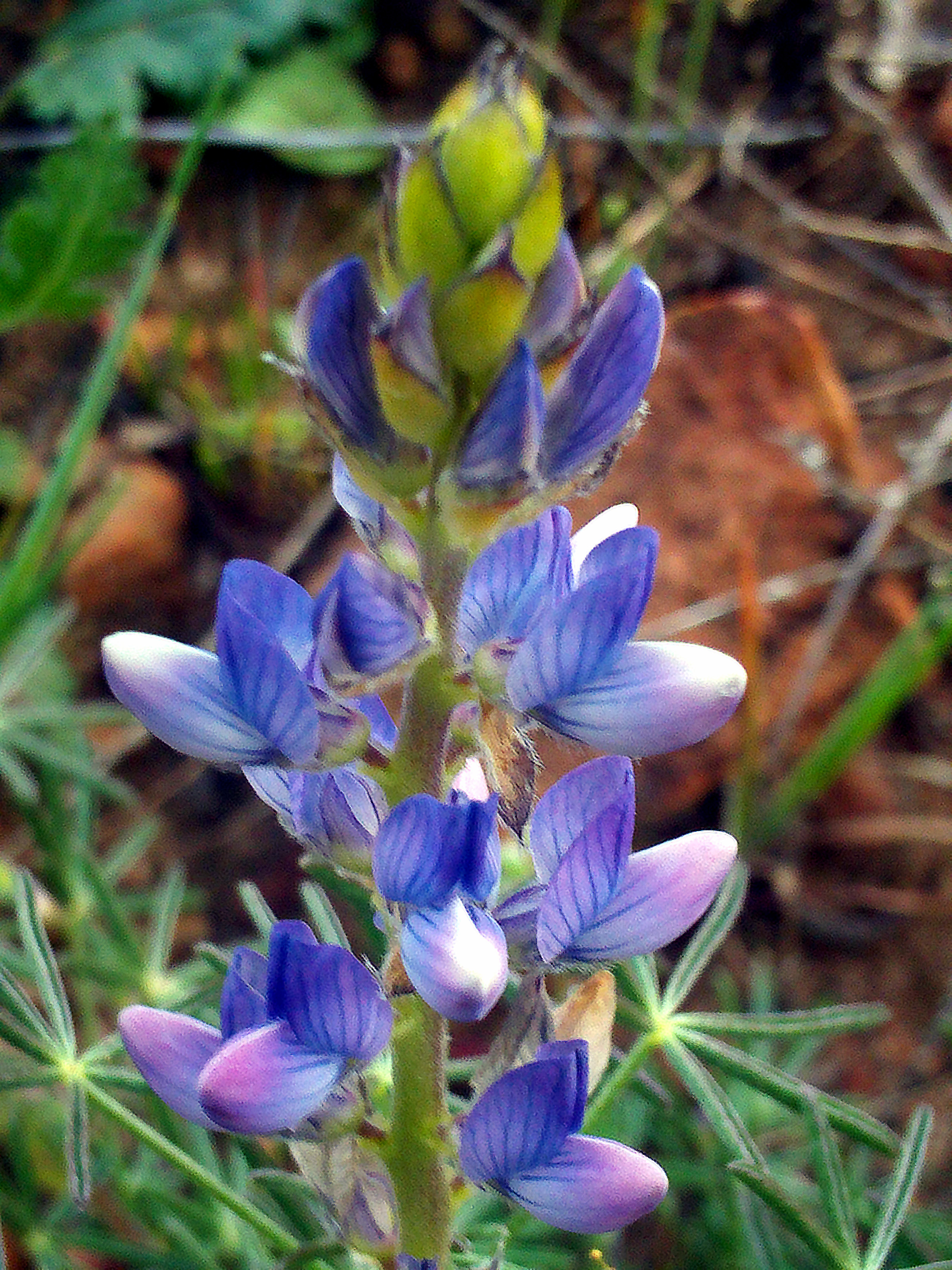

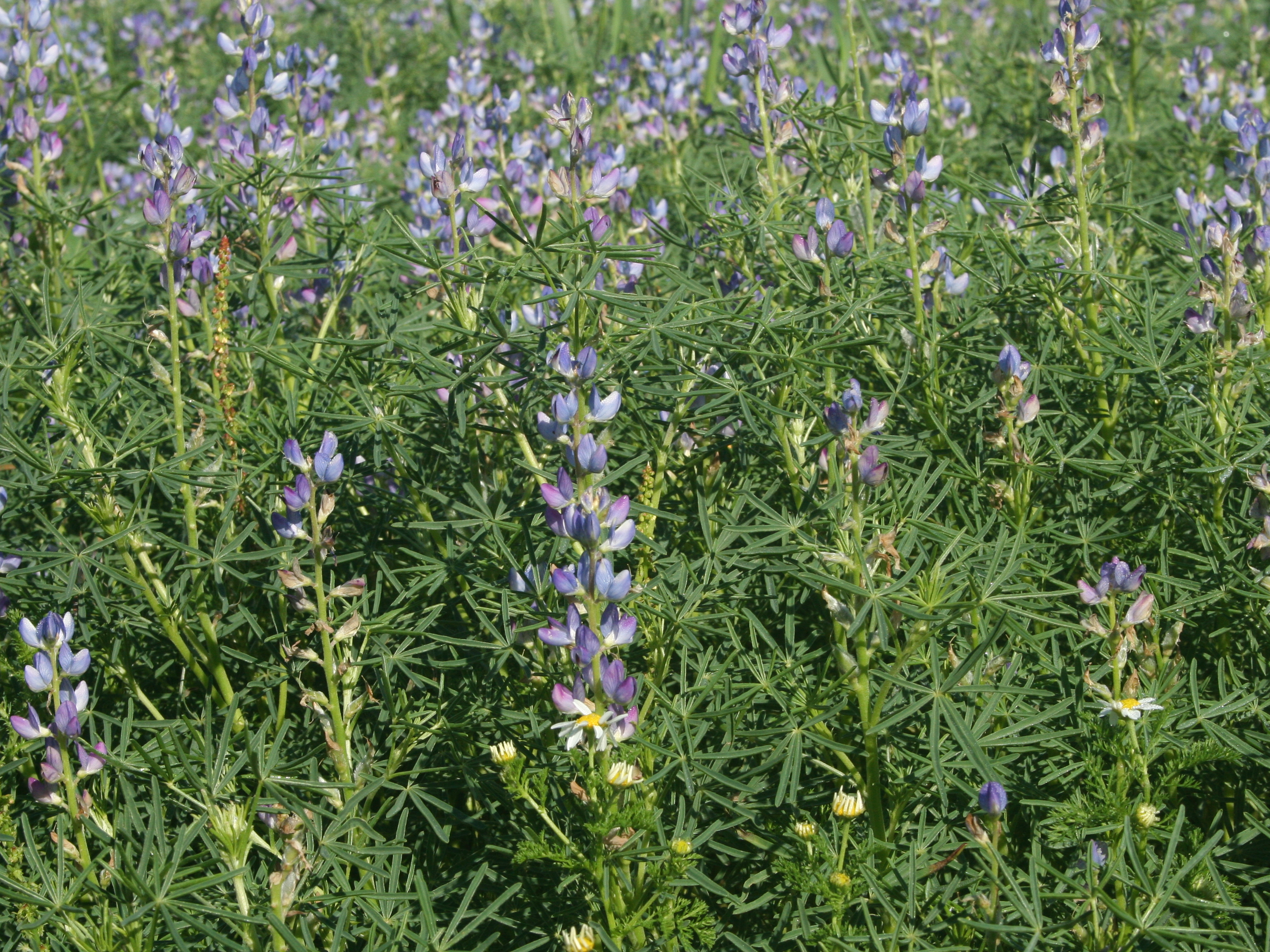

== Domestication and Modern Use ==
The process of domestication for narrow-leaved lupine presumably started in the 1930‒1940s, when the discovered alkaloid-free mutants enabled plant breeders in Germany and Sweden to develop the first forage cultivars. The first fully domesticated varieties of L. angustifolius were developed in the 1960s by John Gladstones at the University of Western Australia. Subsequently, the Australian sweet and non-shattering L. angustifolius genetics has been utilised by plant breeders in Germany, Poland, Belarus and Russia to breed sweet grain varieties suitable for northern European conditions, including enhanced flowering time regulation, more uniform maturation, greater tolerance to cooler environments, and resistance to fungal diseases. Australia adopted the common name 'Australian sweet lupin' to emphasise that Australian narrow-leafed lupin has alkaloid levels within the Food Standards Australia and New Zealand standard of seed with 0.02% total alkaloids or below.

Blue Lupin production expanded rapidly in Western Australia through the 1980s and 1990s, but persistent weed problems and declining market prices made lupin cultivation less profitable and more difficult to manage. Consequently, many growers switched to canola (or fallow), leading to a sharp drop in production from a peak of 1.5 million tonnes in 1999 to just under 300,000 tonnes in 2012. In 2023, Western Australia produced 400,000 tonnes of blue lupin.

In Poland, the second largest producer of lupins after Australia, narrow-leaved lupins have gained importance in recent years. In Russia, the area cultivated with narrow-leaved lupins reached 78,971 hectares in 2019.

== Agronomy ==
The narrow-leaved lupin is sown as early as possible in the spring, to have the growing season as long as possible. Another reason for early sowing is its sensitivity to high temperature in spring. Lupins react with a higher yield loss, when they are sown late, than other crops (e.g. cereals) do. The optimum seed density depends on the site yield potential and is generally higher in non-branching cultivars than in branching ones. The variance is high, 14 to 138 plants per m^{2} are an optimal plant density, depending on the yield potential of the site. On most grounds, a plant density around 80 plants per m^{2} would be the optimum.

Lupins are usually sown with technique used for cereals in a depth of about 5 cm.

The narrow-leaved lupin needs to be harvested as soon as the grain reaches a moisture of about 12%. The straw usually isn't ripened at this point, but further delay of harvest would increase losses from shattering of the pods and lodging. The harvest is done with machinery used for cereals. Swathing is not widely applied. However, it can be a good alternative to reduce harvest losses in case harvest is delayed.

The disease and weed spectrum of the narrow-leaved lupin is different from most major crops and it is able to improve the soil (see Use). Therefore, it is a valuable partner in intensive crop rotations.

In the main cultivation area in Australia lupin yields typically reach 3-3.5 t/ha. Yields in Europe are less stable. They range from 2-4 t/ha. The reasons for which are mainly environmental. With higher rainfalls being disadvantageous for a successful lupin cultivation

== Pests and Diseases ==
L. angustifolius is affected by various insect pests, viral diseases and fungal pathogens, which can negatively affect the final yield. Narrow-leaved lupin plants synthesize quinolizidine alkaloids (QAs) as secondary metabolites within their leaves to protect themselves against herbivores, but a few insect species have adapted to tolerate those substances.

=== Insect pests ===
Lupin Root Weevils (Charagmus spp., Curculionidae: Sitonini) are species of beetles widely spread in Europe that can be very damaging to lupin plants. The adult beetles feed on the leaves of the crop, usually not causing significant damage. The most damaging are the larvae of lupin root weevils that can infect and feed on the root nodules. The damage to roots can reduce the plant's ability to fix nitrogen and it also enables soil pathogens to enter the roots. Lupin root weevils can be controlled through chemical control, tillage and use of biological control agents.

The lupin aphid (Macrosiphum albifrons) have evolved to tolerate QAs and feed on high-alkaloid lupins, while other aphid species mostly feed on sweet lupin cultivars with low alkaloid content. Lupin plants are most vulnerable to M. albifrons during the budding and flowering stage. Heavy infestations during flowering can cause poor pod set or, in severe cases, no development of pods. Control methods include insecticides, high sowing densities and narrow row spacing to discourage aphid landing, and biological control. However, chemical control is often not economical and biocontrol agents can effectively control aphid populations only under low to moderate infestation levels.

=== Viral diseases ===
M. albifrons and other aphids are a vector of bean yellow mosaic virus (BYMV) and cucumber mosaic virus (CMV). CMV can be seed-borne in narrow-leaved lupin, meaning the virus can infect developing seeds and survive in them for a long time. The plants that grow from such seeds will also be infected and serve as sources of further disease spread via aphids. BYMV is not seed-borne in the narrow-leaved lupin and can only be transmitted by aphids feeding on already infected plants.

Because both diseases are mostly transmitted by aphids, controlling aphid populations and removing weeds from which the aphids can acquire the disease can help control CMV and BYMV. Spread of seed-borne CMV can be minimized by using certified virus-free seeds.

=== Fungal pathogens ===
Narrow-leafed lupin can be affected by lupin anthracnose, a major fungal disease caused by the pathogenic fungus Colletotrichum lupini. The disease can lead to substantial yield losses. The pathogen is transmitted primarily through affected seeds, but is also spread within the field by spores dispersed by rain splash from lesions on infected plants. Typical symptoms include twisting and bending of stems and in later stages necrotic lesions.

The use of disease-free seed is a key management practice, although even very low levels of seed infection (as little as 0.01%) can already cause the disease. Fungicides can be used to control the disease through seed coating or foliar application. The most promising way of combating anthracnose in lupin is using resistant varieties, which can achieve as much as double the yield as susceptible varieties. Several single dominant resistance genes have been identified and there are resistant varieties, such as 'Tanjil' and 'Mandelup', available.

== Use ==
The plant is used as a green manure or as a grain legume for animal feed or human consumption. Through its ability to fix nitrogen and its low nutrient requirement this plant is suitable to be planted on exhausted fields as a soil improver. Additionally, lupins have strong roots, that can reduce the compaction of a soil.

The whole plant, including the seeds, is widely used as a fodder for livestock, due to its high protein and energy content. Lupins contain high levels of fermentable carbohydrates and low levels of starch and are, therefore, an adequate ruminant feed. But lupins are a valuable feed for monogastric animals as well, because of the high digestibility of the lupin nitrogen and the low level of protease inhibitors.

Lupins are mainly consumed as fermented foods, bread and pasta products, milk products or sprouts. As of 2020, only 4% of lupin were consumed by humans, with the majority used as stock feed. Lupin beans are growing in use as a plant-based protein source in the world marketplace.

== Genomics ==
This species of lupin had its genome sequenced in May 2013. It was sequenced due to the interest in low alkaloid mutants as a food crop. L. angustifolius has a protein content of 35–40% in the seeds thus for providing protein to people of the world it is of high interest. Currently lupin is grown in Australia and sold under the name "Australian sweet lupin". The objective was to figure out how agronomic traits, low alkaloid traits, and protein content are manifested in the genome. The genome was sequenced in two cultivars, the poorly adapted tanjil and the better adapted unicrop. The genome was sequenced as such; whole genome shotgun sequencing dataset for this species with 26.9x (average amount of overlapping scaffolds) coverage of the genome, then NGS-based RAD-sequencing technology was used to obtain 8,244 sequence-defined markers. A total of 4,214 scaffolds from the genome sequence was assembled and aligned with the genetic map.

=== Breeding Goals ===
Lupinus angustifolius is currently subject of multiple breeding programs. Main focusses are a low alkaloid content, as alkaloids give a bitter taste to the seed and can be poisonous in high amounts. In Europe the threshold for human consumption lies at 200 ppm, while it is at 500 ppm for animal feed. Not all varieties achieve such values constantly. Modern top varieties reach 100 ppm while wild types are at levels of 100'000 ppm. The Australian variety Geebung even reaches contents as low as 8 ppm. Australian varieties can, however, not be used in temperate climates.

Another important breeding goal is the resistance against anthracnose. Which was found to not be negatively influenced by low alkaloid contents. Two major resistance genes have been characterised: Lanr1, present in the Australian variety 'Tanjil', and AnMan, found in the variety 'Mandelup'. Varieties containing these resistance genes exhibit significant resistance to anthracnose.

Important for the processing of lupin seeds are also the protein contents which are currently at 30-45% in the seeds. The protein content is on a similar level to soy with a comparable amino acid composition.
