= Quinolizidine alkaloids =

Class of chemical compounds

Quinolizidine, the parent compound of the quinolizidine alkaloids.

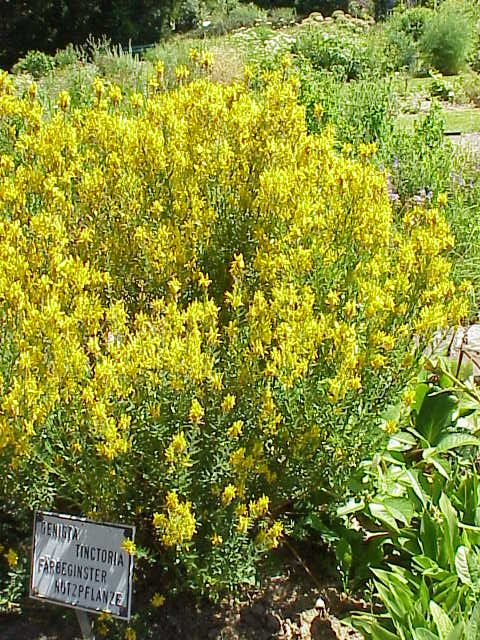
Dyer's broom (Genista tinctoria)

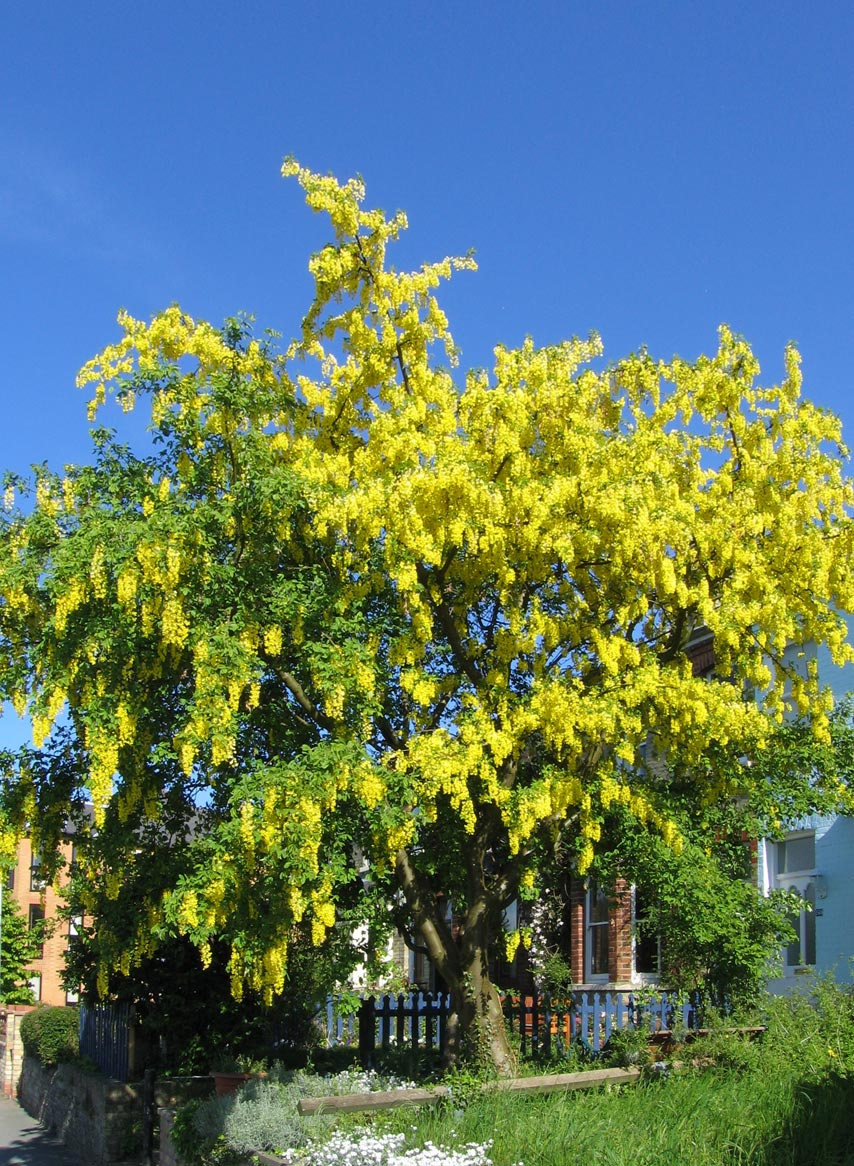
Common Golden Rain (Laburnum anagyroides)

Quinolizidine alkaloids are natural products that have a quinolizidine structure; this includes the lupine alkaloids.

== Occurrence ==
Quinolizidine alkaloids can be found in the plant family of legumes, especially in papilionaceous plants. While the lupine alkaloids (following their name) can be found in lupines, tinctorin, for example, was isolated from the dyer's broom.

== Examples ==
More than 200 quinolizidine alkaloids are known which can be classified into 6 structural types:

- the lupinine type with 34 known structures, including lupinine and its derivatives
- the camoensine type with 6 known structures, including camoensin
- the spartein type with 66 structures, including sparteine, lupanine, angustifoline
- the α-pyridone type with 25 structures, including anagyrine and cytisine
- the matrine type with 31 structures, including matrine
- and the ormosanin type with 19 structures, including ormosanine.

(–)-lupinine

(–)-sparteine

(–)-lupanine

(–)-anagyrine

(+)-matrine

== Properties ==
Cytisine is the toxic main alkaloid of laburnum. Similar to nicotine, it has a stimulating to hallucinogenic effect in low doses and a respiratory paralysing effect in higher doses. Cytisine and matrine are active ingredients of the Sophora beans from Mexico and the cow Seng and Shinkyogan drugs from China and Japan.

Quinolizidine alkaloids defend plants against pests and diseases and breeding to reduce QA concentrations lowers these resistances. They have various effects on warm-blooded animals and lead to poisoning of grazing livestock (sheep and cattle). Cytisin and anagyrin are particularly responsible for this. The effects of poisoning are stimulation, coordination disorders, shortness of breath, cramps and finally death from respiratory paralysis. Anagyrin acts teratogenic. The only quinolizidine alkaloid used therapeutically is sparteine, which has an antiarrhythmic and labor-promoting effect.
