= Blue lupine =

Blue lupine is a common name for several plants and may refer to:

- Lupinus angustifolius, a European species with edible seeds
- Lupinus perennis, native to eastern North America
- Lupinus pilosus, endemic to the eastern Mediterranean Basin
