= Oxymatrine =

Names
- IUPAC name 1λ^{5}-Matridine-1,15-dione
- Systematic IUPAC name (4^{1}S,7aS,13aR,13bR)-Dodecahydro-1H,10H-4λ^{5}-dipyrido[2,1-f:3′,2′,1′-ij][1,6]naphthyridine-4,10(5H)-dione
- Other names Matrine oxide, matrine N-oxide, matrine 1-oxide

Identifiers
CAS Number	16837-52-8
3D model (JSmol)	Interactive image
ChemSpider	102808
DrugBank	DB16276
ECHA InfoCard	100.106.342
EC Number	605-514-4
KEGG	C10749
PubChem CID	24864132
UNII	85U4C366QS
CompTox Dashboard (EPA)	DTXSID40937482
- InChI: InChI=1S/C15H24N2O2/c18-14-7-1-6-13-12-5-3-9-17(19)8-2-4-11(15(12)17)10-16(13)14/h11-13,15H,1-10H2/t11-,12+,13+,15-,17+/m0/s1 Key: XVPBINOPNYFXID-JARXUMMXSA-N
- SMILES: [O-][N+]43[C@@H]2[C@@H]([C@@H]1N(C(=O)CCC1)C[C@@H]2CCC3)CCC4

Properties
Chemical formula	C_{15}H_{24}N_{2}O_{2}
Molar mass	264.369 g·mol^{−1}

Hazards
- GHS labelling
Pictograms	(GHS07: Exclamation mark)
Signal word	Warning
Hazard statements	H302
Precautionary statements	P264, P270, P301+P317, P330, P501
- Except where otherwise noted, data are given for materials in their standard state (at 25 °C [77 °F], 100 kPa). Infobox references

Oxymatrine (matrine oxide, matrine N-oxide, matrine 1-oxide) is one of many quinolizidine alkaloid compounds extracted from the root of Sophora flavescens, a Chinese herb. It is very similar in structure to matrine, which has one less oxygen atom, and oxymatrine is partially metabolized to matrine in the human gut. Oxymatrine has a variety of effects in vitro and in animal models, including protection against apoptosis, tumor and fibrotic tissue development, and inflammation. Furthermore, oxymatrine has been shown to decrease cardiac ischemia (decreased blood perfusion), myocardial injury, arrhythmias (irregular heartbeats), and improve heart failure by increasing cardiac function.

== Role in cardiac fibrosis ==
Recent research has shown that oxymatrine prevents cardiac fibrosis in rats. The development of fibrotic tissue in the heart occurs when fibroblasts produce excessive amounts of collagen (particularly types I and III), which accumulate and deposit in the heart. The excessive transformation to fibrotic tissue negatively affects the function and structure of the heart. Additionally, excessive amounts of collagen in the ventricles lead to alterations in gene expression, deposition of extracellular matrix, wall thickening, and ventricular remodeling in a manner that promotes dysfunction.

The mechanism by which oxymatrine may inhibit fibrosis is still unidentified. One theory that has been proposed is that oxymatrine inhibits a key signaling pathway involved in collagen production. One of the main signaling receptors involved in this pathway is the TGF-β1 co-receptor (complex of type I and type II receptors), which acts as a trans-membrane protein serine/threonine kinase. A receptor assembly factor first activates TGF-β1 type I receptor and then type II. Receptor I is then able to bind proteins Smad2 and Smad3, which form a complex with Smad4. This complex accumulates in the nucleus, and binds to promoter elements of the collagen gene, stimulating the production of collagen.

In rats, oxymatrine also inhibits the expression of the Smad3 ligand which binds to TGF-β1 type I and activates the signal transduction pathway. A dose–response relationship was observed with increasing intragastric concentrations of oxymatrine resulting in decreased expression of Smad3. By inhibiting this pathway, less collagen was produced and deposited in the heart, preventing the formation of cardiac fibrosis. Huang and Chen (2013) claim that oxymatrine may even be involved in inhibiting the expression of TGF-β1 receptors, which would further support that oxymatrine attenuates the signal transduction pathway involved in collagen production. They also reported that inhibition of the TGF-β1 receptor may also prevent ventricular remodeling.

== Future studies ==
Effects of oxymatrine on heart disease in humans has not been studied and the long term side-effects of clinical oxymatrine use have not yet been identified.

In a 2010 study, Oxymatrine was shown to inhibit the development of morphine-induced tolerance associated with decreased expression of P-glycoprotein in rats.
