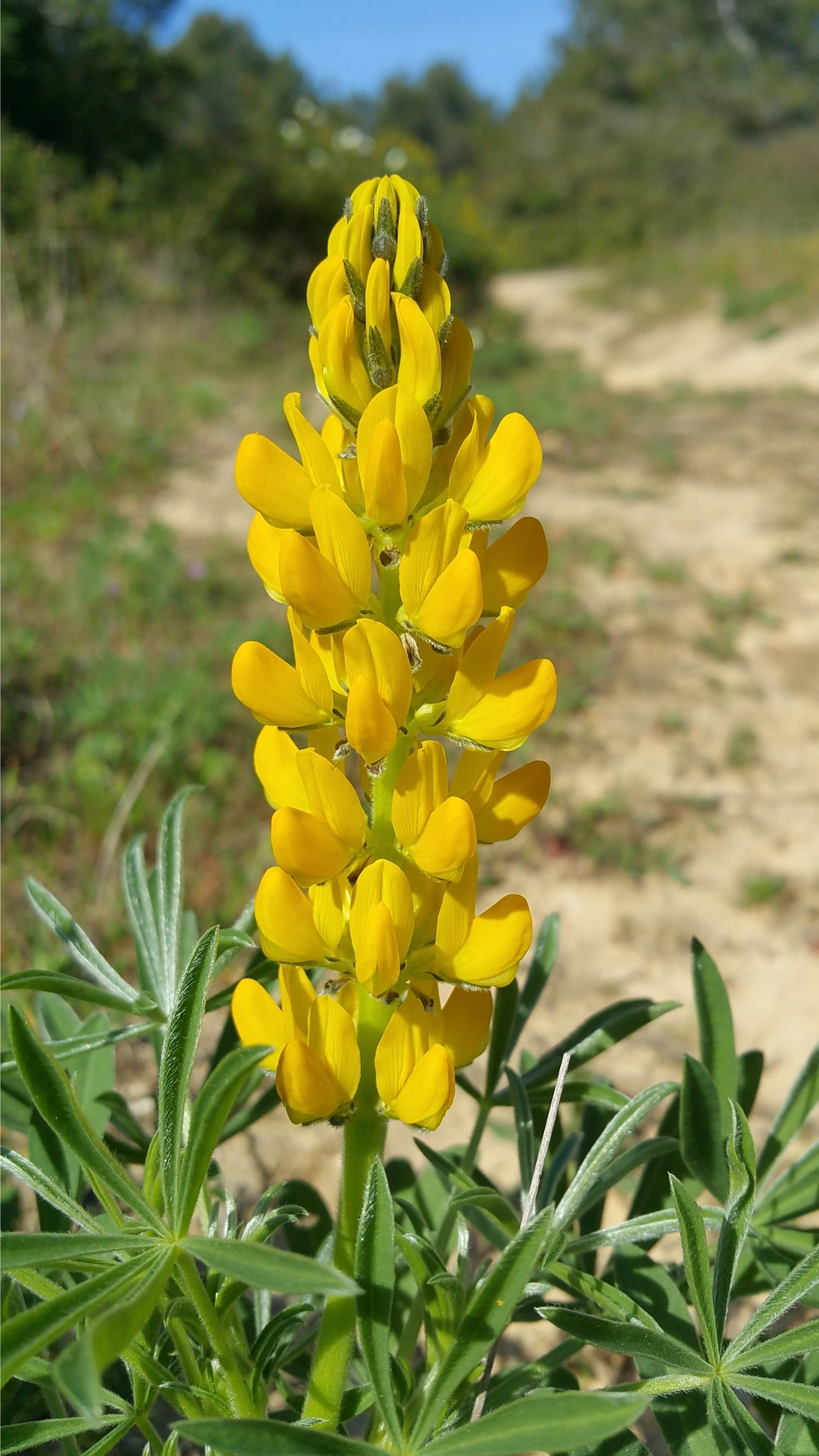
- Lupinus luteus in Algarve, Portugal

Scientific classification
- Kingdom: Plantae
- Clade: Tracheophytes
- Clade: Angiosperms
- Clade: Eudicots
- Clade: Rosids
- Order: Fabales
- Family: Fabaceae
- Subfamily: Faboideae
- Genus: Lupinus
- Species: L. luteus

Binomial name
- Lupinus luteus L.

= Lupinus luteus =

Species of flowering plant

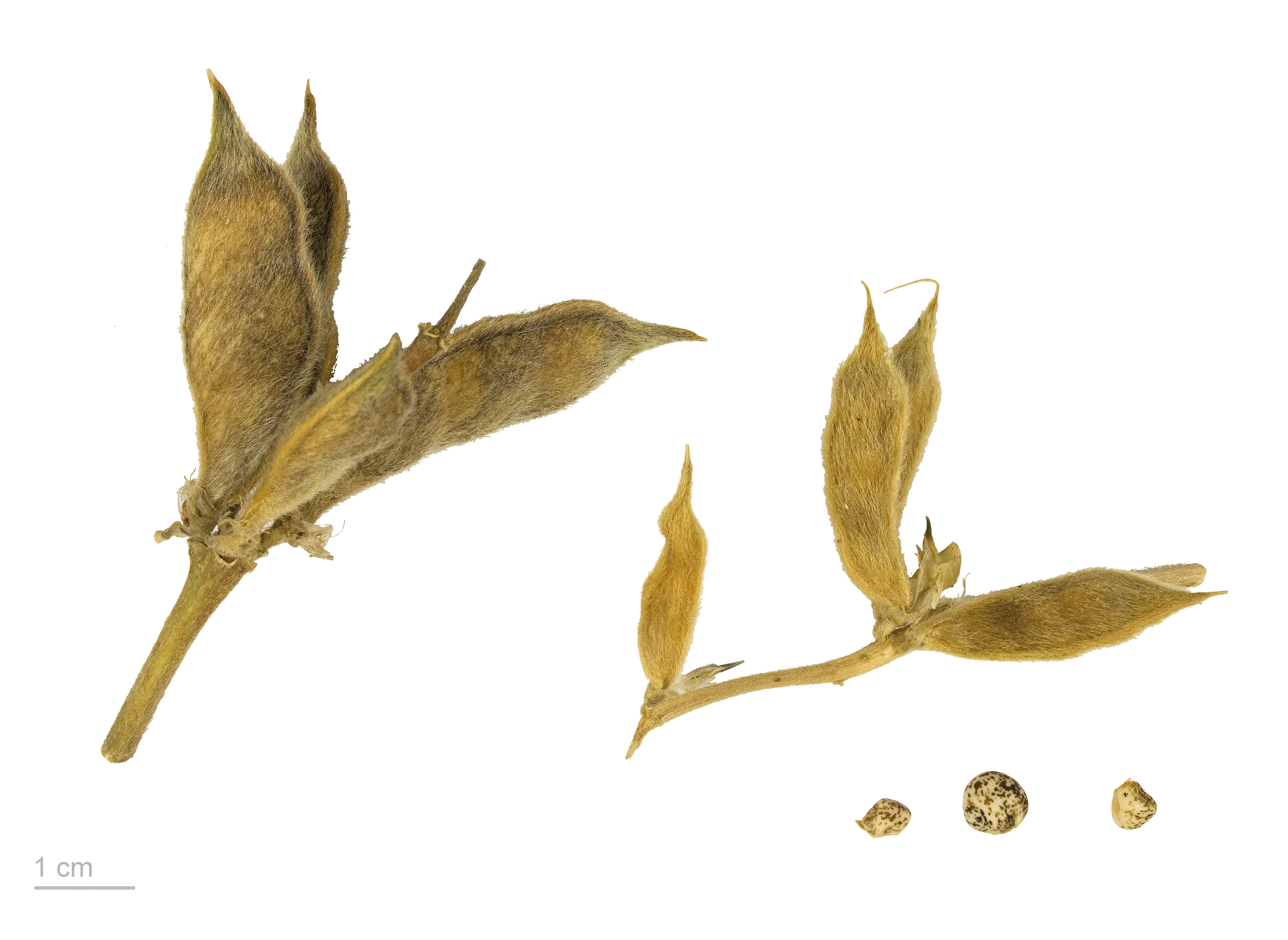
Pods and seeds - MHNT

Lupinus luteus is known as annual yellow-lupin, European yellow lupin or yellow lupin. It is native to the western Mediterranean region from Portugal east to Italy. It is an annual plant growing to around 80 cm tall with hairy stems. The leaves are palmately compound, with 7–11 leaflets, the leaflets 6 cm long by 12 mm broad. The flower are bright yellow, 13–16 mm long, borne on spikes are not continuous, but in regularly spaced verticillasters on the stem.

== Distribution ==
It occurs on mild sandy and volcanic soils. As a wild plant, it is widespread over the coastal area in the western part of the Iberian Peninsula, on the islands of Corsica, Sardinia and Sicily and in Southern Italy. It has become naturalised in northwest Africa in Morocco, Tunisia, in Europe widely, and in Algeria, Syria, Israel and Lebanon in southwest Asia, and more distantly also in Ethiopia, India, and elsewhere. It is cultivated in Northern Europe, including Belarus and Ukraine as well as, on a smaller scale, in Western Australia and South Africa.

Using combinations of such characters as the colour of the corolla, the carina's edge, vegetative organs and seeds, 18 varieties, 4 subvarieties and 6 forms have been identified.

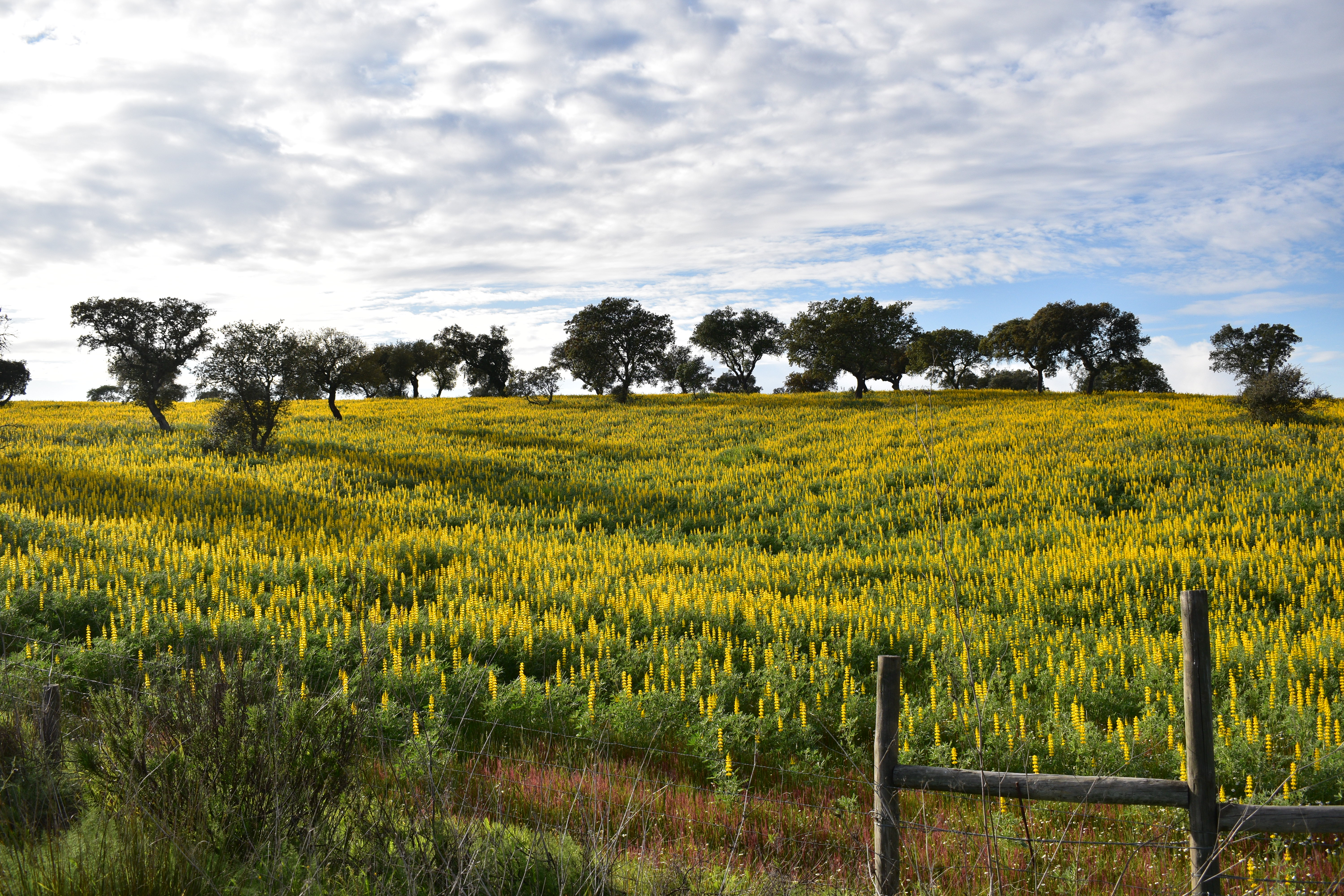
Lupinus luteus crop in Portugal

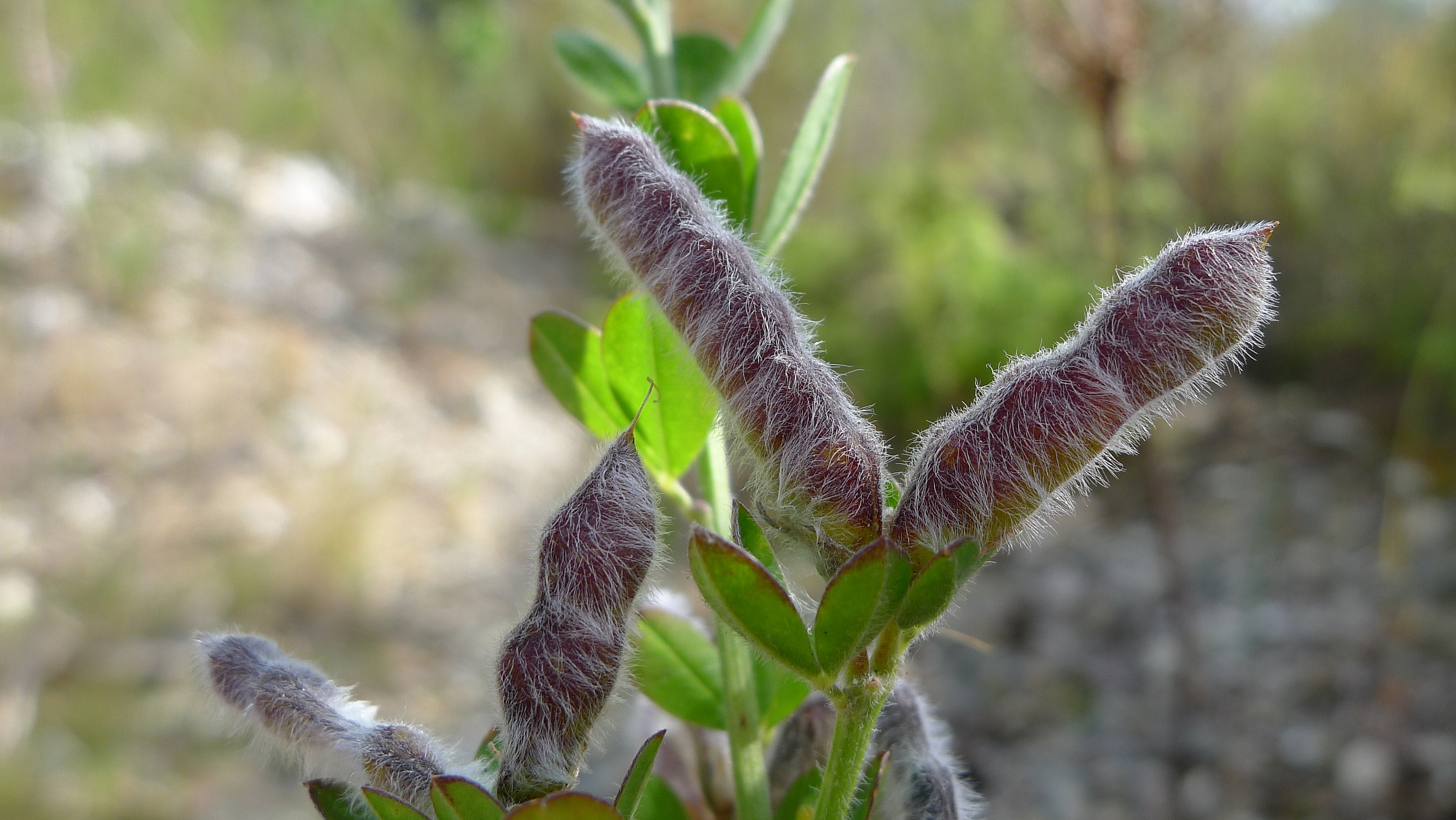
Fruit

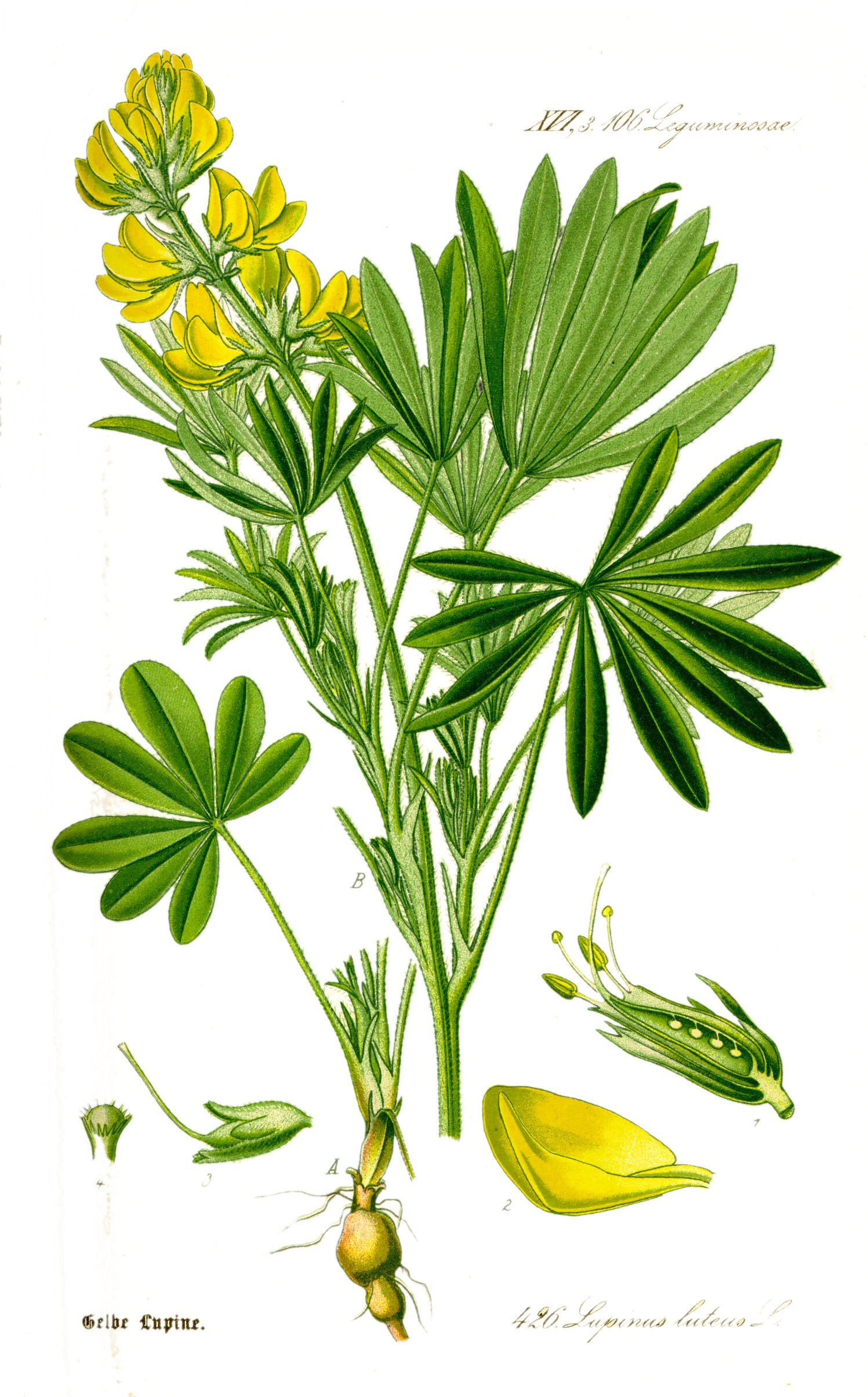
Illustration

== Uses ==
The yellow seeds, known as lupin beans, were once a common food of the Mediterranean basin. Today they are primarily eaten as a pickled snack food, and cultivated to feed livestock and poultry. It is also used as an ornamental plant.
