= Kushenin =

Names
- IUPAC name (6aR,11aR)-8-Methoxy-6a,11a-dihydro-6H-[1]benzofuro[3,2-c]chromene-3,9-diol

Identifiers
CAS Number	99217-66-0
3D model (JSmol)	Interactive image
ChemSpider	10289951
PubChem CID	21676223
- InChI: InChI=1S/C16H14O5/c1-19-15-5-10-11-7-20-13-4-8(17)2-3-9(13)16(11)21-14(10)6-12(15)18/h2-6,11,16-18H,7H2,1H3/t11-,16-/m0/s1 Key: NYGZYUAVZPIKBZ-ZBEGNZNMSA-N
- SMILES: COC1=C(C=C2C(=C1)[C@@H]3COC4=C([C@@H]3O2)C=CC(=C4)O)O

Properties
Chemical formula	C_{16}H_{14}O_{5}
Molar mass	286.283 g·mol^{−1}
- Except where otherwise noted, data are given for materials in their standard state (at 25 °C [77 °F], 100 kPa). Infobox references

Kushenin is a pterocarpan, a type of furano-isoflavonoid, found in Sophora flavescens.
