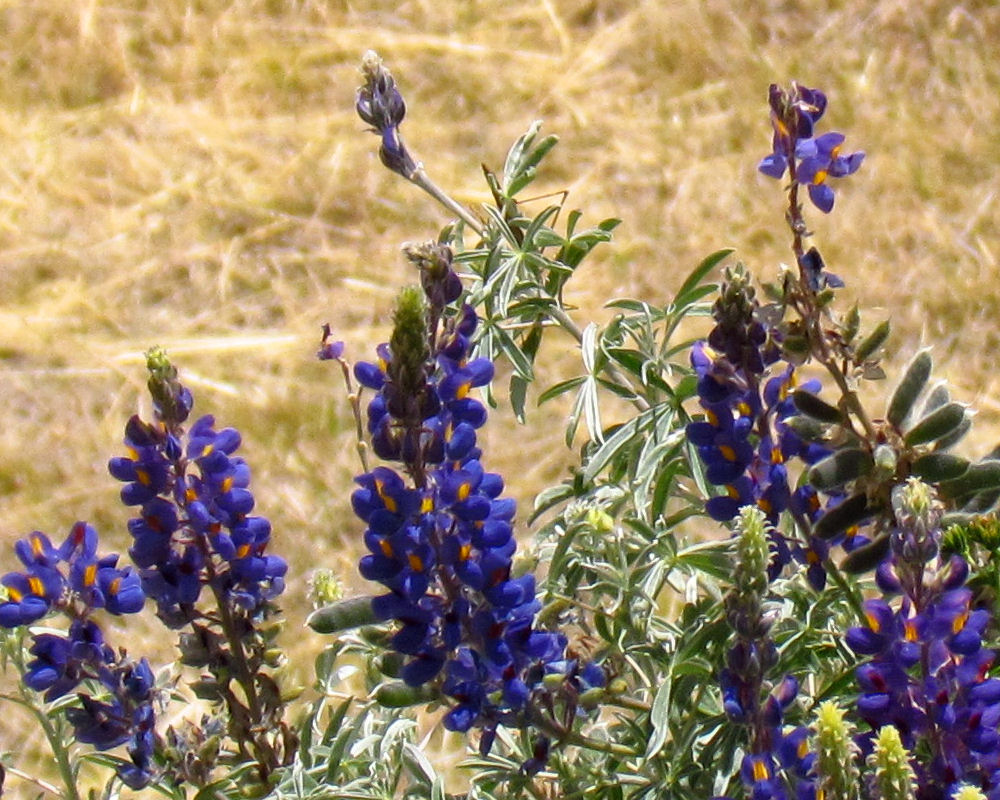
- Pisac, Peru

Scientific classification
- Kingdom: Plantae
- Clade: Embryophytes
- Clade: Tracheophytes
- Clade: Angiosperms
- Clade: Eudicots
- Clade: Rosids
- Order: Fabales
- Family: Fabaceae
- Subfamily: Faboideae
- Genus: Lupinus
- Subgenus: Lupinus subg. Platycarpos
- Species: L. mutabilis

Binomial name
- Lupinus mutabilis Sweet

Synonyms
- Lupinus cruckshankii Hook

= Lupinus mutabilis =

Species of plant

Lupinus mutabilis is a species of lupin grown in the Andes, mainly for its edible bean. Vernacular names include tarwi (in Quechua II, pronounced tarhui), chocho, altramuz, Andean lupin, South American lupin, Peruvian field lupin, and pearl lupin.

The nutrient-rich beans are high in protein and a source of vegetable oil. Their bitter flavor has made them relatively unknown outside the Andes, but the responsible alkaloids can be removed. Like other species of lupin beans, it is expanding in use as a plant-based protein.

== Description ==
L. mutabilis is an annual plant. The stem is hollow and highly branched. The plant's height reaches from 0.5 to 2.8 metres (1 1/2 to 9 ft), depending on the environmental conditions and the genomic properties. Due to the high vegetative growth, species from northern South America are taller than those from the southern Andean region. L. mutabilis has a strong taproot reaching 3 metres (3 yd) length. Like all Leguminosae, secondary roots build nodules containing bacteria for nitrogen fixation. The leaves are palmate and have a typical appearance: one leaf is divided into five to twelve leaflets with an oval or lanceolate form. The form is typical for Faboideaes.

The corolla reaches 1–2 cm (3/8–3/4 in) and contains five petals. Variation in coloration is high and reaches from white to purple. The white coloration is recessive to purple. The fruit is a 5–12 cm (2–5 in) long pod, depending on the amount of seed. One pod contains on average 2–3 seeds, but can have up to 9 seeds per pod. The thousand-seed weight is around 200 grams (7.1 oz).

Its highly variable genome contains 2n = 48 chromosomes, which leads to significant differences in morphology. Several architectural types of L. mutabilis exist. The most common is the branching in V-form, which has the highest biomass production. The basal branching type has the positive feature that its infructescence is at the same level. This species is preferably promoted because of its early ripening, stability, and homogeneity in seed quality. The growing cycle varies from 150 to 360 days, depending on the genotype, altitude, and environmental conditions. Phenological phases are emergence, first true leaf, formation of the raceme on the central stem, flowering, podding, pod ripening, and physiological maturity.

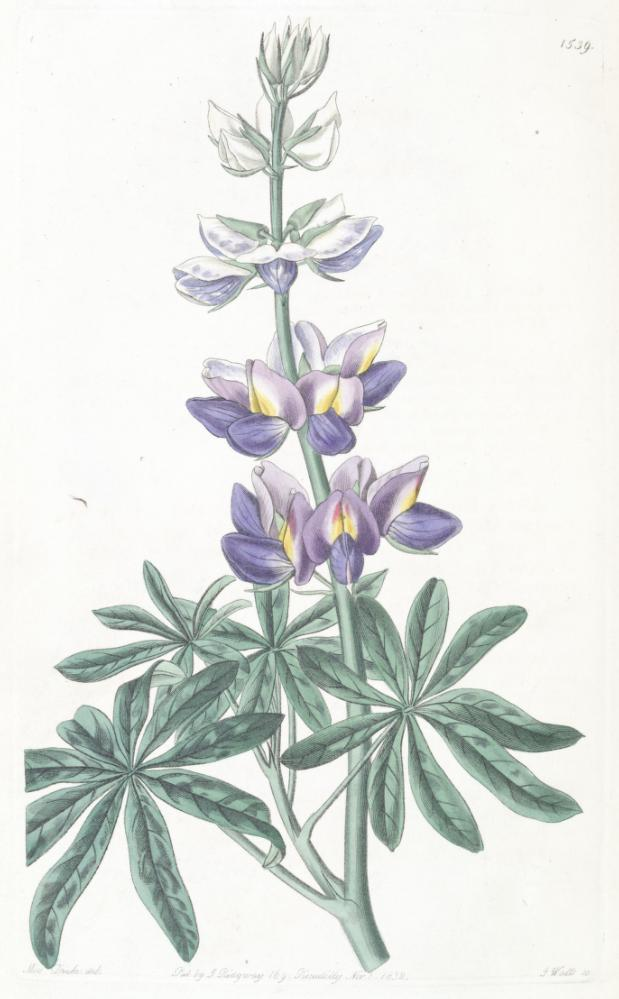
Illustration

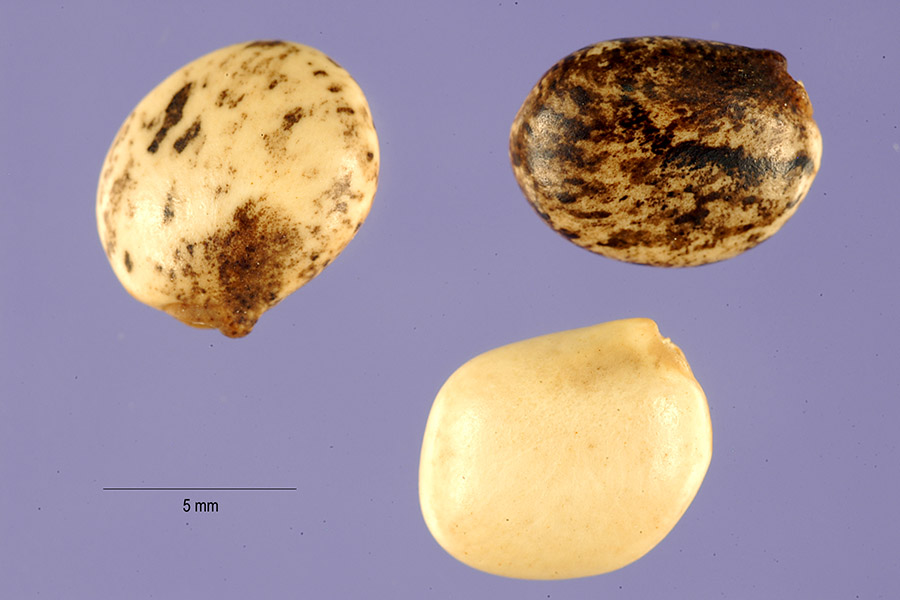
Seeds close up

== Origin and distribution ==
The origin of L. mutabilis has been identified in the Andean region of Ecuador, Peru, and Bolivia. In this area, the greatest genetic variability of this species was found. The plant has been domesticated for over 1,500 years because of its high protein content.

== Cultivation ==
=== Soil and climate requirements ===
L. mutabilis is a crop for cool climates and exists mainly in valleys at high altitudes, such as the Andes at tropical latitudes. The crop can be grown at an altitude that ranges from 800 to 3,000 m (2,600 to 9,800 ft). The crop withstands exceptional levels of drought. Mature plants are resistant to frost, whereas seedlings are sensitive to low temperatures.

=== Cultivation technique ===
Sowing

In traditional farming practices, minimum tilling is done before sowing. 100–120 kg/ha (89–107 lb/acre) of unselected seeds is sown.

Improved cultivation practices:

It is recommended to apply 80 kg (180 lb) phosphorus and 60 kg (130 lb) of potassium as fertilization before sowing. The sowing of 90 kg (200 lb) selected seeds in a distance of 60–80 cm (24–31 in), either by hand or by seed drill, follows. Plants germinate fast due to the high-fat content in the seeds.

Crop rotation aspects

Early varieties of L. mutabilis, with a growing period of about 150 days, can be cultivated in rotation with potatoes and cereals. Nematode disease of potato can be controlled by alkaloids when cultivated after L. mutabilis.

Harvest

In traditional farming practices, harvest occurs when plants have reached full maturity and the water content of seeds is between 8–12%. From peasant plots average yield is about 500–1,000 kg (1,100–2,200 lb) per hectare under suitable conditions yield reaches up to 3,500 kg (7,700 lb) per hectare.

Disease control

Alkaloids can act as pesticides, but breeding goals aim to achieve a low alkaloid content. Therefore, other disease control methods must be applied. Since L. mutabilis is a low-input crop, disease control is mainly done by phytosanitary methods. Reducing soil-born saprophytes can be reached by removing a dry straw from the field. Instead of green manure, the plant residues can be used as fuel. Seed-borne diseases can be reduced by translocation of seed production and by using certificated seed. If the cultivator does seed production, diseases can be controlled by reducing the number of infected seeds and permanently controlling diseases in the field. Another possibility is to treat the seed with a fungicide before sowing.

=== Breeding goals ===
Since species with low alkaloid content are already available, a further step would be to make them more stable, and low alkaloid content is inherited. Other breeding goals are tolerance to diseases and insects, improvement in yield, early maturing, and synchronous ripening. Higher resistance could be reached by breeding a variety with high alkaloid content in leaves but not in the seeds.

== Uses ==
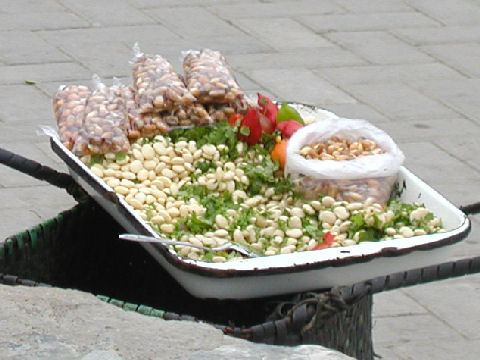
Tray with L. mutabilis seeds

The bone-white seed contains more than 40% protein and 20% fat and has been used as a food by Andean people since ancient times, especially in soups, stews, salads and by itself mixed with boiled maize. Like other legumes, its protein is rich in the essential amino acid lysine. The distribution of essential fatty acids is about 28% linoleic acid (omega-6) and 2% linolenic acid (omega-3). It has a soft seed coat for easy cooking. It may not have been more widely used because of its bitter taste due to the alkaloid content. It contains unusually high amounts of sparteine, which make up nearly half of its alkaloid content. However, the alkaloids are water-soluble and can be removed by soaking the seeds in water for a few days, or via technological methods. QAs are heat-stable toxins; cooking alone does not remove the alkaloids. Like other species of lupin beans, chocho beans are expanding in use as a plant-based protein source in the world marketplace.

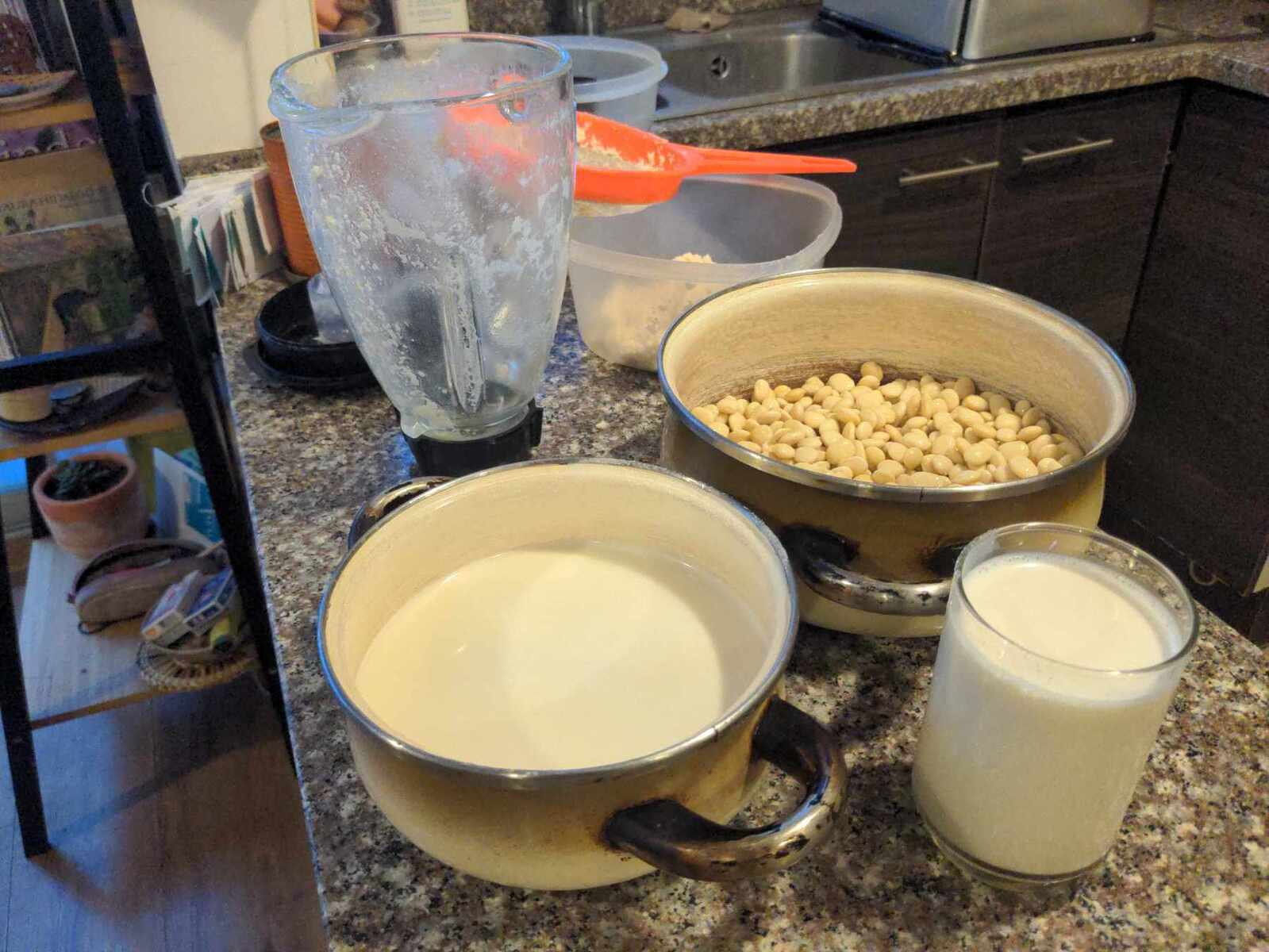
Milk from L. mutabilis seeds

Lupine milk (made from the L. mutabilis seeds) contains 56% more protein than cow's milk. The milk is used to make cheese and yogurt.

=== Chemical composition ===
L. mutabilis contains 42% protein and 18% fat on average. The high fat content allows for commercial oil pressing. The protein digestibility and nutritional value are similar to those in soybeans.

Chemical composition of the tarwi seed
Ingredient	Amount (%)	Range
Protein	42.6	37.7 – 49.7
Oil	18.7	12.8 – 22.2
Fibre	6.27	4.29 – 7.51
Ash	3.69	3.10 – 4.24
Carbohydrates	27.3	23.7 – 29.9
Alkaloids	3.26	2.56 – 4.14

The oil content ranges from 13 to 19% (w/w). Oils extracted with ethanol contain higher levels of antioxidants, phenolic compounds, and polar lipids associated with health benefits.

Fatty acid composition of tarwi seed
Fatty Acid	Petroleum Ether	Hexene	Ethanol
C14:0 (myristic acid)	0.13 ± 0.04	0.12 ± 0.01	0.13 ± 0.03
C16:0 (palmitic acid)	8.43 ± 0.11	8.69 ± 0.68	8.57 ± 0.52
C16:1 (palmitoleic acid)	0.20 ± 0.03	0.21 ± 0.02	0.21 ± 0.01
C18:0 (stearic acid)	5.17 ± 0.11	5.59 ± 0.37	4.75 ± 0.11
C18:1-n9 (oleic acid)	62.49 ± 0.80	55.02 ± 1.31 *	62.03 ± 1.60
C18:2-n6 (linoleic acid)	21.57 ± 0.35	28.15 ± 1.64 *	21.79 ± 1.33
C18:3-n3 (α-linolenic acid)	1.04 ± 0.07	1.11 ± 0.08	1.42± 0.18
C21:0 (henicosanoic acid)	0.96 ± 0.03	0.79 ± 0.17	0.89 ± 0.05
C20:1-n9 (cis-11-eicosenoic acid)	ND	0.10 ± 0.80	0.11 ± 0.01
C23:0 (tricosanoic acid)	ND	0.22 ± 0.70	ND
C22:1-n9 (erucic acid)	ND	ND	0.11 ± 0.01
Total number of fatty acids extracted	8	10	10

ND = not detected. * Values in the same row differ significantly (p < 0.05).

As with all Lupinus spp., L. mutabilis produces compounds called Bandas de Lupinus albus doce (BLADs). Also, as with the rest of the genus, it produces oligomers called BLAD-containing oligomers (BCOs). BCOs have a fungicidal action with multiple MoAs. BCOs were previously classified by the Fungicide Resistance Action Committee into group M 12, but are as of 2021 in group BM 01 (short for "Biological, Multiple modes of action").

Wild populations of L. mutabilis contain toxic, bitter quinolizidine alkaloids. Cultivars also contain QAs but at much lower levels thanks to breeding programs begun in Germany in the 1930s.

=== Green manure and soil improver ===
L. mutabilis can fix nitrogen from the air. Therefore, succeeding cultures can profit from 60 to 140 kg (130 to 310 lb) of nitrogen per hectare. Incorporation in the flowering stage leads to a higher quantity of organic matter and an improved soil structure.
