= Matrine =

Tetracyclic plant alkaloid

Clinical data
- ATC code: none

Legal status
- Legal status: Unscheduled, sold OTC in US

Identifiers
- IUPAC name: (1R,2R,9S,17S)-7,13-Diazatetracyclo[7.7.1.0^{2},^{7}.0^{13},^{17}]heptadecan-6-one
- CAS Number: 519-02-8
- PubChem CID: 91466
- ChemSpider: 82591
- UNII: N390W430AC
- KEGG: C10774
- ChEBI: CHEBI:6700
- ChEMBL: ChEMBL204860
- CompTox Dashboard (EPA): DTXSID00274188
- ECHA InfoCard: 100.117.486

Chemical and physical data
- Formula: C_{15}H_{24}N_{2}O
- Molar mass: 248.370 g·mol^{−1}
- 3D model (JSmol): Interactive image
- SMILES: C1C[C@@H]2[C@H]3CCCN4[C@H]3[C@@H](CCC4)CN2C(=O)C1
- InChI: InChI=1S/C15H24N2O/c18-14-7-1-6-13-12-5-3-9-16-8-2-4-11(15(12)16)10-17(13)14/h11-13,15H,1-10H2/t11-,12+,13+,15-/m0/s1; Key:ZSBXGIUJOOQZMP-JLNYLFASSA-N

Matrine is an alkaloid found in plants from the family Fabaceae. It has a variety of pharmacological effects, including in-vitro anti-cancer effects, as well as κ-opioid and μ-opioid receptor agonism.

Matrine possesses strong antitumor activities in vitro and in vivo. Inhibition of cell proliferation and induction of apoptosis are the likely mechanisms responsible for matrine's antitumor activities. Matrine can be commercially extracted from the traditional Chinese medical herb Sophora flavescens Ait.

Mu opioid agonism is associated with euphoria, while kappa opioid agonism is associated with dysphoria and psychotomimetic hallucinations (as seen in the kappa-agonist Salvinorin A). Both receptors are known to produce analgesia when activated.

Matrine and the related compound oxymatrine have a toxic effect against the formosan subterranean termite. Additionally, it acts as a nematicide against the pine wood nematode which causes pine wilt, as well as pathogenic nematodes which target humans.

Matrine alleviates neuro-inflammation and oxidative stress in the brain caused by acute liver injury, thus producing antianxiety and antidepression effects.

== See also ==
- oxymatrine
