= Lupin bean =

Yellow legume seeds used as food

Lupins, mature seeds, raw
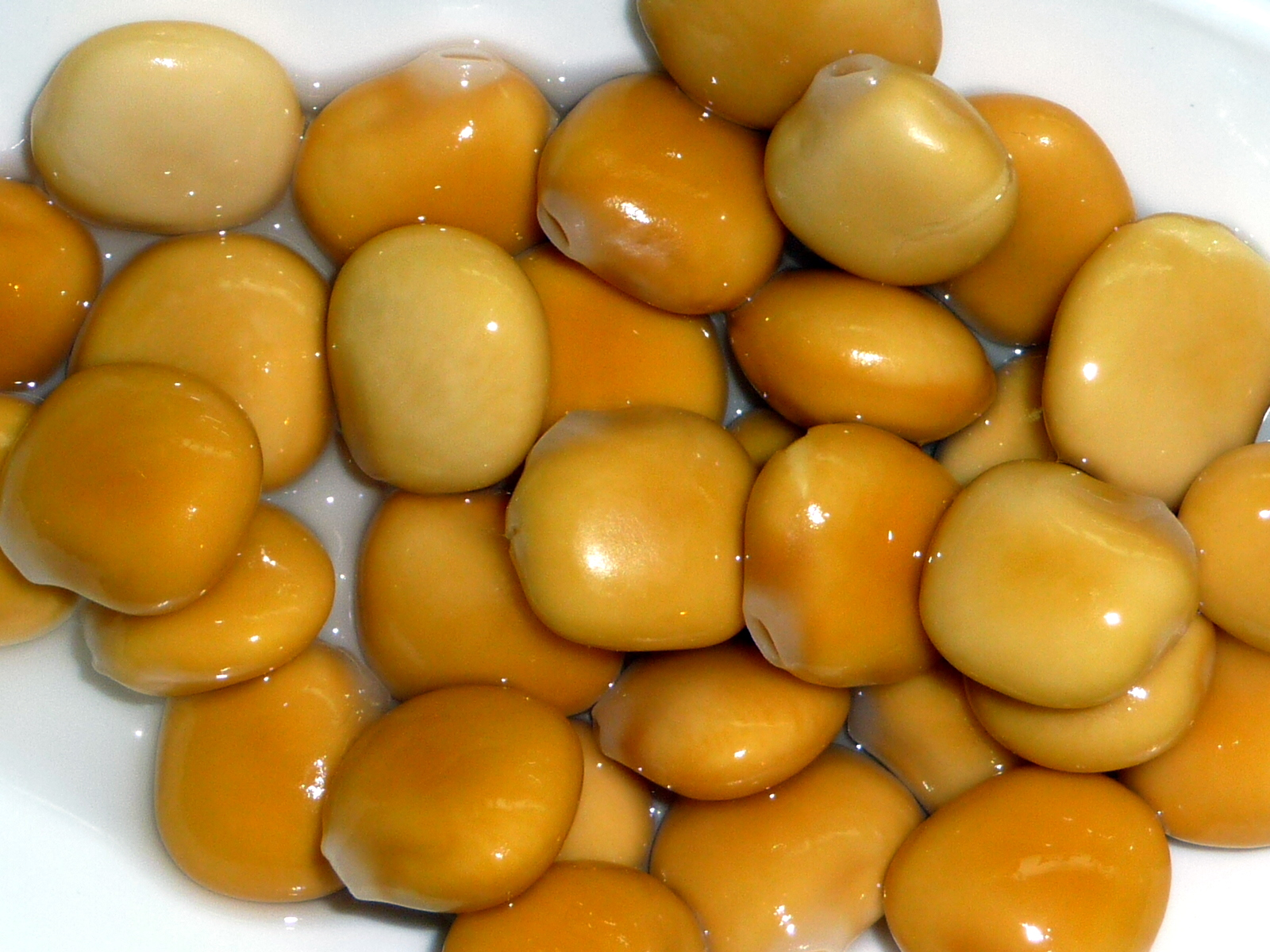
- Pickled lupini beans ready for consumption

Nutritional value per 100 g (3.5 oz)
- Energy: 1,550 kJ (370 kcal)
- Carbohydrates: 40.4g
- Sugars: 0
- Dietary fiber: 18.9 g
- Fat: 9.74 g
- Saturated: 1.16 g
- Trans: 0
- Monounsaturated: 3.94 g
- Polyunsaturated: 2.44 g
- Protein: 36.2 g
Amino acids
Tryptophan	0.289 g
Threonine	1.33 g
Isoleucine	1.62 g
Leucine	2.74 g
Lysine	1.93 g
Methionine	0.255 g
Cystine	0.466 g
Phenylalanine	1.44 g
Tyrosine	1.36 g
Valine	1.51 g
Arginine	3.88 g
Histidine	1.03 g
Alanine	1.3 g
Aspartic acid	3.88 g
Glutamic acid	8.69 g
Glycine	1.54 g
Proline	1.48 g
Serine	1.87 g
Vitamins and minerals
Vitamins	Quantity %DV^{†}
Thiamine (B1)	53% 0.64 mg
Riboflavin (B2)	17% 0.22 mg
Niacin (B3)	14% 2.19 mg
Pantothenic acid (B5)	15% 0.75 mg
Vitamin B6	21% 0.357 mg
Folate (B9)	89% 355 μg
Vitamin C	5% 4.8 mg
Vitamin D	0% 0 μg
Minerals	Quantity %DV^{†}
Calcium	14% 176 mg
Copper	113% 1.02 mg
Iron	24% 4.36 mg
Magnesium	47% 198 mg
Manganese	103% 2.38 mg
Phosphorus	35% 440 mg
Potassium	34% 1010 mg
Selenium	15% 8.2 μg
Sodium	1% 15 mg
Zinc	43% 4.75 mg
- Other constituents: Quantity
- Water: 10.5 g
- Link to entry in USDA FoodData Central database
- ^{†}Percentages estimated using US recommendations for adults, except for potassium, which is estimated based on expert recommendation from the National Academies.

Lupin are the yellow legume seeds of the genus Lupinus. They are traditionally eaten as a pickled snack food, primarily in the Mediterranean basin (L. albus), Latin America (L. mutabilis) and North Africa (L. angustifolius). The most ancient evidence of lupin is from ancient Egypt, dating back to the 22nd century BC. The bitter variety of the beans is high in alkaloids and is extremely bitter unless rinsed methodically. Low-alkaloid cultivars called sweet lupins have been bred, and are increasingly planted.

== History and distribution ==
The earliest archaeological reports on lupins are referred to the Twelfth Dynasty of Egyptian Pharaohs. In their tombs, seeds of Lupinus digitatus Forssk., already domesticated in those times, were discovered. Seven seeds of this species were also retrieved in the tombs of this dynasty dated back to the 22nd century BC. They are the most ancient evidence of lupin in the Mediterranean.

Lupin is commonly used in Egypt (known by the name "termes") and is eaten by the Egyptians as a snack, especially during the Sham Ennessim festival, which is a national festival in Egypt with a history that goes back to ancient Egyptian times. Lupin were also used by the Ancient Greeks and Romans.

The Andean American variety of this lupin, Lupinus mutabilis, was domesticated by pre-Incan inhabitants of present-day Peru. Rock imprints of seeds and leaves, dated around 6th and 7th century BC, are exhibited in the National Museum of Lima. It was a food widespread during the Incan Empire. Lupins were also used by Native Americans in North America, e.g. the Yavapai people.

Today, lupin are commonly found in Mediterranean countries like France, Italy, Spain, Portugal, Greece, in South America and across the Middle East.

== Varieties ==
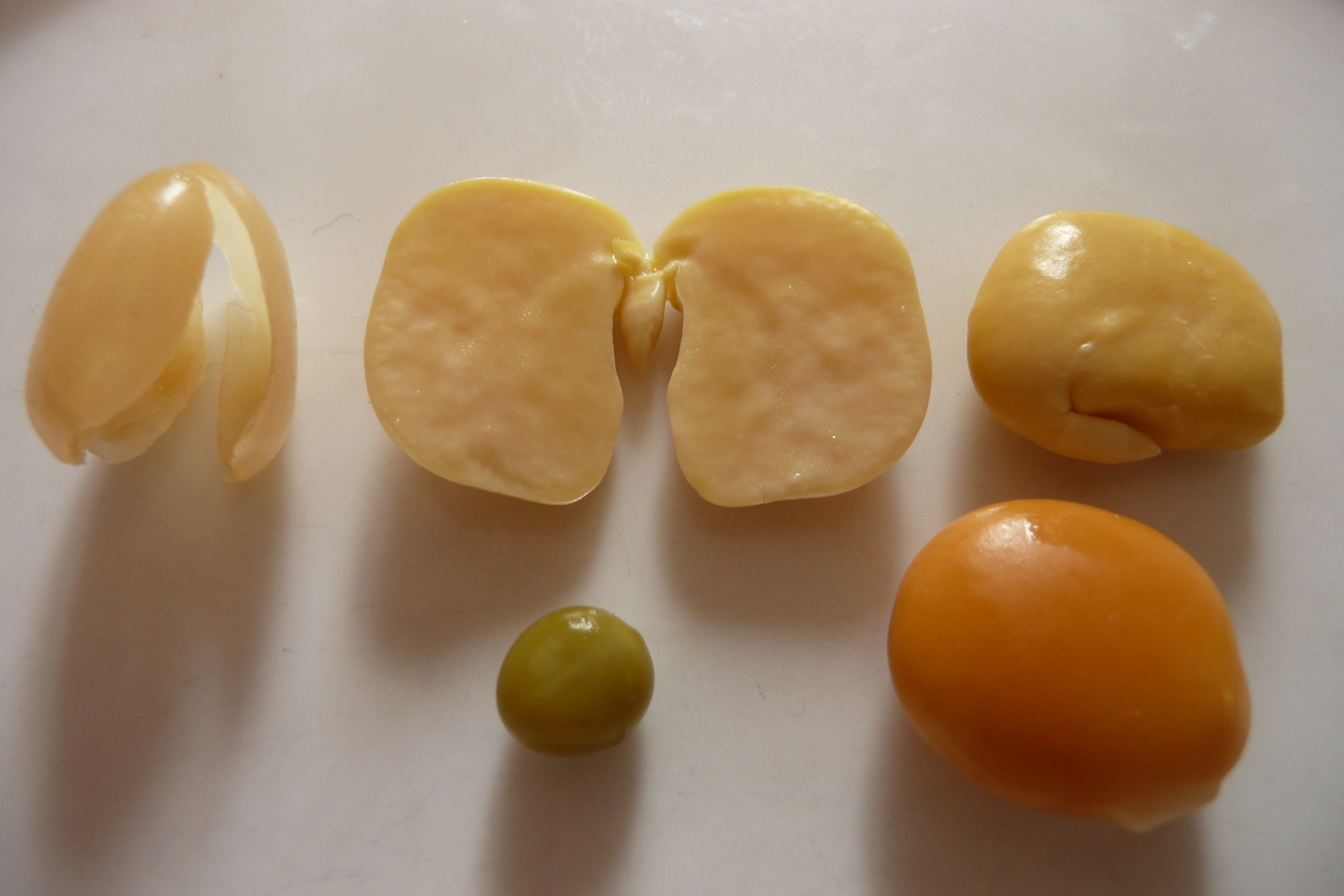
Peeled and unpeeled lupin beans; the skins are often discarded rather than eaten.

Some varieties are referred to as "sweet lupins" because they contain much smaller amounts of toxic alkaloids than the "bitter lupin" varieties. Newly bred variants of the narrow-leafed or 'Australian Sweet Lupin' (L. angustifolius) lupins are grown in Australia, Germany and Poland; they lack any bitter taste and require no soaking in salt solution. The seeds are used for different foods from lupin flake, vegan sausages, lupin-tofu, and lupin flour. Given that lupin seeds have the full range of essential amino acids and that they, contrary to soy, can be grown in more temperate to cool climates, lupins are becoming increasingly recognized as a cash crop alternative to soy.

Three Mediterranean species of lupin (blue lupin, white lupin and yellow lupin) are widely cultivated for livestock and poultry feed. Bitter lupins in feed can cause livestock poisoning.

Lupins are currently under widespread cultivation in Australia, Europe, Russia, and the Americas as a green manure, livestock fodder and grazing plant, and high-protein additive for animal and human foods. In Australia, the danger of cross-pollination of the wild bitter and cultivated sweet low-alkaloid variety is understood to be unacceptable when testing reveals the presence of one bitter bean per hundred sweet beans, and a wide quarantine zone is maintained around lupin-growing croplands to prevent wind-blown wild pollen from having a large influence on crop toxicity.

== Uses ==
Lupin beans are commonly sold in a brine in jars (like olives and pickles). They can be eaten by making a small tear in the skin with one's teeth and "popping" the seed directly into one's mouth, but can also be eaten with the skin on. The skin can also be removed by rubbing the bean between forefinger and thumb.

In France they are found mainly in the southern part of the country. They are prepared in brine, like olives and are often served with an aperitif or used to garnish salads.

In Egypt, lupin is known by its Egyptian Arabic name "termis" (ترمس), and it is sold by street vendors as well as local markets as a snack, especially during the Sham el-Nessim festival.

The Andean lupin L. mutabilis, the Mediterranean Lupinus albus (white lupin), and Lupinus hirsutus are only edible after soaking the seeds for some days in salted water. In Ecuador, the lupin is often consumed as a ceviche-like street food known as "cevichochos".

Lupin beans can be ground into a naturally gluten free flour. This is used in gluten free baking, pasta, and sauces. It is also widely used in parts of Europe and in Australia as an additive to wheat flour, enhancing the flavour and lending a rich, creamy colour to the resulting foods.

They can also be used as a key ingredient in vegan dairy, egg, and meat substitutes. As of 2020, only 4% of lupins were consumed by humans, with the majority used as stock feed. Lupin beans are growing in use as a plant-based protein source in the world marketplace.

== Nutrition ==
Raw lupin beans are 10% water, 40% carbohydrates, 36% protein, and 10% fat (table). In a 100-gram (3 1/2-ounce) reference amount, raw lupins supply 1,550 kilojoules (370 kilocalories) of food energy and are moderate-rich sources of B vitamins, especially folate at 89% of the Daily Value (DV) (table). Lupins also contain substantial amounts of dietary minerals, including manganese at 113% DV (table).

Lupins have a thick seed coat (25%) which consists mainly of cellulose (insoluble bran fiber) and is removed as the first step in processing.

== Toxicity ==
Lupin poisoning is a nervous syndrome caused by alkaloids in bitter lupins. Lupin poisoning affects people who eat incorrectly prepared lupin beans. Mediterranean cultures prefer the historic bitter lupin beans with the required toxin-removal by traditional leaching in water preparation methods due to the better flavour that results. Improper preparation of bitter lupins with insufficient soaking allows pharmacologically significant amounts of the anticholinergic alkaloids to remain in the beans, and poisoning symptoms result.

While the alkaloids found in raw and dried beans are bitter and unpalatable to many, with soaking the level is reduced. There are several references in medical literature to poisoning caused by errors in lupini preparation.

Symptoms of lupin bean poisoning (from excess alkaloid in cooked food) include dilated unresponsive pupils, confusion, slowed thought and disorientation, flushed face and/or fever, high heart rate and blood pressure, tremors, difficulty with or slurred speech, in-coordination, dizziness, burning dry mouth, stomach pain, and anxiety or "malaise".

Many human symptoms are described in the Australian government's evaluation of lupin food and livestock fodder export safety standards in the medical literature review section

Current media describes the symptoms when referring to recent Australian Medical Journal reports of poisoning from overly bitter lupin flour used in foods reported in the media.

According to the Australia New Zealand Food Authority (2001), "data indicates that the mean alkaloid content of marketable sweet lupin seed is on average 130–150 mg/kg." Regarding the daily tolerable intake of alkaloids, it writes, "The only data available on human chronic toxicity are the reports of traditional use of lupini beans in Europe, which indicate a daily dose of 0.35 mg/kg can be tolerated in adults without adverse affects. […] Also, the information applies only to adults, not children, and it is likely that the adult population has developed a certain amount of tolerance to these alkaloids. […] If a safety factor of 10 is applied to account for the uncertainties in the data and particularly to take into account likely human variation, the provisional tolerable daily intake (PTDI) for humans is 0.035 mg/kg/day or 35 μg/kg/day."

A 2017 opinion by the German Federal Institute for Risk Assessment states that "there are no systematic and validated tests for the quality of household kitchen debittering methods", and as a precaution, it recommends that "consumers avoid the consumption of bitter lupin seeds which were not debittered by the manufacturer, as there is no certainty that the recommended debittering procedures result in a sufficient reduction in the levels of health-damaging alkaloids."

Mycotoxic lupinosis is a disease caused by lupin material that is infected with the fungus Diaporthe toxica; the fungus produces mycotoxins called phomopsins, which cause liver damage.

== Lupin allergy ==
Lupin allergy may cause life-threatening anaphylaxis in sensitive individuals. There is some cross-reactivity with peanut allergy, so nut allergy sufferers should exercise extreme caution with lupin-containing food. In the EU, lupin must be listed as an allergen in pre-packed foods where it has been used, but may still be hidden in over-the-counter products. This can be a significant problem for allergy sufferers since breads, pastries, pizzas, pasta, cakes and ice cream are all commonly sold over-the-counter, and all may contain lupin. Lupin has even been found in some tomato ketchup sauces. At present, no desensitization treatments are available, so avoidance is the only advice offered, alongside carrying an epi-pen and anti-histamine/anti-inflammatory medication.

== See also ==
- Lupinus luteus and Lupinus for species and genus information, and for other uses of the lupin bean.
