= Sparteine =

Chemical compound

Clinical data
- Other names: (6R,8S,10R,12S)-7,15-diazatetracyclo[7.7.1.0^{2,7}.0^{10,15}]heptadecane
- AHFS/Drugs.com: International Drug Names
- ATC code: C01BA04 (WHO)

Identifiers
- IUPAC name: (7α,9α)-sparteine
- CAS Number: 90-39-1
- PubChem CID: 644020
- DrugBank: DB06727
- ChemSpider: 559096
- UNII: 298897D62S
- KEGG: D01041
- ChEBI: CHEBI:28827
- ChEMBL: ChEMBL44625
- CompTox Dashboard (EPA): DTXSID4023591
- ECHA InfoCard: 100.001.808

Chemical and physical data
- Formula: C_{15}H_{26}N_{2}
- Molar mass: 234.387 g·mol^{−1}
- 3D model (JSmol): Interactive image
- Density: 1.02 g/cm^{3}
- Melting point: 30 °C (86 °F)
- Boiling point: 325 °C (617 °F)
- Solubility in water: 3.04 mg/mL (20 °C)
- SMILES: C1CCN2C[C@@H]3C[C@H]([C@H]2C1)CN4[C@H]3CCCC4
- InChI: InChI=1S/C15H26N2/c1-3-7-16-11-13-9-12(14(16)5-1)10-17-8-4-2-6-15(13)17/h12-15H,1-11H2/t12-,13-,14-,15+/m0/s1; Key:SLRCCWJSBJZJBV-ZQDZILKHSA-N

Sparteine is a class 1a antiarrhythmic agent and sodium channel blocker. It is an alkaloid and can be extracted from scotch broom. It is the predominant alkaloid in Lupinus mutabilis, and is thought to chelate the bivalent metals calcium and magnesium. It is not FDA approved for human use as an antiarrhythmic agent, and it is not included in the Vaughan Williams classification of antiarrhythmic drugs.

It is also used as a chiral ligand in organic chemistry, especially in syntheses involving organolithium reagents.

== Biosynthesis ==
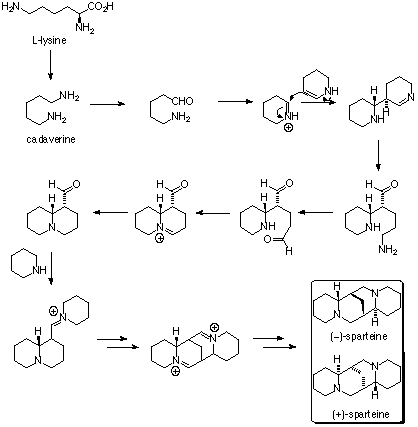
Originally proposed biosynthesis pathway of sparteine

Sparteine is a lupin alkaloid containing a tetracyclic bis-quinolizidine ring system derived from three C_{5} chains of lysine, or more specifically, L-lysine. The first intermediate in the biosynthesis is cadaverine, the decarboxylation product of lysine catalyzed by the enzyme lysine decarboxylase (LDC). Three units of cadaverine are used to form the quinolizidine skeleton. The mechanism of formation has been studied enzymatically, as well as with tracer experiments, but the exact route of synthesis still remains unclear.

Tracer studies using ^{13}C-^{15}N-doubly labeled cadaverine have shown three units of cadaverine are incorporated into sparteine and two of the C-N bonds from two of the cadaverine units remain intact. The observations have also been confirmed using ^{2}H NMR labeling experiments.

Enzymatic evidence then showed that the three molecules of cadaverine are transformed to the quinolizidine ring via enzyme bound intermediates, without the generation of any free intermediates. Originally, it was thought that conversion of cadaverine to the corresponding aldehyde, 5-aminopentanal, was catalyzed by the enzyme diamine oxidase. The aldehyde then spontaneously converts to the corresponding Schiff base, Δ^{1}-piperideine. Coupling of two molecules occurs between the two tautomers of Δ^{1}-piperideine in an aldol-type reaction. The imine is then hydrolyzed to the corresponding aldehyde/amine. The primary amine is then oxidized to an aldehyde followed by formation of the imine to yield the quinolizidine ring.

=== Via 17-oxosparteine synthase ===
More recent enzymatic evidence has indicated the presence of 17-oxosparteine synthase (OS), a transaminase enzyme. The deaminated cadaverine is not released from the enzyme, thus is can be assumed that the enzyme catalyzes the formation of the quinolizidine skeleton in a channeled fashion . 7-oxosparteine requires four units of pyruvate as the NH_{2} acceptors and produces four molecules of alanine. Both lysine decarboxylase and the quinolizidine skeleton-forming enzyme are localized in chloroplasts.

Biosynthesis of sparteine by 17-oxosparteine synthase

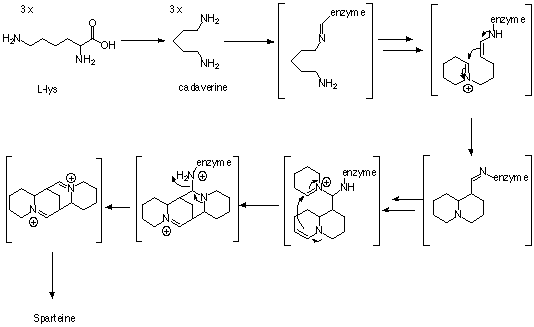
Proposed ring cyclization steps

Overall schematic

== See also ==
- Lupinus
- Lupin poisoning
