= Quinolizidine =

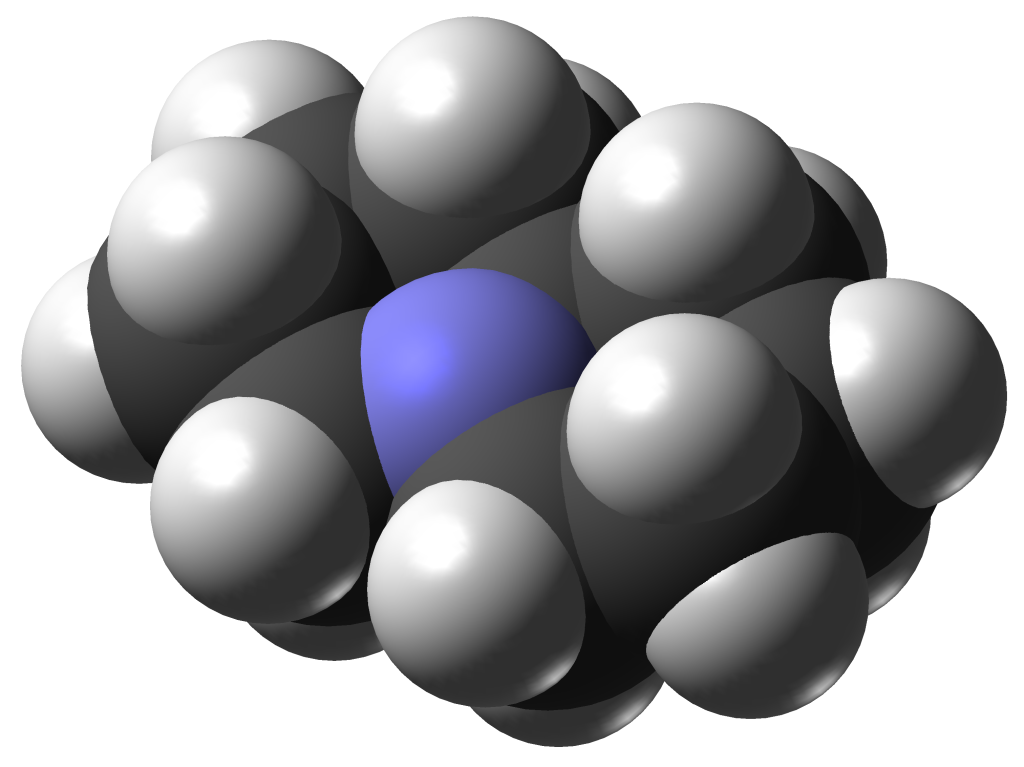

Names
- Preferred IUPAC name Octahydro-2H-quinolizine
- Other names Norlupinane, quinolizidine

Identifiers
CAS Number	493-10-7
3D model (JSmol)	Interactive image
ChEBI	CHEBI:46751
ChemSpider	106363
PubChem CID	119036
UNII	S6O58HOW33
CompTox Dashboard (EPA)	DTXSID90964203
- InChI: InChI=1/C9H17N/c1-3-7-10-8-4-2-6-9(10)5-1/h9H,1-8H
- SMILES: C1CCN2CCCCC2C1

Properties
Chemical formula	C_{9}H_{17}N
Molar mass	139.24
- Except where otherwise noted, data are given for materials in their standard state (at 25 °C [77 °F], 100 kPa). Infobox references

Quinolizidine (norlupinane, octahydro-2H-quinolizine) is a nitrogen-containing heterocyclic compound. Some alkaloids (e.g. cytisine and sparteine) are derivatives of quinolizidine.

== Quinolizidine alkaloids ==
Quinolizidine alkaloids, such as nupharine and related chemicals, can be found in Nymphaea lotus and other species in the family Nymphaeaceae. Quinolizidine alkaloids are also found in genistoid legumes.
