= List of trees native to New Zealand =

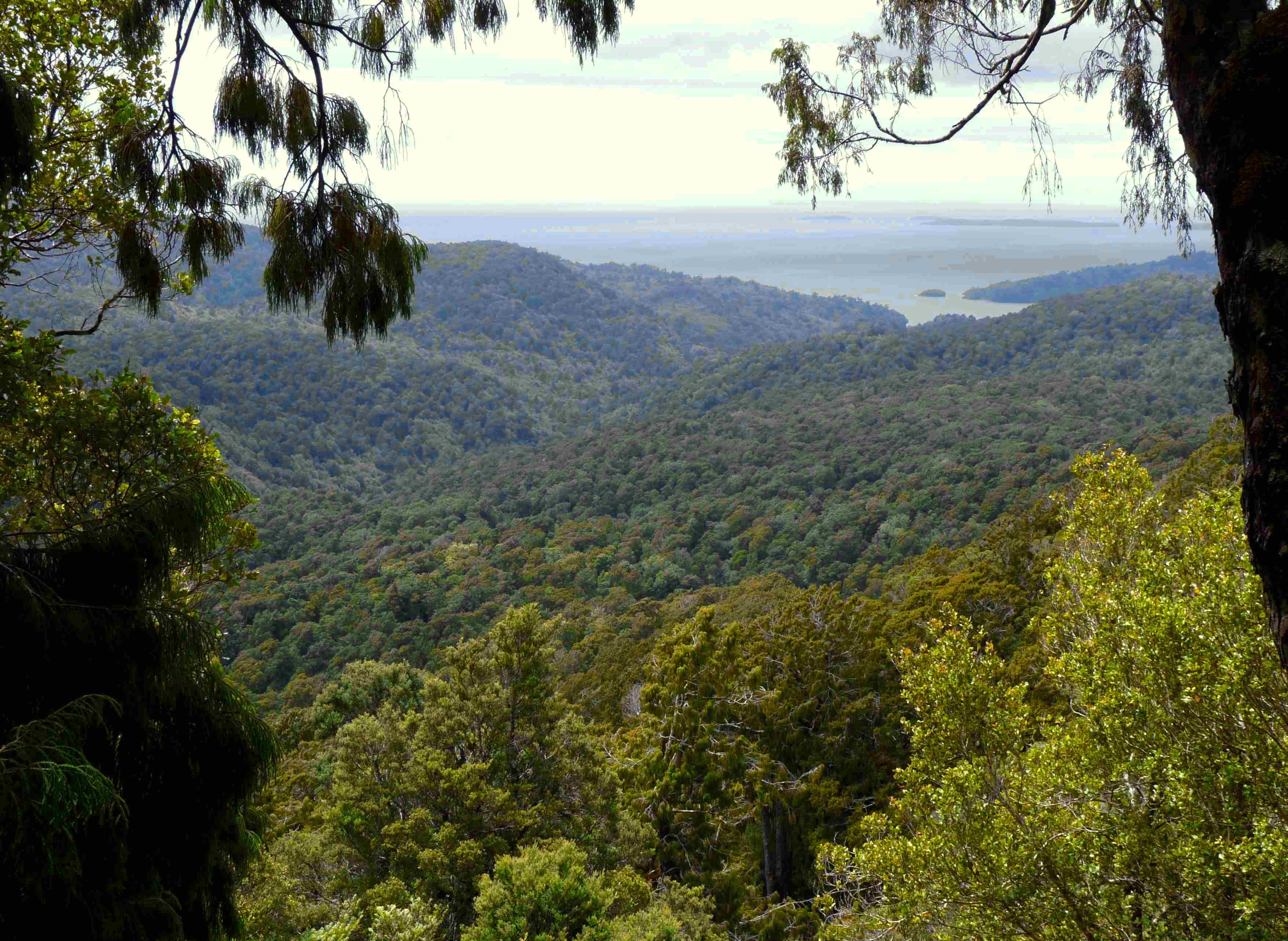
Native forest on Stewart Island / Rakiura

New Zealand's long geological isolation means that most of its flora is unique, with many durable hard woods. There is a wide variety of native trees, adapted to all the various micro-climates in New Zealand. The native bush (forest) ranges from the subtropical kauri forests of the northern North Island, temperate rainforests of the West Coast, the alpine forests of the Southern Alps and Fiordland to the coastal forests of the Abel Tasman National Park and the Catlins.

In the early period of British colonisation, many New Zealand trees were known by names derived from the names of unrelated European trees, but more recently the trend has been to adopt the native Māori language names into English. For a listing in order of Māori name, with species names for most, see the Flora of New Zealand list of vernacular names.

The New Zealand Plant Conservation Network has published a list of New Zealand indigenous vascular plants including all 574 native trees and shrubs. This list also identifies which trees are endemic to New Zealand and which are threatened with extinction.

== Species ==
=== Pteridophyta (ferns) ===
- Cyatheaceae (a tree fern family)
  - Gully tree fern Alsophila cunninghamii
  - Mamaku Sphaeropteris medullaris
  - Mountain tree fern Alsophila colensoi
  - Silver fern or ponga, Alsophila tricolor
  - Soft tree fern Alsophila smithii
- Dicksoniaceae (a tree fern family)
  - Kuripaka or whekī-ponga Dicksonia fibrosa
  - New Zealand tree fern or whekī, Dicksonia squarrosa
  - Tūākura Dicksonia lanata

=== Pinophyta (conifers) ===
- Araucariaceae (kauri family)
  - Kauri Agathis australis
- Cupressaceae (cypress family)
  - Kawaka Libocedrus plumosa
  - Pāhautea Libocedrus bidwillii
- Podocarpaceae (yellow-wood family)
  - Hall's tōtara Podocarpus laetus
  - Kahikatea Dacrycarpus dacrydioides (formerly Podocarpus)
  - Manoao Manoao colensoi
  - Mataī Prumnopitys taxifolia
  - Miro Pectinopitys ferruginea
  - Monoao Halocarpus kirkii
  - Mountain pine Halocarpus bidwillii
  - Mountain toatoa Phyllocladus alpinus
  - Mountain tōtara Podocarpus nivalis
  - Needle-leaved tōtara Podocarpus acutifolius
  - Pygmy pine Lepidothamnus laxifolius
  - Rimu Dacrydium cupressinum
  - Tānekaha Phyllocladus trichomanoides
  - Toatoa Phyllocladus toatoa (formerly Phyllocladus glaucus)
  - Tōtara Podocarpus totara
  - Yellow pine Halocarpus biformis
  - Yellow silver pine Lepidothamnus intermedius

=== Angiosperms (flowering plants) ===
- Akeake Dodonaea viscosa
- Beilschmiedia
  - Taraire Beilschmiedia tarairi
  - Tawa Beilschmiedia tawa
  - Tawaroa Beilschmiedia tawaroa
- Coprosmas
  - Chatham Islands karamū Coprosma chathamica (Chatham Islands)
  - Coprosma acutifolia (Kermadec Islands)
  - Coprosma ciliata
  - Coprosma dumosa
  - Coprosma foetidissima (common name Stinkwood)
  - Coprosma macrocarpa subsp. minor
  - Coprosma pedicellata
  - Kanono Coprosma autumnalis
  - Karamū Coprosma lucida
  - Large-seeded coprosma Coprosma macrocarpa subsp. macrocarpa
  - Leafy coprosma Coprosma parviflora
  - Māmāngi Coprosma arborea
  - Mikimiki Coprosma linariifolia
  - Taupata Coprosma petiolata (Kermadec Islands)
  - Taupata Coprosma repens
- Cabbage trees Cordyline
  - Cabbage tree Cordyline australis
  - Dwarf cabbage tree Cordyline pumilio
  - Forest cabbage tree Cordyline banksii
  - Mountain cabbage tree Cordyline indivisa
  - Three Kings cabbage tree Cordyline obtecta
- Dracophyllum (dragon leaf)
  - Chatham Island grass tree Dracophyllum arboreum (Chatham Islands)
  - Dracophyllum acerosum
  - Dracophyllum fiordense
  - Dracophyllum townsonii
  - Gumland grass tree Dracophyllum lessonianum
  - Inaka / Inanga Dracophyllum longifolium
  - Inanga Dracophyllum filifolium
  - Mountain neinei Dracophyllum traversii
  - Neinei Dracophyllum latifolium
  - Slender dragon tree Dracophyllum elegantissimum
  - Tōtorowhiti Dracophyllum strictum
  - Variable inaka Dracophyllum trimorphum
- Elaeocarpus
  - Hīnau Elaeocarpus dentatus
  - Pōkākā Elaeocarpus hookerianus
- Five finger Neopanax arboreus
- Griselinia
  - Akapuka Griselinia lucida
  - Kāpuka Griselinia littoralis
- Horopito
  - Lowland horopito Pseudowintera axillaris
  - Mountain horopito Pseudowintera colorata
  - Northland horopito Pseudowintera insperata
  - Travers horopito Pseudowintera traversii
- Kaikōmako Pennantia corymbosa
- Kākā beak Clianthus puniceus
- Kawakawa Piper excelsum
- Kānuka
  - Geothermal kānuka Kunzea ericoides var. microflora
  - Great Barrier Island kānuka Kunzea sinclairii
  - Kānuka Kunzea ericoides var. ericoides
- Karaka Corynocarpus laevigatus
- Kohekohe Didymocheton spectabilis
- Koromiko Veronica salicifolia
- Kōtukutuku Fuchsia excorticata
- Kōwhai
  - Coastal kōwhai Sophora chathamica
  - Godley's kōwhai Sophora godleyi
  - Large-leaved kōwhai Sophora tetraptera
  - Limestone kōwhai Sophora longicarinata
  - Small-leaved kōwhai Sophora microphylla
  - Sophora fulvida
- Lacebarks
  - Lacebark Hoheria populnea
  - Long-leaved lacebark Hoheria sexstylosa
  - Mountain lacebark Hoheria glabrata
  - Mountain lacebark Hoheria lyallii
  - Narrow-leaved houhere Hoheria angustifolia
  - Poor Knights houhere Hoheria equitum
- Māhoe
  - Māhoe Melicytus ramiflorus
  - Narrow-leaved māhoe Melicytus lanceolatus
- Maire Notelaea
  - Black maire Notelaea cunninghamii
  - Coastal maire Notelaea apetala
  - Narrow-leaved maire Notelaea montana
  - White maire Notelaea neolanceolata
- Makomako Aristotelia serrata
- Mangrove or Mānawa Avicennia marina
- Mānuka Leptospermum scoparium
- Matagouri Discaria toumatou
- Matipo
  - Black matipo, see Pittosporum tenuifolium
  - Coastal matipo Myrsine aquilonia
  - Chatham Island matipo Myrsine chathamica
  - Mt Burnett matipo Myrsine argentea
  - Red matipo Myrsine australis
  - Swamp matipo Myrsine coxii
- Metrosideros
  - Bartlett's rātā Metrosideros bartlettii
  - Kermadec pōhutukawa Metrosideros kermadecensis
  - Northern rātā Metrosideros robusta
  - Parkinson's rātā Metrosideros parkinsonii
  - Pōhutukawa Metrosideros excelsa
  - Southern rātā Metrosideros umbellata
- Milk tree Paratrophis
  - Large-leaved milk tree Paratrophis banksii
  - Small-leaved milk tree Paratrophis microphylla
  - Three Kings milk tree Paratrophis smithii
- Nīkau Rhopalostylis sapida
- Ngaio Myoporum laetum
- Ongaonga Urtica ferox
- Pigeonwood Hedycarya arborea
- Pittosporum
  - Black matipo Pittosporum tenuifolium
  - Fairchild's kōhūhū Pittosporum fairchildii
  - Haekaro Pittosporum umbellatum
  - Heart-leaved pittosporum Pittosporum obcordatum
  - Hutton's kōhūhū Pittosporum huttonianum
  - Karo Pittosporum crassifolium
  - Karo Pittosporum ralphii
  - Lemonwood Pittosporum eugenioides
  - Pitpat Pittosporum patulum
  - Pittosporum ellipticum
  - Pittosporum virgatum
  - Turner's kōhūhū Pittosporum turneri
- Pōteriteri Leptecophylla robusta
- Pseudopanax
  - Lancewood Pseudopanax crassifolius
  - Toothed lancewood Pseudopanax ferox
- Pterophylla
  - Kāmahi Pterophylla racemosa
  - Tōwai Pterophylla sylvicola
- Puka Meryta sinclairii
- Pukatea Laurelia novae-zelandiae
- Putaputawētā Carpodetus serratus
- Pūriri Vitex lucens
- Quintinia
  - Tāwheowheo Quintinia serrata
- Ramarama Lophomyrtus bullata
- Rautini Brachyglottis huntii
- Rewarewa Knightia excelsa
- Ribbonwood
  - Ribbonwood Plagianthus regius
  - Chatham Island ribbonwood Plagianthus regius subsp. chathamicus
  - Lowland ribbonwood or mānatu Plagianthus regius subsp. regius
- Shawia
  - Akepiro Shawia furfuracea
  - Akiraho Shawia paniculata
  - Coastal tree daisy Shawia solandri
  - Common tree daisy Shawia arborescens
- Southern beeches Nothofagus
  - Black beech Nothofagus solandri
  - Hard beech Nothofagus truncata
  - Mountain beech Nothofagus cliffortioides
  - Red beech Nothofagus fusca
  - Silver beech Nothofagus menziesii
- Swamp maire Syzygium maire
- Tāwari Ixerba brexioides
- Tawāpou Planchonella costata
- Tītoki Alectryon excelsus
- Toro Myrsine salicina
- Tree daisy Olearia
  - Chatham Island akeake Olearia traversiorum
  - Fragrant tree daisy Olearia fragrantissima
  - Gardner's tree daisy Olearia gardneri
  - Great Barrier tree daisy Olearia allomii
  - Hector's tree daisy Olearia hectorii
  - Heketara Olearia rani var. colorata
  - Heketara Olearia rani var. rani
  - Kereterehe Olearia chathamica
  - Lancewood tree daisy Olearia lacunosa
  - Mountain akeake Olearia avicenniifolia
  - Mountain holly Olearia ilicifolia
  - Musky tree daisy Olearia moschata
  - Olearia angulata
  - Olearia crebra
  - Olearia lineata
  - Small-leaved tree daisy Olearia fimbriata
  - Streamside tree daisy Olearia cheesemanii
  - Subantarctic tree daisy Olearia lyallii
  - Swamp akeake Olearia telmatica
  - Tanguru Olearia albida
  - Tētēaweka Olearia angustifolia
- Wharangi Melicope ternata
- Whau Entelea arborescens (corkwood)

== See also ==
- List of extinct plants of New Zealand
