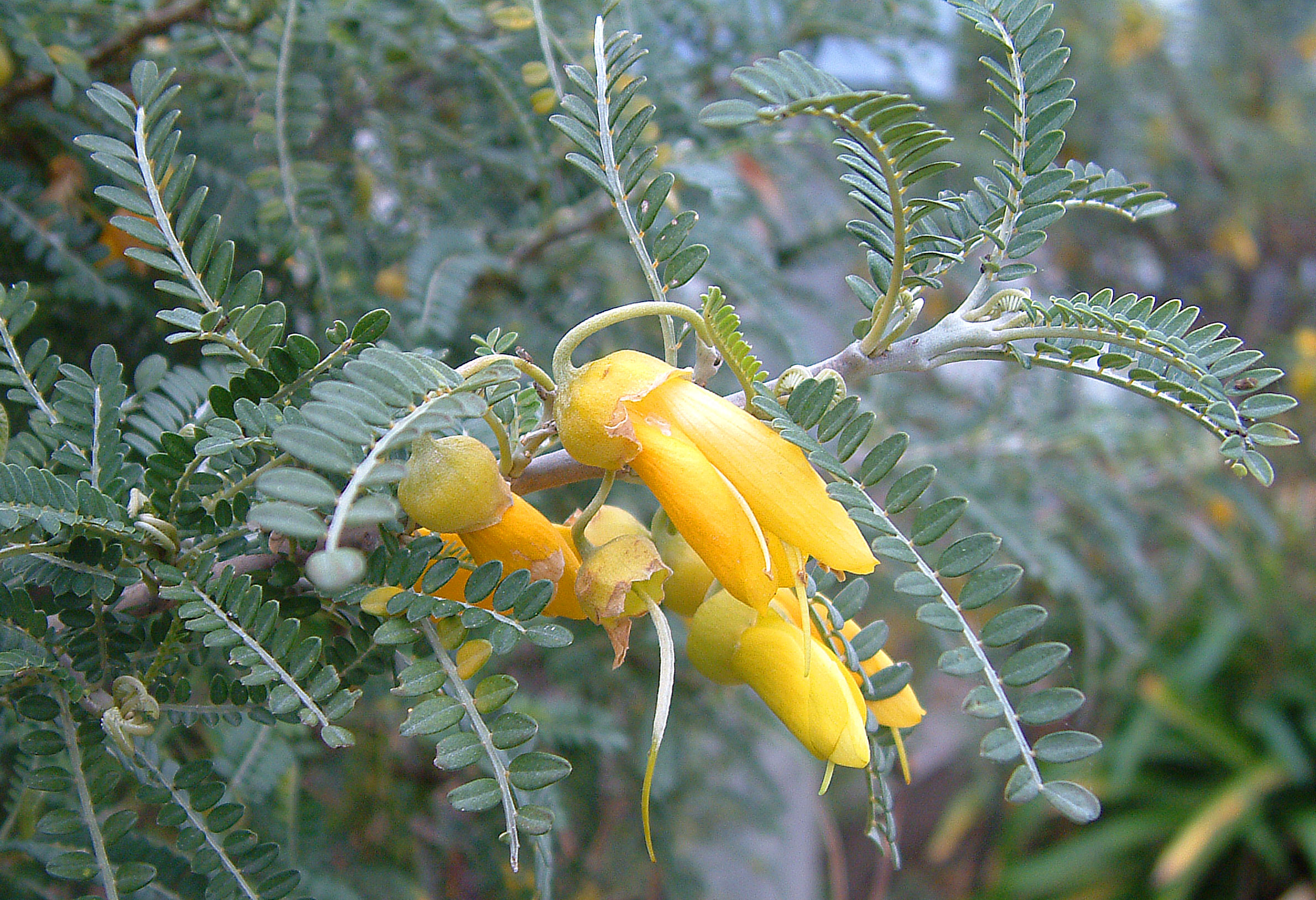
- 'Dragon's Gold' cultivar

Conservation status
- Naturally Uncommon (NZ TCS)

Scientific classification
- Kingdom: Plantae
- Clade: Tracheophytes
- Clade: Angiosperms
- Clade: Eudicots
- Clade: Rosids
- Order: Fabales
- Family: Fabaceae
- Subfamily: Faboideae
- Genus: Sophora
- Species: S. molloyi

Binomial name
- Sophora molloyi Heenan & de Lange

= Sophora molloyi =

Species of plant endemic to New Zealand

Sophora molloyi, the Cook Strait kōwhai, Molloy's kōwhai or Stephen's Island kōwhai, one of 8 species of kōwhai native to New Zealand, grows naturally around the Cook Strait region. It was first described as a species in 2001 and named after Brian Molloy of Landcare Research, who was a researcher and scientist for more than 30 years.

== Description ==
Cook Strait kōwhai forms a small compact bush and can become quite wide but only grows to about head height. It is an early flowering species, normally between April and October. Flowers are yellow and around 3 cm long. Unlike other kōwhai, S. molloyi retains its leaves all year round, and does not have a divaricating juvenile stage when grown from seed.

== Conservation ==
Using the New Zealand Threat Classification System, S. molloyi was rated in 2012 as being "At Risk – Naturally Uncommon". Cook Strait kōwhai was previously rated in 2004 as being at risk due to its restricted range. This classification remains as of 2017.

== Cultivation ==
In horticulture it is sold as the two varieties 'Dragons Gold' and 'Early Gold', which are popular garden plants.

- The cultivar 'Dragons Gold' (or 'Dragon's Gold') was selected by Terry Hatch of Joy Plants and came from material sourced from Stephens Island in the 1950s. The original plant the cultivar was grown from eventually grew to 6 metres in height, although 2 m is more usual within the first 10 years. It is an excellent plant for covering difficult banks and places with poor soil and has clusters of bright yellow flowers. The naming of this cultivar commemorates Stephens Island's numerous tuatara, likening it to an 'isle of dragons'.
- The cultivar 'Early Gold' is an earlier selection made by the late John Goldie, and was also sourced from seedlings raised from Stephens Island. It is similar to 'Dragons Gold' but has paler, lemony yellow-coloured flowers. This cultivar was under Plant Variety Rights for some time, but these have now expired.

Sophora molloyi makes a good container plant due to its smaller size, because it retains its leaves year-round and flowers over winter when few other plants are flowering.
