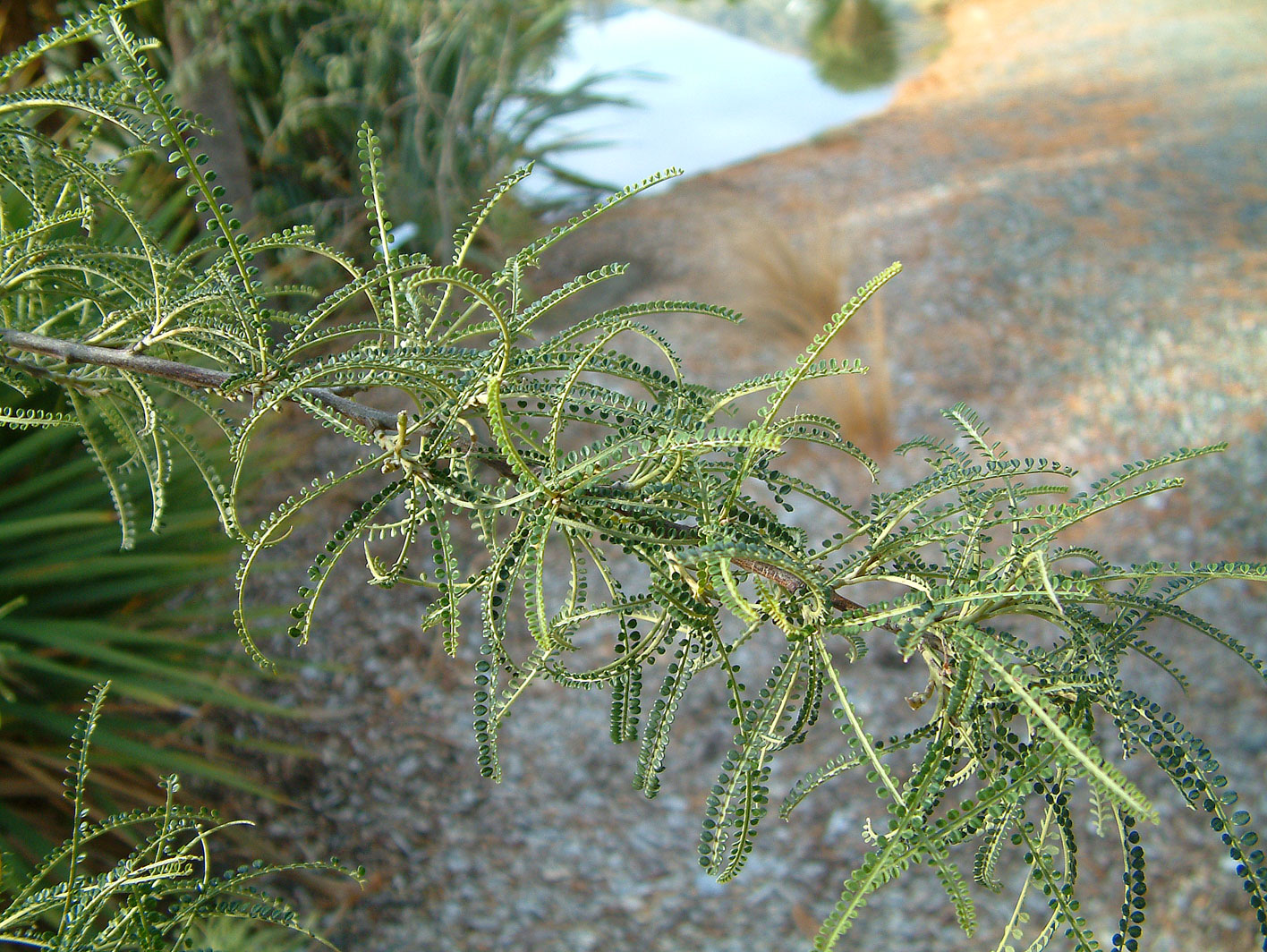
- Limestone kōwhai foliage

Scientific classification
- Kingdom: Plantae
- Clade: Tracheophytes
- Clade: Angiosperms
- Clade: Eudicots
- Clade: Rosids
- Order: Fabales
- Family: Fabaceae
- Subfamily: Faboideae
- Genus: Sophora
- Species: S. longicarinata

Binomial name
- Sophora longicarinata G.Simpson & J.S.Thomson

= Sophora longicarinata =

Species of plant

Sophora longicarinata is commonly known as kōwhai or limestone kōwhai that grows naturally in a limited range around northern Nelson and also western Marlborough in New Zealand. This species has quite small leaves compared to other similar species. Originally classified as a species in 1942 and then merged with Sophora microphylla it was reclassified as its own species again in 2001. As its common name suggests it grows in limestone areas. This species does not have a divaricating juvenile phase.

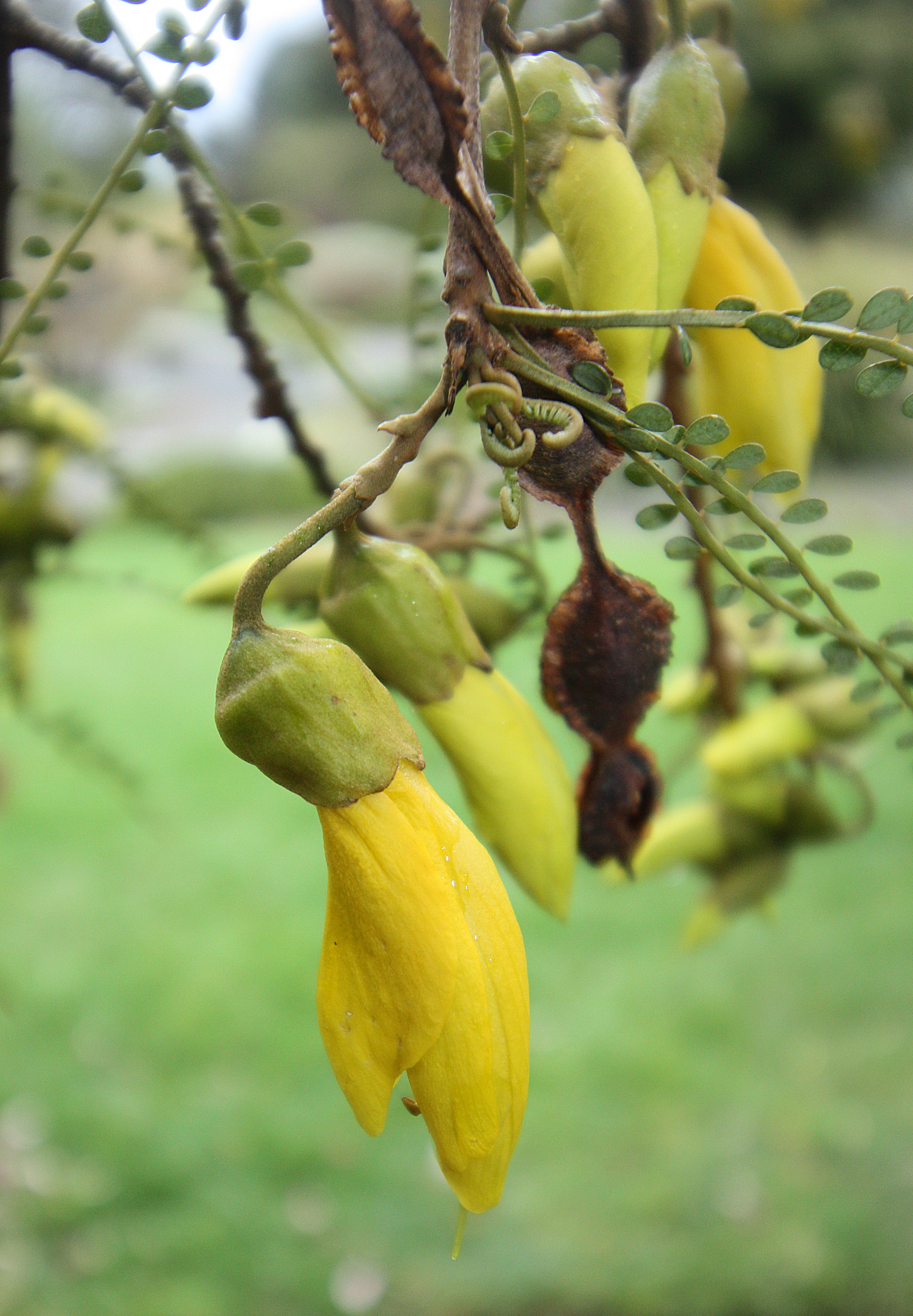
Limestone kōwhai flower and seed pod closeup
