= Kōwhai =

Plant species in the genus Sophora native to New Zealand

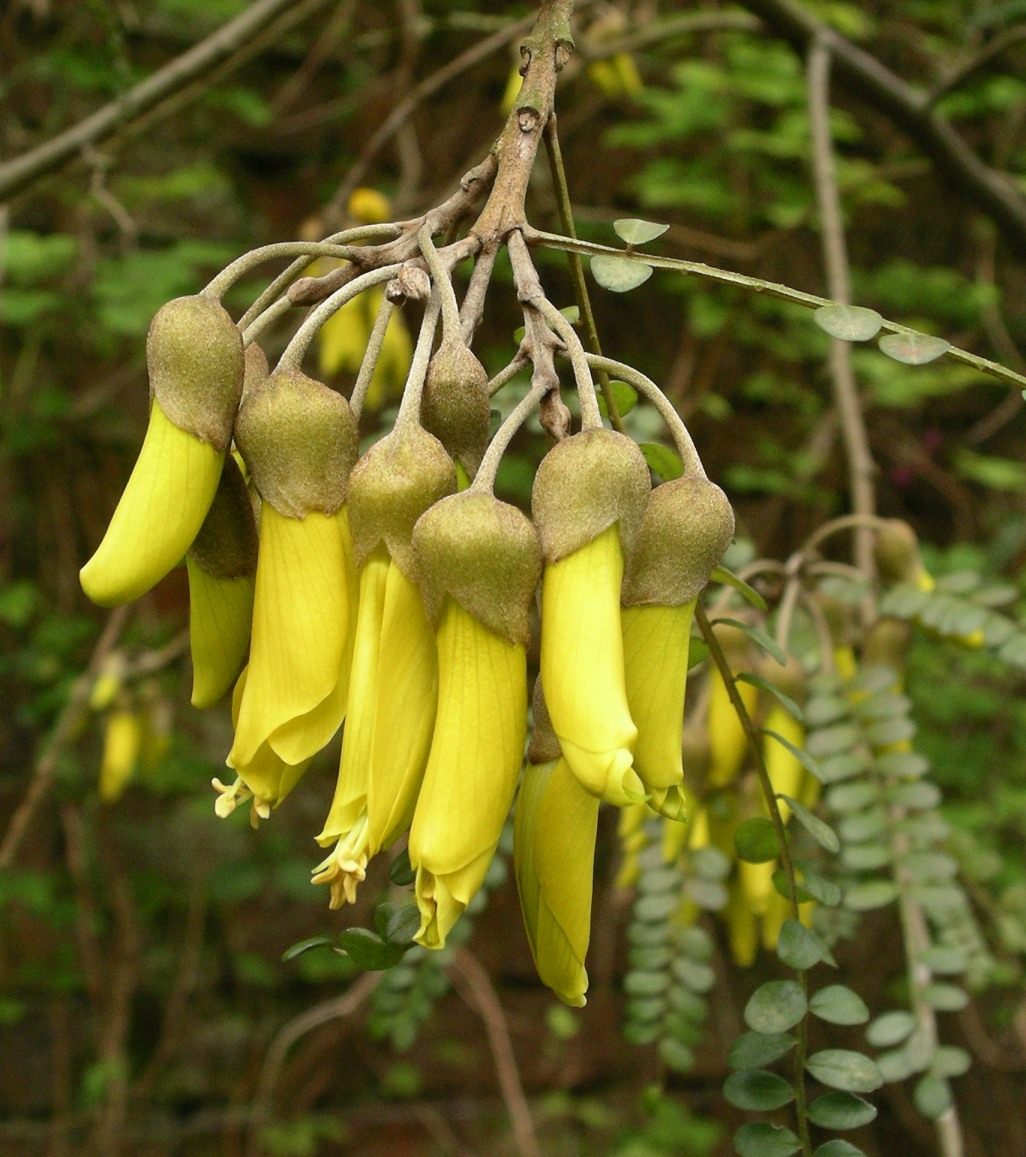
Kōwhai flowers

Kōwhai (Māori pronunciation: [kɔːɸai] or [kɔːfai]) are small woody legume trees within the genus Sophora, in the family Fabaceae, that are native to New Zealand. There are eight species, with Sophora microphylla and Sophora tetraptera being large trees. Their natural habitat is beside streams and on the edges of forest, in lowland or mountain open areas. Kōwhai trees grow throughout the country and are a common feature in New Zealand gardens. Outside of New Zealand, kōwhai tend to be restricted to mild temperate maritime climates. The blooms of the kōwhai are widely regarded as being one of New Zealand's unofficial national flowers.

== Name ==
The Māori word kōwhai derives from the Proto-East Central Pacific word kōfai, used to refer to leguminous trees that grow pods and typically have distinct flowers. It is related to words in some other Polynesian languages that refer to different species that look superficially similar, such as Hawaiian: 'ōhai (Sesbania tomentosa), Tahitian: ofai (Sesbania grandiflora) and Marquesan kohai (Caesalpinia pulcherrima). Kōwhai is also the Māori word for the colour yellow. This is unique to Māori, as many other Polynesian languages use a word derived from Proto-Eastern Polynesian rega-rega, such as Samoan: lega and Cook Islands Māori: renga, and may represent the word for the flower replacing the older word. The spelling kowhai (without a macron) is common in New Zealand English.

== Taxonomy ==
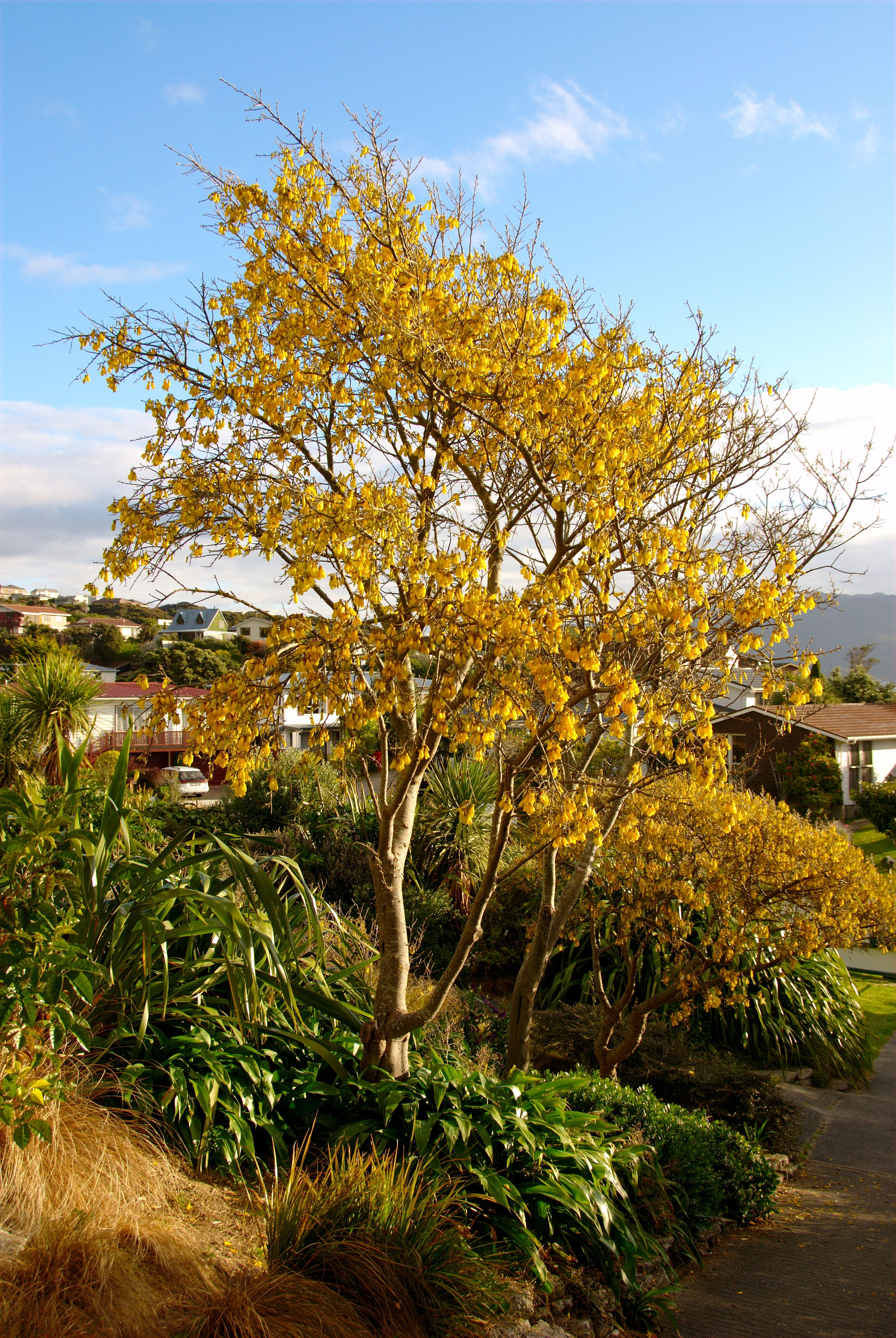
Kōwhai tree in full bloom, before foliage has emerged

Kōwhai is a name that can be used to describe any of the eight currently known species of Sophora that is native to New Zealand, of which the most commonly found species are Sophora microphylla and Sophora tetraptera. While all are members of the same genus, they do not form a clade. Sophora microphylla, for example, is more closely related to Sophora toromiro, an endemic species from Easter Island / Rapa Nui, than to Sophora prostrata. Sophora cassioides, found in Chile, may represent a species that spread to South America from New Zealand. Sophora is one of the four genera of native legumes in New Zealand; the other three are Carmichaelia, Clianthus, and Montigena.

Taxonomy of the New Zealand Sophora species is a complex issue due to shared morphological features, hybrids that can form between species, differences in juvenile stages of plants based on geography, and morphological features being inconsistent with genetic profiles. Sophora microphylla that grow in the southern and eastern South Island have variable and persistent juvenile forms, something not seen in plants that found in the North Island, potentially due to gene transfer from other kōwhai species. Three major species complexes exist in New Zealand that facilitate gene transfer. In the North Island, Sophora microphylla, Sophora chathamica, Sophora fulvida, Sophora godleyi and Sophora tetraptera can form hybrids, while Sophora microphylla, Sophora longicarinata and Sophora prostrata can hybridise in the South Island. Additionally, Sophora tetraptera, Sophora molloyi and Sophora godleyi can also form hybrids. As many species thrive in specific environments, hybrid forms may often struggle to persist in the wild, though areas with persistent hybrid forms of plants persist. Due to this hybridisation, specific species names can often be difficult to assign to individual plants.

=== Species ===
The eight currently accepted species of kōwhai are:

- Sophora chathamica, coastal kōwhai
- Sophora fulvida, Waitākere kōwhai
- Sophora godleyi, Godley's kōwhai
- Sophora longicarinata, limestone kōwhai
- Sophora microphylla, small-leaved kōwhai
- Sophora molloyi, Cook Strait kōwhai
- Sophora prostrata, prostrate kōwhai
- Sophora tetraptera, large-leaved kōwhai

== Description and ecology ==
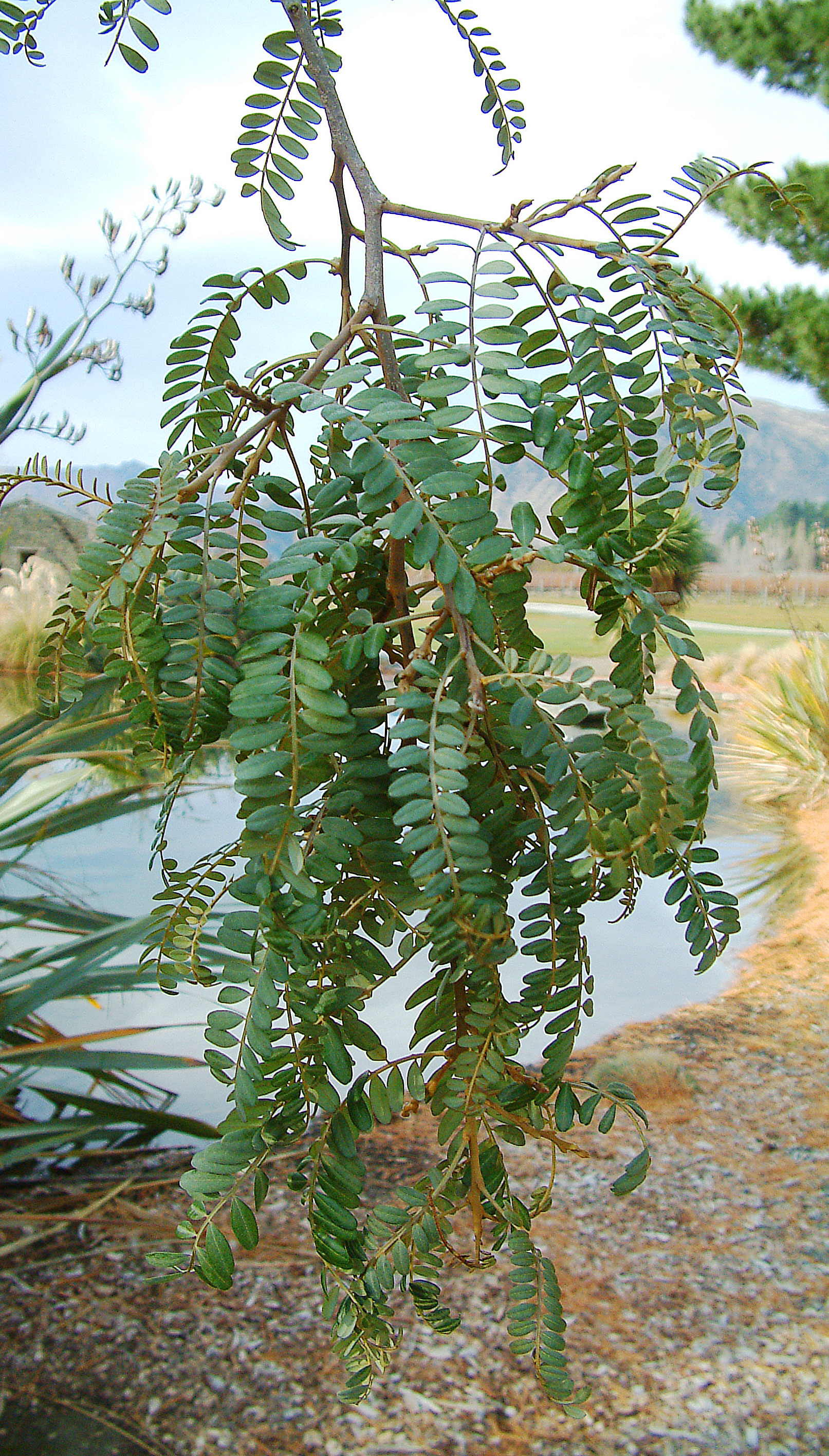
Sophora tetraptera foliage

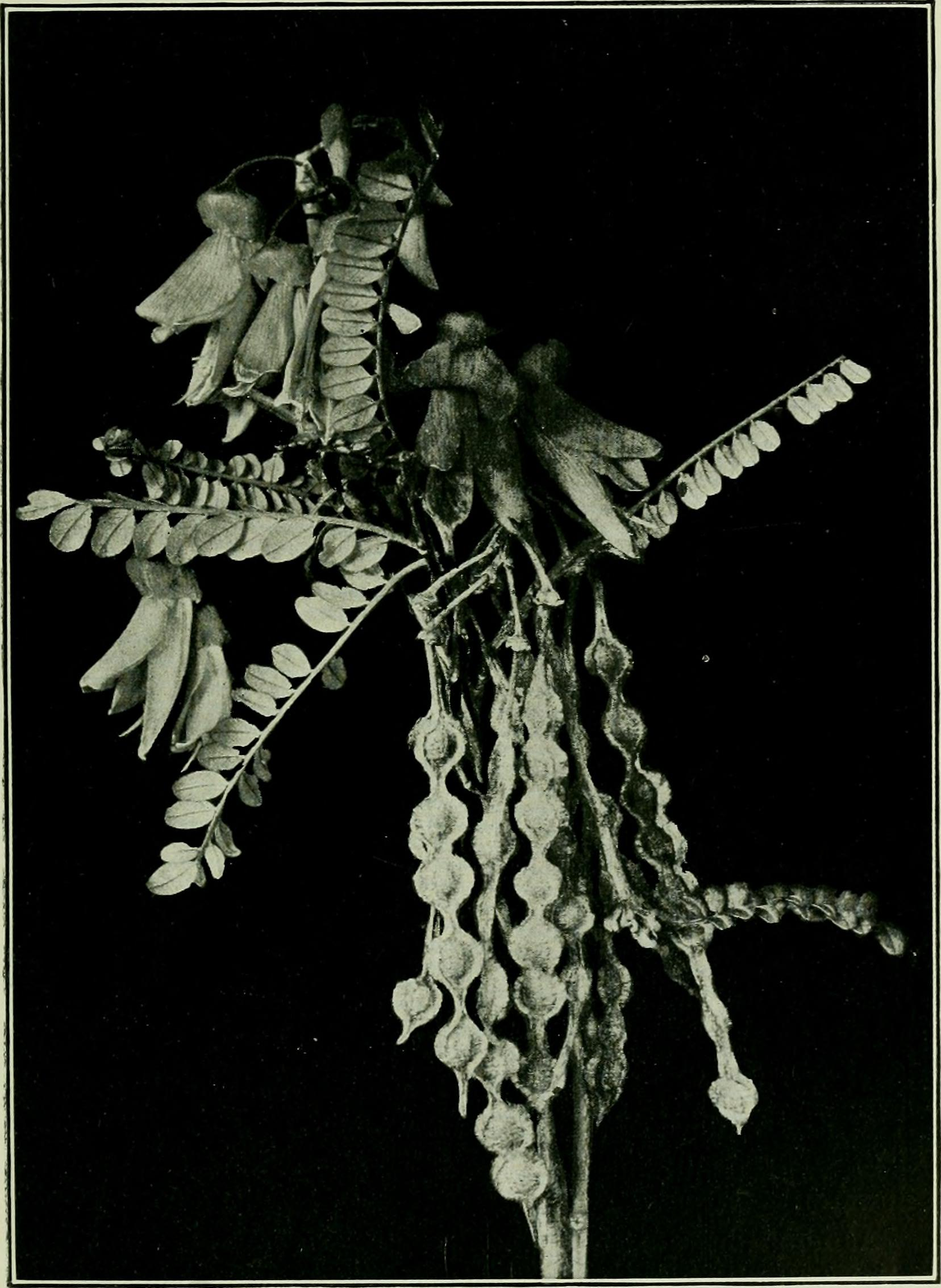
Sophora tetraptera flowers, foliage and seed pods

Most species of kōwhai grow to around 8 m (26 ft) high and have fairly smooth bark with small leaves. Sophora microphylla has smaller leaves (0.5–0.7 cm (0.20–0.28 in) long by 0.3–0.4 cm (0.12–0.16 in) wide) and flowers (2.5–3.5 cm (0.98–1.38 in) long) than Sophora tetraptera, which has leaves of 1–2 cm (0.39–0.79 in) long and flowers that are 3–5 cm (1.2–2.0 in) long.

The very distinctive seed pods that appear after flowering are almost segmented, and each contains six or more smooth, hard seeds. Most species have yellow seeds, but Sophora prostrata has black ones. The seeds of Sophora microphylla can be very numerous and the presence of many hundreds of these distinctively yellow seeds on the ground quickly identifies the presence of a nearby kōwhai tree. Many species of kōwhai are semi-deciduous and lose most of their leaves immediately after flowering in October or November, but quickly produce new leaves. Flowering of kōwhai is staggered from July through to November, meaning each tree will get attention from birds such as tūī, kererū and bellbird. The specific form and yellow petals of most kōwhai found in New Zealand is likely an adaptation to bird pollination from tūī and bellbirds. Tūī are very attracted to kōwhai and will fly long distances to get a sip of its nectar.

The wood of kōwhai is dense and strong, and has been used in the past for tools and machinery.

Studies of accumulated dried vegetation in the pre-human mid-late Holocene period suggests a low Sophora microphylla forest ecosystem in Central Otago that was used and perhaps maintained by giant moa birds, for both nesting material and food. The forests and moa no longer existed when European settlers came to the area in the 1850s.

== Cultivation ==
Kōwhai can be grown from seed or tip cuttings in spring and autumn. The dark or bright yellow seeds germinate best after chitting and being soaked in water for several hours. They can also benefit from a several minute submersion in boiling water to soften the hard shell and then being kept in the same water, taken off boil, for several hours to soak up the water. Young kōwhai are quite frost tender, so cuttings or seedlings should be planted in their second year when they are 30 cm or higher.

If grown from seed, kōwhai can take many years to flower, the number of years varies depending on the species.

Sophora prostrata, sometimes called "little baby", is used as a bonsai tree. It grows up to 2 m (6 ft 7 in) high, has divaricating stems, and sparse smallish leaves.

== Toxicity ==
All parts of the kōwhai, particularly the seeds, are poisonous to humans, due to the presence of cytisine. However, there do not appear to have been any confirmed cases in humans of severe poisoning following ingestion of kōwhai in New Zealand. Some reports exist of people becoming ill after using cutlery made from kōwhai wood, or from consuming kererū that had fed on the plant.

== Traditional Māori use ==
Traditionally the Māori used the flexible branches as a construction material in their houses and to snare birds. The kōwhai flowers were a source of yellow dye. The blooming of kōwhai flowers late winter and early spring was used as a seasonal indicator as a time to plant kūmara (sweet potato), and to begin harvesting kina (sea urchins).

Kōwhai are an important tree for rongoā (traditional medicine practices) for many iwi, particularly bark used to create an infusion known as wai kōwhai. The bark was heated in a calabash with hot stones, and made into a poultice to treat wounds or rubbed on a sore back or made into an infusion to treat bruising or muscular pains. If someone was bitten by a seal, an infusion was prepared from kōwhai and applied to the wounds and the patient was said to recover within days.

Additionally, wedges made of kōwhai stem were used to split wood, it was used for fences and in whare (Māori hut) construction, implements and weapons.

The current dispersal of kōwhai around New Zealand likely represents deliberate plantings by Māori, such as Te Āti Awa bringing Taranaki species of kōwhai to Wellington when some members of the iwi migrated to the area.

== Modern New Zealand iconography ==
Kōwhai's distinct yellow flowers are common in New Zealand-related iconography, and have been depicted on stamps and coins, are widely regarded as being one of New Zealand's unofficial national flowers. As such, it is often incorporated as a visual shorthand for the country, such as in Meghan Markle's wedding veil, which included distinctive flora representing all Commonwealth nations.
