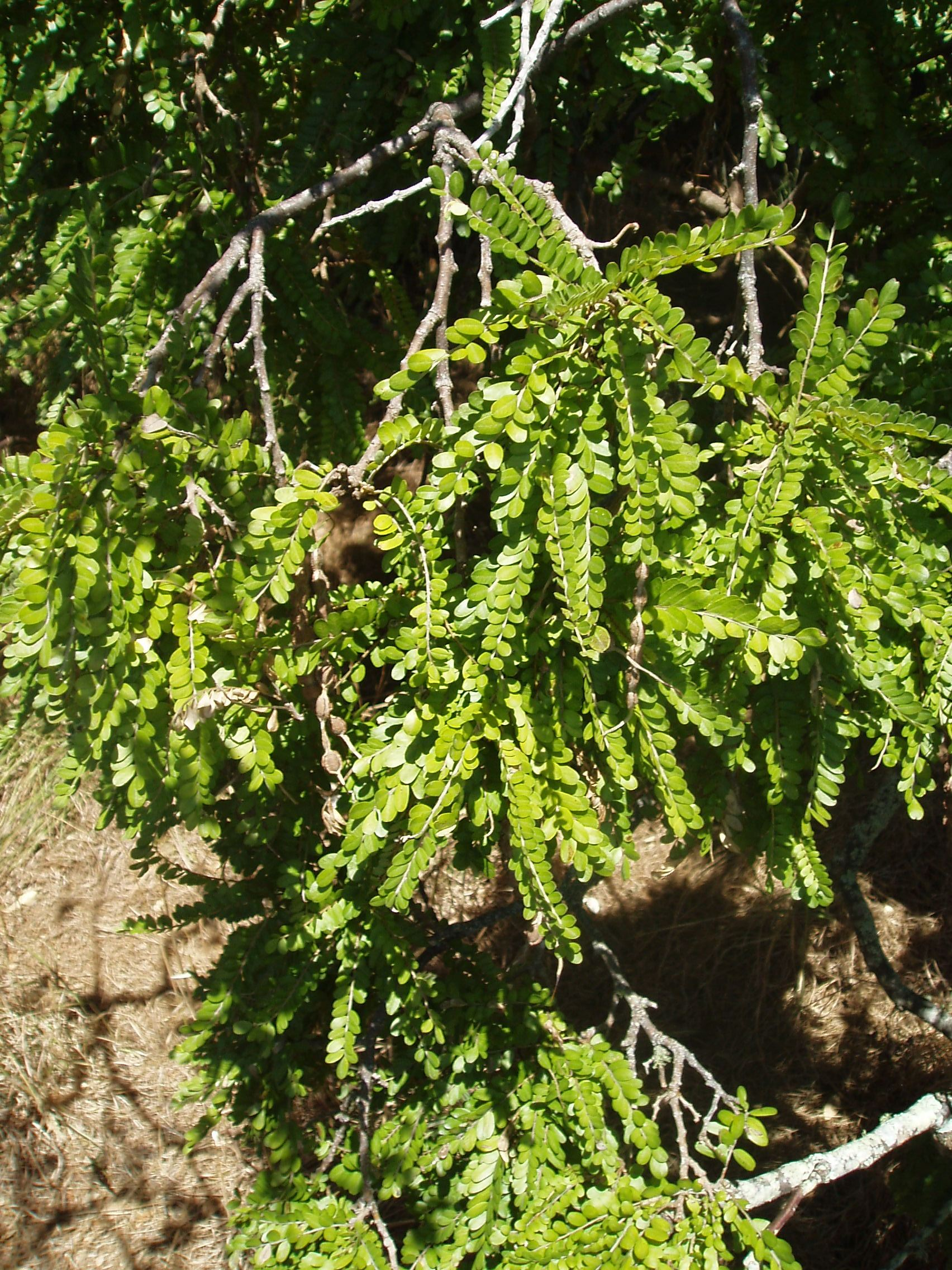

Scientific classification
- Kingdom: Plantae
- Clade: Tracheophytes
- Clade: Angiosperms
- Clade: Eudicots
- Clade: Rosids
- Order: Fabales
- Family: Fabaceae
- Subfamily: Faboideae
- Genus: Sophora
- Species: S. chathamica

Binomial name
- Sophora chathamica Cockayne

= Sophora chathamica =

Species of plant

Sophora chathamica, the coastal kōwhai, sometimes known as Chatham Island kōwhai, is one of 8 species of native sophora or kōwhai in New Zealand and grows naturally in the north-west of the North Island in New Zealand, as far south as the Tongaporutu River in north Taranaki, and as far north as Te Paki. It can also be found growing near Wellington and the Chatham Islands, although these later plantings are thought to be a result of Māori plantings in the late 18th century and early 19th century. Prior to 2001, it was included as variant of Sophora microphylla, therefore references to either Sophora microphylla var. chathamica or Sophora microphylla subsp. microphylla var. chathamica are considered references to coastal kowhai.

== Description ==
Coastal kōwhai forms a small tree up to 6 metres tall and 4 metres wide. It generally flowers from August until November. Flowers are yellow and around 3 cm long. Unlike many kōwhai species, coastal kōwhai lacks the divaricating juvenile stage when grown from seed.

== Conservation ==
As assessed by the New Zealand Threat Classification System, S. chathamica is not considered threatened.

== Cultivation ==
Coastal kōwhai is available from nurseries throughout New Zealand. There are also several cultivars available, including:

- The cultivar Milligold was selected by Duncan & Davies nursery for the new millennium (as Sophora microphylla var. chathamica, the classification in use at the time). It forms a small, compact tree with weeping branches and is sometimes listed as an evergreen.

== See also ==
- Kōwhai
