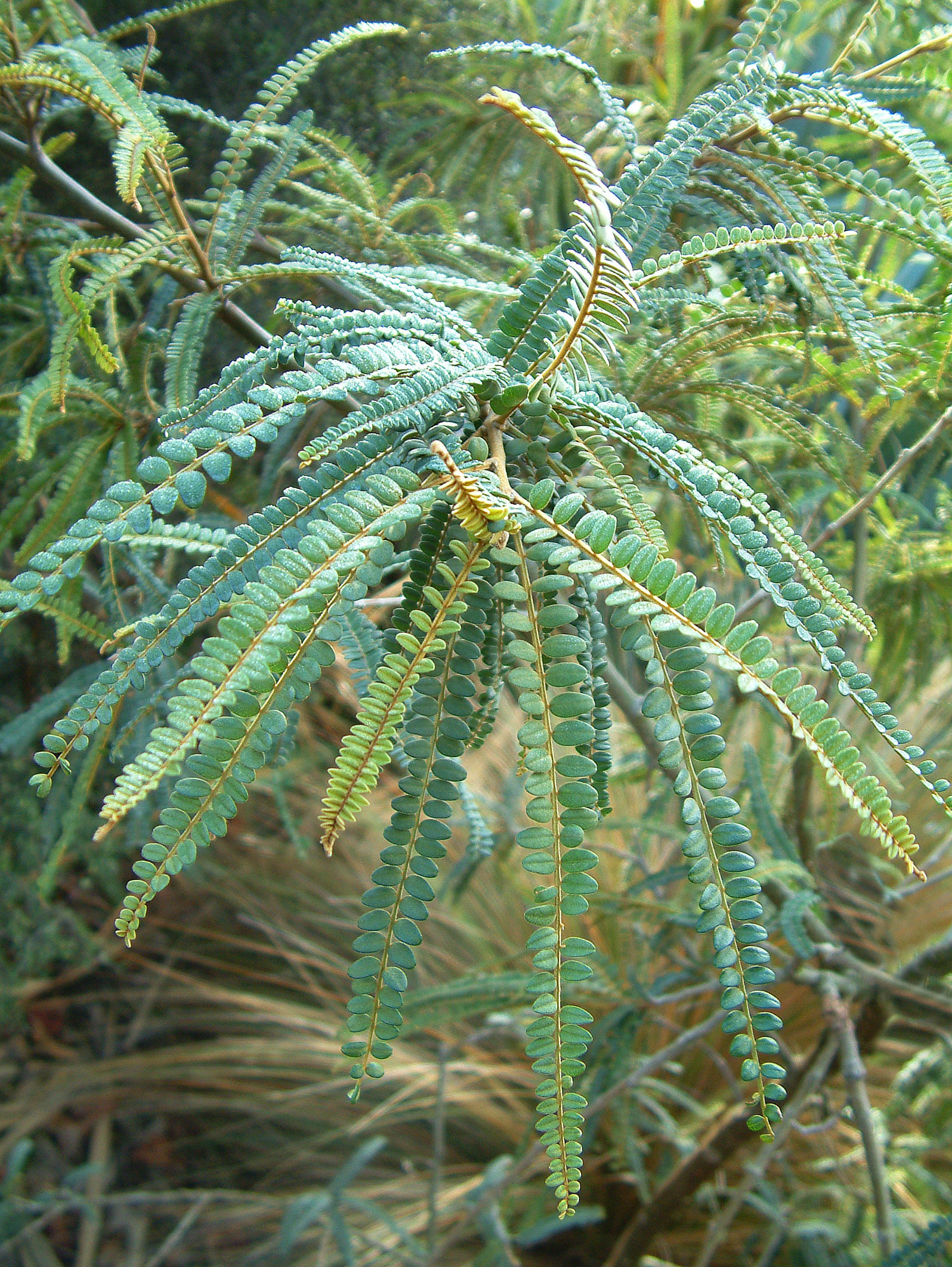
- Foliage of Godleys kōwhai

Conservation status
- Least Concern (IUCN 3.1)

- Not Threatened (NZ TCS)

Scientific classification
- Kingdom: Plantae
- Clade: Tracheophytes
- Clade: Angiosperms
- Clade: Eudicots
- Clade: Rosids
- Order: Fabales
- Family: Fabaceae
- Subfamily: Faboideae
- Genus: Sophora
- Species: S. godleyi

Binomial name
- Sophora godleyi Heenan & de Lange

= Sophora godleyi =

Species of plant

Sophora godleyi, also known as Godley's kōwhai, papa kōwhai or Rangitikei kōwhai, grows naturally in the west of the North Island of New Zealand from Te Kūiti to Manawatū. It is one of eight recognised species of kōwhai and was described as a separate species in 2001, having formerly been considered to be part of species small-leaved kōwhai. It is named after Dr. Eric Godley, former head of the Department of Scientific and Industrial Research (DSIR) Botany Division.

== Description ==
S. godleyi has a weeping habit with long pendulous branches and grey-green foliage, and can grow to height of about 25 metres. There is a profusion of yellow flowers around October/November making it one of the finest of New Zealand's native trees.

== Conservation ==
Using the New Zealand Threat Classification System, S. godleyi was rated in 2012 as being "not threatened", and this status continues.

== Cultivation ==
In horticulture it is possible to purchase 'regular' S. godleyi plants and it grows easily from seed. There are also at least two known cultivars, S. godleyi 'Goldies Mantle' and S. godleyi 'Ohingaiti'.

- The cultivar 'Goldies Mantle' was selected by John Goldie, who worked in the Levin Horticultural Research Centre of the DSIR. It was sourced from a parent plant near Ohingaiti (near Taihape). The plant grows into an attractive grey-green tree, bearing an abundant display of yellow flowers in spring, and can grow 5 metres or more. It is sometimes sold under its former name Sophora microphylla 'Goldies Mantle'.
- The cultivar ‘Ohingaiti’ is another cultivar originating from the Ohingaiti district. It is described as being similar to 'Goldies Mantle' but "still has the pendulous branches" that the base species is known for.
