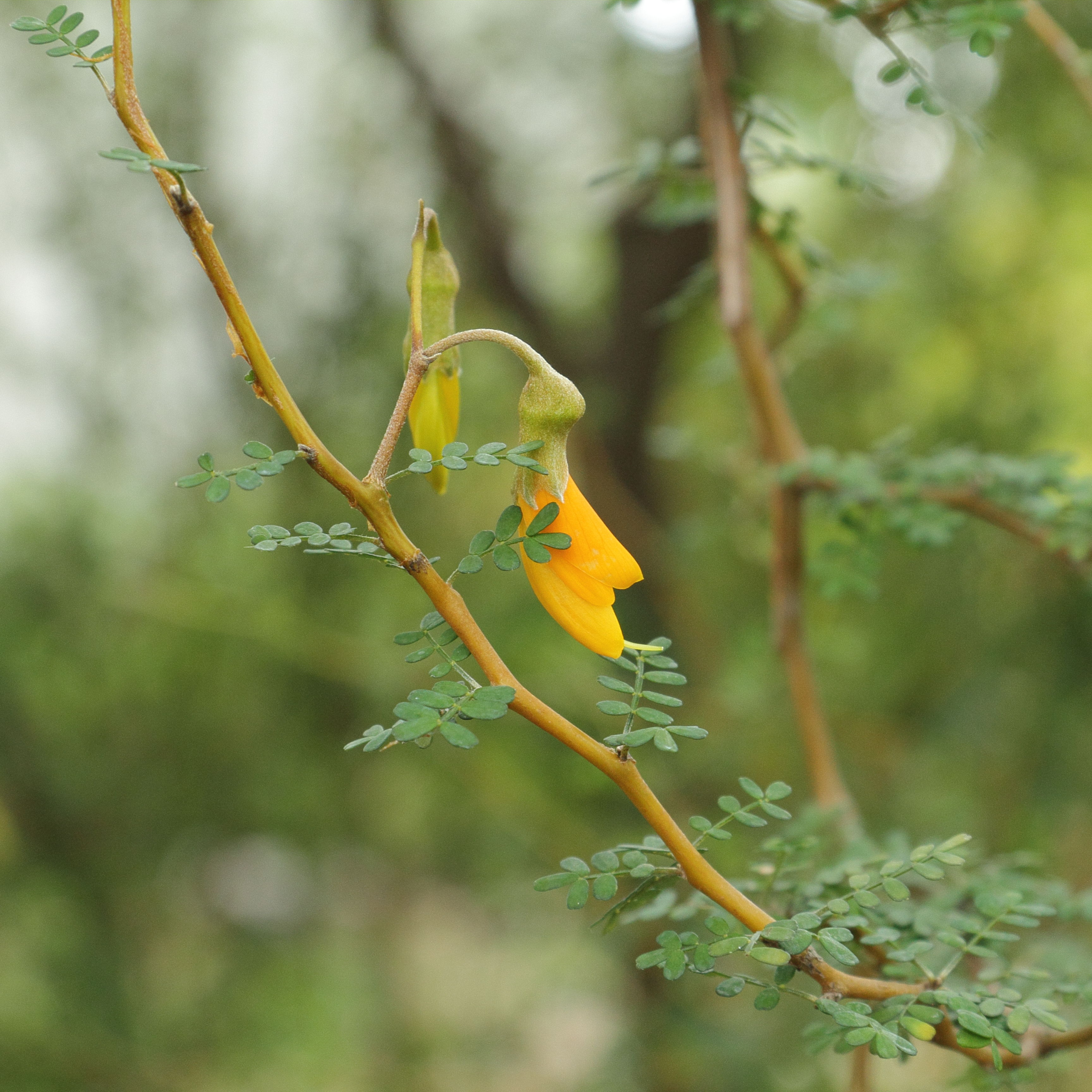
- Prostrate kōwhai with orange flower

Scientific classification
- Kingdom: Plantae
- Clade: Tracheophytes
- Clade: Angiosperms
- Clade: Eudicots
- Clade: Rosids
- Order: Fabales
- Family: Fabaceae
- Subfamily: Faboideae
- Genus: Sophora
- Species: S. prostrata

Binomial name
- Sophora prostrata Buchanan

= Sophora prostrata =

Species of plant

Sophora prostrata is commonly known as kōwhai, prostrate kōwhai or dwarf kōwhai and is endemic to the eastern South Island from Marlborough to the Waitaki Valley in New Zealand although most commonly found on the Banks Peninsula.

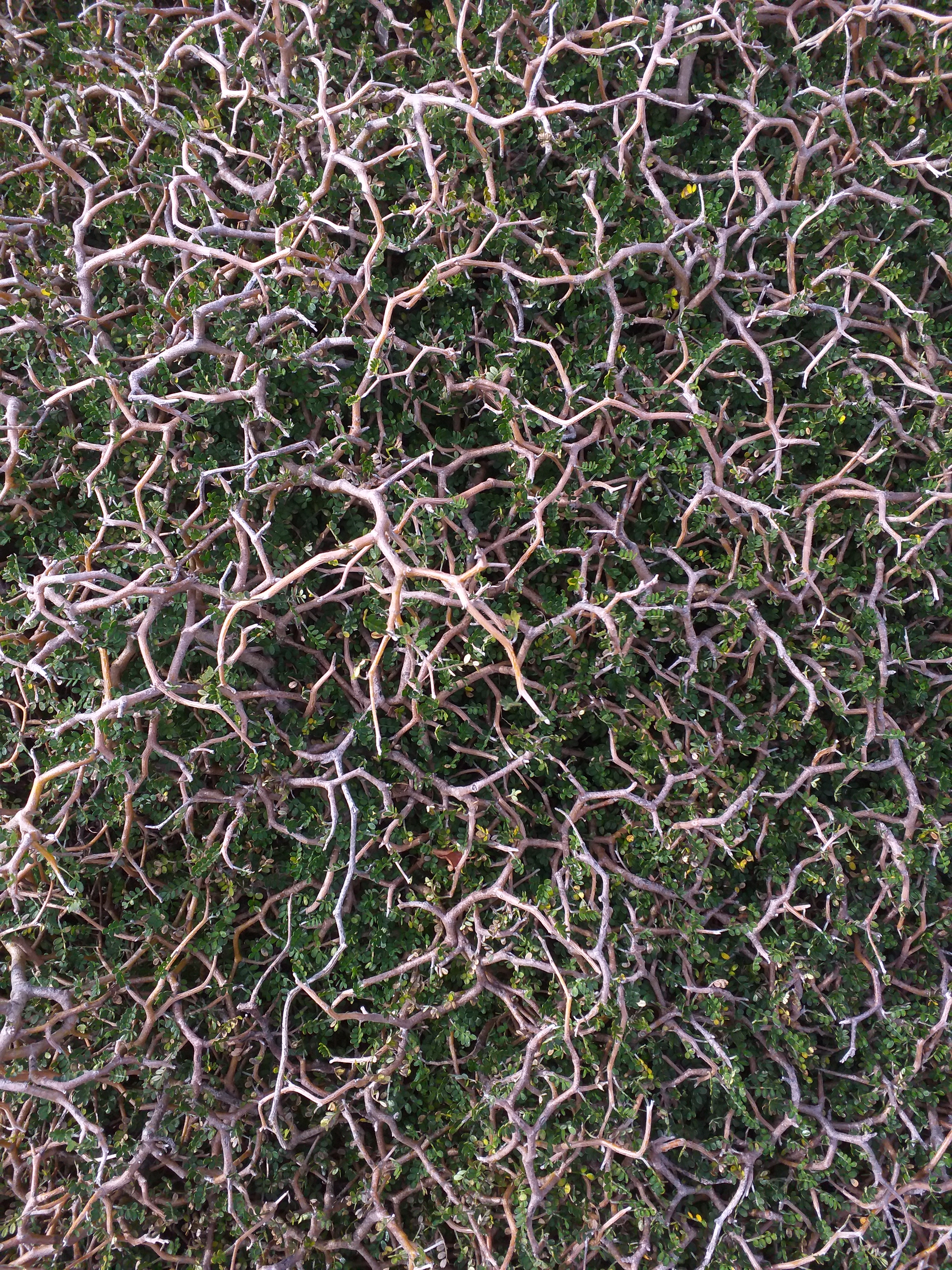
Divaricating growth habit in S. prostrata

It is a low growing shrub, reaching a height of around 2 metres. This species has a divaricating habit that lasts for the life of the shrub unlike other New Zealand Sophora species which lose the divaricating habit as adult trees.

The leaves of this species are usually quite small, up to about 2 cm in length.

Flowers are often orange though they do occur as yellow in common with most other kōwhai species. The seeds are black or very dark brown and may appear dark red. This contrasts with other native New Zealand Sophora species whose seeds are yellow.
