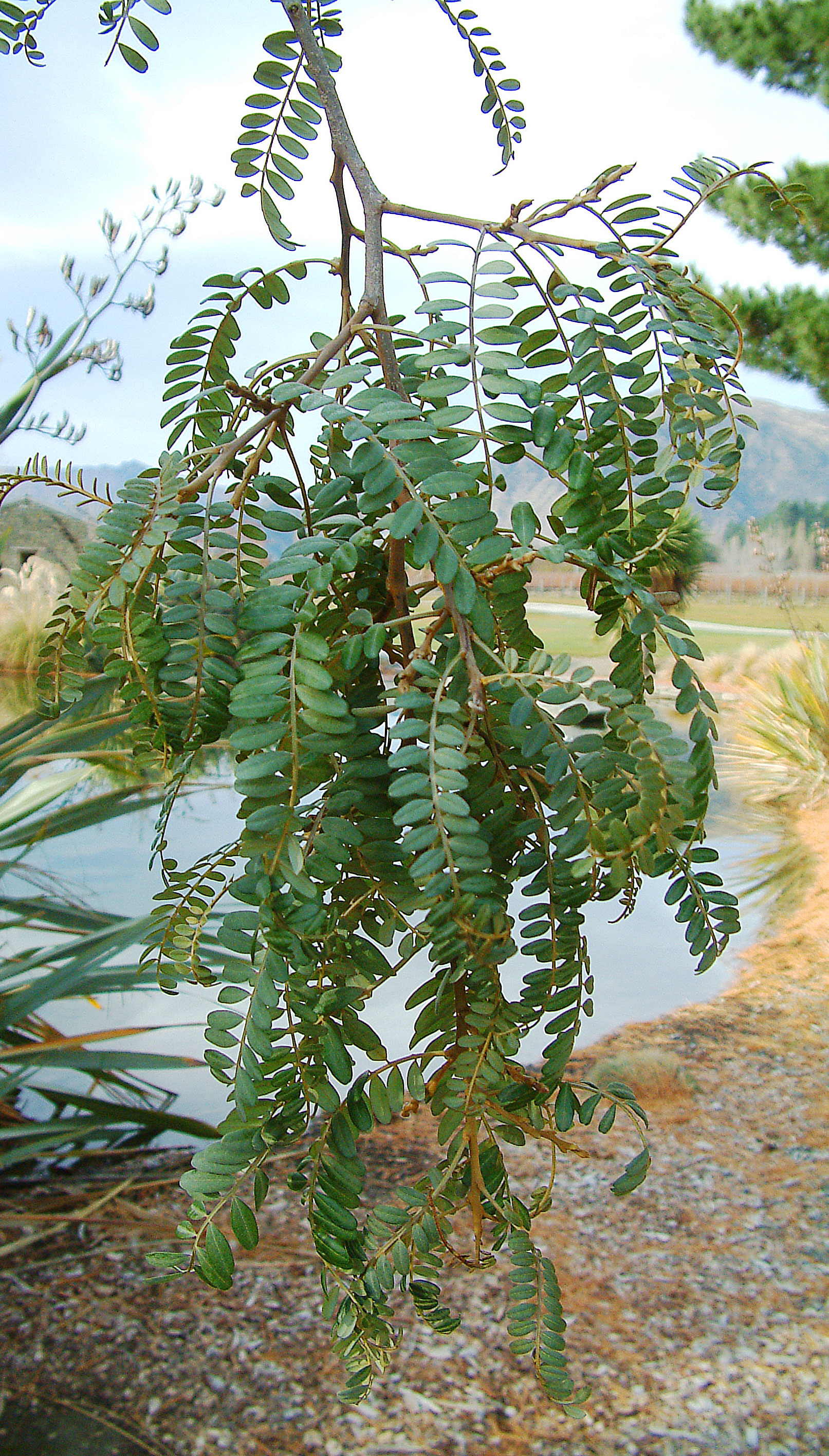
- Large-leaved kōwhai foliage

Conservation status
- Least Concern (IUCN 3.1)

Scientific classification
- Kingdom: Plantae
- Clade: Tracheophytes
- Clade: Angiosperms
- Clade: Eudicots
- Clade: Rosids
- Order: Fabales
- Family: Fabaceae
- Subfamily: Faboideae
- Genus: Sophora
- Species: S. tetraptera

Binomial name
- Sophora tetraptera J.S.Muell.

= Sophora tetraptera =

Species of plant

Sophora tetraptera, commonly known as large-leaved kōwhai, is a tree that grows naturally in the central east of the North Island of New Zealand. It has larger, more widely spaced, leaflets than the other seven species of kōwhai.

== Etymology ==
The generic name Sophora is from the Arabic sophora (any tree with pea-flowers). The specific epithet tetraptera derives from Greek and means 'four-winged' (referring to the fruits).

== Description ==
It grows as a tree up to 15 metres tall. Its leaves are 100–220 mm long, with leaflets 15–40 mm long. The leaflets are larger and more widely-spaced than on other kōwhai. Its yellow flowers appear from October (or as early as September) to December.

== Ecology ==
Sophora tetraptera is one of three known native species that hosts the native longhorn beetle Coptomma variegatum.

== Distribution and habitat ==
It occurs naturally in the east of the North Island of New Zealand, from East Cape south to the Wairarapa, and west toward Taihape, Lake Taupō and down the Waikato River to about Lake Karapiro. It commonly grows in forest and scrub in coastal areas, and lowland areas beside rivers and lakes. It can also grow in the ranges along rivers.

== Gallery ==
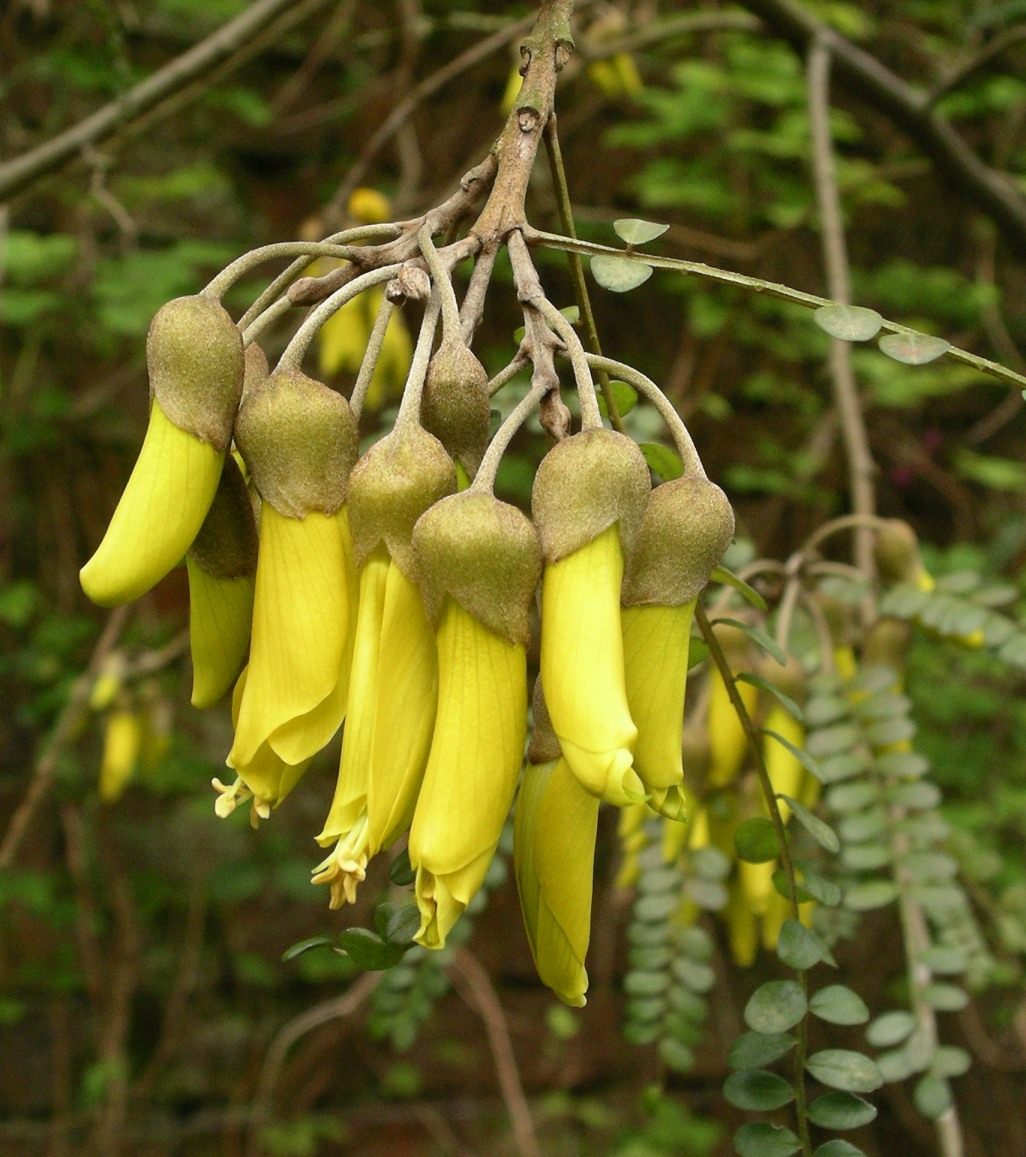
Large-leaved kōwhai flowers

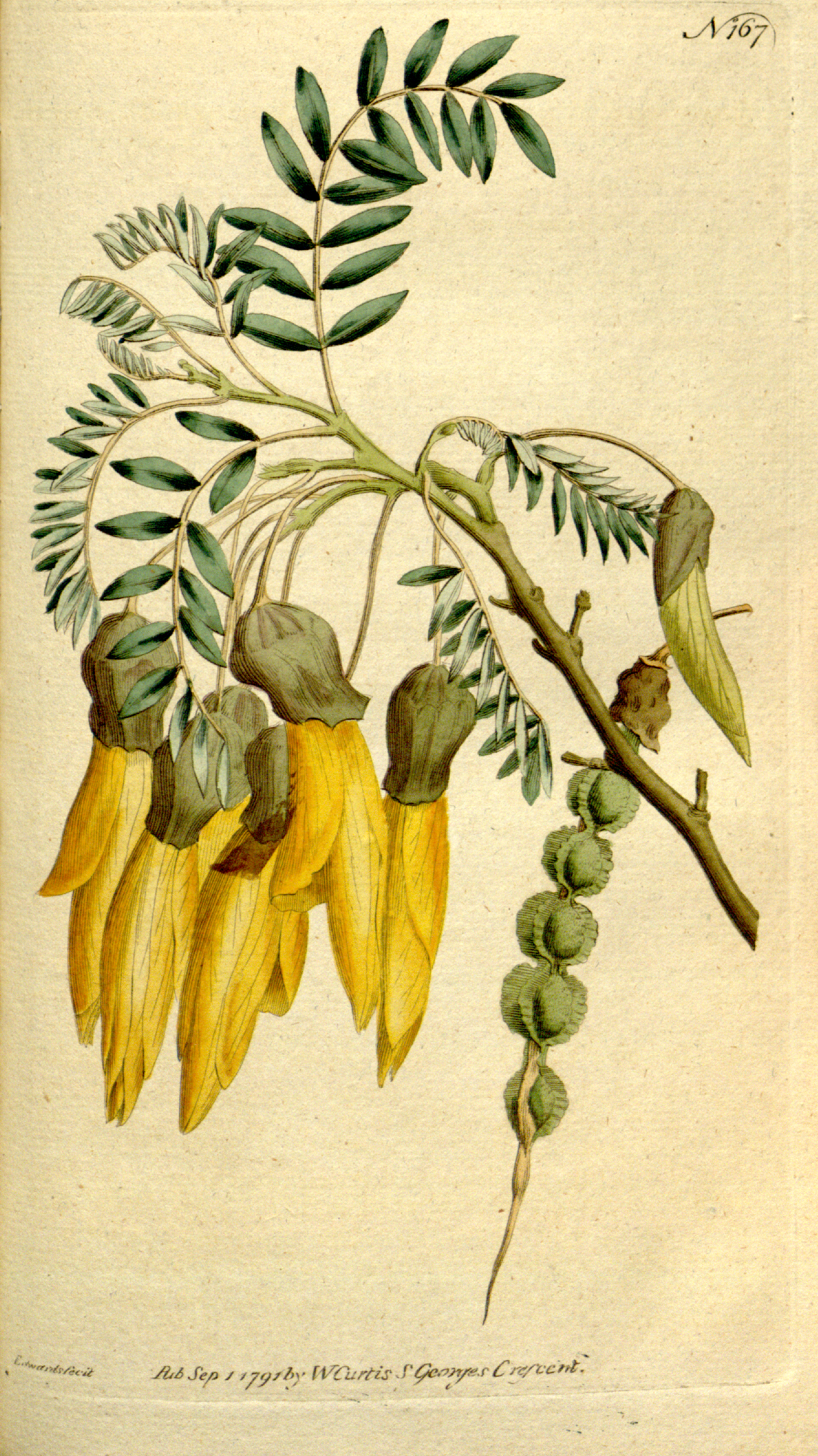
Botanical Magazine vol. 5: t. 167 (1792) S.T. Edwards
