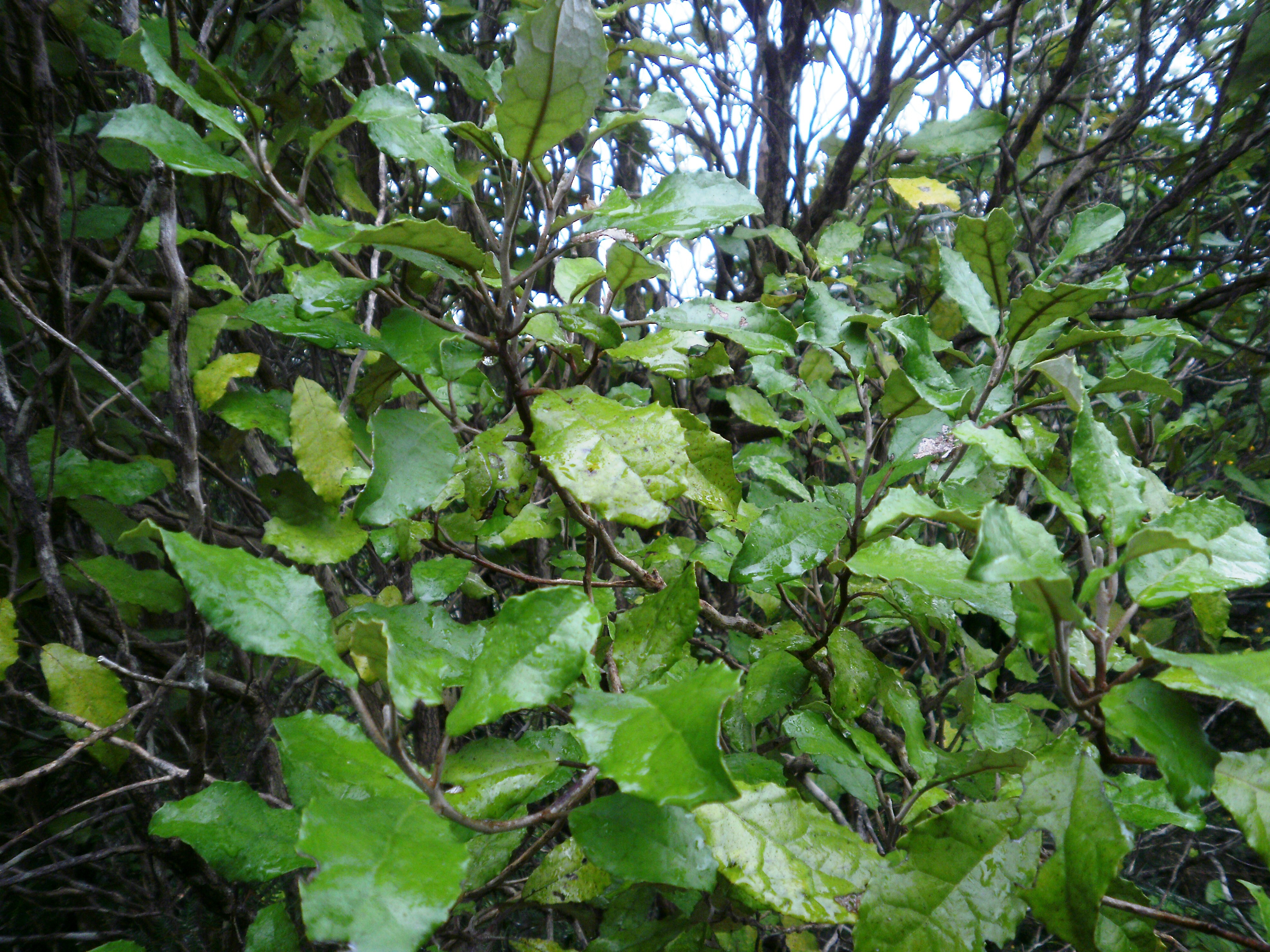
- Olearia rani foliage

Conservation status
- Least Concern (IUCN 3.1)

Scientific classification
- Kingdom: Plantae
- Clade: Tracheophytes
- Clade: Angiosperms
- Clade: Eudicots
- Clade: Asterids
- Order: Asterales
- Family: Asteraceae
- Genus: Olearia
- Species: O. rani

Binomial name
- Olearia rani (A.Cunn.) Druce

Synonyms
- Brachyglottis rani A.Cunn.; Eurybia cunninghamii Hook.f.

= Olearia rani =

Species of tree

Olearia rani, or heketara as it is known in Māori is a common small forest tree of New Zealand. It grows in lowland forest throughout the North Island and in the northern half of the South Island. Olearia rani var. rani has a more northern range than Olearia rani var. colorata which is found in forests from the Coromandel Peninsula south to the Buller River. Its leaves have white undersides and prominent veins. During spring the tree produces clusters of small white flowers.
