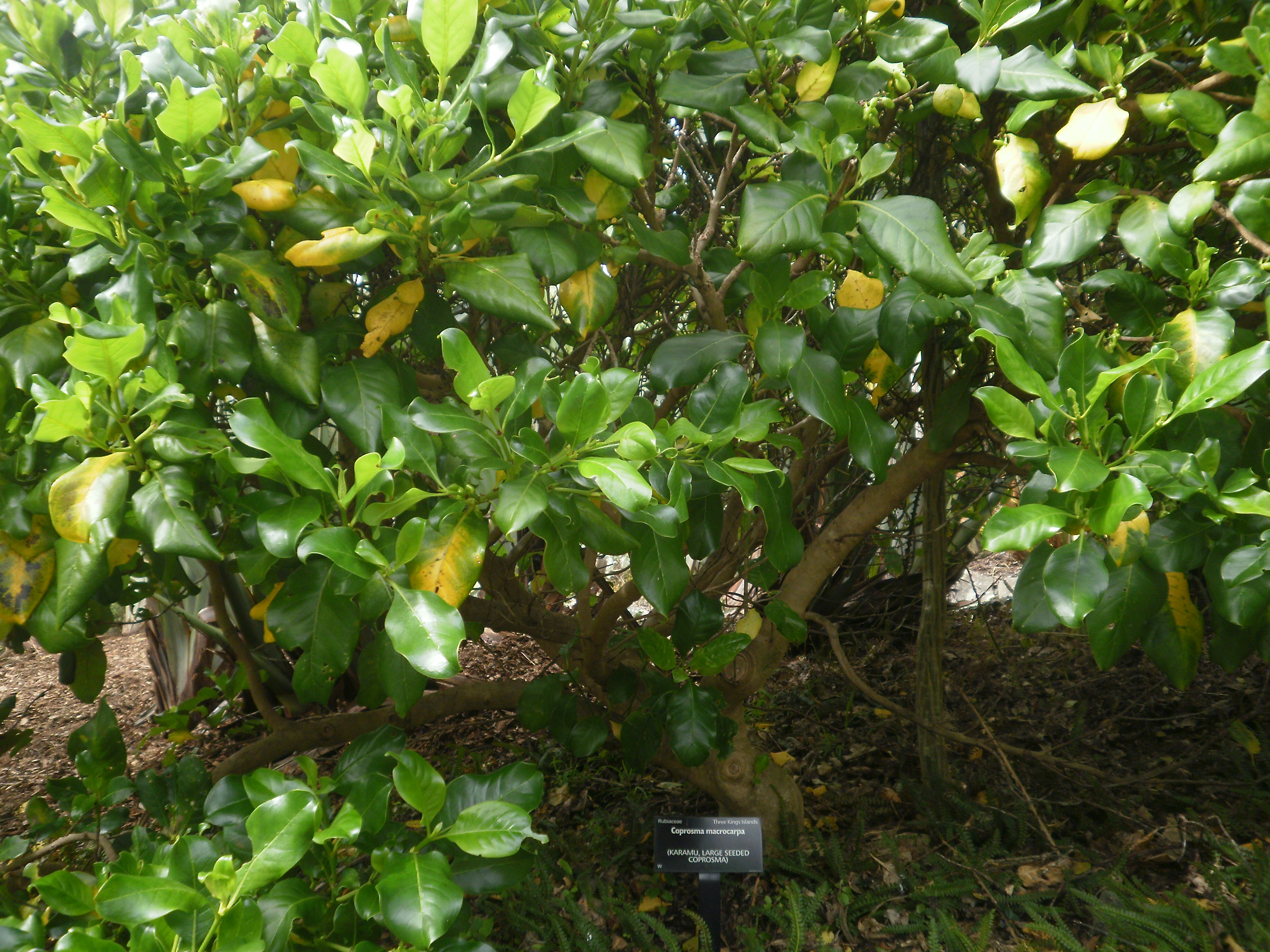

Scientific classification
- Kingdom: Plantae
- Clade: Tracheophytes
- Clade: Angiosperms
- Clade: Eudicots
- Clade: Asterids
- Order: Gentianales
- Family: Rubiaceae
- Genus: Coprosma
- Species: C. macrocarpa

Binomial name
- Coprosma macrocarpa Cheeseman, 1888

= Coprosma macrocarpa =

Species of plant

Coprosma macrocarpa, also known as large-seeded coprosma and coastal karamu, is a shrub native to New Zealand. It has large thick leaves and large bright red/orange berries. Macrocarpa means "large fruit".

There are two subspecies. C. macrocarpa subsp. macrocarpa ranges from a shrub to a 10-metre-tall (33 ft) tree. It occurs naturally on the Three Kings Islands. It is naturalised in the northern part of the North Island and around Wellington. C. macrocarpa subsp. minor is mostly a shrub up to 4 metres. It occurs in coastal areas from North Cape to East Cape and some offshore islands.
