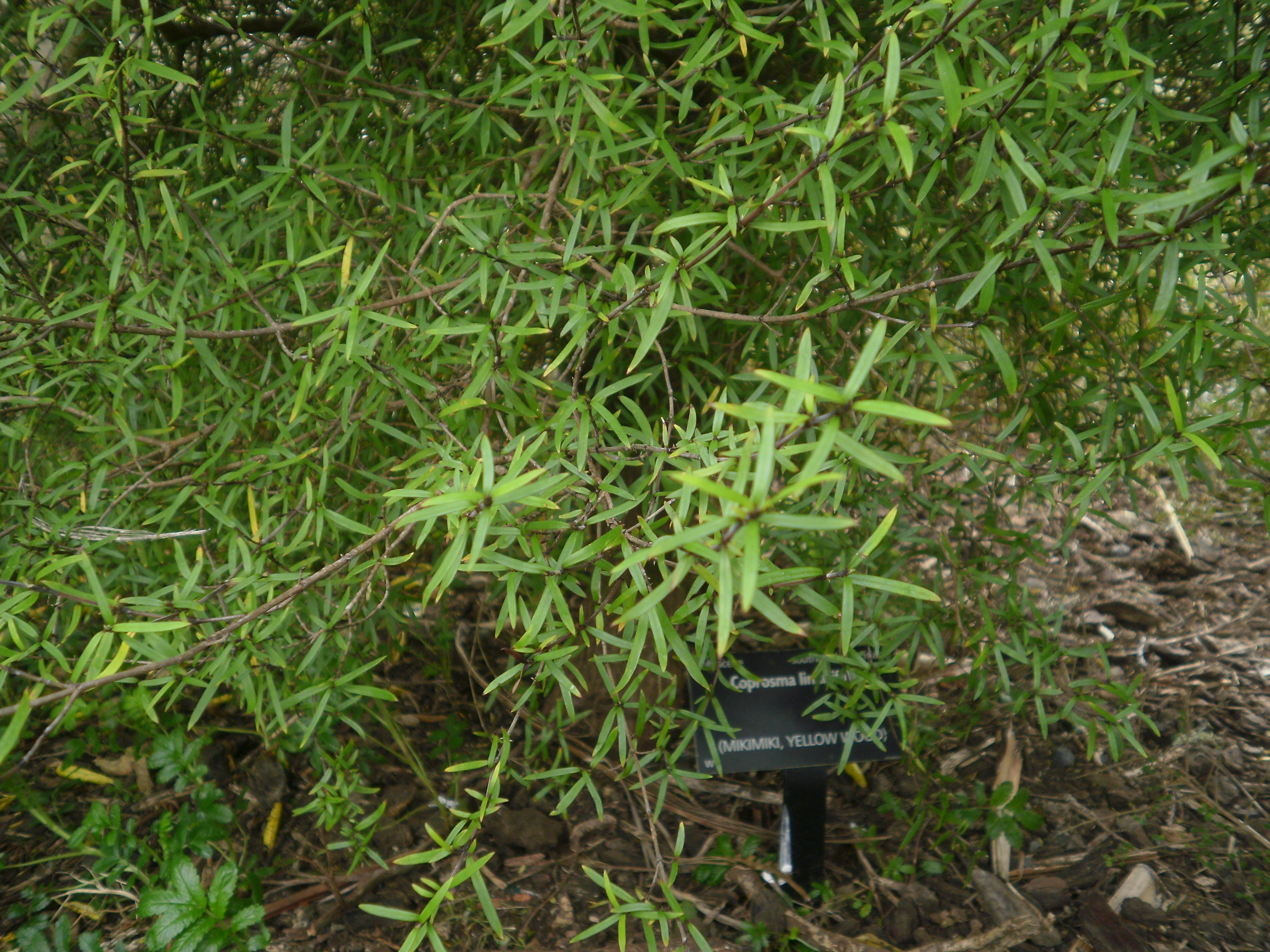

Scientific classification
- Kingdom: Plantae
- Clade: Tracheophytes
- Clade: Angiosperms
- Clade: Eudicots
- Clade: Asterids
- Order: Gentianales
- Family: Rubiaceae
- Genus: Coprosma
- Species: C. linariifolia

Binomial name
- Coprosma linariifolia Hook.f.

= Coprosma linariifolia =

Species of plant endemic to New Zealand

Coprosma linariifolia, commonly known as mikimiki or yellow wood, is a shrub or small tree that is native to New Zealand, C. linariifolia is found in lowland to montane forest and scrub from the central North Island to the bottom of the South Island.

Coprosma linariifolia can grow up to 8 metres tall and has grey coloured bark. It has long elliptical leaves and the inner bark is yellow.
