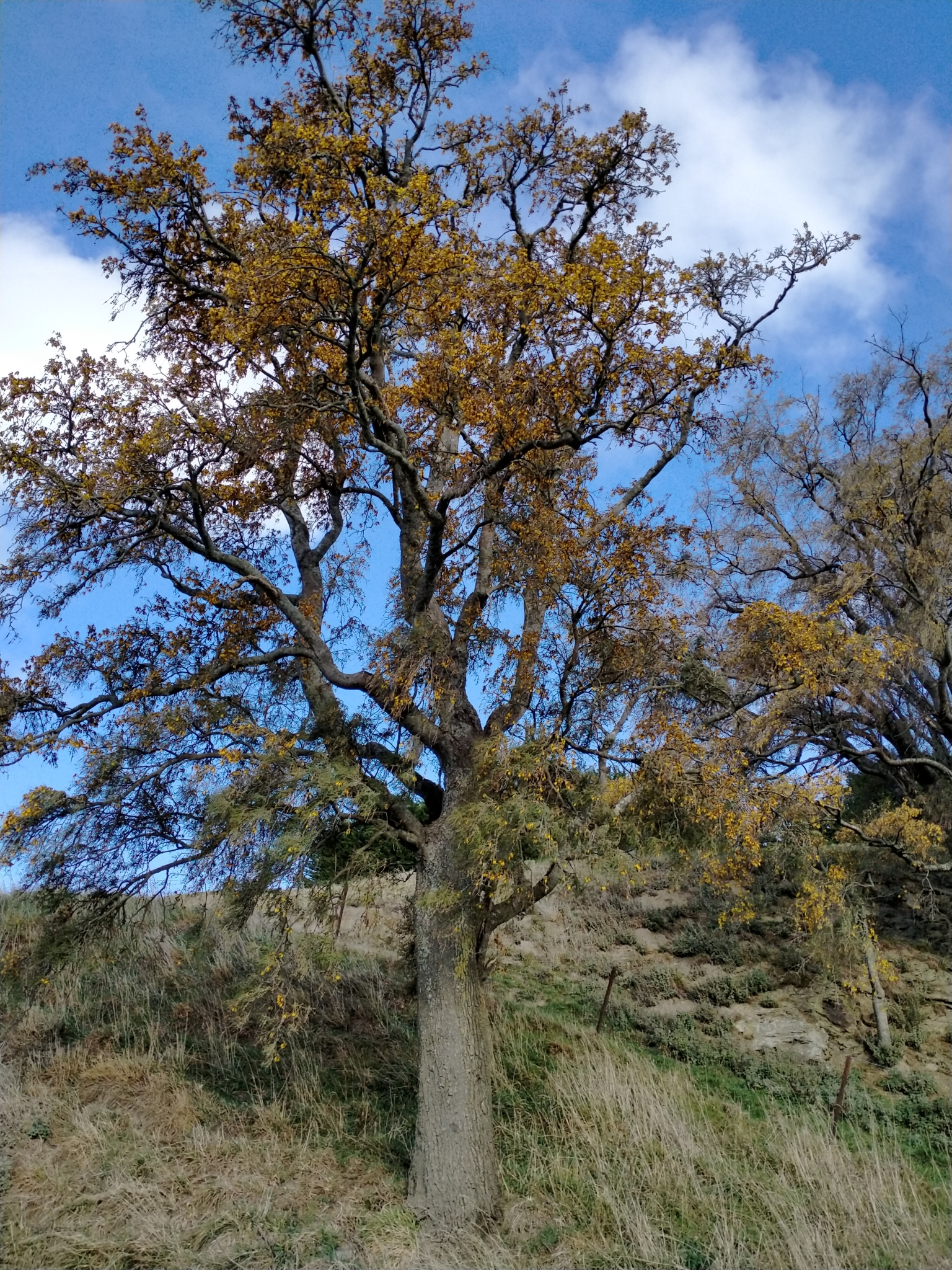
- Sophora microphylla in full bloom

Conservation status
- Not Threatened (NZ TCS)

Scientific classification
- Kingdom: Plantae
- Clade: Tracheophytes
- Clade: Angiosperms
- Clade: Eudicots
- Clade: Rosids
- Order: Fabales
- Family: Fabaceae
- Subfamily: Faboideae
- Genus: Sophora
- Species: S. microphylla

Binomial name
- Sophora microphylla Aiton

Synonyms
- Edwardsia grandiflora var. microphylla Hook.f.; Edwardsia microphylla Salisb.; Sophora tetraptera var. microphylla Hook.f.

= Sophora microphylla =

Species of flowering plant

Sophora microphylla, commonly known as kōwhai, weeping kōwhai, and small-leaved kōwhai, is a species of tree in the family Fabaceae. It reaches 25 metres (80 feet) in height, with a trunk up to 90 cm (35 in) in diameter. It is endemic to New Zealand; its range mainly covers the South Island, but is also present in the North Island. S. microphylla is found in various habitats. The species is known for its vibrant, yellow, drooping flowers and weeping branches.

Sophora microphylla was first described by the Scottish botanist William Aiton in 1789. S. microphylla is pollinated by birds; the tūī (Prosthemadera novaeseelandiae) are especially attracted to the flowers, and will travel long distances in search of them. The seeds are dispersed by gravity, wind, or by water. All parts of the plant, especially the seeds, are poisonous. The primary alkaloid responsible for the toxicity is called cytisine. S. microphylla did have a variety of uses for indigenous Māori people and European settlers, both as timber and medicinally. The flowers of the New Zealand kōwhai (Sophora sp.) are unofficially recognised as the national flowers of New Zealand.

== Description ==
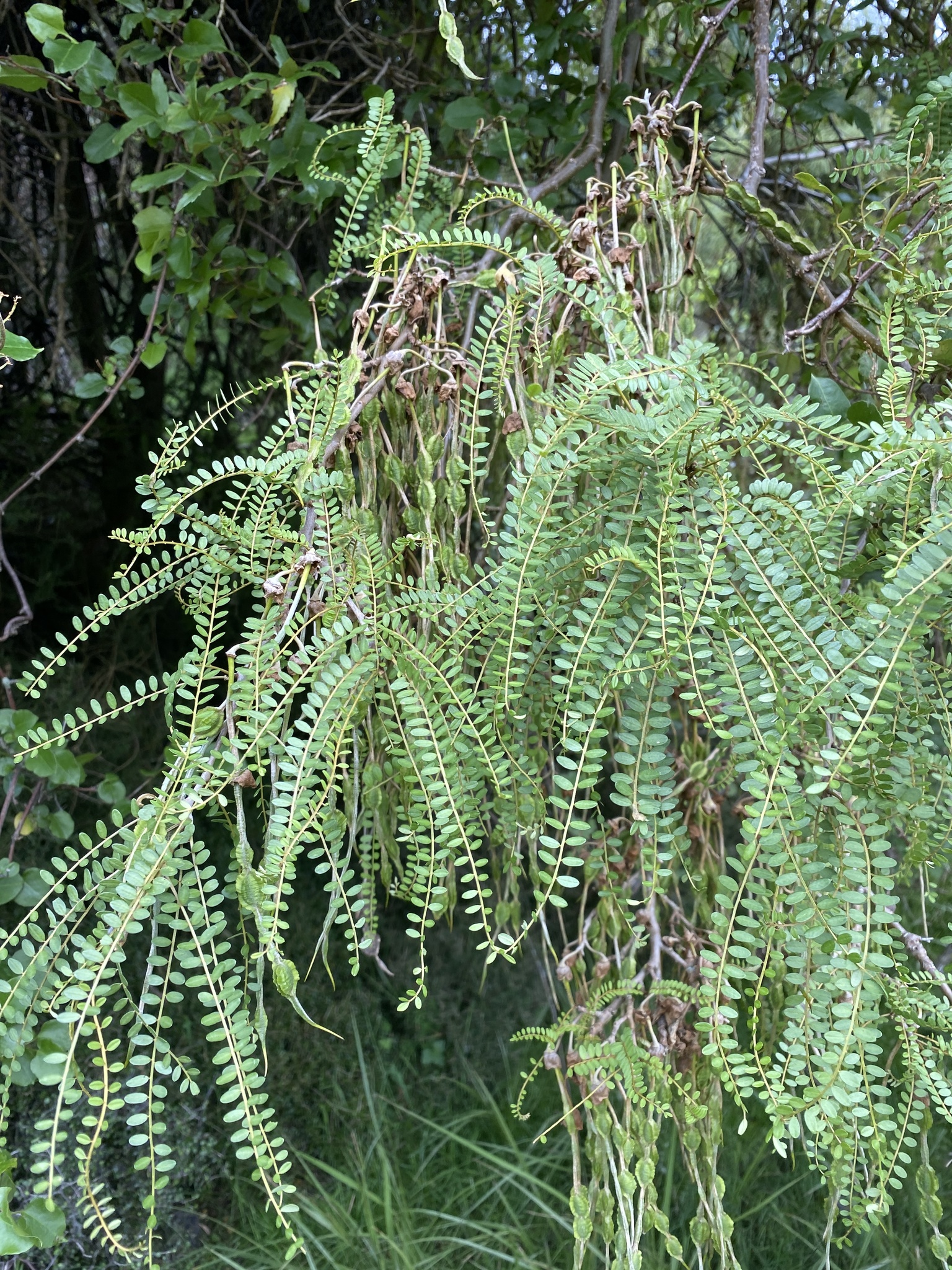
Pinnate leaves

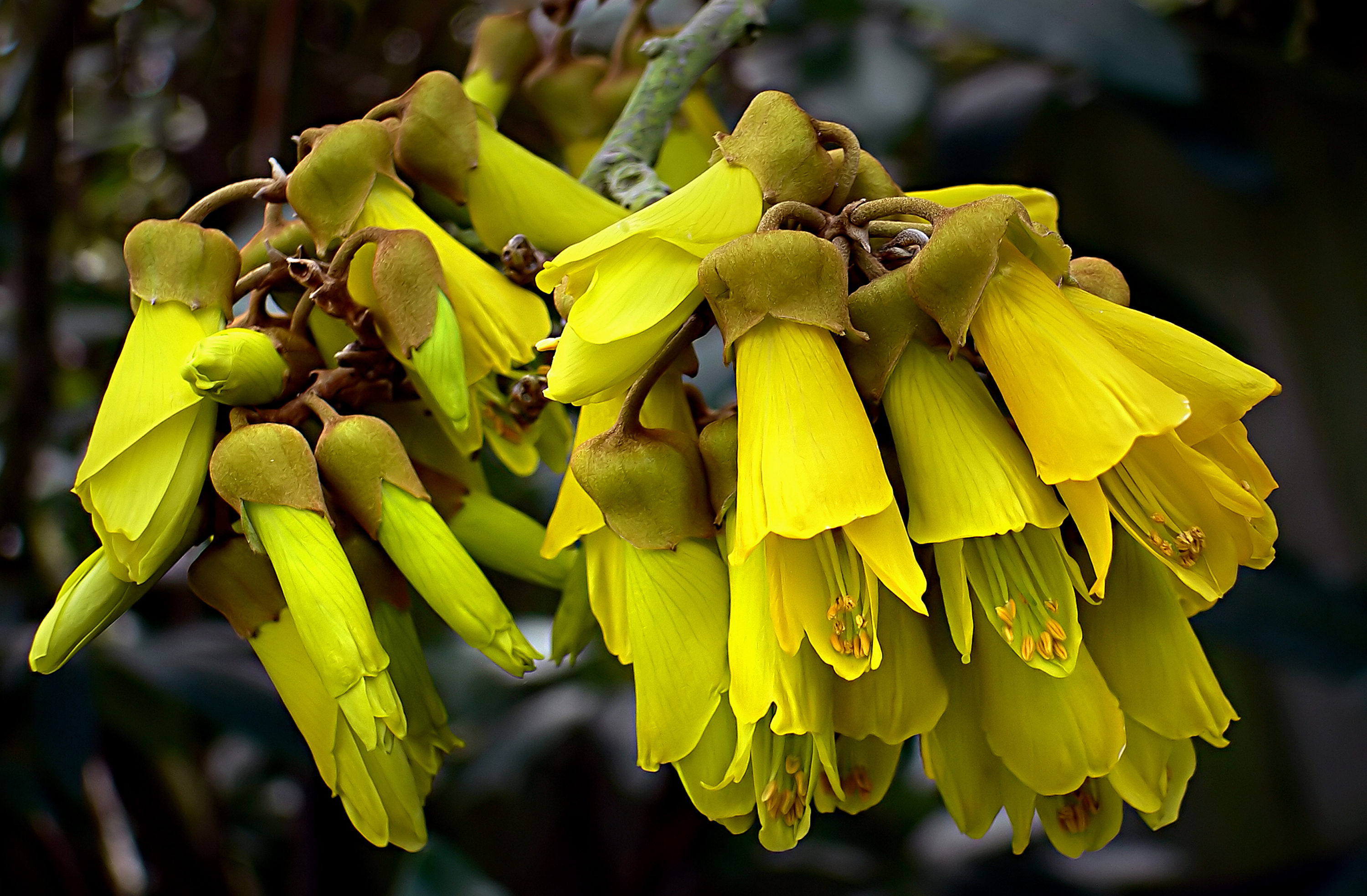
Vibrant yellow, drooping, flowers

Sophora microphylla is a moderate to large tree in the family Fabaceae. It reaches 25 metres (80 feet) in height, with a trunk up to 90 cm (35 in) in diameter, although more commonly 60 cm (24 in) in diameter. The bark is smooth and greyish-brown in colour. Branches are weeping and spreading. The wood of the New Zealand Sophora is dense, very durable, tough, and is of high value. The sapwood is pale-brown and the heartwood is yellowish-brown. It is straight-grained.

Sophora microphylla's young form is distinct in that it resembles a small, bushy, divaricating shrub. The branchlets are initially glabrous, but then transition to pubescent in adulthood. Young leaves are arranged alternately, and very small, growing on yellow to orange-brown interwoven twigs. The leaflets are 3.0–5.8 × 2.3–4. mm long, broadly obovate to nearly circular in character, ranging from almost hairless to lightly hairy, and spaced apart rather than crowded or overlapping. Adult leaves are up to 15 cm (5.9 in) long and generally pinnate. Leaflets on adults are 4.5–12.5 × 2.3–5.7 mm long, usually broadly elliptic to obovate, and are not crowded or overlapping. The upper surface is light green to green, and the under surface is light green. They are moderately hairy.

The inflorescences (flower clusters) have up to seven flowers per cluster. The peduncles are 10–25 mm long, and the pedicels are up to 16 mm long. Flowering generally occurs from August to October, but may start in May. Flowers are drooping and bright yellow in colour. The bracts (specialised leaf structures) are 1.8–3.4 mm long. The calyxs are 5–11 × 7–10 mm long, and shaped like a cup. The corollas are yellow. The ovaries are 8–17 mm long. The styles 10–15 mm long. The anthers (pollen containing parts) are 2.0–2.5 × 1.0—1.3 mm long.

Sophora microphylla's seeds are found in long, brown, pea-like pod structures. Fruiting occurs from October to May. The seed pods are 50–200 mm long, ridged, and contain up to 12 seeds. The seeds are 5.5–8.5 × 4.0–5.5 mm long, and yellowish in colour. S. microphylla has a diploid chromosome count of 18.

== Taxonomy ==
Sophora microphylla was first described by the Scottish botanist William Aiton in 1789. There are 64 species of the Sophora genus currently accepted by the Plants of the World Online taxonomic database. These species are found throughout the entire world. There are three recognised synonyms of the species, Edwardsia grandiflora var. microphylla and Sophora tetraptera var. microphylla described by the botanist Joseph Dalton Hooker, and Edwardsia microphylla described by the botanist Richard Anthony Salisbury. There are eight species native to New Zealand. Sophora is a relatively recent arrival to the New Zealand flora, having diverged an estimated two million years ago. S. microphylla is categorised in section Edwardsia of the Sophora genus. S. microphylla is most closely related to toromiro (S. toromiro). The biogeographic and phylogenetic characteristics of the section Edwardsia in the Sophora genus were studied by Peña et al. (2000).

=== Etymology ===
The etymology (word origin) of S. microphylla's genus name, Sophora, derives from the Arabic word sufayra which refers to trees in the Fabaceae, the pea family. The specific epithet (second part of the scientific name), microphylla, means 'small leaf', and refers to the small leaves of this species compared to other members of the genus. The species is commonly known as kōwhai, weeping kōwhai, and small-leaved kōwhai. It is also referred to as the common kōwhai or the South Island kōwhai. The word 'kōwhai' comes from koofai, a word used in an ancient Polynesian language for 'pod-bearing' plants. The word 'kōwhai' is also the Māori language word for the colour yellow.

== Ecology ==
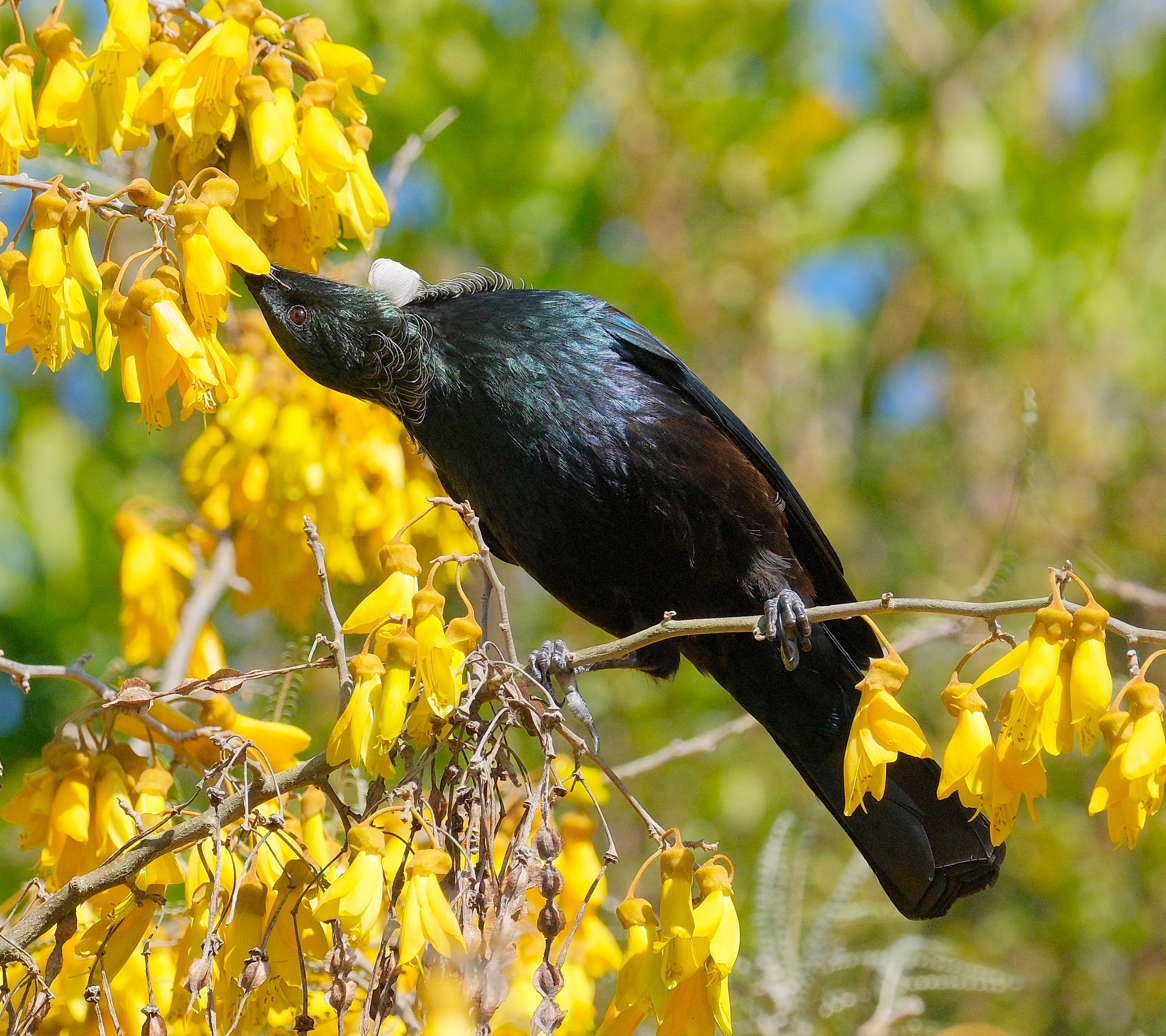
A tūī visiting the flowers

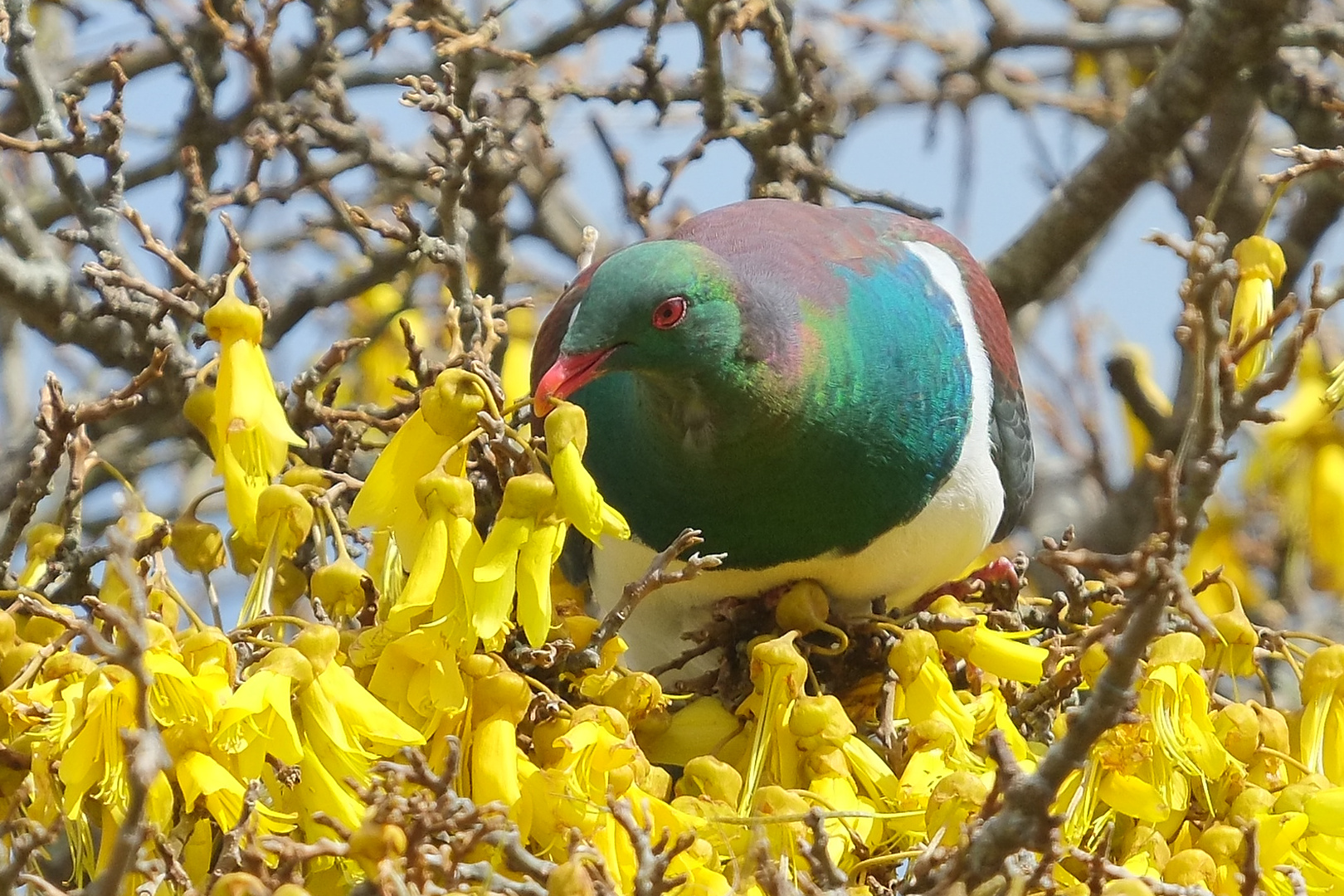
A kererū picking the flowers

Sophora microphylla's seeds are dispersed by gravity, wind, or by water. The seed pods of the Sophora genus can travel long distances in water through transoceanic dispersal. S. microphylla is pollinated by birds; the tūī (Prosthemadera novaeseelandiae) are especially attracted to the flowers and are the primary pollinator of the species. They will also travel long distances in search of it and defend the tree from other birds. Other birds, such as the New Zealand bellbird (Anthornis melanura), kākā (Nestor meridionalis), and silvereyes (Zosterops lateralis) also visit the flowers, either for nectar or pollen, as the flowers produce large amounts of nectar.

The introduced birds, chaffinches (Fringilla coelebs) and house sparrows (Passer domesticus) are recorded as floral visitors, as well as butterflies and bees. The native kererū (Hemiphaga novaeseelandiae) instead eat or browse the leaves and flowers. Several beetles and caterpillars feed on the plant, including the kōwhai moth (Uresiphita polygonalis), variegated longhorn (Coptomma variegatum), and lemon tree borer (Oemona hirta). New Zealand drywood termites (Kalotermes brouni) can establish themselves inside the heartwood of the tree. The New Zealand praying mantis (Orthodera novaezealandiae) lays its ootheca, egg cases, on the tree. S. microphylla also supports gall midges and weevils. New Zealand fantails (Rhipidura fuliginosa) can also be attracted to the tree to browse for insects that may be on it. Research by Pole (2022) suggests that the now-extinct, moa, consumed Sophora species, but were not effective at dispersing the seeds.

Sophora microphylla has low to moderate flammability rates, according to a 2016 study. A nitrogen-fixating plant, S. microphylla's nodules (specialised root structures) can improve soil quality. These nodules are found on their roots. S. microphylla can be brevideciduous or semideciduous in some southern localities. The terms brevideciduous and semideciduous refer to plants that lose their leaves, either entirely for a very brief period or partially, respectively.

=== Toxins ===
The primary alkaloid responsible for S. microphylla's toxicity is called cytisine. Every part of S. microphylla, especially the seeds, is poisonous to humans and some other animals. Other alkaloids found in Sophora include, but is not limited to: anagyrine, diosmin, hesperidin, and matrine. There are reports of people becoming seriously ill after using cutlery made from Sophora wood or from consuming birds that had fed on the plant. Poisoning symptoms may include an increased heart rate, loss of coordination, muscle twitching, nausea, and vomiting. In severe cases, paralysis and respiratory failure may occur. The ingestion of Sophora leaves in cattle has resulted in several deaths, and the seeds have been proven to be toxic to mice and honeybees.

== Distribution ==
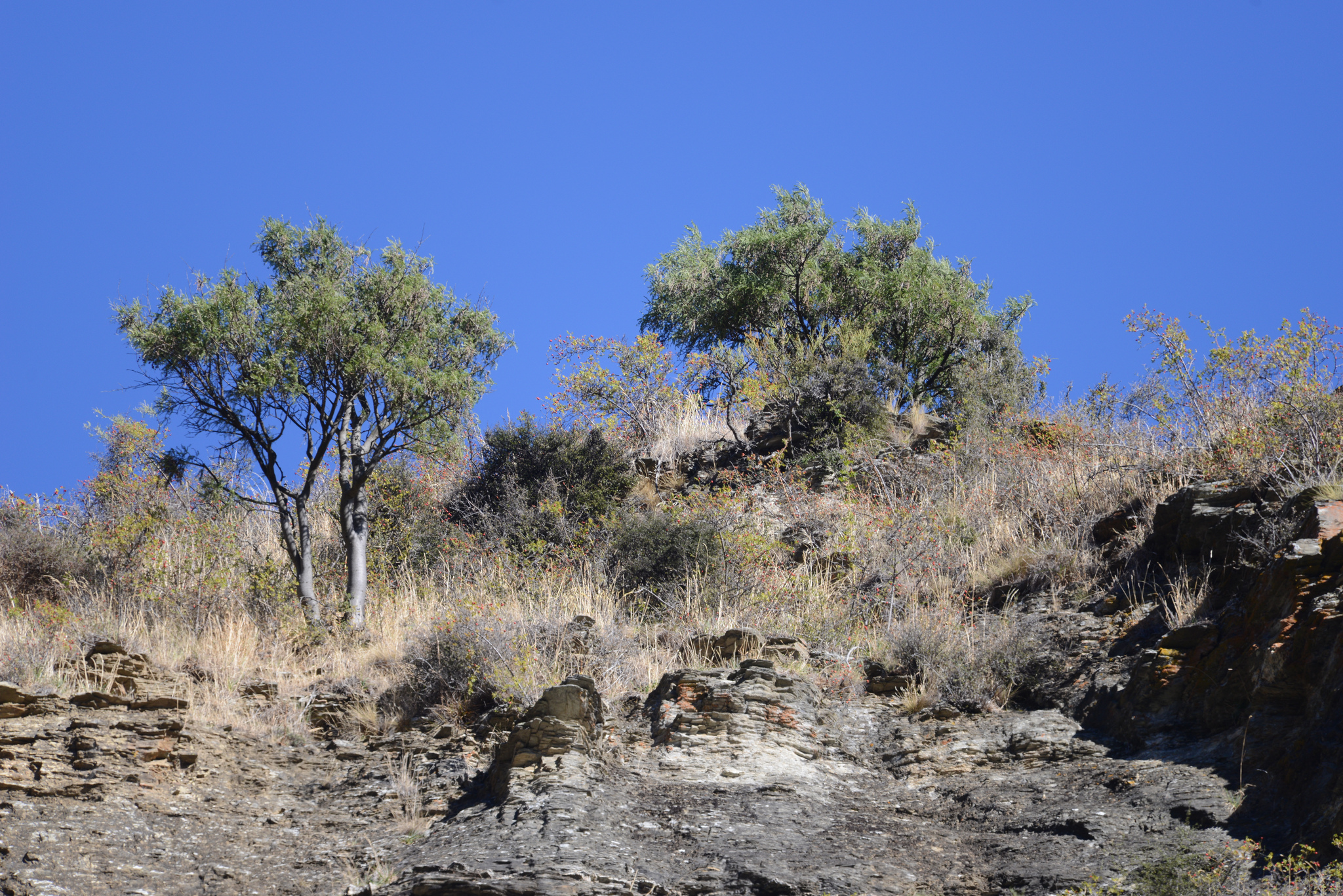
S. microphylla growing on a rocky hillside near Lake Hāwea

Sophora microphylla is endemic to New Zealand. Its range mainly covers the South Island, but is also present in the North Island. It is somewhat uncommon in some parts of the North Island where it is replaced by other Sophora species. It is not found in the northern parts of Hawke's Bay or East Cape. Observations in the Northland Region and Auckland suggest that S. microphylla mainly grows inland there and may have been replaced in coastal areas by the coastal kōwhai (S. chathamica). The species also does not naturally occur on Stewart Island. Its conservation status in the New Zealand Threat Classification System was assessed in 2023 as "Not Threatened".

=== Habitat ===
Sophora microphylla is found in various habitats. S. microphylla typically inhabits coastal to lower montane environments, reaching 500–760 m (1,640–2,490 ft) above sea level at maximum elevation. S. microphylla has been described as "fast-growing" and "very wind-resistant". The plant is primarily found on alluvial river terraces, floodplains, lake edges, riparian forests, sand dunes, and hillside slopes where the ground is composed of loose, rocky debris. In such environments, it typically occurs in shrublands or within mixed podocarp and hardwood forests. A light-demanding tree, S. microphylla may be commonly associated with cabbage trees (Cordyline australis), narrow-leaved lacebarks (Hoheria angustifolia), and lancewoods (Pseudopanax sp.).

== Uses ==
The vibrant, yellow, flowers of the New Zealand kōwhai (Sophora sp.) are well-known and are unofficially recognised as the national flowers of New Zealand, having been a common subject of artwork and a national symbol for the country. Despite their potential toxicity, the plants have been used by indigenous Māori people and European settlers for timber, medicine, cultivation, and in other practices. Māori used the durable, hardy timber for a wide range of purposes, including using it in the making of canoe paddles, farming tools, and weapons. Its strength made it suitable for digging sticks and weapons, while its flexibility made it useful for bird snares and eel spears. The timber was also used in building houses and for fencing.

European settlers similarly valued the timber because of its properties. It was commonly used for fence posts. They also used it for railway sleepers, houses, bracing in wharf construction, furniture, cabinetry, decorative woodwork, tool handles, among other uses.

The plant was also used in traditional medicinal practices. The primary medicinal use was the bark being used to create infusions that would treat sore throats. Māori also used the plants to make natural dyes. Sophora in New Zealand is commonly found in places where it may have been cultivated by Māori people and is often associated with pā (fortress) sites.

== Works cited ==
Books

- Clare, Rachel; Cracknell, Tryphena (2026). Aotearoa in Bloom. HarperCollins. ISBN 978-1-77554-268-1.
- Crowe, Andrew (2009). Which Native Tree? New Zealand Native Trees: A Simple Guide to their Identification, Ecology and Uses. Auckland, New Zealand: Penguin Books. ISBN 978-0-14-300899-6.
- Dawson, John; Lucas, Rob (2011). Field Guide to New Zealand's Native Trees. Nelson, New Zealand: Potton & Burton. ISBN 978-1-877517-01-3.
- Gledhill, David (2002). The Names of Plants. Cambridge, United Kingdom: Cambridge University Press. ISBN 978-0521523400.
- Kirk, Thomas (1889). The Forest Flora of New Zealand. Wellington, New Zealand: Government of New Zealand.
- Vennell, Robert (2019). The Meaning of Trees. Auckland, New Zealand: HarperCollins. ISBN 978-1-77554-130-1.
- Wardle, J. (2011). Wardle's Native Plants of New Zealand and Their Story. Bateson Publishing Limited. ISBN 9781877520068.

Journals

- Bowie, Matthew K.; Bowie, Mike H. (2003). "Where does the New Zealand praying mantis, Orthodera novaezealandiae (Colenso) (Mantodea: Mantidae), deposit its oothecae?". New Zealand Entomologist. 26 (1): 3–5. doi:10.1080/00779962.2003.9722103. ISSN 0077-9962.
- Campagnari, Simone; Zamboni, Lorenzo; Barbon, Isabella; Fusina, Francesca; Lugoboni, Fabio (2024). "An example of cytisine overdose with no consequent side-effects: a case report". Journal of Medical Case Reports. 18 (1). doi:10.1186/s13256-024-04938-w. ISSN 1752-1947.
- Heenan, P. B.; De Lange, P. J.; Wilton, A. D. (2001). "Sophora (Fabaceae) in New Zealand: Taxonomy, distribution, and biogeography". New Zealand Journal of Botany. 39 (1): 17–53. doi:10.1080/0028825X.2001.9512715. ISSN 0028-825X.
- McDougal, Owen M.; Heenan, Peter B.; Jaksons, Peter; Sansom, Catherine E.; Smallfield, Bruce M.; Perry, Nigel B.; van Klink, John W. (2015). "Alkaloid variation in New Zealand kōwhai, Sophora species". Phytochemistry. 118: 9–16. doi:10.1016/j.phytochem.2015.07.019.
- McGlone, Matt S.; Dungan, Roger J.; Hall, Graeme M.J.; Allen, Robert B. (2004). "Winter leaf loss in the New Zealand woody flora". New Zealand Journal of Botany. 42 (1): 1–19. doi:10.1080/0028825X.2004.9512887. ISSN 0028-825X.
- Nguyen, Lisa; Bayne, Karen; Altaner, Clemens (2021). "A review of kōwhai (Sophora spp.) and its potential for commercial forestry". New Zealand Journal of Forestry Science. 51. doi:10.33494/nzjfs512021x157x. ISSN 1179-5395.
- Peña, RC; Iturriaga, L; Montenegro, G; Cassels, BK (2000). "Phylogenetic and Biogeographic Aspects of Sophora Sect. Edwardsia (Papilionaceae)". Pacific Science. 54 (2). Pacific Science. ISSN 0030-8870.
- Pole, Mike (2022). "A vanished ecosystem: Sophora microphylla (Kōwhai) dominated forest recorded in mid-late Holocene rock shelters in Central Otago, New Zealand". Palaeontologia Electronica. doi:10.26879/1169.
- Robertson, Alastair W.; Kelly, Dave; Ladley, Jenny J. (2011). "Futile Selfing in the Trees Fuchsia excorticata (Onagraceae) and Sophora microphylla (Fabaceae): Inbreeding Depression over 11 Years". International Journal of Plant Sciences. 172 (2): 191–198. doi:10.1086/657678. ISSN 1058-5893.
- Shepherd, Lara D.; Heenan, Peter B. (2022). "Phylogenomic analyses reveal a history of hybridisation and introgression between Sophora sect. Edwardsia (Fabaceae) species in New Zealand". New Zealand Journal of Botany. 60 (2): 113–133. doi:10.1080/0028825X.2021.1960567. ISSN 0028-825X.
- Sopow, Stephanie L.; Bain, John (2017). "A checklist of New Zealand Cerambycidae (Insecta: Coleoptera), excluding Lamiinae". New Zealand Entomologist. 40 (2): 55–71. Bibcode:2017NZEnt..40...55S. doi:10.1080/00779962.2017.1357423. ISSN 0077-9962.
- Thorsen, Michael J.; Dickinson, Katharine J.M.; Seddon, Philip J. (2009). "Seed dispersal systems in the New Zealand flora". Perspectives in Plant Ecology, Evolution and Systematics. 11 (4): 285–309. doi:10.1016/j.ppees.2009.06.001.
- Wyse, Sarah V.; Perry, George L. W.; O'Connell, Dean M.; Holland, Phillip S.; Wright, Monique J.; Hosted, Catherine L.; Whitelock, Samuel L.; Geary, Ian J.; Maurin, Kévin J. L.; Curran, Timothy J. (2016). "A Quantitative Assessment of Shoot Flammability for 60 Tree and Shrub Species Supports Rankings Based on Expert Opinion". International Journal of Wildland Fire. 25 (4): 466. doi:10.1071/WF15047. hdl:10182/6884. ISSN 1049-8001.

Websites

- De Lange, Peter (2026). "Sophora microphylla". New Zealand Plant Conservation Network. Archived from the original on 1 February 2026.
- "Sophora microphylla Aiton". Plants of the World Online. Archived from the original on 17 January 2026 – via Royal Botanic Gardens, Kew.
- "Sophora L." Plants of the World Online. Archived from the original on 9 February 2026 – via Royal Botanic Gardens, Kew.
- "Ngā Rauropi Whakaoranga — Sophora spp. Kōwhai". Manaaki Whenua – Landcare Research. 2023. Archived from the original on 3 February 2025.
