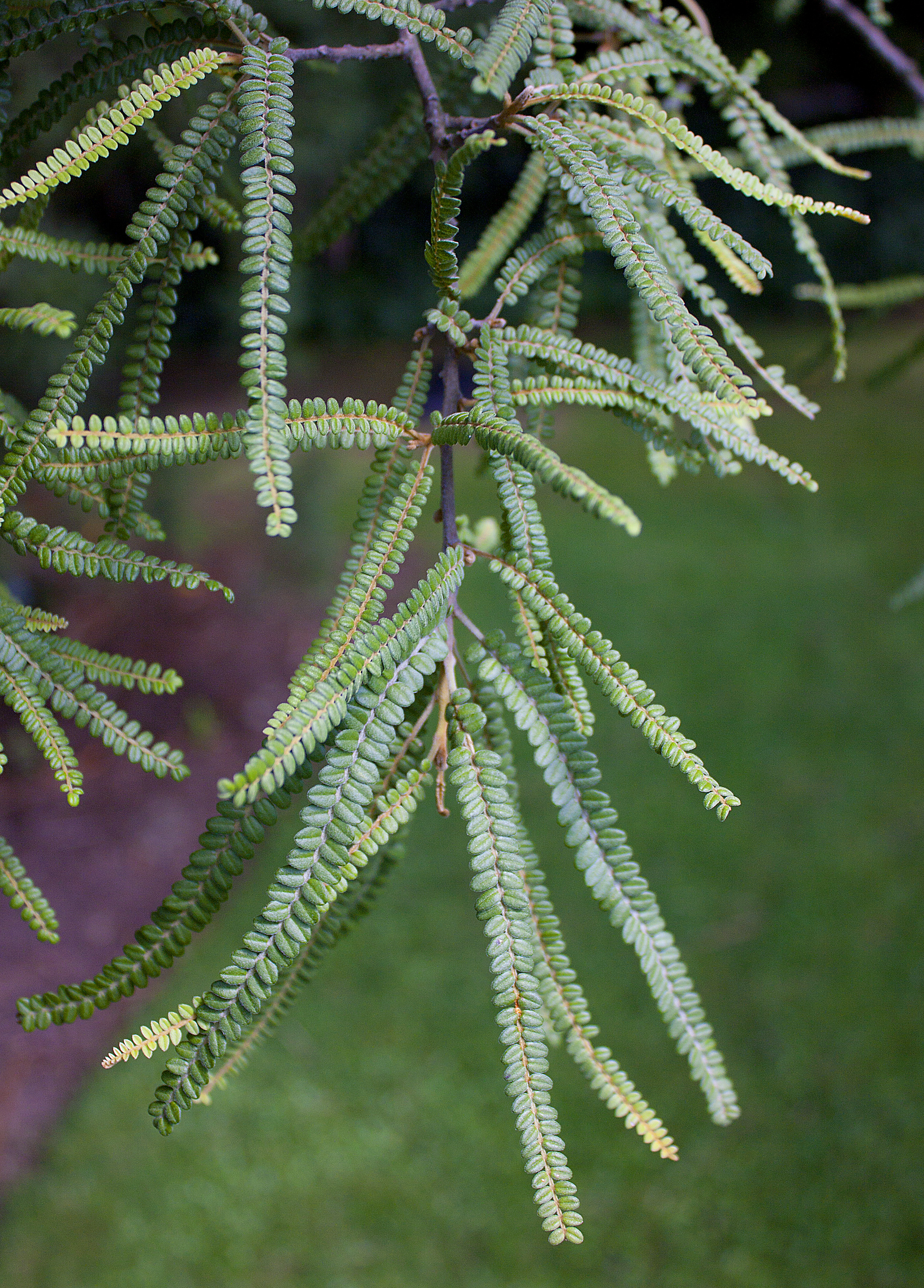
- Sophora fulvida leaves

Conservation status
- Naturally Uncommon (NZ TCS)

Scientific classification
- Kingdom: Plantae
- Clade: Tracheophytes
- Clade: Angiosperms
- Clade: Eudicots
- Clade: Rosids
- Order: Fabales
- Family: Fabaceae
- Subfamily: Faboideae
- Genus: Sophora
- Species: S. fulvida

Binomial name
- Sophora fulvida Heenan & de Lange

= Sophora fulvida =

Species of plant

Sophora fulvida, the kōwhai or west coast kōwhai is one of 8 species of native Sophora or kōwhai in New Zealand and grows naturally around the Northland, Auckland and Waikato regions of New Zealand.

Under the New Zealand Threat Classification System, it is classified as "At Risk - Naturally Uncommon", because of its restricted range.

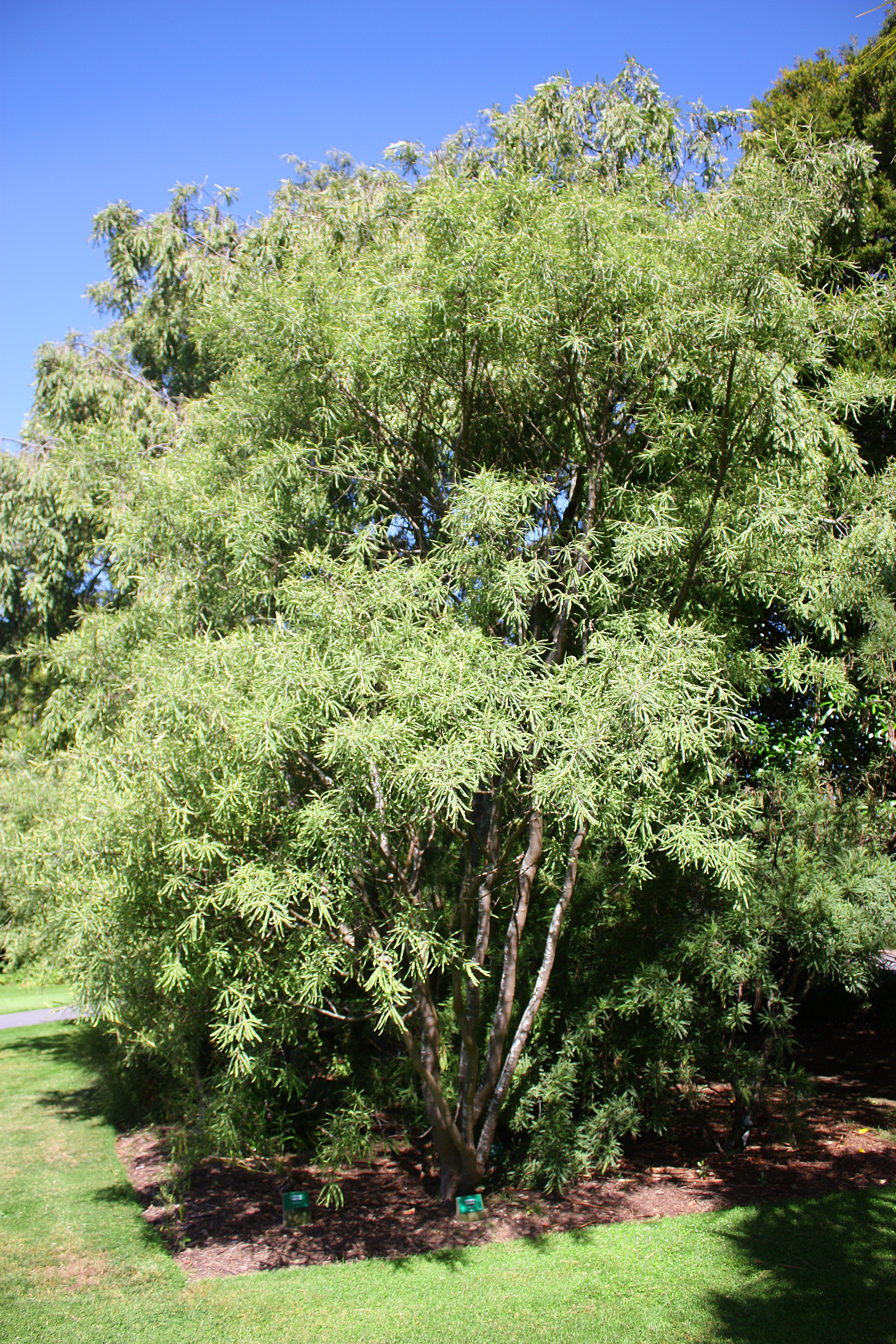
Sophora fulvida tree

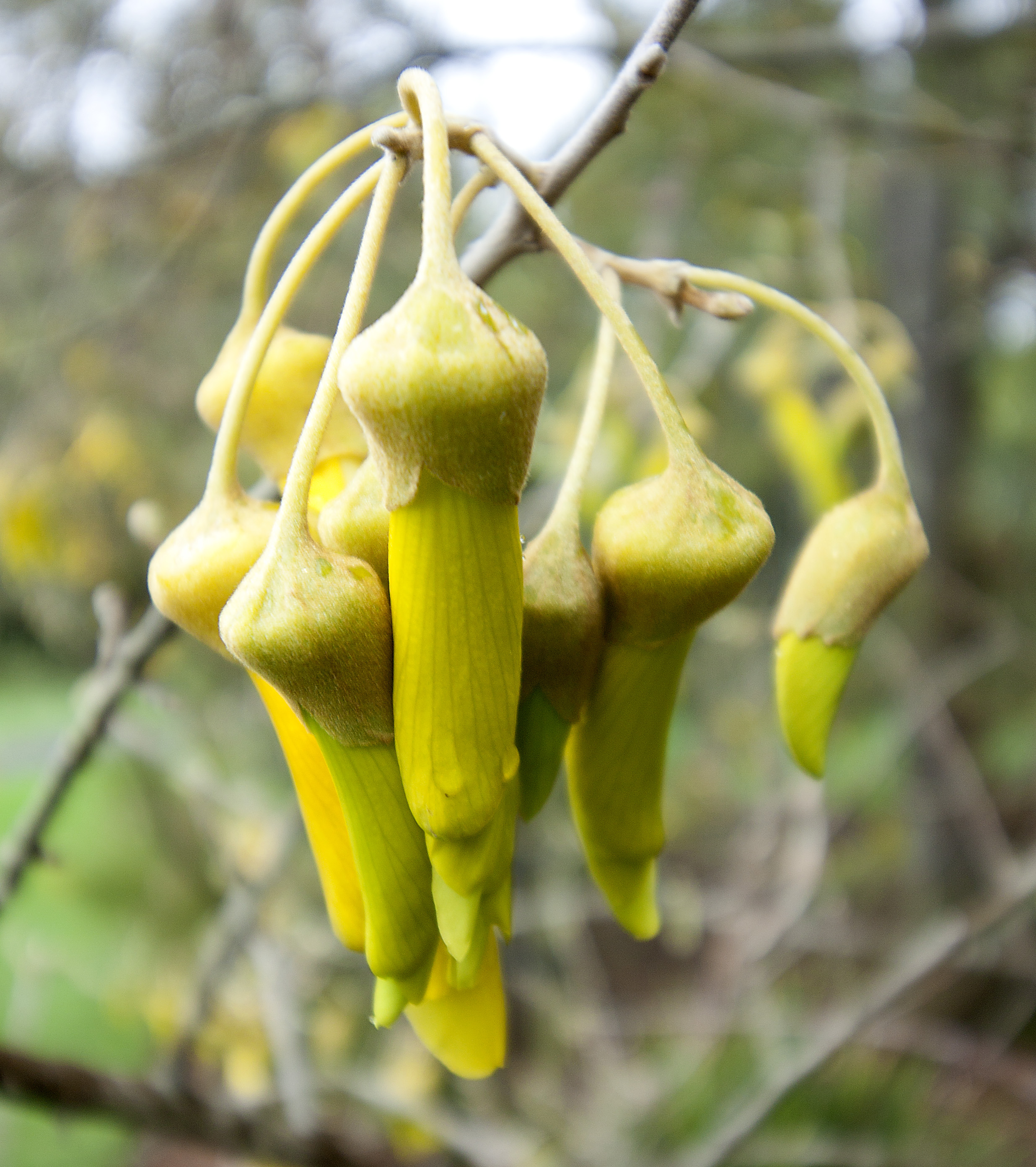
Sophora fulvida kōwhai flowers
