= Divaricate =

Term used for a branching pattern

Divaricate means branching, or having separation or a degree of separation. The angle between branches of divaricating plants is wide.

== In botany ==
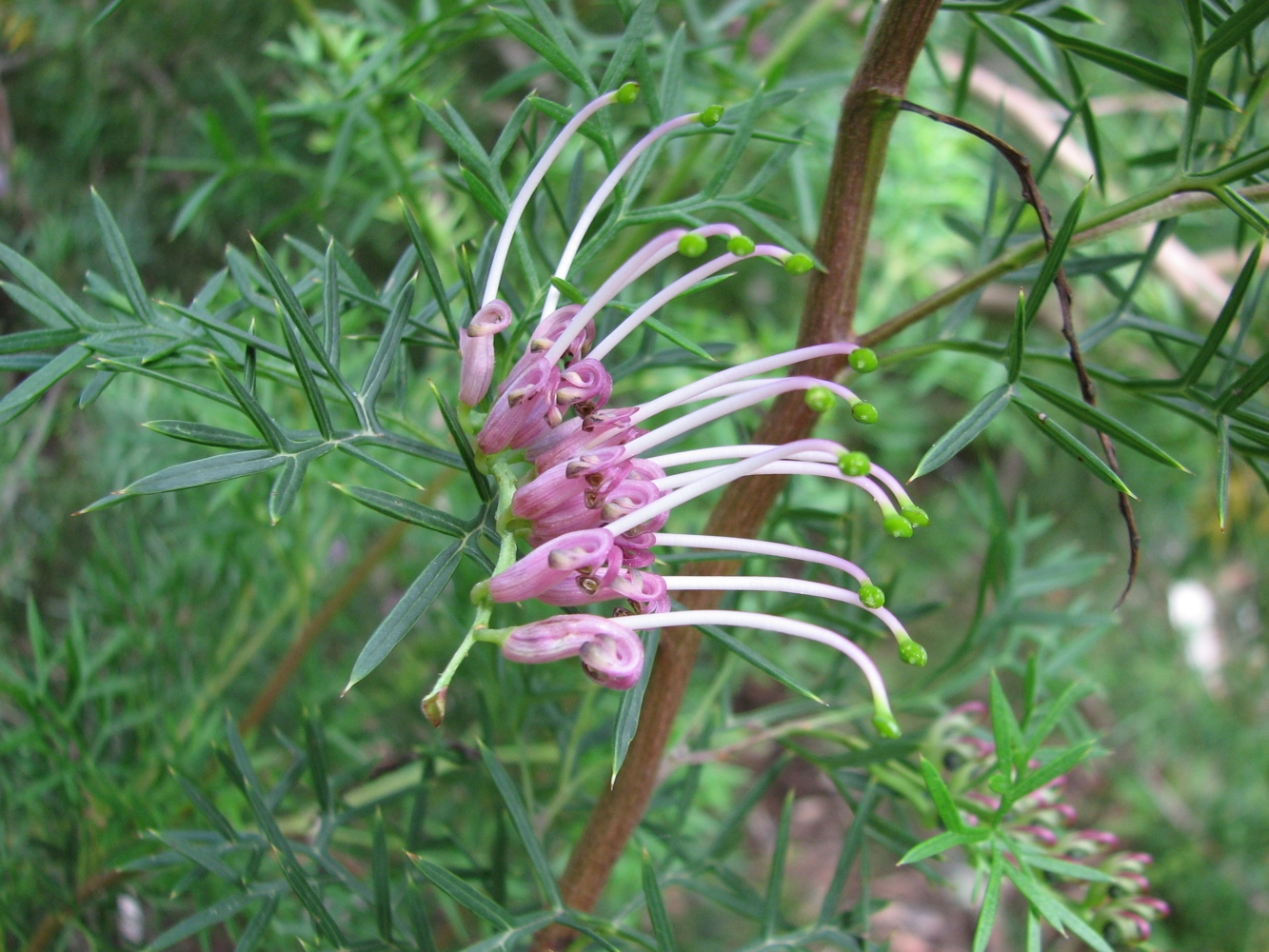
The leaf lobes of Grevillea rivularis are described as divaricate.

In botany, the term is often used to describe the branching pattern of plants. Plants are said to be divaricating when their growth form is such that each internode diverges widely from the previous internode, producing an often tightly interlaced shrub or small tree. Of the 72 small leaved shrubs found on the Banks Peninsula, for example, some 38 are divaricating.

== See also ==
- Diastasis (pathology), a medical term for separation of parts
- Laciniate
