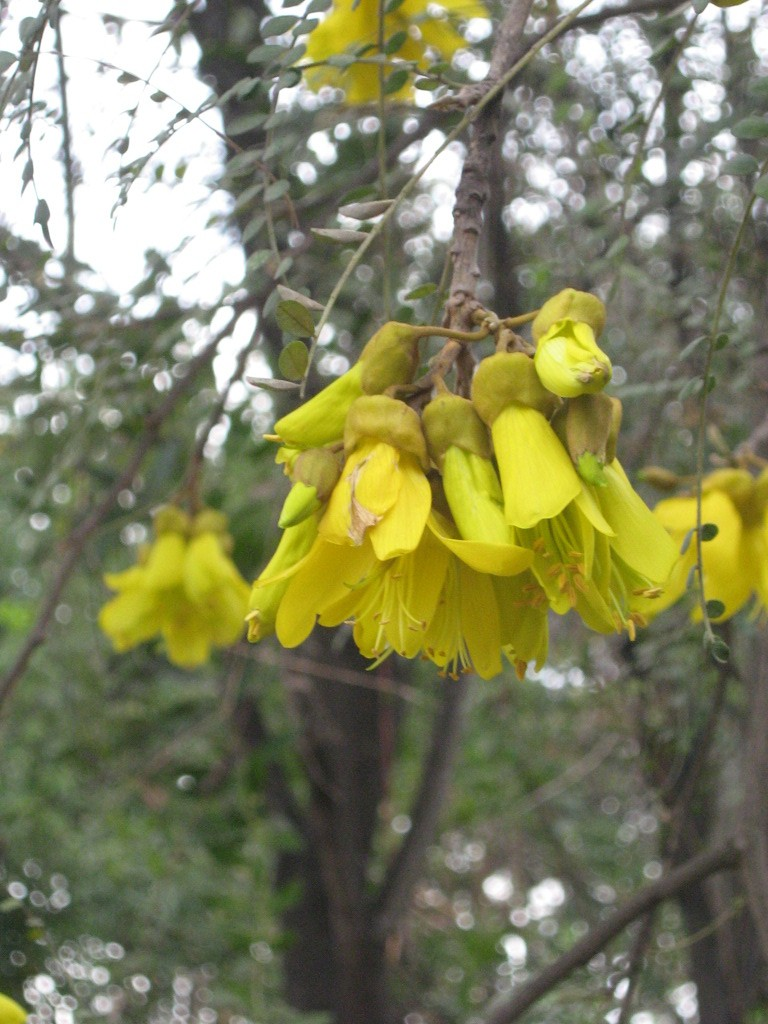

Conservation status
- Near Threatened (IUCN 3.1)

Scientific classification
- Kingdom: Plantae
- Clade: Tracheophytes
- Clade: Angiosperms
- Clade: Eudicots
- Clade: Rosids
- Order: Fabales
- Family: Fabaceae
- Subfamily: Faboideae
- Genus: Sophora
- Species: S. cassioides

Binomial name
- Sophora cassioides (Phil.) Sparre

Synonyms
- Edwardsia macnabiana Graham; Edwardsia cassioides F.Phil.; Sophora macnabiana (Grah.) Skottsb.; Sophora microphylla subsp. macnabiana (Graham) Yakovlev; Sophora tetraptera sensu Reiche

= Sophora cassioides =

Species of legume

Sophora cassioides is a legume tree endemic to central and southern Chile. It is one of the two species of Sophora endemic to continental Chile along with Sophora macrocarpa (other species are endemic to insular Chile).

== Distribution ==
It is an endemic from South Chile and Gough Island. In South America it is found between Constitución and Puyuhuapi. It prefers shady places in Myrtaceae stands, alongside Drimys, Caldcluvia, and other hygrophyllous species. Putative hybrids with Sophora macrocarpa have been described at Bullileo (Linares). It is also found in coastal areas associated with the Peumus boldus–Persea lingue alliance.

== Phylogeny ==
Sophora represents a polyphyletic assemblage. Series Tetrapterae (sensu Tsoong & Ma), including Sophora cassioides and Sophora macrocarpa, forms a monophyletic group with Eurasian species like as Sophora flavescens Ait. and Asian Sophora alopecuroides L., suggesting a west or northwest Pacific origin. The genus Sophora is estimated to have arrived in New Zealand 9.6–8.9 million years ago (in the Neogene).
