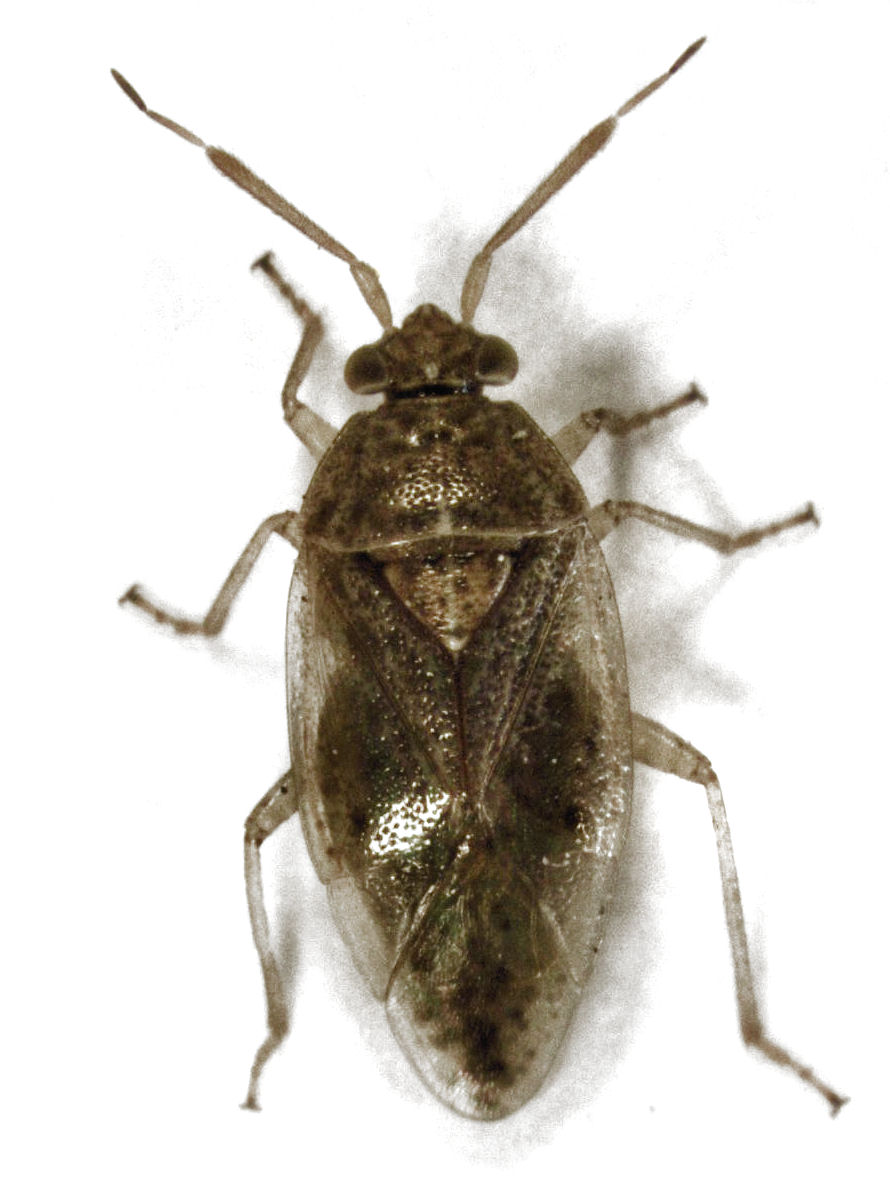

Scientific classification
- Kingdom: Animalia
- Phylum: Arthropoda
- Clade: Pancrustacea
- Class: Insecta
- Order: Hemiptera
- Suborder: Heteroptera
- Family: Miridae
- Genus: Romna
- Species: R. pallida

Binomial name
- Romna pallida Eyles & Carvalho, 1988

= Romna pallida =

Species of true bug

Romna pallida is a species of plant bug. It is endemic to New Zealand. It has been found in both the North Island and the South Island. It is found on plants of the genus Sophora.
