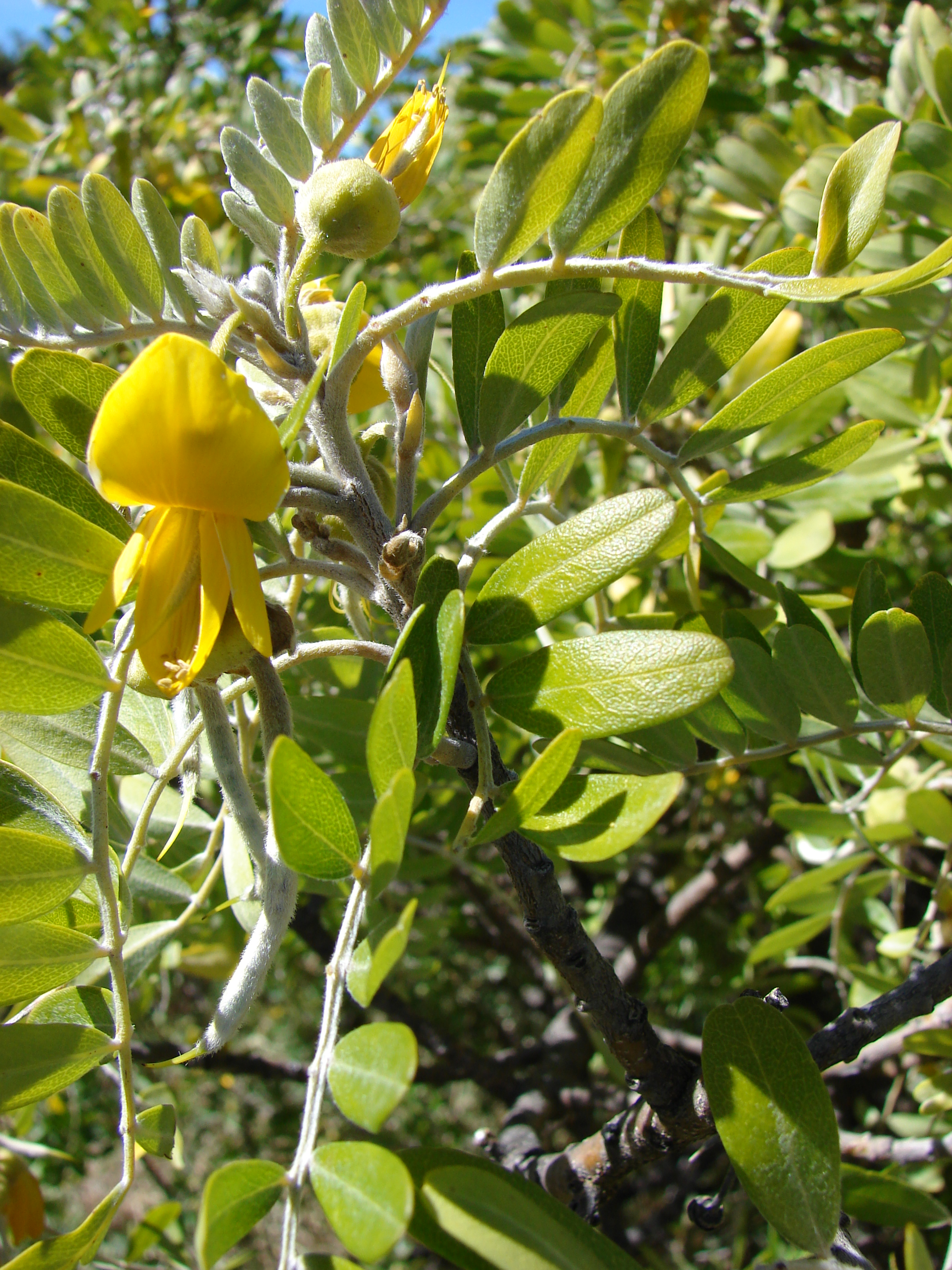
- Sophora chrysophylla flowers and leaves

Scientific classification
- Kingdom: Plantae
- Clade: Embryophytes
- Clade: Tracheophytes
- Clade: Spermatophytes
- Clade: Angiosperms
- Clade: Eudicots
- Clade: Rosids
- Order: Fabales
- Family: Fabaceae
- Subfamily: Faboideae
- Tribe: Sophoreae
- Genus: Sophora; L. (1753)

Type species
- Sophora tomentosa L.

Species
- 59–116; see text

Synonyms
- Ammothamnus Bunge (1847); Cephalostigmaton (Yakovlev) Yakovlev (1967); Echinosophora Nakai (1923); Edwardsia Salisb. (1808); Edwarsia Dumort. (1829), orth. var.; Goebelia Bunge ex Boiss. (1872); Keyserlingia Bunge ex Boiss. (1872); Patrinia Raf. (1819), nom. illeg.; Pseudosophora (DC.) Sweet (1830), nom. superfl.; Radiusia Rchb. (1828); Vexibia Raf. (1825); Vibexia Raf. (1832); Zanthyrsis Raf. (1838)

= Sophora =

Genus of plants

Sophora is a genus of about 45 species of small trees and shrubs in the pea family Fabaceae. The species have a pantropical distribution. The generic name is derived from sophera, an Arabic name for a pea-flowered tree.

The genus formerly had a broader interpretation including many other species now treated in other genera, notably Styphnolobium (pagoda tree genus), which differs in lacking nitrogen fixing bacteria (rhizobia) on the roots, and Dermatophyllum (the mescalbeans). Styphnolobium has galactomannans as seed polysaccharide reserve, in contrast Sophora contains arabinogalactans, and Dermatophyllum amylose.

The New Zealand Sophora species are known as kōwhai.

The seeds of species such as Sophora affinis and Sophora chrysophylla are reported to be poisonous.

== Fossil record ==
One Sophora fossil seed pod from the middle Eocene epoch has been described from the Miller clay pit in Henry County, Tennessee, United States.

== Species ==
Sophora comprises the following species:

- Sophora albescens (Rehder) C.Y. Ma
- Sophora albopetiolulata Léonard
- Sophora alopecuroides L.—sophora root
  - var. alopecuroides
  - var. tomentosa (Boiss.) Bornm.
- Sophora bakeri Prain
- Sophora benthamii Steenis
- Sophora brachygyna C.Y. Ma
- Sophora cassioides (Phil.) Sparre—Pelú (Chile)
- Sophora chathamica Cockayne—coastal kowhai (New Zealand)
- Sophora chrysophylla (Salisb.) Seem.—Māmane (Hawaii)
- Sophora davidi (Franch.) Skeels
- Sophora denudata Bory
- Sophora dunii Craib
- Sophora exigua Craib
- Sophora fernandeziana (Phil.) Skottsb. (Juan Fernández Islands)
  - var. fernandeziana (Phil.) Skottsb.
  - var. reedeana (R.A.Phillips) Skottsb.
- Sophora flavescens Aiton—ku shen (Eastern Asia)
  - var. flavescens Aiton
  - var. galegoides (Pall.) DC.
  - var. kronei (Hance) C.Y.Ma
- Sophora franchetiana Dunn
- Sophora fraseri Benth.
- Sophora fulvida (Allan) Heenan & de Lange—Waitakere kowhai (New Zealand)
- Sophora gibbosa (DC.) Yakovlev
- Sophora godleyi—Godley kowhai, papa kowhai (New Zealand)
- Sophora howinsula (W.R.B.Oliv.) P.S.Green —lignum vitae, Lord Howe kowhai
- Sophora huamotensis Mattapha, Suddee & Rueangr.
- Sophora inhambanensis Klotzsch
- Sophora interrupta Bedd.
- Sophora jaubertii Spach
- Sophora koreensis Nakai – Korean necklace pod
- Sophora leachiana M. Peck
- Sophora linearifolia Griseb.
- Sophora longicarinata (G.Simpson) Allan—limestone kowhai (New Zealand)
- Sophora longipes Merr.
- Sophora macnabiana (Graham) Skottsb.
- Sophora macrocarpa Sm. — mayo or mayú (Chile)
- Sophora mangarevaensis H.St.John (French Polynesia)
- Sophora masafuerana (Phil.) Skottsb. (Juan Fernández Islands)
- Sophora microcarpa C.Y. Ma
- Sophora microphylla Aiton—small-leaved kowhai (New Zealand)
- Sophora mollis (Royle) Baker
  - subsp. griffithii (Stocks) Ali
  - subsp. mollis (Royle) Baker
- Sophora molloyi—Cook Strait Kowhai (New Zealand)
- Sophora moorcroftiana (Benth.) Benth. ex Baker
- Sophora nuttalliana B.L. Turner
- Sophora oblongata P.C.Tsoong
- Sophora pachycarpa Schrenk ex C.A.Mey.
- Sophora praetorulosa Chun & T. Chen
- Sophora prostrata Buchanan—dwarf kowhai, prostrate kowhai (New Zealand)
- Sophora raivavaeensis H.St.John (French Polynesia)
- Sophora rapaensis H.St.John (French Polynesia)
- Sophora reedeana (Phil.) Yakovlev
- Sophora rhynchocarpa Griseb. (unplaced)
- Sophora saxicola Proctor (Jamaica)
- Sophora secundiflora, a popular landscape plant, was reclassified to Dermatophyllum secundiflorum.
- Sophora songarica Schrenk
- Sophora stenophylla A. Gray
- Sophora tetraptera J.F. Mill.—large-leaved kowhai, Taupo kowhai (New Zealand)
- Sophora tomentosa L.—necklace pod (Pantropical on coasts)
  - subsp. littoralis (Schrad.) Yakovlev
  - subsp. occidentalis (L.) Brummitt
  - subsp. tomentosa L.
- Sophora tonkinensis Gagnep.
- Sophora toromiro Skottsb.—toromiro (Easter Island)
- Sophora velutina Lindl.
  - subsp. cavaleriei (H.Lev.) Brummitt & J.B.Gillett
  - subsp. velutina Lindl.
  - subsp. zimbabweensis J. B. Gillett & Brummitt
- Sophora violacea Thwaites
- Sophora wightii Baker (India)
- Sophora xanthoantha C.Y. Ma
- Sophora yunnanensis C.Y. Ma
- Sophora zeylanica Trimen

== Species names with uncertain taxonomic status ==
The status of the following species is unresolved:

- Sophora angustifolia Q.Q.Liu & H.Y.Ye
- Sophora biflora Houtt.
- Sophora biflora Retz.
- Sophora buxifolia Retz.
- Sophora chathamica Cockayne
- Sophora coerulea Moench
- Sophora cuneifolia Steud.
- Sophora davidii (Franch.) Skeels
- Sophora donihuensis Ravenna
- Sophora genistaefolia Salisb.
- Sophora genistoides L.
- Sophora glabra Moench
- Sophora glabra Hassk.
- Sophora godleyi Heenan & de Lange
- Sophora grandiflora (Salisb.) Skottsb.
- Sophora grisea O.Deg. & Sherff
- Sophora hirsuta Aiton
- Sophora houghiana Wall.
- Sophora howinsula (W.R.B. Oliv.) P. Green
- Sophora jabandas Montrouz.
- Sophora juncea Schrad.
- Sophora ludovice-Adecim-Asexta Buc'hoz
- Sophora mangarevaensis H.St.John
- Sophora mecosperma J.St.-Hil.
- Sophora molloyi Heenan & de Lange
- Sophora molokaiensis O. Degener & I. Degener
- Sophora mutabilis Salisb.
- Sophora myrtillifolia Retz.
- Sophora oblongata P.C.Tsoong
- Sophora oblongifolia Ruiz & Pav.
- Sophora oligophylla Baker
- Sophora pendula Spach
- Sophora pentaphylla Desv.
- Sophora persica (Boiss. & Buhse) Rech.f.
- Sophora praetorulosa Chun & T.C. Chen
- Sophora raivavaeensis H.St.John
- Sophora rapaensis H.St.John
- Sophora robinoides Walp.
- Sophora senegalensis Deless. ex DC.
- Sophora sibirica Holub
- Sophora sinica Rosier
- Sophora sinuata Larrañaga
- Sophora sororia Hance
- Sophora sumatrana Yakovlev
- Sophora sylvatica Burch.
- Sophora tetraptera J. Miller
- Sophora tiloebsis Blume ex Miq.
- Sophora tiloensis Blume ex Miq.
- Sophora trifolia Steud.
- Sophora triphylla Sweet
- Sophora vanioti H. Lév.
- Sophora vestita Nakai
- Sophora viciifolis Hance
