= Agnippe kuznetzovi =

Scientific classification
- Kingdom: Animalia
- Phylum: Arthropoda
- Clade: Pancrustacea
- Class: Insecta
- Order: Lepidoptera
- Family: Gelechiidae
- Genus: Agnippe
- Species: A. kuznetzovi

Binomial name
- Agnippe kuznetzovi (Lvovsky & Piskunov, 1989)

Synonyms
- Evippe kuznetzovi Lvovsky & Piskunov, 1989; Evippe zhengi Wang & Li, 1994; Agnippe zhengi

Species of moth

Agnippe kuznetzovi is a moth of the family Gelechiidae. It is found in south-eastern Kazakhstan, Mongolia and China (Hebei, Ningxia).

The wingspan is 8.5–10 millimetres (0.33–0.39 in).

The larvae feed on the leaves of Sophora alopecuroides.
