= Agnippe leuconota =

Scientific classification
- Kingdom: Animalia
- Phylum: Arthropoda
- Clade: Pancrustacea
- Class: Insecta
- Order: Lepidoptera
- Family: Gelechiidae
- Genus: Agnippe
- Species: A. leuconota

Binomial name
- Agnippe leuconota (Zeller, 1873)

Synonyms
- Gelechia (Teliea) leuconota Zeller, 1873; Phaetusa plutella Chambers, 1875; Evippe leuconota Zeller, 1873

Species of moth

Agnippe leuconota is a moth in the family Gelechiidae. It is found in North America, where it has been recorded from Illinois, Maine, Florida, Texas and Mexico.

Adults are similar to Agnippe prunifoliella, but that species has a small white spot on the base of the costa of the forewings, a distinct white costal spot just before the cilia, and a white streak in the apex, all of which are absent in leuconota. In prunifoliella, the white of the dorsal margin sends three large almost triangular projections into the brown, but in this species there are three scarcely perceptible emarginations only. Adults are on wing from May to August.
