= Necklacepod =

Necklacepod is a common name for several plants and may refer to:

- Sophora tomentosa
- Styphnolobium
