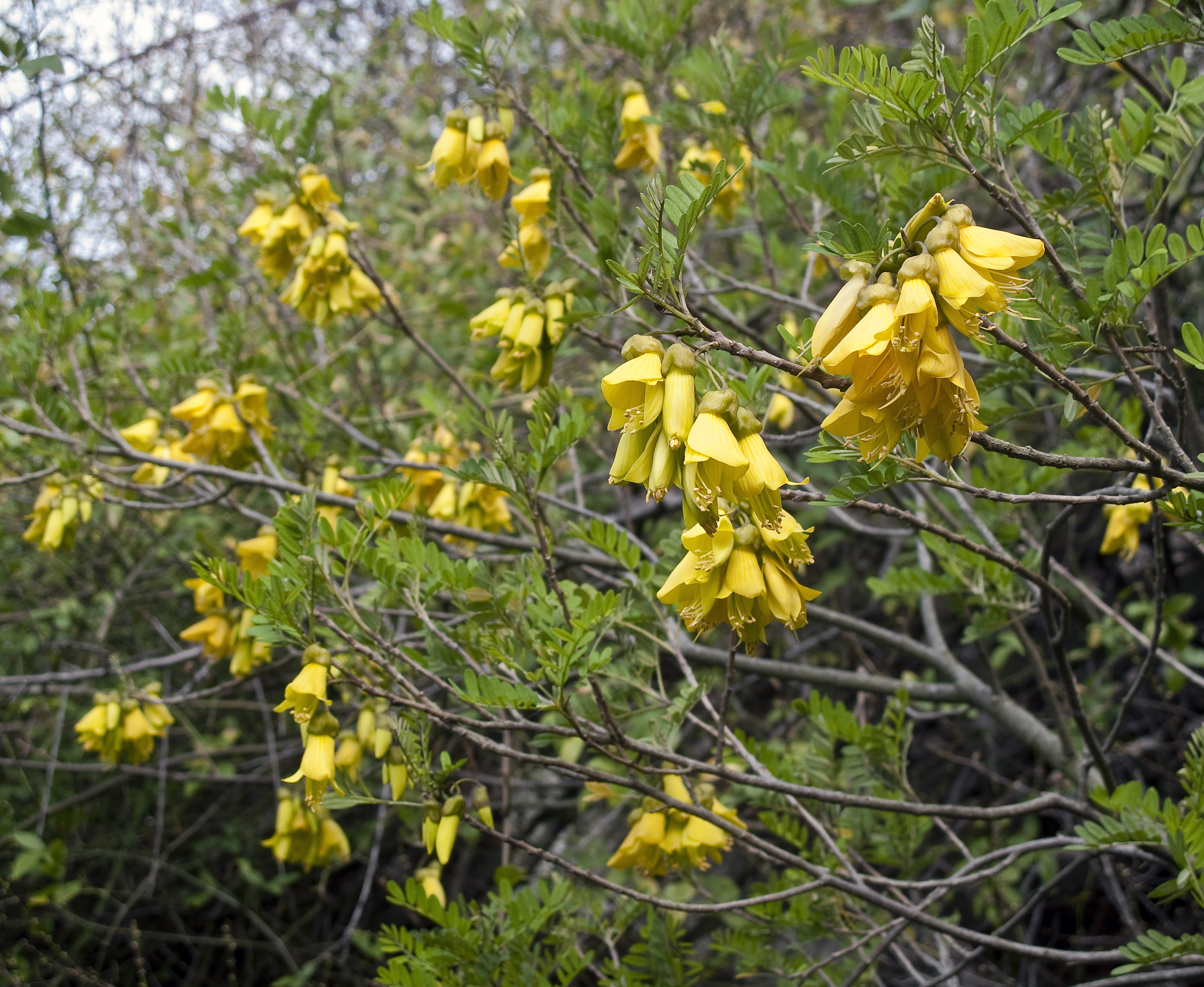

Scientific classification
- Kingdom: Plantae
- Clade: Tracheophytes
- Clade: Angiosperms
- Clade: Eudicots
- Clade: Rosids
- Order: Fabales
- Family: Fabaceae
- Subfamily: Faboideae
- Genus: Sophora
- Species: S. howinsula

Binomial name
- Sophora howinsula (W.R.B.Oliv.) P.S.Green (1970)

Synonyms
- Sophora tetraptera var. howinsula W.R.B.Oliv. (1917); Sophora tetraptera subsp. howinsula (W.R.B.Oliv.) Yarkovlev (1967)

= Sophora howinsula =

Species of legume

Sophora howinsula, commonly known as lignum vitae or Lord Howe kowhai, is a flowering plant in the legume family. The specific epithet refers to the island to which the species is endemic.

== Description ==
It is a tree, growing to 10 m, sometimes 15 m, in height. The wood is hard and durable and was used for house stumps and fence posts. The pinnate leaves are 5–10 cm long. The 1.5–2 cm long yellow pea flowers are produced in racemose inflorescences. The 7–12 cm long pods each contain 5–10 smooth, orange-brown, ellipsoidal, 7 mm long seeds. The flowering season is from mid-July to mid-September.

== Distribution and habitat ==
The plant is endemic to Australia’s subtropical Lord Howe Island in the Tasman Sea. It has a locally common, scattered distribution through the island's lowland hills.
