= Agnippe separatella =

Scientific classification
- Domain: Eukaryota
- Kingdom: Animalia
- Phylum: Arthropoda
- Class: Insecta
- Order: Lepidoptera
- Family: Gelechiidae
- Genus: Agnippe
- Species: A. separatella

Binomial name
- Agnippe separatella Bidzilya & H.H. Li, 2010

Species of moth

Agnippe separatella is a moth of the family Gelechiidae. It is found in southern Iran.
