= Agnippe zhouzhiensis =

Scientific classification
- Domain: Eukaryota
- Kingdom: Animalia
- Phylum: Arthropoda
- Class: Insecta
- Order: Lepidoptera
- Family: Gelechiidae
- Genus: Agnippe
- Species: A. zhouzhiensis

Binomial name
- Agnippe zhouzhiensis (Li, 1993)

Synonyms
- Evippe zhouzhiensis Li, 1993

Species of moth

Agnippe zhouzhiensis is a moth of the family Gelechiidae. It is found in China (Shaanxi) and Russia (Primorsky Region).

The wingspan is 9–10.1 mm. Adults are on wing from July to August.
