= Agnippe turanica =

Scientific classification
- Domain: Eukaryota
- Kingdom: Animalia
- Phylum: Arthropoda
- Class: Insecta
- Order: Lepidoptera
- Family: Gelechiidae
- Genus: Agnippe
- Species: A. turanica

Binomial name
- Agnippe turanica Bidzilya & H.H. Li, 2010

Species of moth

Agnippe turanica is a moth of the family Gelechiidae. It is found in Uzbekistan and south-eastern Kazakhstan.

The wingspan is 9.5–10.5 mm. Adults are on wing from late May to early June.
