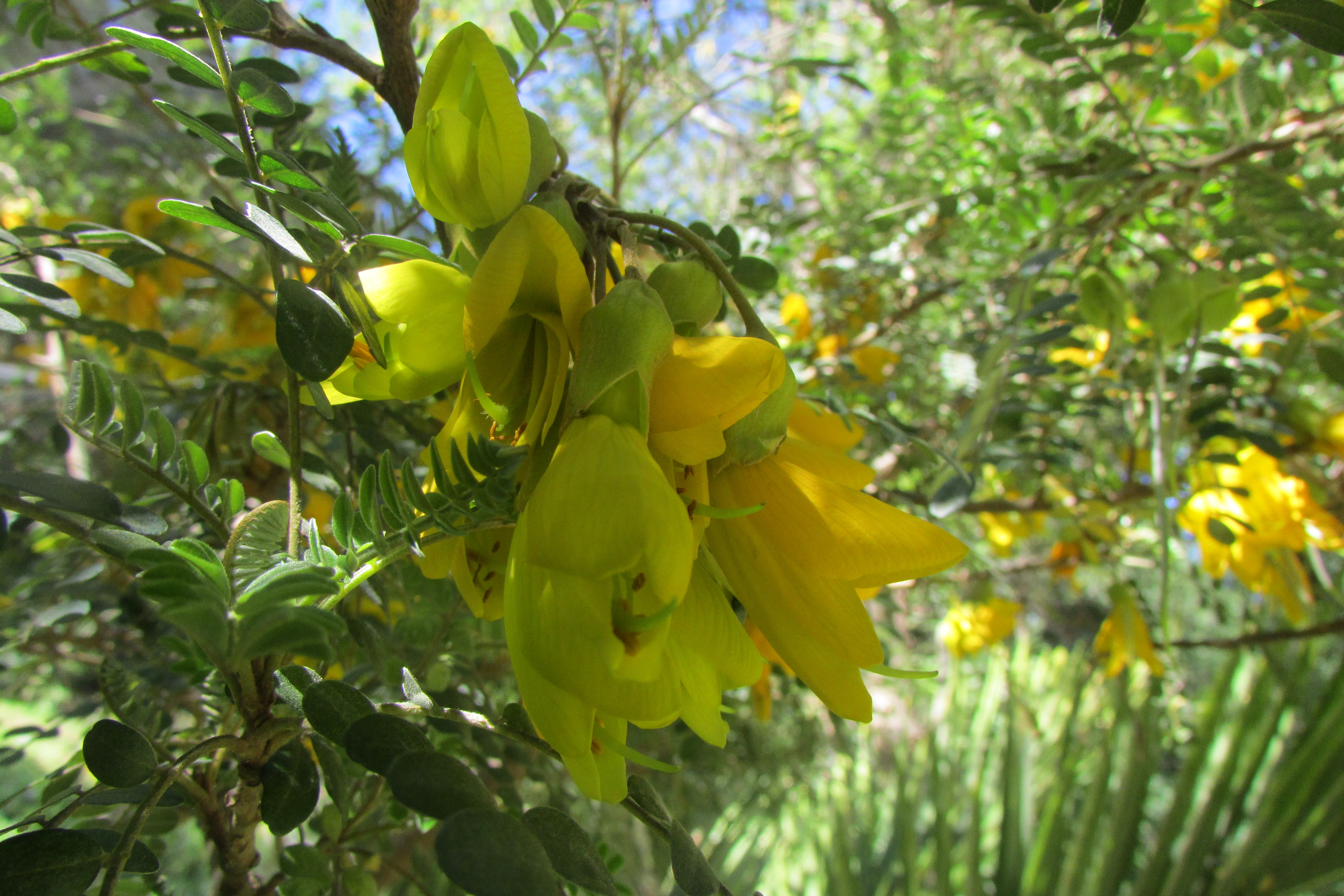
- Sophora masafuerana flowers

Conservation status
- Vulnerable (IUCN 2.3)

Scientific classification
- Kingdom: Plantae
- Clade: Tracheophytes
- Clade: Angiosperms
- Clade: Eudicots
- Clade: Rosids
- Order: Fabales
- Family: Fabaceae
- Subfamily: Faboideae
- Genus: Sophora
- Species: S. masafuerana

Binomial name
- Sophora masafuerana (Phil.) Skottsb.

= Sophora masafuerana =

Species of legume

Sophora masafuerana is a species of flowering plant in the family Fabaceae, that is endemic to the Juan Fernández Islands of Chile. It is threatened by habitat loss.
