= Agnippe conjugella =

Scientific classification
- Domain: Eukaryota
- Kingdom: Animalia
- Phylum: Arthropoda
- Class: Insecta
- Order: Lepidoptera
- Family: Gelechiidae
- Genus: Agnippe
- Species: A. conjugella

Binomial name
- Agnippe conjugella (Caradja, 1920)

Synonyms
- Lita conjugella Caradja, 1920; Stegasta conjugella; Evippe conjugella; Evippe haberlandi Amsel, 1961; Agnippe haberlandi

Species of moth

Agnippe conjugella is a moth of the family Gelechiidae. It is found in Afghanistan, northern Iran, south-eastern Kazakhstan, Uzbekistan, Turkmenistan, Kyrgyzstan and China (Ningxia).

The wingspan is 7.5–8.7 mm.
