= Agnippe crinella =

Scientific classification
- Domain: Eukaryota
- Kingdom: Animalia
- Phylum: Arthropoda
- Class: Insecta
- Order: Lepidoptera
- Family: Gelechiidae
- Genus: Agnippe
- Species: A. crinella

Binomial name
- Agnippe crinella Keifer, 1927

Species of moth

Agnippe crinella is a moth in the family Gelechiidae. It is found in North America, where it has been recorded from California.
