= Agnippe aulonota =

Scientific classification
- Kingdom: Animalia
- Phylum: Arthropoda
- Class: Insecta
- Order: Lepidoptera
- Family: Gelechiidae
- Genus: Agnippe
- Species: A. aulonota

Binomial name
- Agnippe aulonota (Meyrick, 1917)

Synonyms
- Aristotelia aulonota Meyrick, 1917; Evippe aulonota Meyrick, 1917

Species of moth

Agnippe aulonota is a moth in the family Gelechiidae. It is found in Ecuador.

The wingspan is 7–9 mm. The forewings are slightly pale-freckled except on the edge of the dorsal streak and with a rather broad whitish-ochreous streak along the dorsum from the base to beyond the tornus, posteriorly pointed, the upper edge with two or three slight irregular prominences. There is also a small whitish-ochreous spot on costa at three-fourths. The hindwings are light grey, in males with an expansible pencil of long ochreous-whitish hairs from the costa near the base.
