= Agnippe fuscopulvella =

Scientific classification
- Kingdom: Animalia
- Phylum: Arthropoda
- Clade: Pancrustacea
- Class: Insecta
- Order: Lepidoptera
- Family: Gelechiidae
- Genus: Agnippe
- Species: A. fuscopulvella

Binomial name
- Agnippe fuscopulvella Chambers, 1872

Species of moth

Agnippe fuscopulvella is a moth in the family Gelechiidae. It is found in North America, where it has been recorded from Kentucky.

The forewings are whitish, tinged with yellowish-ochreous, densely dusted with fuscous.
