= Agnippe echinulata =

Scientific classification
- Domain: Eukaryota
- Kingdom: Animalia
- Phylum: Arthropoda
- Class: Insecta
- Order: Lepidoptera
- Family: Gelechiidae
- Genus: Agnippe
- Species: A. echinulata

Binomial name
- Agnippe echinulata (Li, 1993)

Synonyms
- Evippe echinulata Li, 1993

Species of moth

Agnippe echinulata is a moth of the family Gelechiidae. It is found in China (Shaanxi, Shanxi).

The wingspan is 8–9 mm. Adults are on wing from the end of June to August.
