= Agnippe dichotoma =

Scientific classification
- Domain: Eukaryota
- Kingdom: Animalia
- Phylum: Arthropoda
- Class: Insecta
- Order: Lepidoptera
- Family: Gelechiidae
- Genus: Agnippe
- Species: A. dichotoma

Binomial name
- Agnippe dichotoma (Li, 1993)

Synonyms
- Evippe dichotoma Li, 1993

Species of moth

Agnippe dichotoma is a moth of the family Gelechiidae. It is found in China (Shaanxi).

The wingspan is 8–9 mm. Adults are on wing at the end of June.
