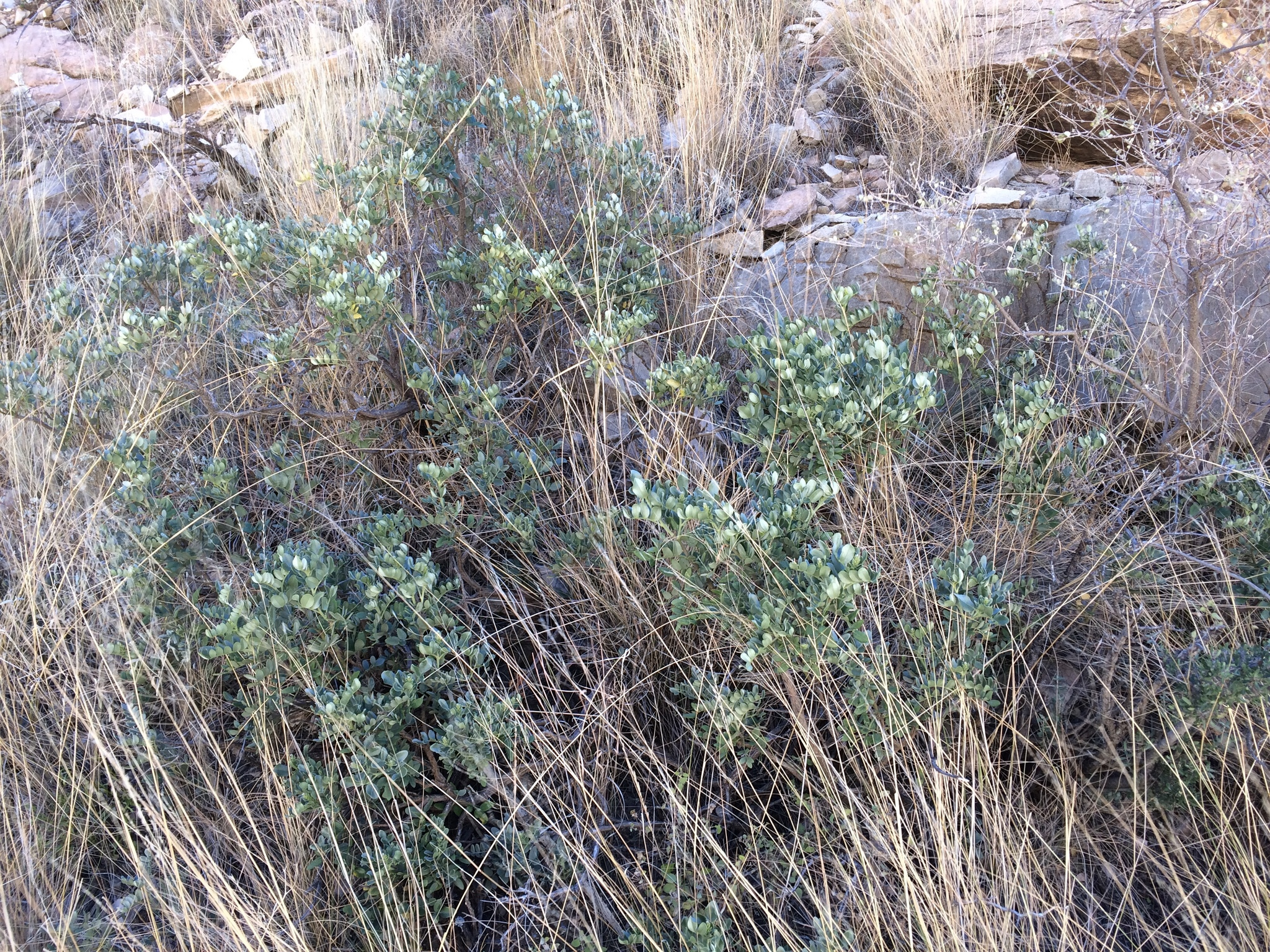

Conservation status
- Critically Imperiled (NatureServe)

Scientific classification
- Kingdom: Plantae
- Clade: Tracheophytes
- Clade: Angiosperms
- Clade: Eudicots
- Clade: Rosids
- Order: Fabales
- Family: Fabaceae
- Subfamily: Faboideae
- Genus: Dermatophyllum
- Species: D. gypsophilum

Binomial name
- Dermatophyllum gypsophilum (B.L. Turner & A.M. Powell) Vincent

Subspecies
- subsp. guadalupense (B.L.Turner & A.M. Powell) Vincent; subsp. gypsophilum (B.L.Turner & A.M. Powell) Vincent

Synonyms
- Calia gypsophila (B.L. Turner & A.M. Powell) Yakovlev; Sophora gypsophila B.L.Turner & A.Powell

= Dermatophyllum gypsophilum =

Species of legume

Dermatophyllum gypsophilum is a rare species of flowering plant in the legume family known by the common names Guadalupe Mountain necklacepod, Guadalupe mescalbean (var. guadalupensis), and gypsum necklace. It is native to New Mexico and Texas in the United States, and it is known from one location in Chihuahua in Mexico.

This shrub grows up to 2 meters in height and has leathery, silver-haired leaves and purple flowers.

There are two subspecies: subsp. gypsophila is native to Chihuahua, where it is found between Coyame and Chihuahua City. The subsp. guadalupensis is found in the Brokeoff and Guadalupe Mountains of New Mexico and in Culberson County, Texas.

This plant often grows in substrates containing gypsum. In the Guadalupe Mountains the soil is fine-grained pink sandstone with some gypsum or limestone pavement with about 1% gypsum. The plant grows alongside Tiquilia hispidissima, which is limited to gypsum soils.
