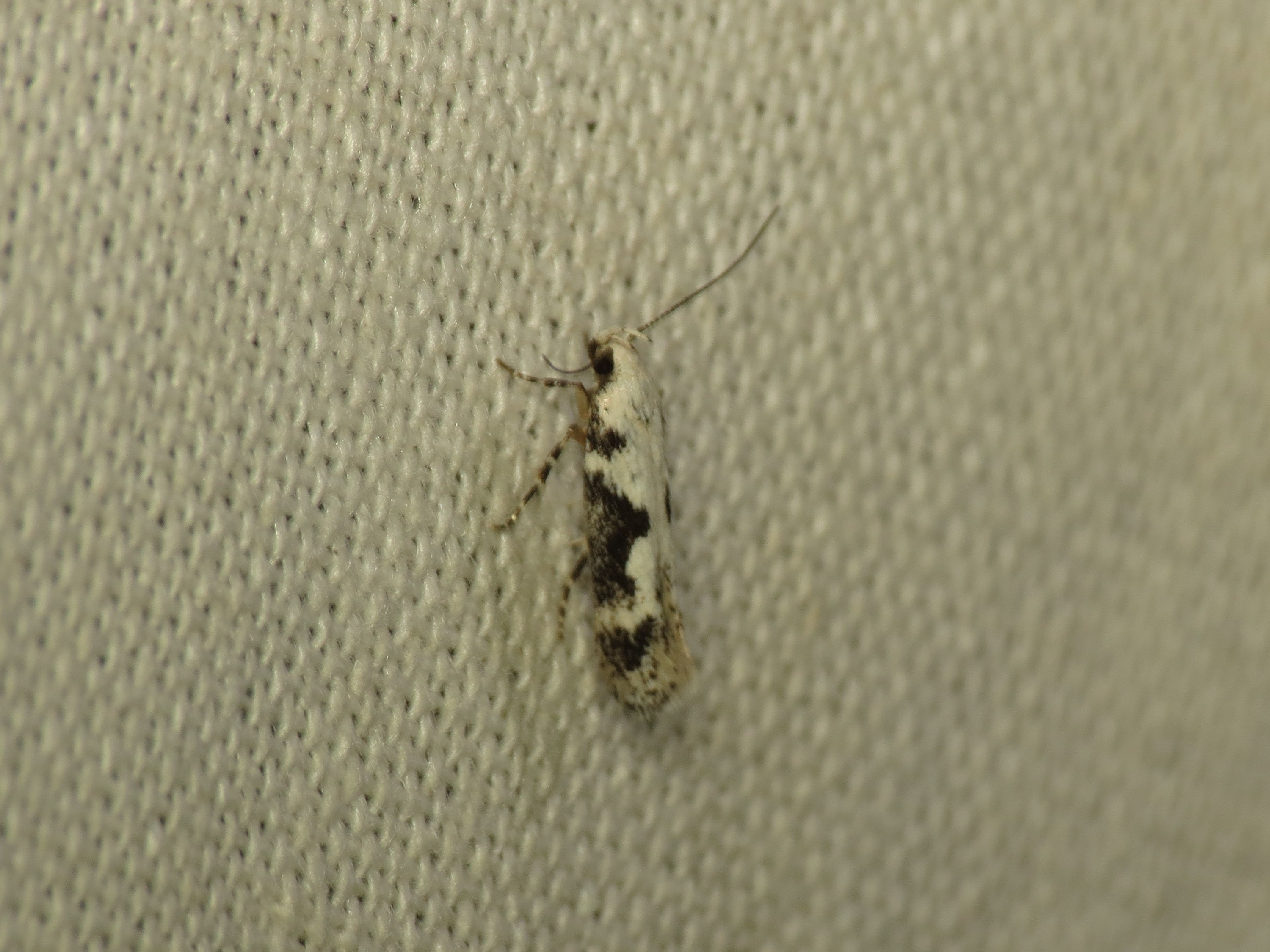
- Agnippe laudatella

Scientific classification
- Kingdom: Animalia
- Phylum: Arthropoda
- Clade: Pancrustacea
- Class: Insecta
- Order: Lepidoptera
- Family: Gelechiidae
- Tribe: Litini
- Genus: Agnippe; Chambers, 1872

Synonyms
- Evippe Chambers, 1873; Aganippe Chambers, 1880 (misspelling); Phaetusa Chambers, 1875 (preocc. Wagler 1832); Tholerostola Meyrick, 1917

= Agnippe =

Genus of moths

Agnippe is a genus of moths in the family Gelechiidae.

== Species ==
- Agnippe abdita (Braun, 1925)
- Agnippe aequorea (Meyrick, 1917)
- Agnippe albidorsella (Snellen, 1884)
- Agnippe aulonota (Meyrick, 1917)
- Agnippe biscolorella Chambers, 1872
- Agnippe conjugella (Caradja, 1920)
- Agnippe crinella Keifer, 1927
- Agnippe deserta Bidzilya & H.H. Li, 2010
- Agnippe dichotoma (Li, 1993)
- Agnippe echinulata (Li, 1993)
- Agnippe echinuloides Bidzilya & H.H. Li, 2010
- Agnippe evippeella Busck, 1906
- Agnippe fuscopulvella Chambers, 1872
- Agnippe kuznetzovi (Lvovsky & Piskunov, 1989)
- Agnippe laudatella (Walsingham, 1907)
- Agnippe leuconota (Zeller, 1873)
- Agnippe lunaki (Rebel, 1941)
- Agnippe miniscula (Li, 1993)
- Agnippe novisyrictis (Li, 1993)
- Agnippe omphalopa (Meyrick, 1917)
- Agnippe prunifoliella (Chambers, 1873)
- Agnippe pseudolella (Christoph, 1888)
- Agnippe separatella Bidzilya & H.H. Li, 2010
- Agnippe syrictis (Meyrick, 1936)
- Agnippe turanica Bidzilya & H.H. Li, 2010
- Agnippe yongdengensis (Li, 1993)
- Agnippe zhouzhiensis (Li, 1993)
