= Agnippe echinuloides =

Scientific classification
- Domain: Eukaryota
- Kingdom: Animalia
- Phylum: Arthropoda
- Class: Insecta
- Order: Lepidoptera
- Family: Gelechiidae
- Genus: Agnippe
- Species: A. echinuloides

Binomial name
- Agnippe echinuloides Bidzilya & H.H. Li, 2010

Species of moth

Agnippe echinuloides is a moth of the family Gelechiidae. It is found in Russia (southern Ural, Tuva, Chita Region) and Mongolia.

The wingspan is 10–11 mm. Adults are on wing in June.
