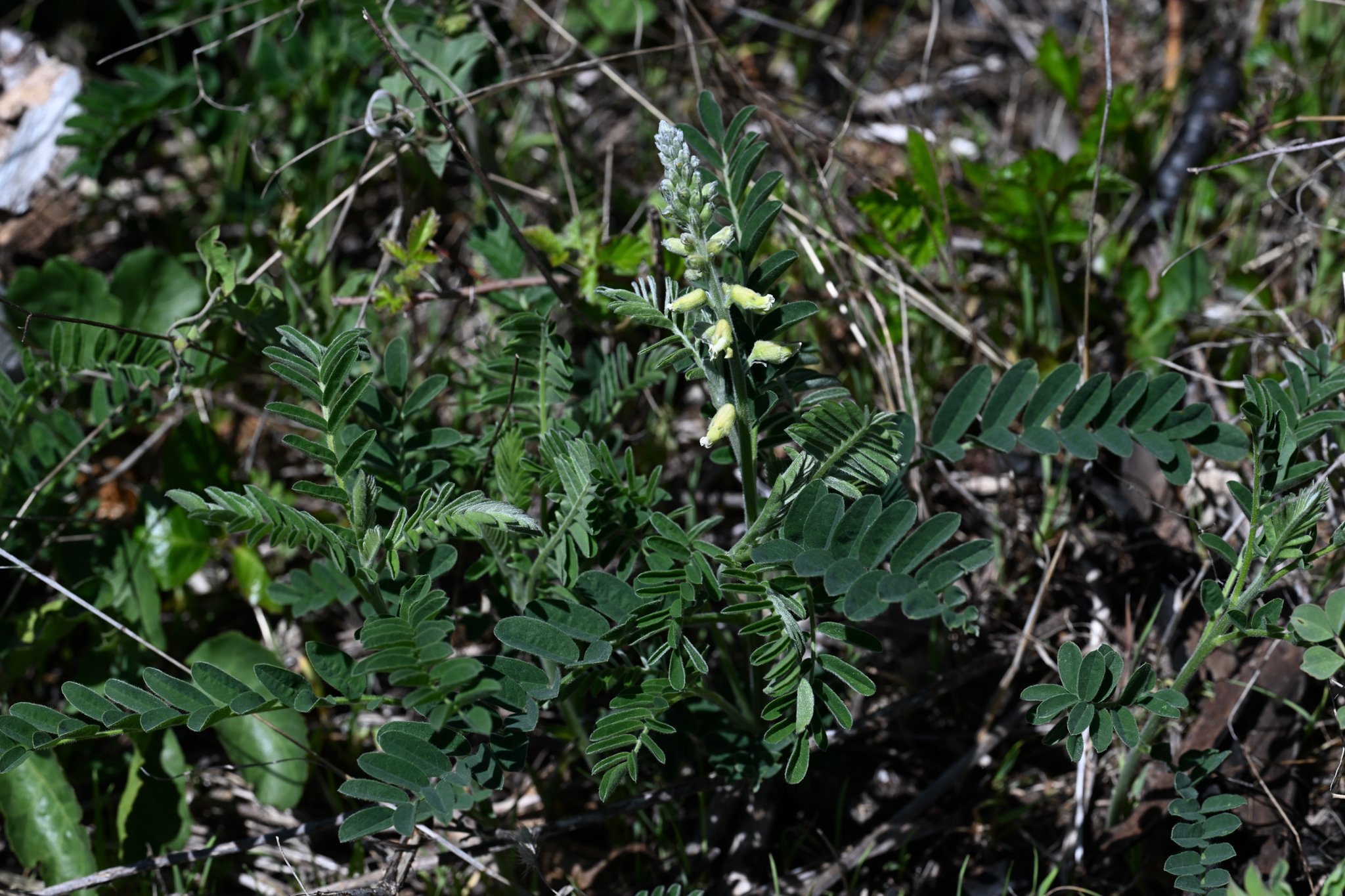

Scientific classification
- Kingdom: Plantae
- Clade: Tracheophytes
- Clade: Angiosperms
- Clade: Eudicots
- Clade: Rosids
- Order: Fabales
- Family: Fabaceae
- Subfamily: Faboideae
- Genus: Sophora
- Species: S. leachiana

Binomial name
- Sophora leachiana M.E. Peck

Synonyms
- Vexibia leachiana (M.E. Peck) W.A. Weber

= Sophora leachiana =

Species of legume

Sophora leachiana, commonly known as the western necklacepod or as western sophora, is a perennial plant in the family Fabaceae endemic to the Siskiyou Mountains of southwestern Oregon. It is an early successional species whose ecology is closely linked to fire.

== Description ==
Sophora leachiana is an herbaceous perennial growing to 3–5 dm in height, with leaves 1–2 dm long bearing 19–33 oblong leaflets, 1.5–2.5 cm in length. The stems and undersides of leaves are covered in soft gray hairs. The inflorescences are 5–15 cm tall, bearing 20–50 flowers that bloom in May and June. Flowers are creamy white and held in downward-pointing, bell-shaped calyces. The fruit is a 3–4 cm long, torulose legume containing one or two mustard-colored or light-brown seeds.

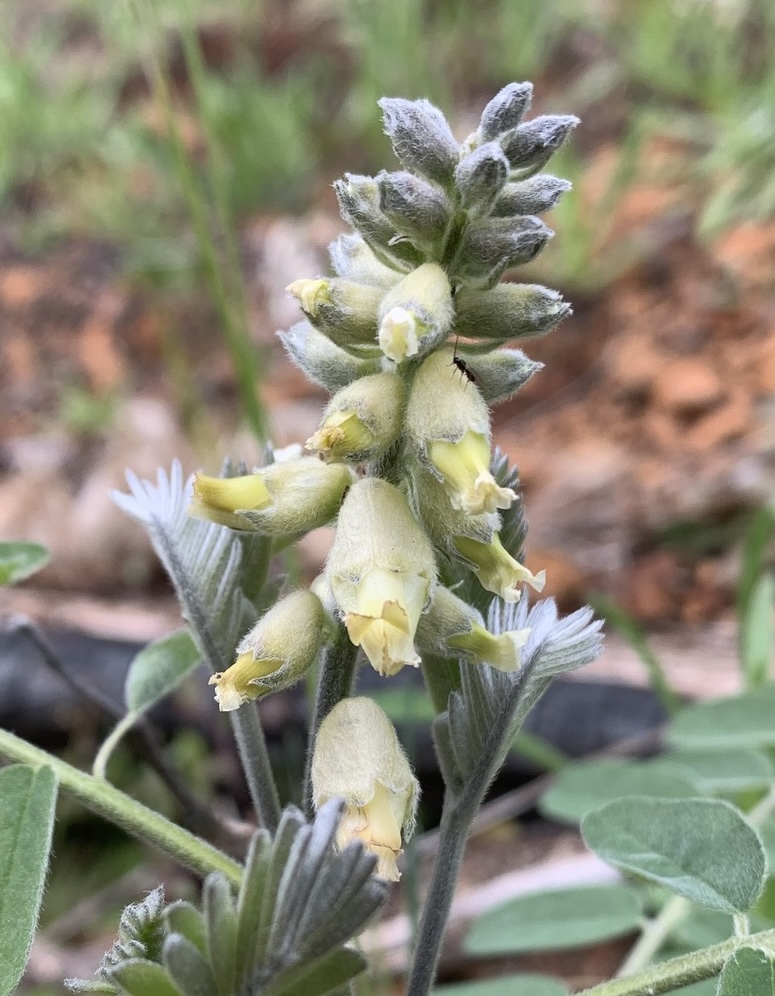
an inflorescence with cream-colored flowers

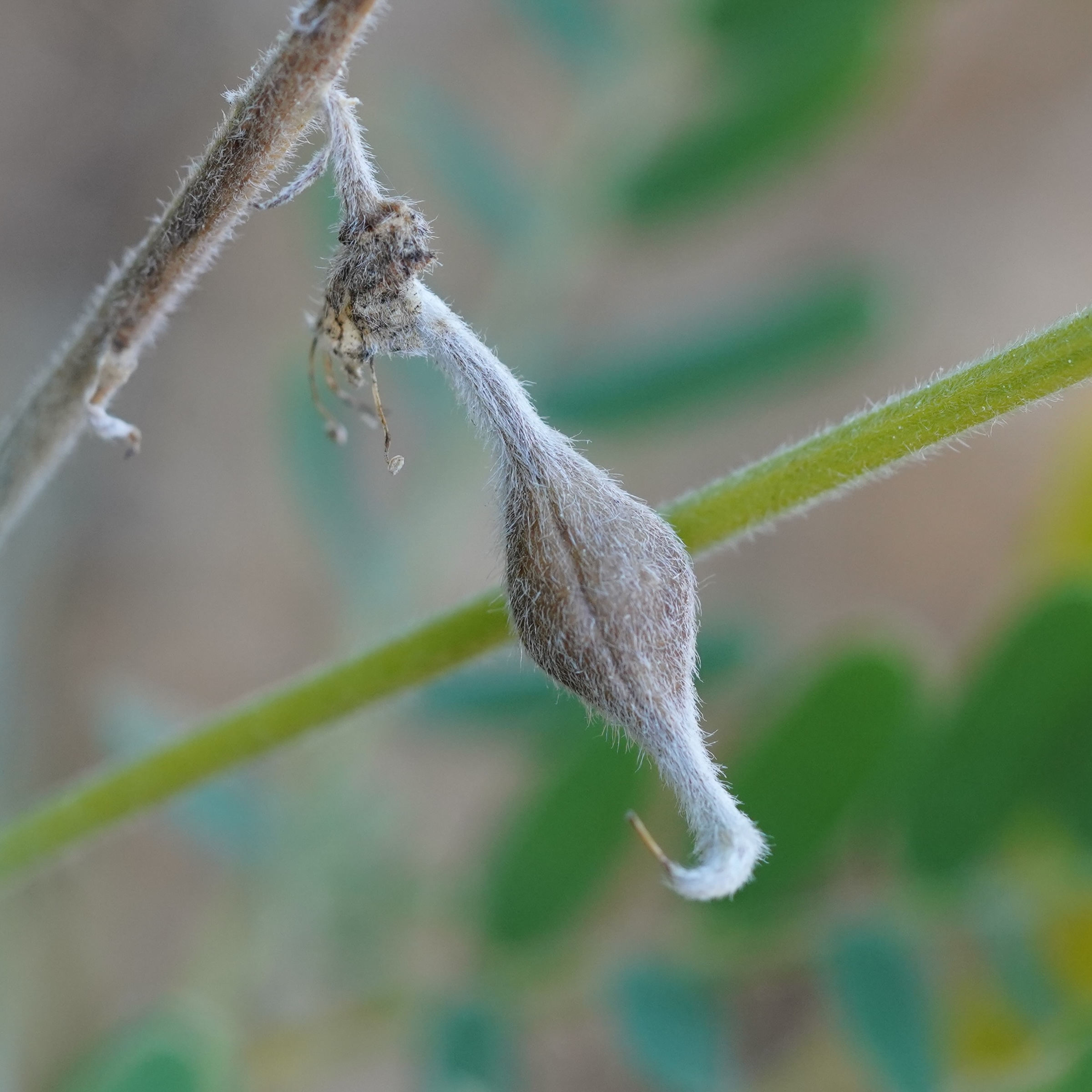
a fruit, bulging where it contains a single seed

== Taxonomy ==
Morton Peck described S. leachiana in 1941. The type specimen was collected by its namesake Lilla Leach in 1933, near the Rand Ranger Station in Josephine County, Oregon.

In 1987, William Alfred Weber segregated several taxa out of the genus Sophora, giving them recombinations in Vexibia. Soon afterward, he also moved S. leachiana into Vexibia, giving it the recombination Vexibia leachiana. Modern taxonomic authorities, including Plants of the World Online, Flora of North America, and the Oregon Flora Project, support this taxon's placement in Sophora.

== Distribution ==
Sophora leachiana has a very narrow geographic distribution, occurring only in Josephine and Curry counties in southwestern Oregon. It grows in mixed-conifer forests in the Siskiyou Mountains, mostly on south or west–facing slopes or on flats by perennial creeks. In 1978, Cheryl Crowder surveyed the thirteen known populations of S. leachiana, which varied in elevation between 335 and 658 m, and all of which showed signs of heavy disturbance, either by fire or human activity. These sites were mostly exposed to full sun, but a few occurred in partial shade.

== Ecology ==
After fires, S. leachiana is a pioneer species species, competing significantly with conifers and grasses. The rhizomes are fire-resistant, and fire may also play an important role in seed germination. In stages of later succession, as the forest canopy closes, S. leachiana may persist vegetatively and spread via rhizomes, but it ceases to flower.

A common pathogen of S. leachiana is the rust fungus Uromyces hyalinus, which is also known to infect S. nuttalliana. Infection by this fungus is marked by the presence of patches of brown spores on the leaves and aerial shoots, though in severe cases, the spores may completely cover a shoot and result in its death.

Thrips in the genus Odontothrips are also common on S. leachiana inflorescences, where they feed on the plant's flowers, reducing its seed yield. Additionally, an unidentified species of moth has been noted as a specialist on S. leachiana, with adults landing almost exclusively on the plant's leaf undersides and with larvae constructing shelters by webbing together clusters of leaves.

== Conservation ==
NatureServe and the Oregon Biodiversity Information Center both list S. leachiana as imperiled, citing the plant's rarity, threats by habitat destruction, and the negative effects of fire suppression. Of the thirty-eight documented populations, plants have not been observed for twenty years at four sites, and ten additional sites have poor viability. Because the plants produce few seeds, it is unlikely to spread beyond its current range.
