= Sophora wightii =

Conservation status
- Endangered (IUCN 2.3)

Scientific classification
- Kingdom: Plantae
- Clade: Tracheophytes
- Clade: Angiosperms
- Clade: Eudicots
- Clade: Rosids
- Order: Fabales
- Family: Fabaceae
- Subfamily: Faboideae
- Genus: Sophora
- Species: S. wightii

Binomial name
- Sophora wightii Baker

Species of legume

Sophora wightii is a species of flowering plant in the family Fabaceae, that is endemic to Tamil Nadu, India.
