= Agnippe albidorsella =

Scientific classification
- Kingdom: Animalia
- Phylum: Arthropoda
- Class: Insecta
- Order: Lepidoptera
- Family: Gelechiidae
- Genus: Agnippe
- Species: A. albidorsella

Binomial name
- Agnippe albidorsella (Snellen, 1884)

Synonyms
- Recurvaria albidorsella Snellen, 1884; Evippe albidorsella

Species of moth

Agnippe albidorsella is a moth of the family Gelechiidae. It is found in Russia (Primorsky Region, Amur Region, Chita Region), China (Gansu, Henan, Ningxia, Zhejiang), Korea and Japan.

The wingspan is 9–10.2 mm. Adults are on wing from May to August. There are three or more generations per year in Japan.

The larvae feed on Lespedeza species.
