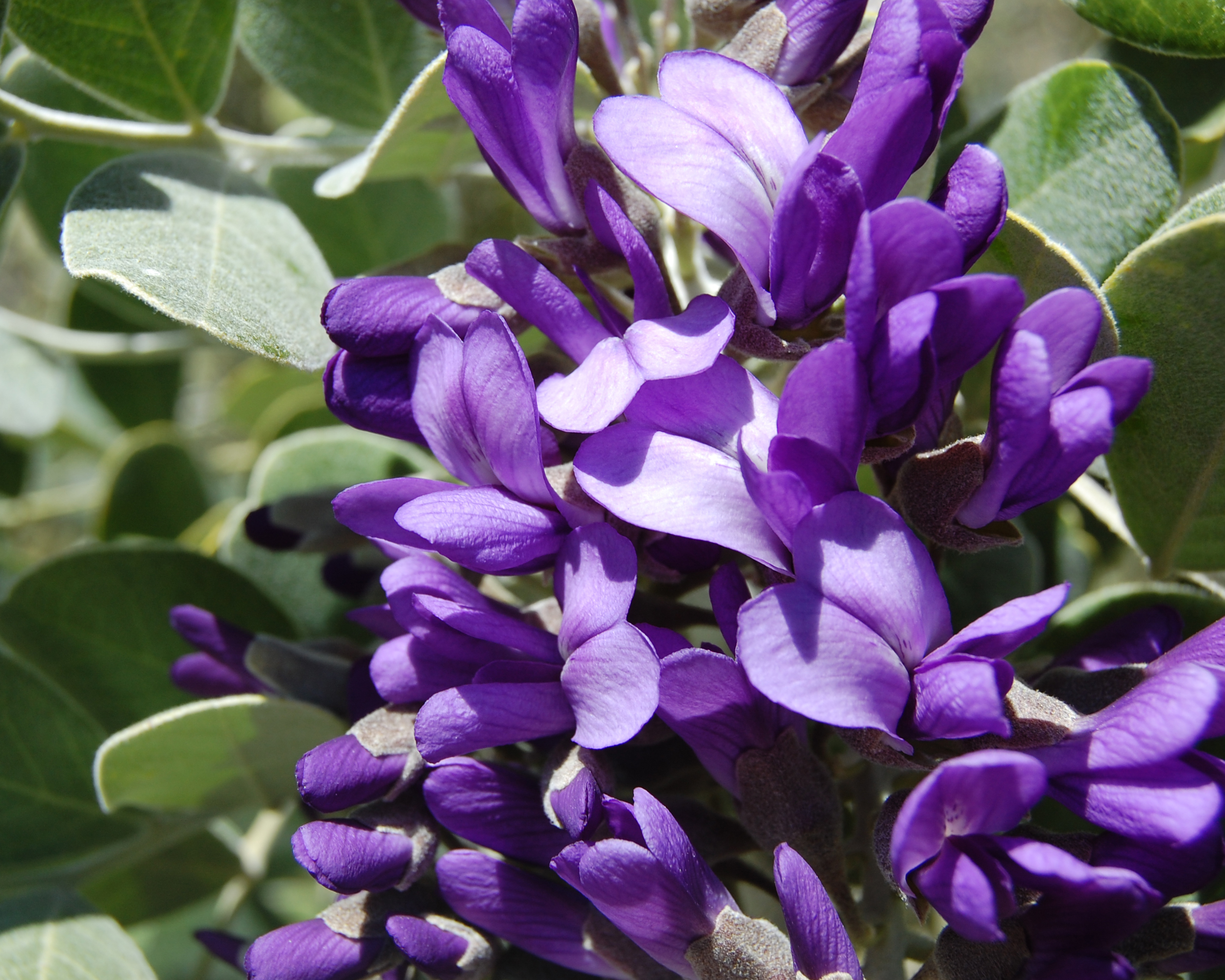
- Dermatophyllum secundiflorum flowers and leaves

Conservation status
- Least Concern (IUCN 3.1)

Scientific classification
- Kingdom: Plantae
- Clade: Embryophytes
- Clade: Tracheophytes
- Clade: Angiosperms
- Clade: Eudicots
- Clade: Rosids
- Order: Fabales
- Family: Fabaceae
- Subfamily: Faboideae
- Genus: Dermatophyllum
- Species: D. secundiflorum

Binomial name
- Dermatophyllum secundiflorum (Ortega) Gandhi & Reveal
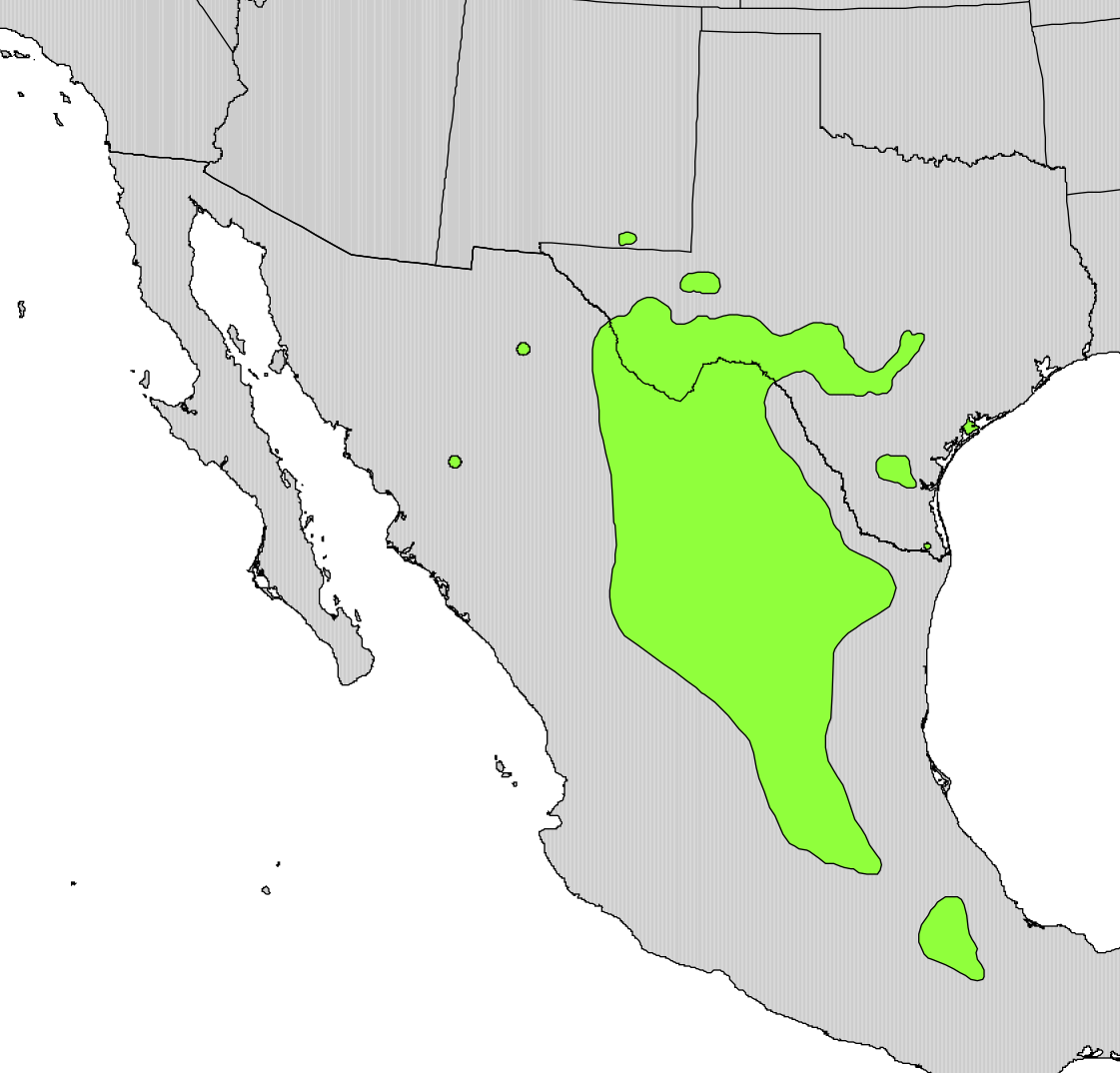
- Natural range

Synonyms
- Broussonetia secundiflora Ortega; Calia erythrosperma Terán & Berland.; Calia secundiflora (Ortega) Yakovlev; Calia secundiflora f. xanthosperma (Rehder) Yakovlev; Calia secundiflora subsp. albofoliolata Yakovlev; Cladrastis secundiflora (Ortega) Raf.; Dermatophyllum speciosum Scheele; Sophora secundiflora (Ortega) Lag. ex DC.; Sophora secundiflora f. xanthosperma Rehder; Sophora speciosa (Scheele) Benth.; Virgilia secundiflora (Ortega) Cav.

= Dermatophyllum secundiflorum =

Species of plant

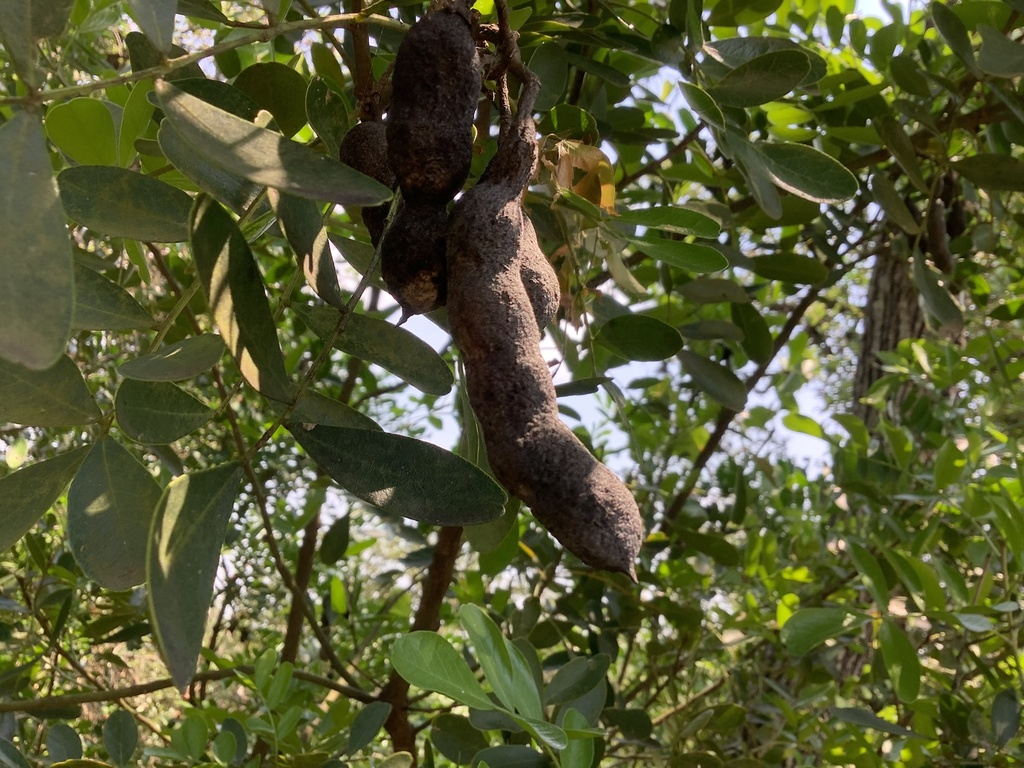
A specimen of Dermatophyllum secundiflorum in its fruiting stage.

Dermatophyllum secundiflorum is a species of flowering shrub or small tree in the family Fabaceae that is native to the Southwestern United States (Texas, New Mexico) and Mexico (Chihuahua and Coahuila south to Hidalgo, Puebla, and Querétaro). Its common names include Texas mountain laurel, Texas mescalbean, grape Koolaid tree, frijolito, and frijolillo.

== Name ==
Although "mescalbean" is among the plant's common monikers, it bears no relation to the Agave species used to make the spirit mezcal, nor to the peyote cactus (Lophophora williamsii), which contains the hallucinogenic alkaloid mescaline. The common name "Texas mountain laurel" is also misleading, as it is unrelated to true mountain laurel.

== Description ==
An evergreen, this small tree's leaves are pinnately compound, with small, roughly spatulate leaflets. The leaflets are thick, and waxy to the touch. Rarely having a single, straight trunk, its bark is smooth in all but the oldest specimens. It grows slowly to a height of 15 ft (4.6 m) and has a crown diameter of 10 ft (3.0 m).

Extremely fragrant purple flowers, resembling the smell of grape soda, are produced in large clusters in March and April. They are followed by 4 in (10 cm) pods containing dark or bright orange or red seeds.

== Habitat ==
It is well-adapted to arid and semiarid habitats, but is most common in riparian zones.

== Uses ==
D. secundiflorum is a popular ornamental plant due to its showy flowers and orange seeds. The reddish wood that it produces is potentially useful, but as yet has little commercial value.

The seeds were once used by some Native American tribes as a recreational drug, before being supplanted by peyote. This plant is psychoactive but is also extremely toxic due to the presence of the bicyclic alkaloid cytisine, which is chemically related to nicotine. The consumption of a single seed is enough to kill an adult.
