= Agnippe lunaki =

Scientific classification
- Domain: Eukaryota
- Kingdom: Animalia
- Phylum: Arthropoda
- Class: Insecta
- Order: Lepidoptera
- Family: Gelechiidae
- Genus: Agnippe
- Species: A. lunaki

Binomial name
- Agnippe lunaki (Rebel, 1941)

Synonyms
- Stenolechia lunaki Rebel, 1941; Evippe penicillata Amsel, 1961; Agnippe penicillata

Species of moth

Agnippe lunaki is a moth of the family Gelechiidae. It is found in Greece, North Macedonia and on Crete. It is also present in Turkey and Syria.

The wingspan is 7.8–9 mm. Adults are on wing from June to July.
