= Sofalcone =

Chemical compound

Clinical data
- AHFS/Drugs.com: International Drug Names
- Routes of administration: Oral
- ATC code: none

Legal status
- Legal status: In general: ℞ (Prescription only)

Identifiers
- IUPAC name: [5-[(3-Methylbut-2-en-1-yl)oxy]-2-((2E)-3-{4-[(3-methylbut-2-en-1-yl)oxy]phenyl}prop-2-enoyl)phenoxy]acetic acid
- CAS Number: 153175-87-2
- PubChem CID: 5282219
- ChemSpider: 4445402
- UNII: 2B668TJX8E
- KEGG: D01956
- ChEBI: CHEBI:135732
- CompTox Dashboard (EPA): DTXSID50860797 DTXSID5023586, DTXSID50860797

Chemical and physical data
- Formula: C_{27}H_{30}O_{6}
- Molar mass: 450.531 g·mol^{−1}
- 3D model (JSmol): Interactive image
- SMILES: CC(=CCOC1=CC=C(C=C1)C=CC(=O)C2=C(C=C(C=C2)OCC=C(C)C)OCC(=O)O)C
- InChI: InChI=1S/C27H30O6/c1-19(2)13-15-31-22-8-5-21(6-9-22)7-12-25(28)24-11-10-23(32-16-14-20(3)4)17-26(24)33-18-27(29)30/h5-14,17H,15-16,18H2,1-4H3,(H,29,30)/b12-7+; Key:GFWRVVCDTLRWPK-KPKJPENVSA-N

Sofalcone (INN) is an oral gastrointestinal medication used in Japan. It is a synthetic analog of sophoradin, a type of natural phenol found in Sophora tonkinensis, an herb used in traditional Chinese medicine.
