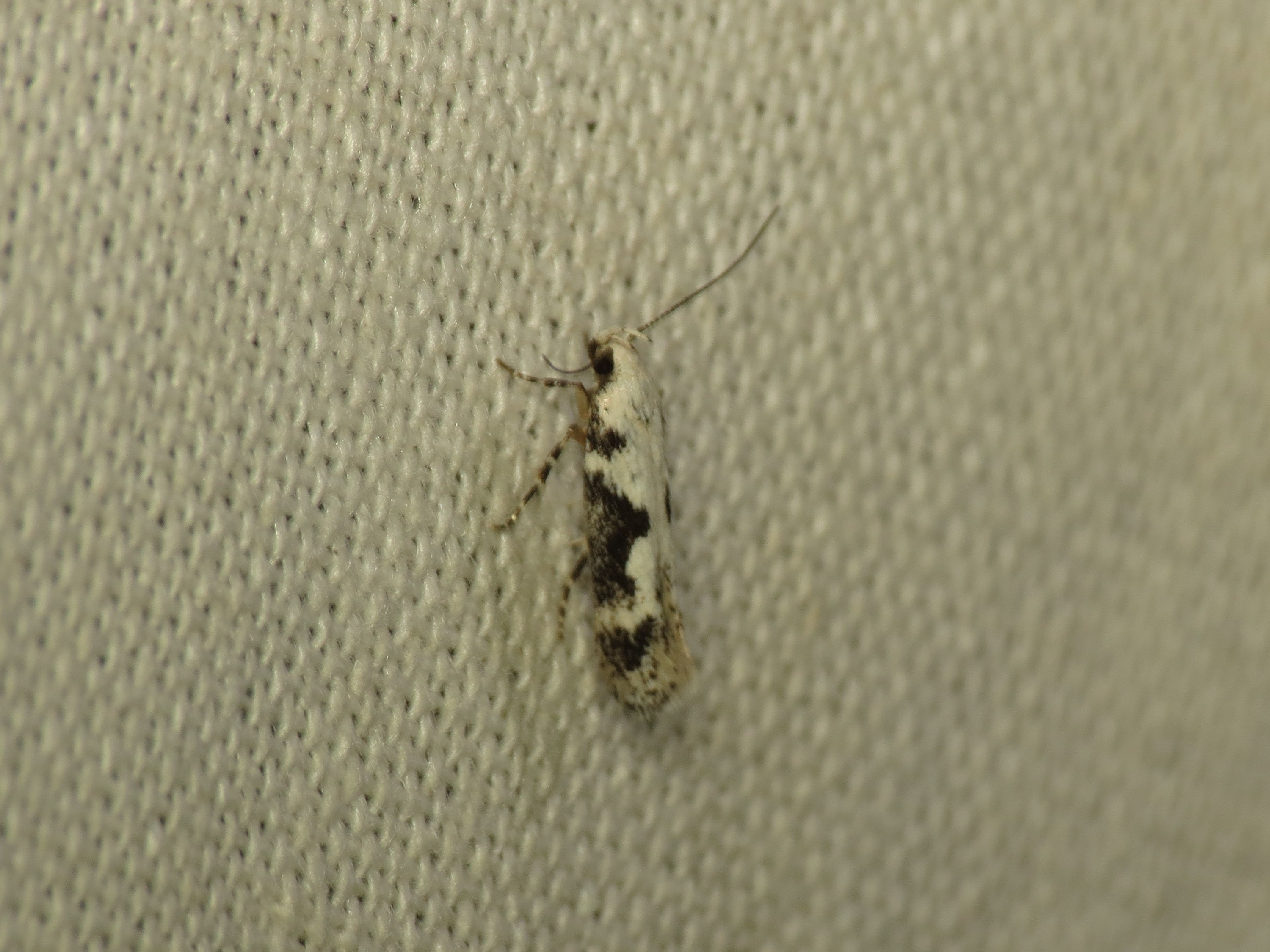

Scientific classification
- Kingdom: Animalia
- Phylum: Arthropoda
- Clade: Pancrustacea
- Class: Insecta
- Order: Lepidoptera
- Family: Gelechiidae
- Genus: Agnippe
- Species: A. laudatella

Binomial name
- Agnippe laudatella (Walsingham, 1907)

Synonyms
- Gelechia laudatella Walsingham, 1907; Evippe laudatella

= Agnippe laudatella =

Species of moth

Agnippe laudatella is a moth of the family Gelechiidae. It is found in California, United States.

The wingspan is about 10.5 mm. The forewings are white, the base of the costa and the extreme base of the dorsum brownish fuscous. An elongate brownish fuscous spot lies above the middle of the wing between and projecting farther than the brown above and below it and a large brownish fuscous patch begins at the basal fourth of the costa, its inner edge sloping obliquely toward, but not attaining, the middle of the dorsum. Beyond its lower point it is indented upward to the middle of the wing and thence continued to the apical fourth, where its straight outer edge is margined by a narrow band of white. The apical portion of the wing, together with the grayish white cilia, is dusted and clouded with brown, and at the base of the cilia, beyond the middle of the dorsum, are a few brownish fuscous scales. The hindwings are pale gray.

The larvae feed on Quercus species.
