= Agnippe miniscula =

Scientific classification
- Domain: Eukaryota
- Kingdom: Animalia
- Phylum: Arthropoda
- Class: Insecta
- Order: Lepidoptera
- Family: Gelechiidae
- Genus: Agnippe
- Species: A. miniscula

Binomial name
- Agnippe miniscula (Li, 1993)

Synonyms
- Evippe miniscula Li, 1993

Species of moth

Agnippe miniscula is a moth of the family Gelechiidae. It is found in China (Xinjiang).

The wingspan is 6–8 mm. Adults are on wing from June to July.
