= Agnippe aequorea =

Scientific classification
- Kingdom: Animalia
- Phylum: Arthropoda
- Class: Insecta
- Order: Lepidoptera
- Family: Gelechiidae
- Genus: Agnippe
- Species: A. aequorea

Binomial name
- Agnippe aequorea (Meyrick, 1917)

Synonyms
- Recurvaria aequorea Meyrick, 1917; Evippe aequorea Meyrick, 1917

Species of moth

Agnippe aequorea is a moth in the family Gelechiidae. It is found in Peru.

The wingspan is about 8 mm. The forewings are dark fuscous, sprinkled with whitish and with a cloudy whitish dorsal streak from the base to tornus, speckled with dark fuscous, pointed posteriorly, edge irregular. The hindwings are pale slaty-grey in males and grey in females.
