= Agnippe novisyrictis =

Scientific classification
- Domain: Eukaryota
- Kingdom: Animalia
- Phylum: Arthropoda
- Class: Insecta
- Order: Lepidoptera
- Family: Gelechiidae
- Genus: Agnippe
- Species: A. novisyrictis

Binomial name
- Agnippe novisyrictis (Li, 1993)

Synonyms
- Evippe novisyrictis Li, 1993

Species of moth

Agnippe novisyrictis is a moth of the family Gelechiidae. It is found in China (Gansu, Hebei, Henan, Shaanxi) and Russia (Primorsky Region).
