= Sophora violacea =

Conservation status
- Critically Endangered (IUCN 3.1)

Scientific classification
- Kingdom: Plantae
- Clade: Tracheophytes
- Clade: Angiosperms
- Clade: Eudicots
- Clade: Rosids
- Order: Fabales
- Family: Fabaceae
- Subfamily: Faboideae
- Genus: Sophora
- Species: S. violacea

Binomial name
- Sophora violacea Thwaites

Synonyms
- Sophora rubriflora P.C.Tsoong

Species of plant

Sophora violacea (S. rubriflora) grows naturally in the west of the Sri Lanka from north to south east and Java.
