= Agnippe abdita =

Scientific classification
- Kingdom: Animalia
- Phylum: Arthropoda
- Class: Insecta
- Order: Lepidoptera
- Family: Gelechiidae
- Genus: Agnippe
- Species: A. abdita

Binomial name
- Agnippe abdita (Braun, 1925)

Synonyms
- Evippe abdita Braun, 1925

Species of moth

Agnippe abdita is a moth in the family Gelechiidae. It is found in North America, where it has been recorded from Utah, Arizona and California.

The wingspan is 8.5–9 mm. The forewings are white dusted with dark fuscous, the lightly dusted areas forming defined markings, contrasting with the heavily dusted and blackish areas. A lightly dusted irregular stripe runs along the dorsum from the base to the tornus, at the basal third sending a blunt lobe to the fold. There is a sharper lobe before the tornus, and just beyond the tornus ending in an outwardly oblique whitish streak which nearly meets the apex of an outwardly oblique costal streak. Below the fold, just before and behind the blunt lobe of the dorsal stripe, the wing is black. The hindwings are silvery. Adults have been recorded on wing in March.

The larvae feed on Cercocarpus ledifolius and Cercocarpus montanus. Larvae can be found in March in southern California and in June in eastern California and Utah.
