= Agnippe evippeella =

Scientific classification
- Domain: Eukaryota
- Kingdom: Animalia
- Phylum: Arthropoda
- Class: Insecta
- Order: Lepidoptera
- Family: Gelechiidae
- Genus: Agnippe
- Species: A. evippeella

Binomial name
- Agnippe evippeella Busck, 1906

Synonyms
- Agnippe evippella Meyrick, 1925

Species of moth

Agnippe evippeella is a moth in the family Gelechiidae. It is found in North America, where it has been recorded from Texas, Cuba and Puerto Rico.

The wingspan is about 8 mm (0.31 in). The costal and apical part of the forewings is black, slightly sprinkled with white scales, especially the apical part. The dorsal part below the fold is white, slightly sprinkled with dark scales. The black part protrudes down into the white part with two triangular lobes. At apical third is an ill-defined white costal spot. The hindwings are dark fuscous.
