= Sophora mangarevaensis =

Conservation status
- Critically Endangered (IUCN 3.1)

Scientific classification
- Kingdom: Plantae
- Clade: Tracheophytes
- Clade: Angiosperms
- Clade: Eudicots
- Clade: Rosids
- Order: Fabales
- Family: Fabaceae
- Subfamily: Faboideae
- Genus: Sophora
- Species: S. mangarevaensis

Binomial name
- Sophora mangarevaensis H.St.John (1985)

Species of legume

Sophora mangarevaensis is a species of flowering plant in the family Fabaceae. It is a tree endemic to the island of Mangareva in the Tuamotu Archipelago of French Polynesia. It grows on cliffs and on rock outcrops. It is threatened by predation by goats, competition from invasive plants, and fires. There are estimated to be fewer than 250 individuals, and the IUCN Red List assesses the species as Critically Endangered.
