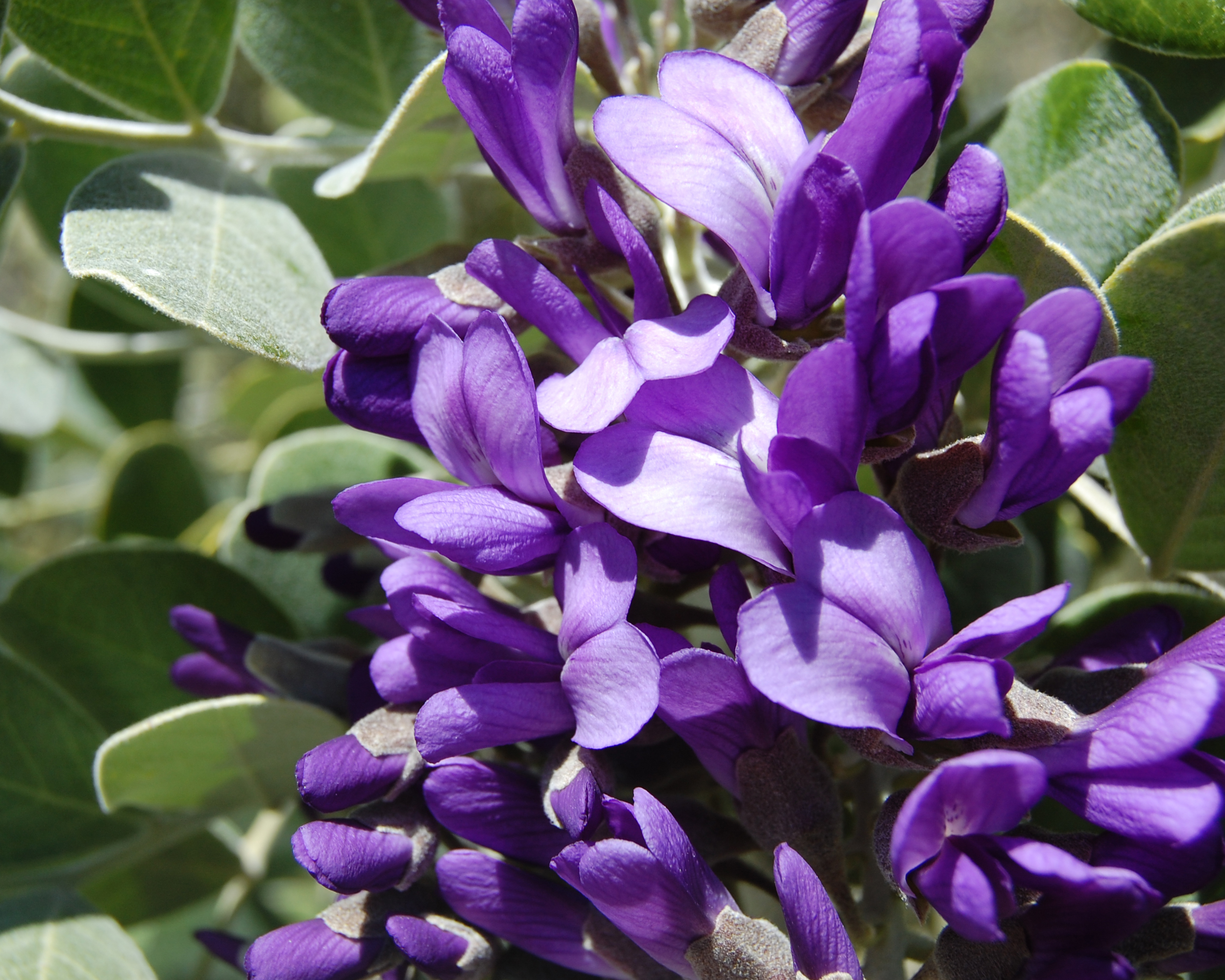
- Dermatophyllum secundiflorum

Scientific classification
- Kingdom: Plantae
- Clade: Tracheophytes
- Clade: Angiosperms
- Clade: Eudicots
- Clade: Rosids
- Order: Fabales
- Family: Fabaceae
- Subfamily: Faboideae
- Clade: Meso-Papilionoideae
- Genus: Dermatophyllum; Scheele

Type species
- Dermatophyllum speciosum Scheele

Species
- 5; see text

Synonyms
- Agastianis Raf.; Broussonetia Ortega; Calia Terán Berland.; Sophora sect. Arizoniatae Tsoong; Sophora sect. Agastianis (Raf.) Tsoong; Sophora sect. Calia (Terán & Berland.) Rudd

= Dermatophyllum =

Genus of plants

Dermatophyllum/Sophora secundiflora is a genus of three or four species of shrubs and small trees in the family Fabaceae. The genus is native to southwestern North America from western Texas to New Mexico and Arizona in the United States, and south through Chihuahua, Coahuila, and Nuevo León in northern Mexico. Members of the genus are commonly known as mescalbean, mescal bean, or frijolito. One of the common names of Dermatophyllum secundiflorum is Texas mountain laurel, although the name mountain laurel also refers to the very dissimilar and unrelated genus Kalmia (family Ericaceae) and the name laurel refers generally to plants in the unrelated order Laurales. Dermatophyllum secundiflorum is one of the most abundant woody species in the Texas Hill Country or the Edwards Plateau.

Although still commonly treated in the genus Sophora, recent genetic evidence has shown that the mescalbeans are only distantly related to the other species of Sophora.

== Species ==
Dermatophyllum comprises the following species:

- Dermatophyllum arizonicum (S.Watson) Vincent—Arizona mescalbean (Arizona, Chihuahua)
  - subsp. arizonicum (S.Watson) Vincent
  - subsp. formosum (Kearney & Peebles) Vincent (Arizona)
- Dermatophyllum gypsophilum (B.L. Turner & A.M. Powell) Vincent—Guadalupe mescalbean (southern New Mexico, western Texas, Coahuila)
  - subsp. guadalupense (B.L.Turner & A.M.Powell) Vincent
  - subsp. gypsophilum
- Dermatophyllum juanhintonianum (B.L. Turner) B.L. Turner
- Dermatophyllum purpusii (Brandegee) Vincent
- Dermatophyllum secundiflorum (Ortega) Gandhi & Reveal—Texas mescalbean (Texas, New Mexico, Coahuila, Nuevo León)

== Description ==
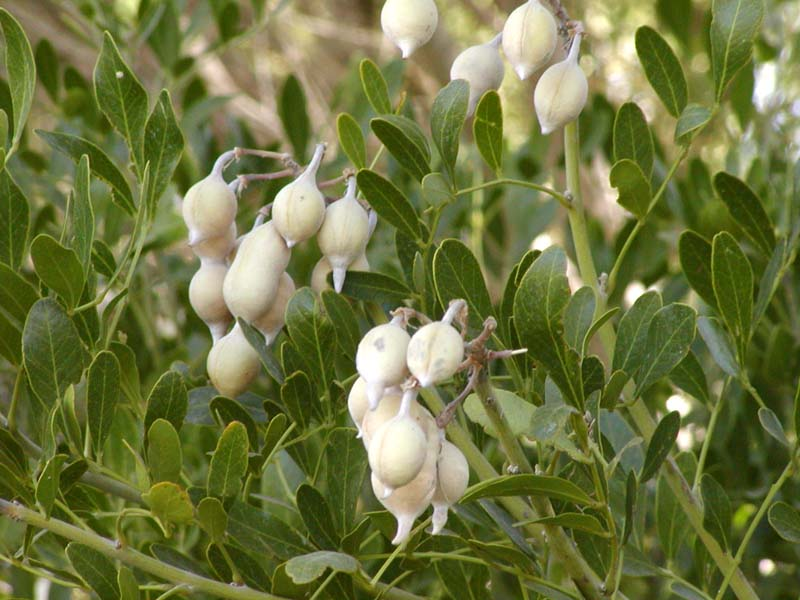
Seedpods

Dermatophyllum spp. grow to 1–11 m (3.3–36.1 ft) tall, with a trunk up to 20 cm (7.9 in) in diameter, often growing in dense thickets that grow from basal shoots. The leaves are evergreen, leathery, 6–15 cm (2.4–5.9 in) long, pinnate with 5-11 oval leaflets, 2–5 centimetres (0.79–1.97 in) long and 1–3 cm (0.39–1.18 in) broad. The flowers, produced in spring, are fragrant, purple, typical pea-flower in shape, borne in erect or spreading racemes 4–10 cm (1.6–3.9 in) long. The fruit is a hard, woody seedpod 2–15 cm (0.79–5.91 in) long, containing one to six oval, bright red seeds 1–1.5 cm (0.39–0.59 in) long and 1 cm (0.39 in) in diameter.

Mescal beans contain the alkaloid cytisine, which is used medically to help with smoking cessation. Evidence exists that the seeds of the plant have been used in a ritualistic context as a hallucinogen by some Native American peoples. The symptoms of cytisine poisoning are very unpleasant. This has led to speculation that the peyote cult may have developed as a relatively safe substitute for the potentially toxic mescalbean, given the close parallels in performance and divination between the two (including leaders of Plains Indian peyote rituals wearing a necklace of mescalbeans).
