= Sophoradin =

- Chemical structure of sophoradin

Names
- Preferred IUPAC name 2′,4,4′-Trihydroxy-3,3′,5-tris(3-methylbut-2-en-1-yl)chalcone

Identifiers
CAS Number	23057-54-7; 31934-68-6
3D model (JSmol)	Interactive image
ChemSpider	4479146
PubChem CID	5321393
UNII	GLR4RE4EBU
CompTox Dashboard (EPA)	DTXSID601029516
- InChI: InChI=1S/C30H36O4/c1-19(2)7-11-23-17-22(18-24(29(23)33)12-8-20(3)4)10-15-27(31)26-14-16-28(32)25(30(26)34)13-9-21(5)6/h7-10,14-18,32-34H,11-13H2,1-6H3/b15-10+ Key: YAPAFDNQABLIIN-XNTDXEJSSA-N; InChI=1/C30H36O4/c1-19(2)7-11-23-17-22(18-24(29(23)33)12-8-20(3)4)10-15-27(31)26-14-16-28(32)25(30(26)34)13-9-21(5)6/h7-10,14-18,32-34H,11-13H2,1-6H3/b15-10+ Key: YAPAFDNQABLIIN-XNTDXEJSBZ
- SMILES: O=C(c1ccc(O)c(c1O)C\C=C(/C)C)\C=C\c2cc(c(O)c(c2)C/C=C(\C)C)C\C=C(/C)C

Properties
Chemical formula	C_{30}H_{36}O_{4}
Molar mass	460.614 g·mol^{−1}
- Except where otherwise noted, data are given for materials in their standard state (at 25 °C [77 °F], 100 kPa). verify (what is ?) Infobox references

Sophoradin is an isoprenyl chalconoid, a type of polyphenolic compound, found in Sophora tonkinensis, an herb used in traditional Chinese medicine.

Sofalcone is an oral gastrointestinal medication and a synthetic analog of sophoradin.
