= Sophora stenophylla =

Scientific classification
- Kingdom: Plantae
- Clade: Tracheophytes
- Clade: Angiosperms
- Clade: Eudicots
- Clade: Rosids
- Order: Fabales
- Family: Fabaceae
- Subfamily: Faboideae
- Genus: Sophora
- Species: S. stenophylla

Binomial name
- Sophora stenophylla A.Gray

Species of legume

Sophora stenophylla, the fringeleaf necklacepod, or silvery sophora, is a perennial plant in the legume family (Fabaceae) found in the Colorado Plateau and Canyonlands region of the southwestern United States.

== Description ==
=== Growth pattern ===
It is a perennial plant that grows 4 to 16 inches (100 to 410 mm) tall. Its lacy leaves and blue to purple flowers make it very distinctive in its communities. It spreads by underground roots.

=== Leaves and stems ===
It has alternate, lacy, compound pinnate leaves with linear leaflets that are covered in dense, soft, and silvery hairs.

=== Inflorescence and fruit ===
It blooms from April to May. The terminal stalks bear 12–39 blue to purple, pea-shaped flowers. Seed pods have short, stiff hairs and 1–5 seeds.

== Habitat and range ==
It can be found in sandy soils in blackbrush scrub, pinyon-juniper woodland, and ponderosa pine forest communities in southern Utah, Arizona, and New Mexico.

== Ecological and human interactions ==
Its foliage and seeds are toxic to livestock in large amounts.
