= Agnippe biscolorella =

Scientific classification
- Kingdom: Animalia
- Phylum: Arthropoda
- Class: Insecta
- Order: Lepidoptera
- Family: Gelechiidae
- Genus: Agnippe
- Species: A. biscolorella

Binomial name
- Agnippe biscolorella Chambers, 1872

Synonyms
- Agnippe bicolorella Meyrick, 1925

Species of moth

Agnippe biscolorella is a moth in the family Gelechiidae. It is found in North America, where it has been recorded from Illinois, Maryland, Ohio, West Virginia and Kentucky.

The base of the forewings is yellowish-ochreous and the remainder is brown with a bluish cast from beyond the base, but from the middle to the apex thickly intermingled with yellowish-ochreous and some white.
