= Agnippe yongdengensis =

Scientific classification
- Domain: Eukaryota
- Kingdom: Animalia
- Phylum: Arthropoda
- Class: Insecta
- Order: Lepidoptera
- Family: Gelechiidae
- Genus: Agnippe
- Species: A. yongdengensis

Binomial name
- Agnippe yongdengensis (Li, 1993)

Synonyms
- Evippe yongdengensis Li, 1993

Species of moth

Agnippe yongdengensis is a moth of the family Gelechiidae. It is found in China (Gansu).

The wingspan is 10 mm.
