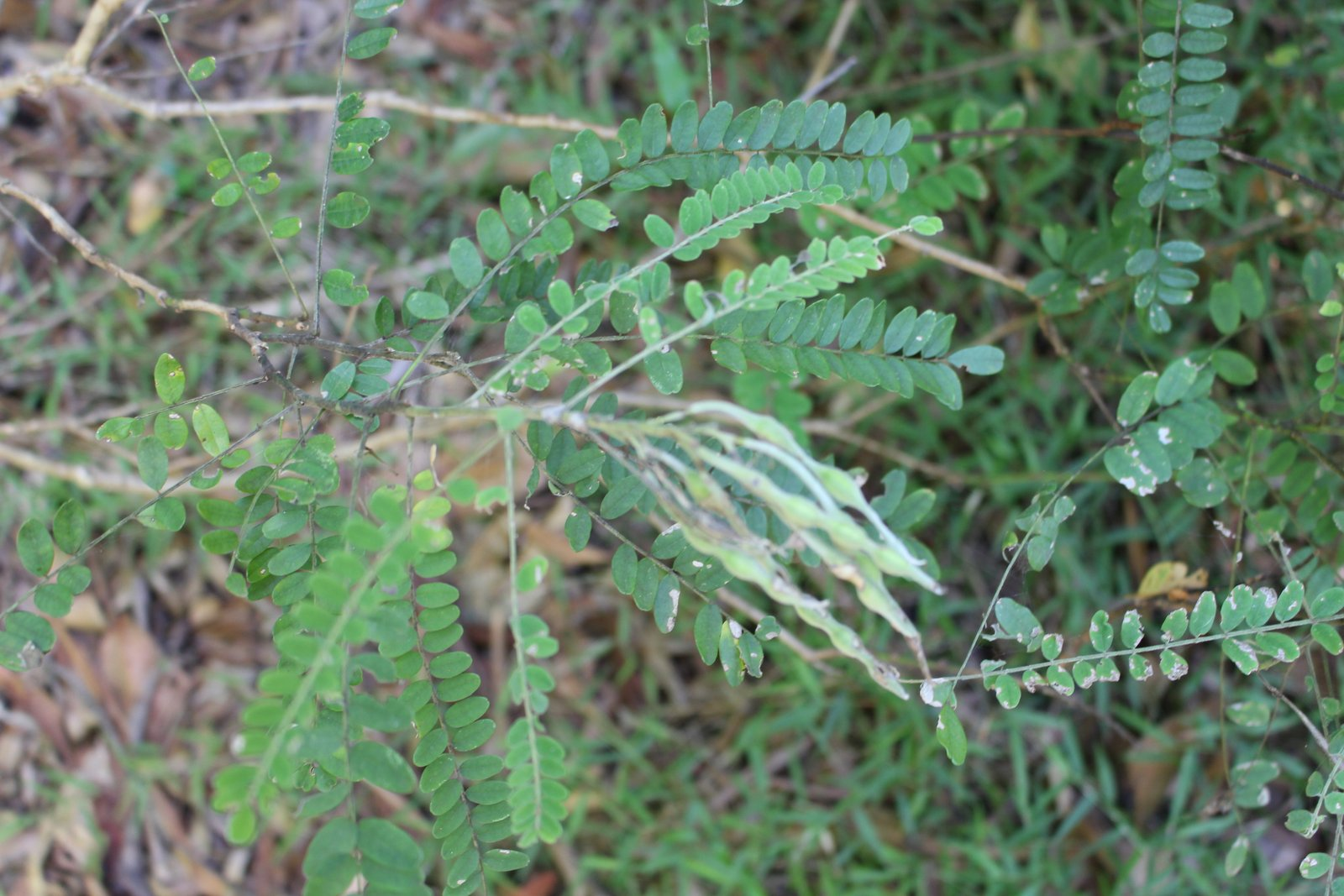

Conservation status
- Vulnerable (EPBC Act)

Scientific classification
- Kingdom: Plantae
- Clade: Tracheophytes
- Clade: Angiosperms
- Clade: Eudicots
- Clade: Rosids
- Order: Fabales
- Family: Fabaceae
- Subfamily: Faboideae
- Genus: Sophora
- Species: S. fraseri

Binomial name
- Sophora fraseri Benth.

= Sophora fraseri =

Species of plant

Sophora fraseri is a rare species of plant in the family Fabaceae. A shrub to 2 metres tall, found in north eastern New South Wales to south eastern Queensland. The habitat is the edges of rainforest or moist eucalyptus forest.
