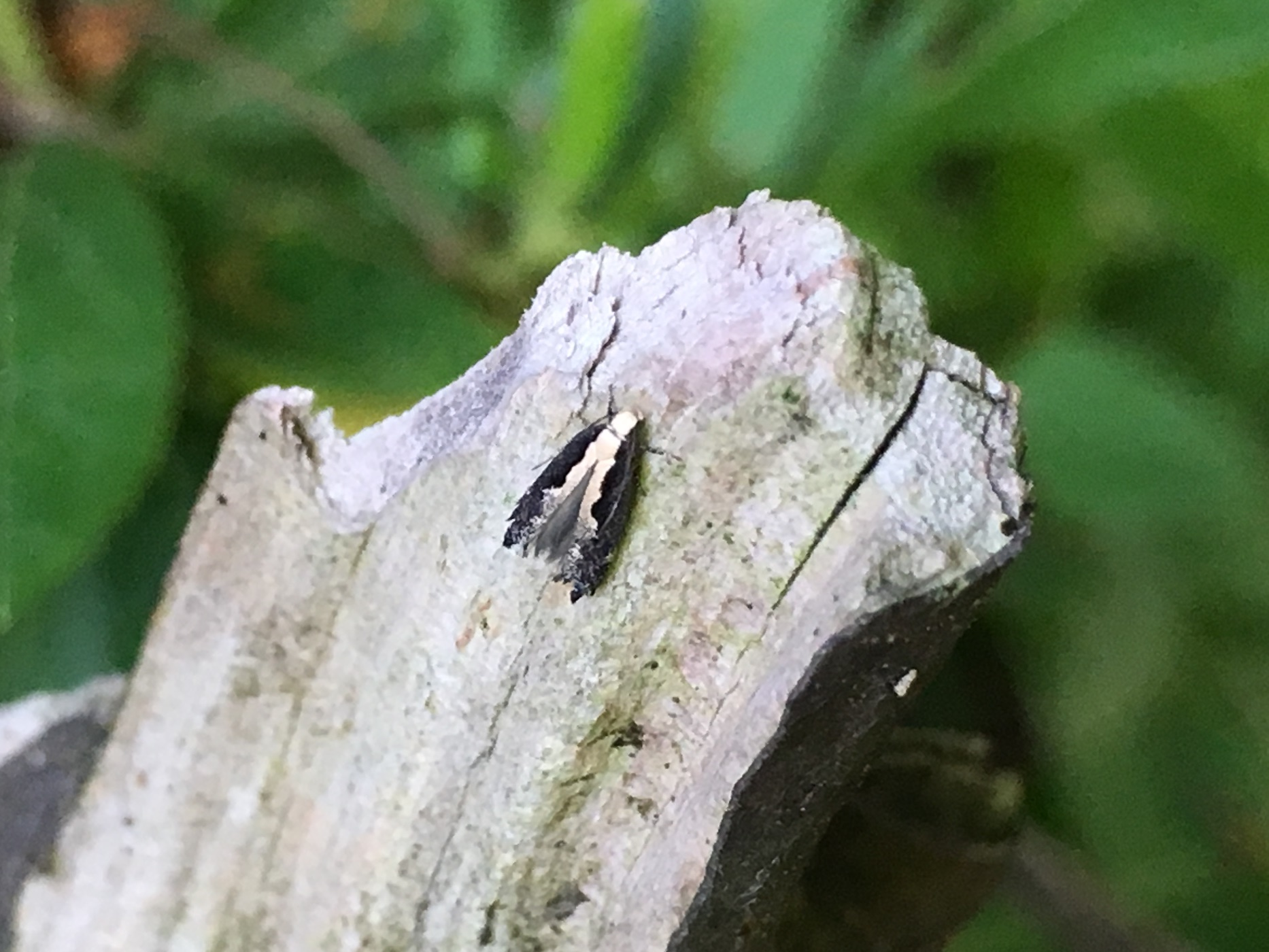

Scientific classification
- Kingdom: Animalia
- Phylum: Arthropoda
- Class: Insecta
- Order: Lepidoptera
- Family: Gelechiidae
- Genus: Agnippe
- Species: A. syrictis

Binomial name
- Agnippe syrictis (Meyrick, 1936)

Synonyms
- Recurvaria syrictis Meyrick, 1936; Evippe syrictis

= Agnippe syrictis =

Species of moth

Agnippe syrictis is a moth of the family Gelechiidae. It is found in Russia (Novosibirsk Region), eastern Kazakhstan, Mongolia, China (Ningxia, Henan, Tianjin), Korea and Japan.

The wingspan is 8–9 mm.

The larvae feed on Pinus species, and possibly also on Larix sibirica, Prunus armeniaca and Prunus persica.
