= Sophora tonkinensis =

Scientific classification
- Kingdom: Plantae
- Clade: Tracheophytes
- Clade: Angiosperms
- Clade: Eudicots
- Clade: Rosids
- Order: Fabales
- Family: Fabaceae
- Subfamily: Faboideae
- Genus: Sophora
- Species: S. tonkinensis

Binomial name
- Sophora tonkinensis Gagnep.

Synonyms
- Sophora subprostrata

Species of legume

Sophora tonkinensis is a herb used in traditional Chinese medicine.

Sofalcone is an oral gastrointestinal medication and a synthetic derivative of sophoradin, an isoprenyl chalcone found in S. tonkinensis.
