= Agnippe omphalopa =

Scientific classification
- Kingdom: Animalia
- Phylum: Arthropoda
- Class: Insecta
- Order: Lepidoptera
- Family: Gelechiidae
- Genus: Agnippe
- Species: A. omphalopa

Binomial name
- Agnippe omphalopa (Meyrick, 1917)

Synonyms
- Tholerostola omphalopa Meyrick, 1917; Aristotelia plumata Meyrick, 1917; Evippe omphalopa Meyrick, 1917

Species of moth

Agnippe omphalopa is a moth in the family Gelechiidae. It is found in Ecuador, the Galapagos Islands and Guyana.

The wingspan is 10–11 mm. The forewings are grey, sprinkled with blackish and tinged with whitish. The plical and second discal stigmata are moderate, ochreous, edged with black marks above and beneath, the first discal small, black, obliquely beyond the plical. There are thick cloudy ferruginous-blackish oblique fasciate bars from the costa at one-sixth, one-third, the middle, and two-thirds, reaching about half across the wing, the second terminated by the plical stigma, the third shorter but with a more oblique projection reaching to the apex of the fourth, both these terminated by the second discal stigma, the fourth being little oblique. There is a cloudy darker spot on the tornus and an irregular blackish pre-apical blotch. The hindwings are grey.
