= Agnippe pseudolella =

Scientific classification
- Domain: Eukaryota
- Kingdom: Animalia
- Phylum: Arthropoda
- Class: Insecta
- Order: Lepidoptera
- Family: Gelechiidae
- Genus: Agnippe
- Species: A. pseudolella

Binomial name
- Agnippe pseudolella (Christoph, 1888)

Synonyms
- Lita pseudolella Christoph, 1888; Phthorimaea pseudolella; Evippe pseudolella; Agnippe pseudolella; Lita cephalella Caradja, 1920

Species of moth

Agnippe pseudolella is a moth of the family Gelechiidae. It is found in Turkey, Russia (Volgograd Oblast, Astrakhan Oblast), Kazakhstan, northern Iran, Turkmenistan, Tajikistan and China (Inner Mongolia).

The wingspan is 8.3–10 mm. Adults are on wing from May to July.
