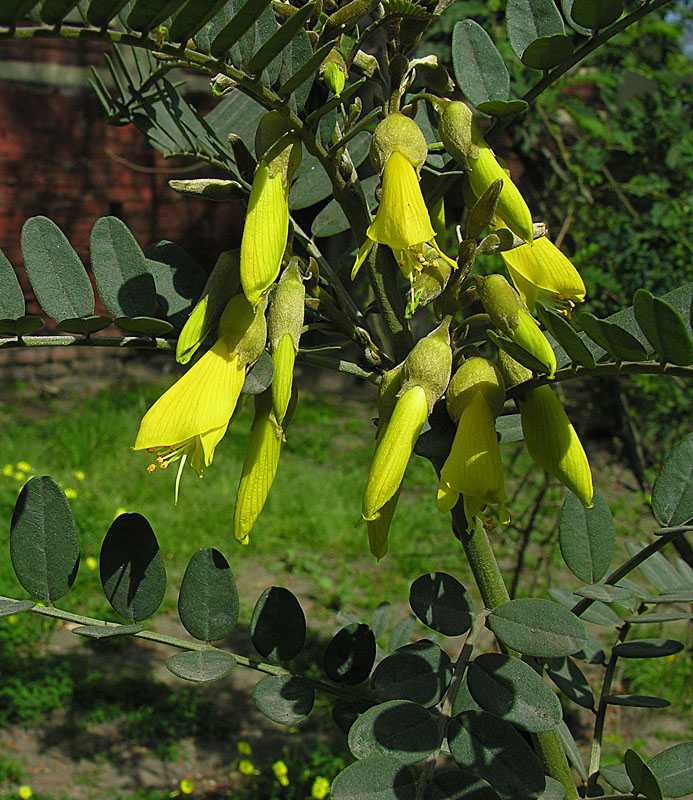
- Sophora macrocarpa flowers and leaves

Scientific classification
- Kingdom: Plantae
- Clade: Tracheophytes
- Clade: Angiosperms
- Clade: Eudicots
- Clade: Rosids
- Order: Fabales
- Family: Fabaceae
- Subfamily: Faboideae
- Genus: Sophora
- Species: S. macrocarpa

Binomial name
- Sophora macrocarpa Smith, 1798

= Sophora macrocarpa =

Species of legume

Sophora macrocarpa is a species of flowering tree or shrub of the genus Sophora of the family Fabaceae. It is commonly known as mayú or mayo, and is endemic to central and southern continental Chile.

== Description ==
Sophora macrocarpa is a small evergreen tree or large shrub, growing to a height of about 3 m (10 ft) with long slender branches. The new growth is pubescent, with reddish-brown hairs. The leaves are alternate and up to 15 cm (6 in) in length. They are pinnate, each with nine to fifteen leaflets. The leaflets are dark green on the upperside and slightly glaucous underneath. The dangling clusters of flowers have long thick stems. Each flower has five pale brown calyx lobes fused into a cup, five long yellow petals and ten stamens. The fruit is a pod containing several seeds. The flowering period is August to December.
