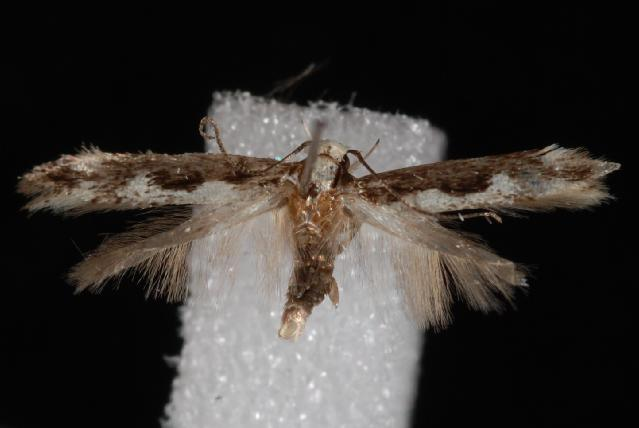

Scientific classification
- Kingdom: Animalia
- Phylum: Arthropoda
- Clade: Pancrustacea
- Class: Insecta
- Order: Lepidoptera
- Family: Gelechiidae
- Genus: Agnippe
- Species: A. prunifoliella

Binomial name
- Agnippe prunifoliella (Chambers, 1873)

Synonyms
- Evippe prunifoliella Chambers, 1873

= Agnippe prunifoliella =

Species of moth

Agnippe prunifoliella is a moth in the family Gelechiidae. It is found in North America, where it has been recorded from Alabama, Alberta, Arizona, Arkansas, British Columbia, California, Florida, Illinois, Indiana, Kansas, Kentucky, Louisiana, Maine, Maryland, Mississippi, North Carolina, Oklahoma, Quebec, South Carolina, Tennessee, Texas and West Virginia.

The forewings are dark greyish brown, but white along the posterior margin, the line between the two colours scalloped, or rather the white portion sends two or three teeth or processes into the brownish part, one of which is just before the cilia and is opposite to a costal white streak. The dorsal cilia are dusky silvery dusted with dark brown. The hindwings are pale yellowish fuscous.

The larvae feed on Prunus americana.
