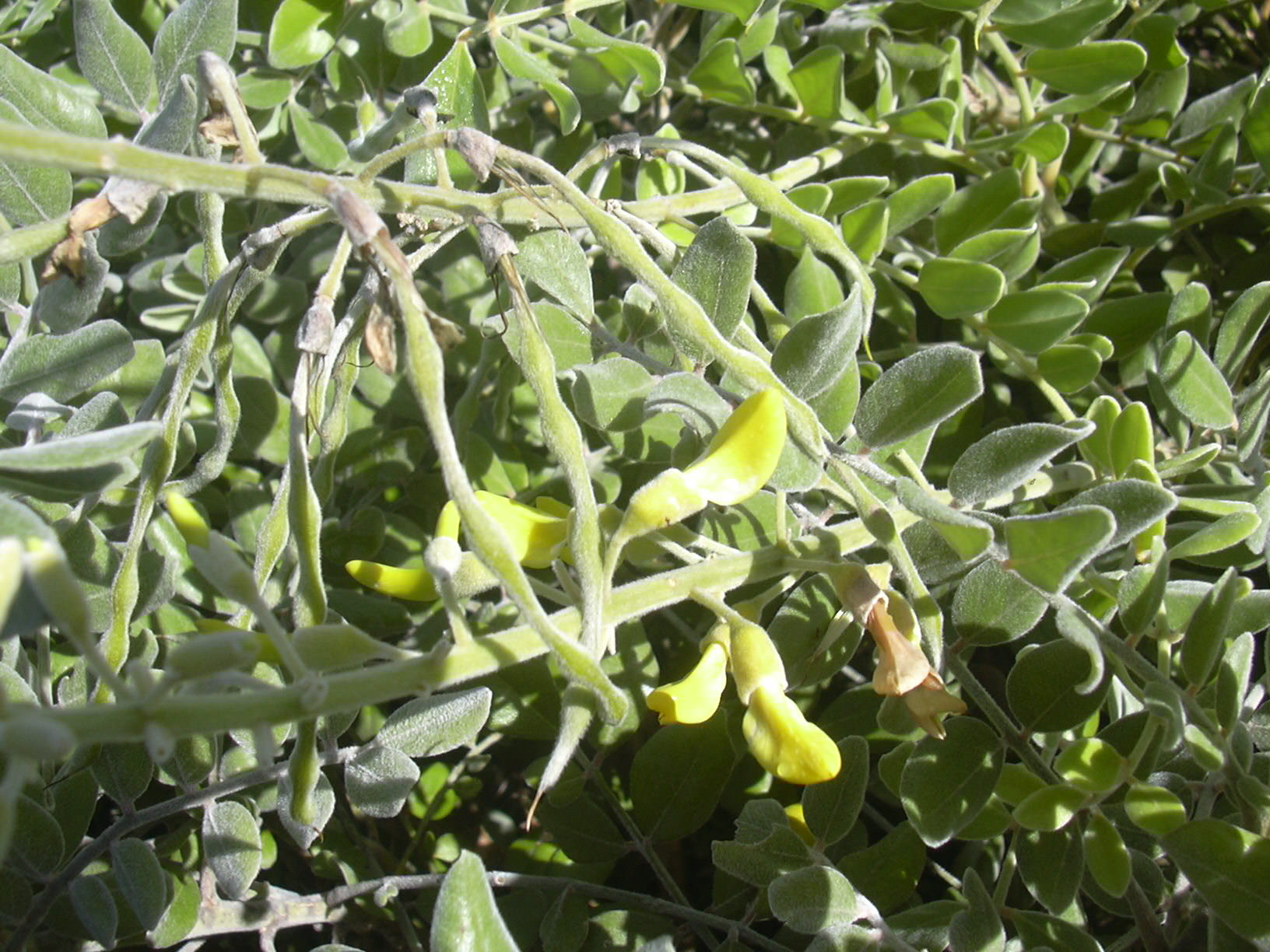

Scientific classification
- Kingdom: Plantae
- Clade: Tracheophytes
- Clade: Angiosperms
- Clade: Eudicots
- Clade: Rosids
- Order: Fabales
- Family: Fabaceae
- Subfamily: Faboideae
- Genus: Sophora
- Species: S. tomentosa

Binomial name
- Sophora tomentosa L.

Synonyms
- Sophora fometosa L. [Spelling variant]; Sophora tomentosa f. aurea Yakovlev; Sophora tomentosa f. longifolia Yakovlev; Sophora tometosa L. [Spelling variant]; Sorindeia goudotii Briq.

= Sophora tomentosa =

Species of plant

Sophora tomentosa, commonly known as necklacepod, yellow necklacepod, and occasionally referred to as silver bush, is a pantropical shrub or small tree in the Fabaceae family. It typically grows 4 to 10 feet tall and is often found in coastal conditions and near wetlands. The name Necklacepod is derived from the characteristic string of seed pods that develop after its yellow flowers germinate into seeds.

Necklacepod is a nectar plant for bees, butterflies, and in parts of the Americas hummingbirds as well. It is suggested for use by native plant enthusiasts in Florida as a good landscape plant for xeriscaping but it only naturally occurs in coastal counties in the central and southern part of the state, while closely related varieties occur in Texas, and the Caribbean. The variety of Necklacepod growing in Australia is considered an endangered species in some areas due to the clearing of coastal habitat and displacement by invasive species.

In Sri Lanka, the plant is known as moodu murunga. The inedible pod has some similarities to the murunga (drumstick) pod. It has been used to make fish poisons, insect and spider repellents, especially in Africa.

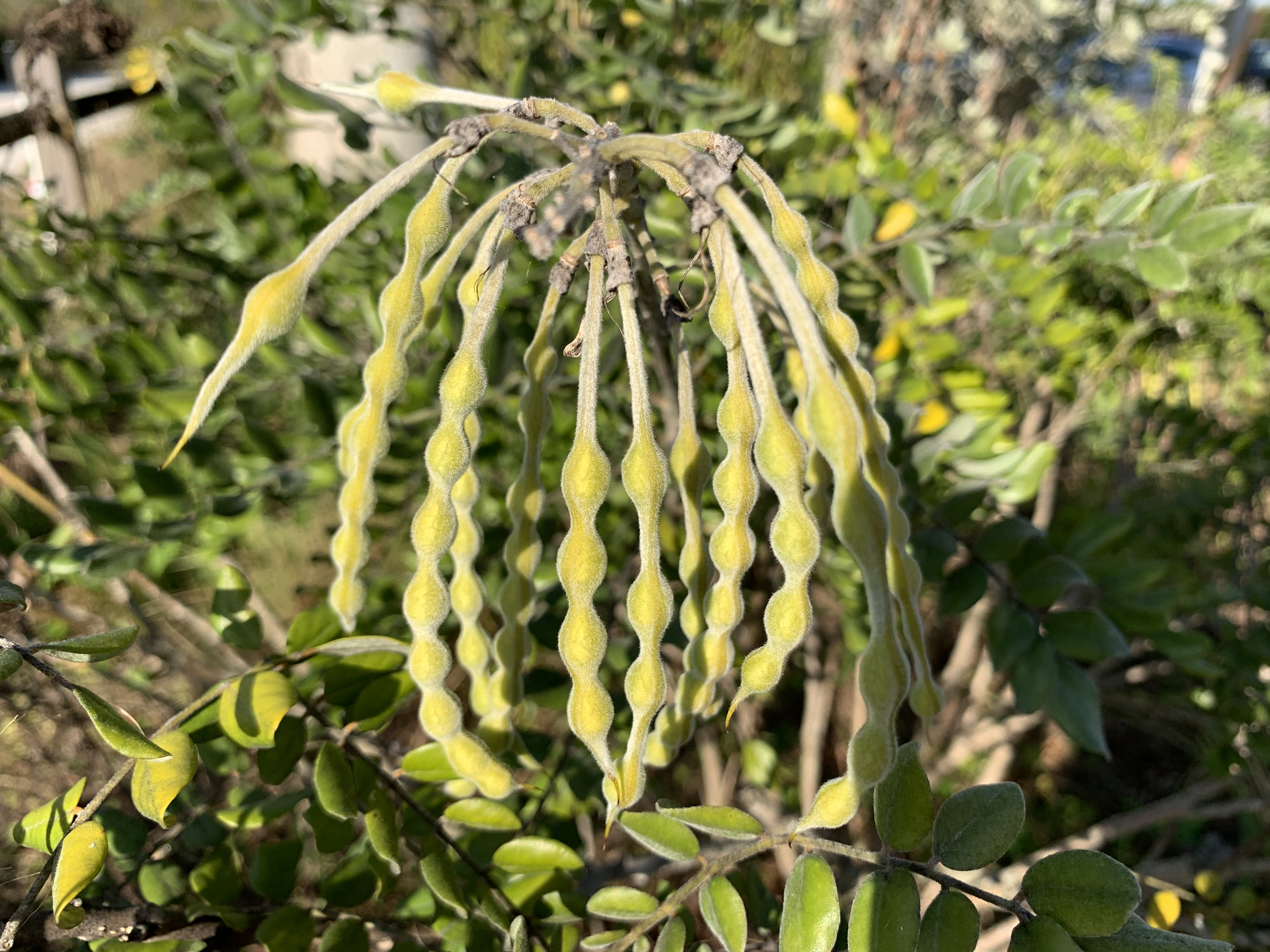
Seed pods
