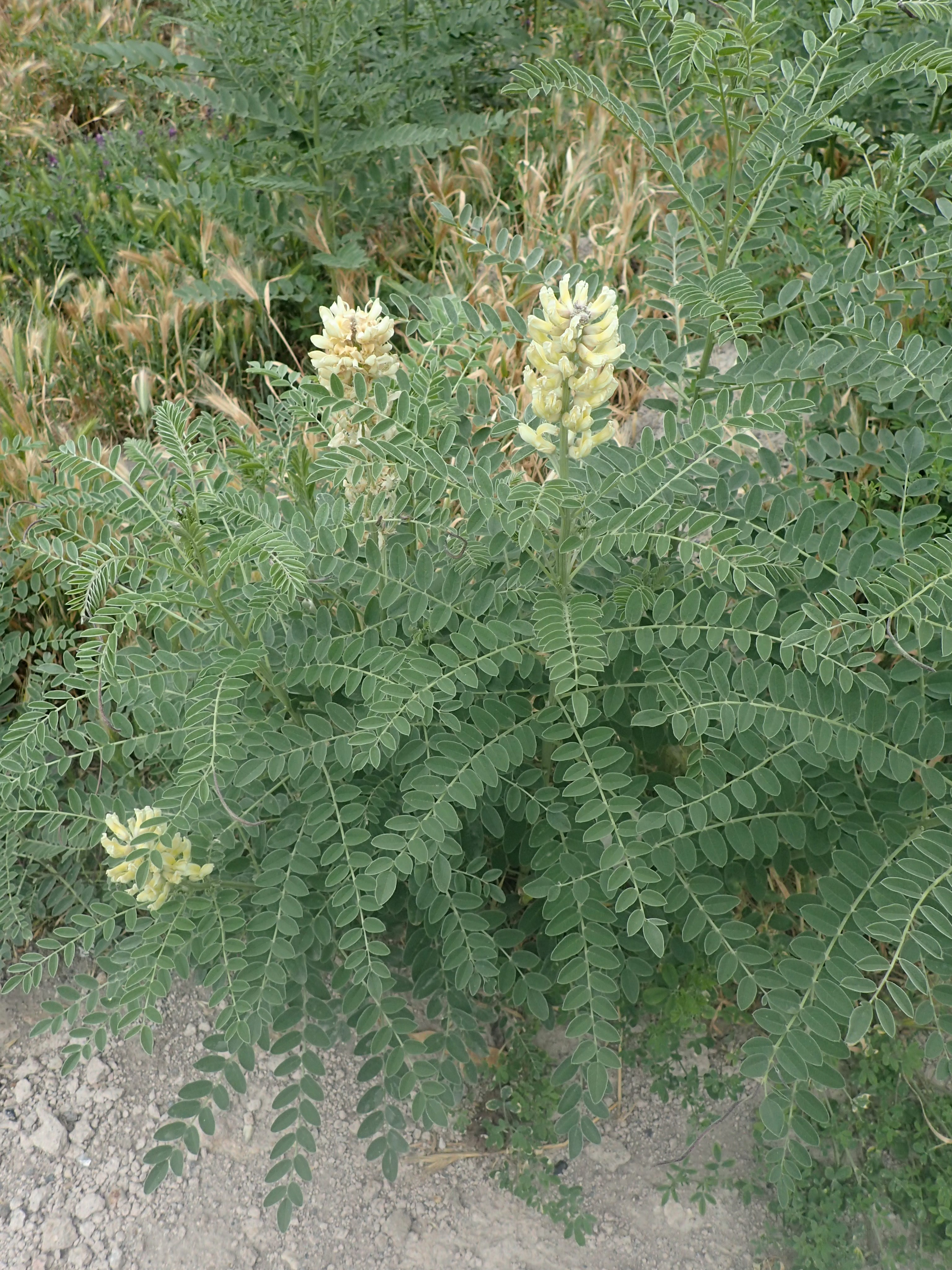
- Habit

Scientific classification
- Kingdom: Plantae
- Clade: Embryophytes
- Clade: Tracheophytes
- Clade: Spermatophytes
- Clade: Angiosperms
- Clade: Eudicots
- Clade: Rosids
- Order: Fabales
- Family: Fabaceae
- Subfamily: Faboideae
- Genus: Sophora
- Species: S. alopecuroides

Binomial name
- Sophora alopecuroides L.

Synonyms
- List: Goebelia alopecuroides (L.) Bunge ex Boiss.; Goebelia alopecuroides var. tomentosa Boiss.; Pseudosophora alopecuroides (L.) Sweet; Radiusia alopecuroides (L.) Endl.; Sophora albicans J.St.-Hil.; Sophora alopecuroides subsp. tomentosa (Boiss.) Ponert; Sophora orientalis Pall.; Sophora pallida Salisb.; Vexibia alopecuroides (L.) Yakovlev

= Sophora alopecuroides =

Species of plant

Sophora alopecuroides is a widespread species of flowering plant in the family Fabaceae. It is native to the steppes and desert margins of Eurasia. A perennial shrub reaching 1 m (3 ft), it is used in traditional Chinese medicine.

== Subtaxa ==
The following varieties are accepted:

- Sophora alopecuroides var. alopecuroides – Crimea, eastern and southern European Russia, Transcaucasus, Altai, western and central Asia, Pakistan, western Himalayas, Mongolia, and China (except south-central and Manchuria), and introduced to Ukraine, western Siberia
- Sophora alopecuroides var. tomentosa (Boiss.) Bornm. – Iraq, Iran, Afghanistan, Pakistan, Xinjiang
