= Gennady Yakovlev =

Russian botanist (1938–2024)

Yakovlev in 2016

Gennady Pavlovich Yakovlev (Russian: Геннадий Павлович Яковлев; 7 June 1938 – 12 January 2024) was a Russian botanist, pharmacognosist, phytochemist. He was a director of Saint-Petersburg State Chemical-Pharmaceutical Academy (1992–2004), and an expert in Fabaceae taxonomy. Yakovlev died on 12 January 2024, at the age of 85.

== Plants authored by G. P. Yakovlev ==
- Acosmium panamense (Benth.) Yakovlev
- Chamaecrista takhtajanii Barreto et Yakovlev
- Calia conzatti (Stanley) Yakovlev (Styphnolobium conzatti Sousa; Rudd)
- Sophora gibbosa Yakovlev(S. gibbosa O.Kuntze as cited by Tsong and Ma 1981)
- Sophora tomentosa subsp australis Yakovlev

== Works ==
- Заметки по систематике и географии рода Sophora L. и близких родов. [Zametki po sistematike i geographii roda Sophora L. i blizkikh rodov. Systematical and geographical studies of genus Sophora L. and allied genera] // Труды Ленинградского химико-фармацевтического института. 1967 21: 42-62.
- Yakovlev, G.P.; Syrovezhko, N.V. (1967). [Nekotorye osobennosti stroeniyasemyan roda Sophora L. i blizkikh k nemu rodov v svyazi s ikh sistematikoi i filogeniei] Trudy Leningradskogo khimico-farmacevticheskogo instituta. 21:90-98.
- Yakovlev, G.P.; O.A. Svyazeva. 1987. Zametki o vidakh sektsii Caragana roda Caragana Lam. (Fabaceae) Novosti syst. Vyssh. Rast. 24:126
- Yakovlev G.P.; Sytin A.K.; Roskov Yu.R. 1996. Legumes of Northern Eurasia. A checklist. Published by Royal Botanic Gardens Kew., 482-503
