= Cytisine =

Chemical compound

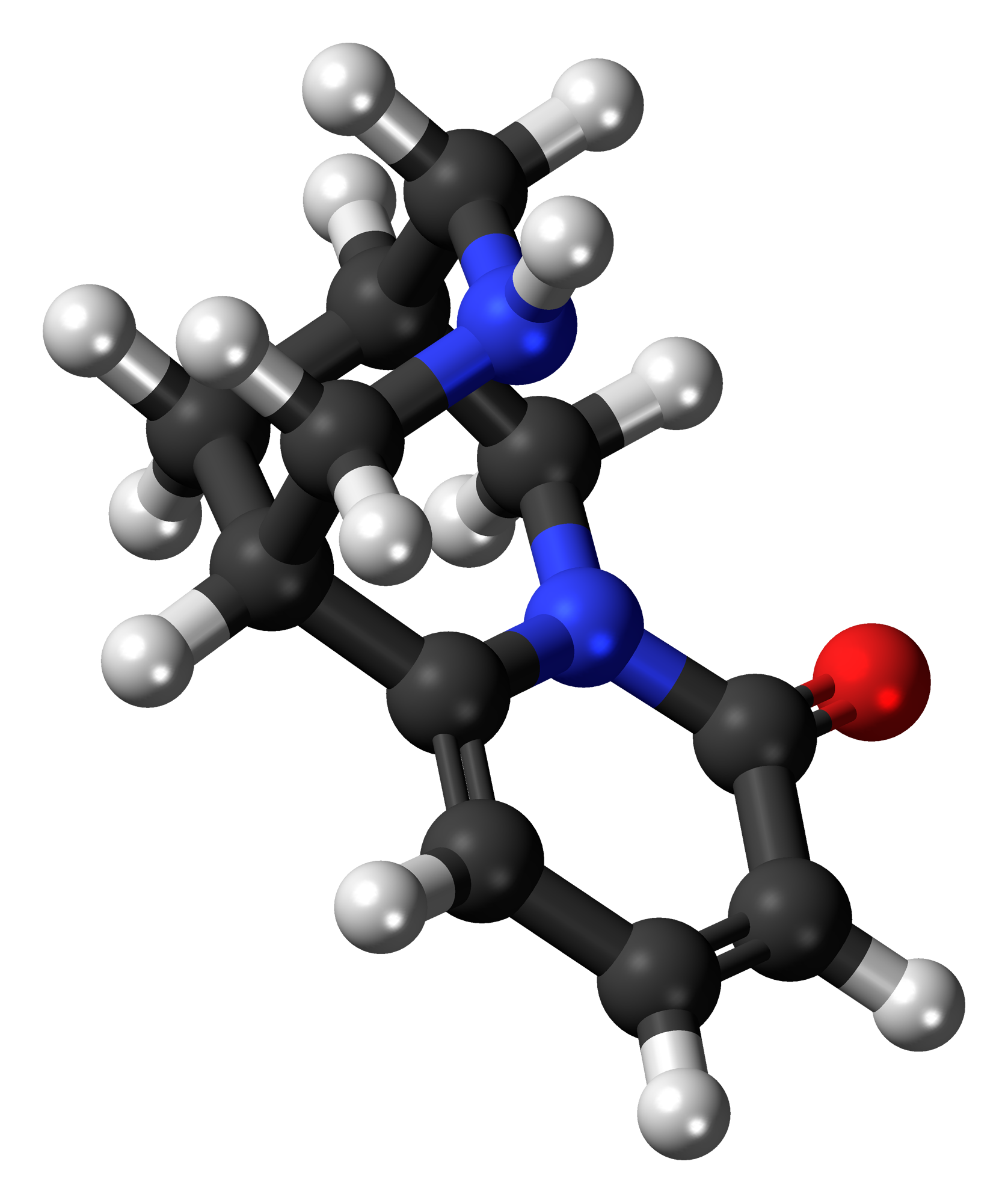

Clinical data
- Trade names: TBX-Free
- Other names: Cytisine; baptitoxine; sophorine
- License data: US DailyMed: Cytisine
- Routes of administration: By mouth
- Drug class: Nicotinic acetylcholine receptor partial agonist
- ATC code: N07BA04 (WHO)

Identifiers
- IUPAC name: (1R,5S)-1,2,3,4,5,6-hexahydro-8H-1,5-methanopyrido[1,2-a][1,3]diazocin-8-one
- CAS Number: 485-35-8
- PubChem CID: 10235
- IUPHAR/BPS: 5347
- DrugBank: DB09028
- ChemSpider: 9818
- UNII: 53S5U404NU
- ChEBI: CHEBI:4055
- ChEMBL: ChEMBL497939
- CompTox Dashboard (EPA): DTXSID00883395
- ECHA InfoCard: 100.006.924

Chemical and physical data
- Formula: C_{11}H_{14}N_{2}O
- Molar mass: 190.246 g·mol^{−1}
- 3D model (JSmol): Interactive image
- Melting point: 152 °C (306 °F)
- Boiling point: 218 °C (424 °F)
- SMILES: O=C1/C=C\C=C2/N1C[C@@H]3CNC[C@H]2C3
- InChI: InChI=1S/C11H14N2O/c14-11-3-1-2-10-9-4-8(5-12-6-9)7-13(10)11/h1-3,8-9,12H,4-7H2/t8-,9+/m0/s1; Key:ANJTVLIZGCUXLD-DTWKUNHWSA-N

Cytisine, also known as baptitoxine, cytisinicline, or sophorine, is an alkaloid that occurs naturally in several plant genera, such as Laburnum and Cytisus of the family Fabaceae. It was first reported in 1865 and has been used medically to help with smoking cessation. It has been found effective in several randomized clinical trials, including in the United States and New Zealand, and is being investigated in additional trials in the United States and a non-inferiority trial in Australia in which it is being compared head-to-head with the smoking cessation aid varenicline (sold in the United States as Chantix). It has also been used entheogenically via mescalbeans by some Native American groups, historically in the Rio Grande Valley predating even peyote.

Cytisine is on the World Health Organization's List of Essential Medicines.

== Uses ==
=== Smoking cessation ===
Cytisine has been available in post-Soviet states as an aid to smoking cessation under the brand name Tabex from the Bulgarian pharmaceutical company Sopharma AD. In 1961, Bulgarian pharmacist Strashimir Ingilizov synthesized Tabex using the alkaloid Cytisine which was derived from the seeds of the yellow acacia (Cytisus laburnum), a European decorative shrub prevalent in Bulgaria and commonly referred to as "golden rain". It was first marketed in Bulgaria in 1964 and then became widely available in the Soviet Union. In Poland, it is sold under the brand name Desmoxan, and it is also available in Canada under the brand name Cravv.

In June 2026, the U.S. Food and Drug Administration issued a complete response letter for Achieve Life Sciences' application to market cytisinicline for smoking cessation, citing deficiencies at a third-party manufacturing facility and unfinished product labeling.

Its molecular structure has some similarity to that of nicotine, and it has similar pharmacological effects. Like the smoking cessation aid varenicline, cytisine is a partial agonist of nicotinic acetylcholine receptors (nAChRs). Cytisine has a short half-life of 4.8 hours. As a result, the extract provides smokers with satisfaction similar to smoking a cigarette, alleviating the urge to smoke and reducing the severity of nicotine withdrawal symptoms, while also reducing the reward experience of any cigarettes smoked.

In 2011, a randomized controlled trial with 740 patients found cytisine improved 12-month abstinence from nicotine from 2.4% with placebo to 8.4% with cytisine. A 2013 meta-analysis of eight studies demonstrated that cytisine has similar effectiveness to varenicline but with substantially lower side effects. A 2014 systematic review and economic evaluation concluded that cytisine was more likely to be cost-effective for smoking cessation than varenicline.

It is on the World Health Organization's List of Essential Medicines.

=== Recreational ===
Plants containing cytisine, including the scotch broom and mescalbean, have also been used recreationally. Positive effects are reported to include a nicotine-like intoxication.

=== Reagent for organic chemistry ===
(−)-Cytisine extracted from Laburnum anagyroides seeds was used as a starting material for the preparation of "(+)-sparteine surrogate", for the preparation of enantiomerically enriched lithium anions of opposite stereochemistry to those anions obtained from sparteine.

== Sources ==
Cytisine is extracted from the seeds of Cytisus laburnum L. (golden rain acacia), and is found in several genera of the subfamily Faboideae of the family Fabaceae, including Laburnum, Anagyris, Thermopsis, Cytisus, Genista, Retama and Sophora. Cytisine is thought to also be present in Gymnocladus of the subfamily Caesalpinioideae, although this has not been proven.

== Toxicity ==
Cytisine has been found to interfere with breathing and cause death in test mice; LD_{50} i.v. in mice is about 2 mg/kg. Cytisine is also teratogenic.

Māmane (Sophora chrysophylla) can contain amounts of cytisine that are lethal to most animals. The palila (Loxioides bailleui, a bird), Uresiphita polygonalis virescens and Cydia species (moths), and possibly sheep and goats are not affected by the toxin for various reasons, and consume māmane, or parts of it, as food. U. p. virescens caterpillars are possibly able to sequester the cytisine to give themselves protection from predation; they have aposematic coloration which would warn off potential predators.
