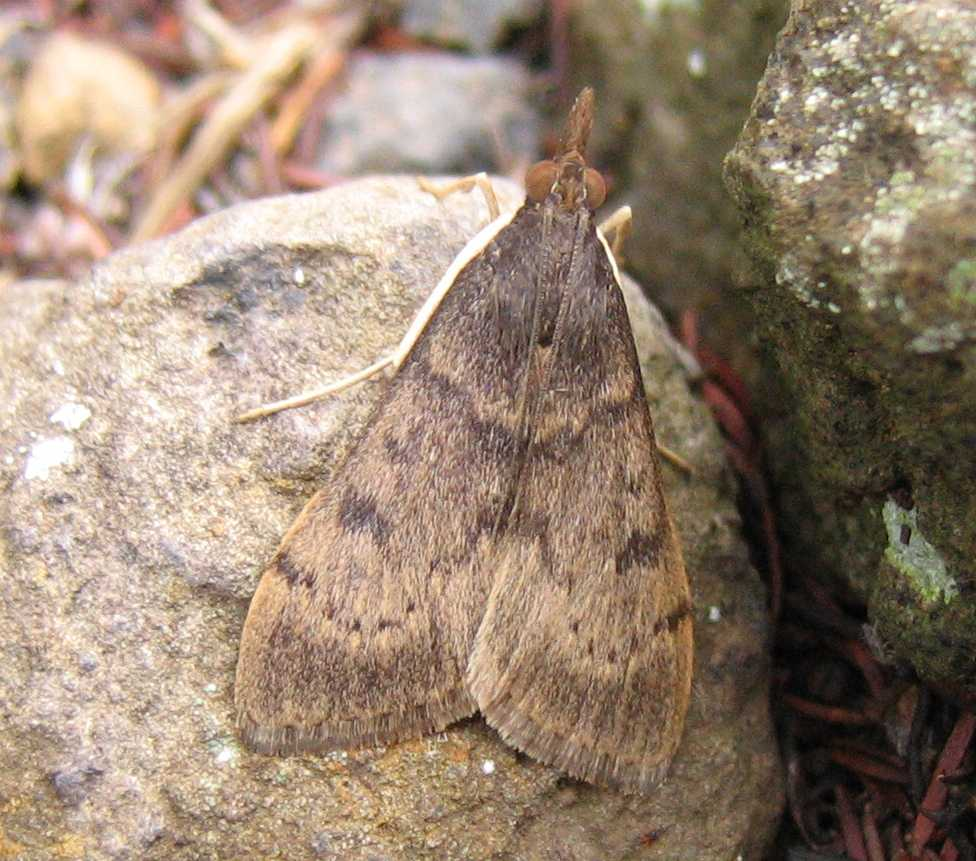

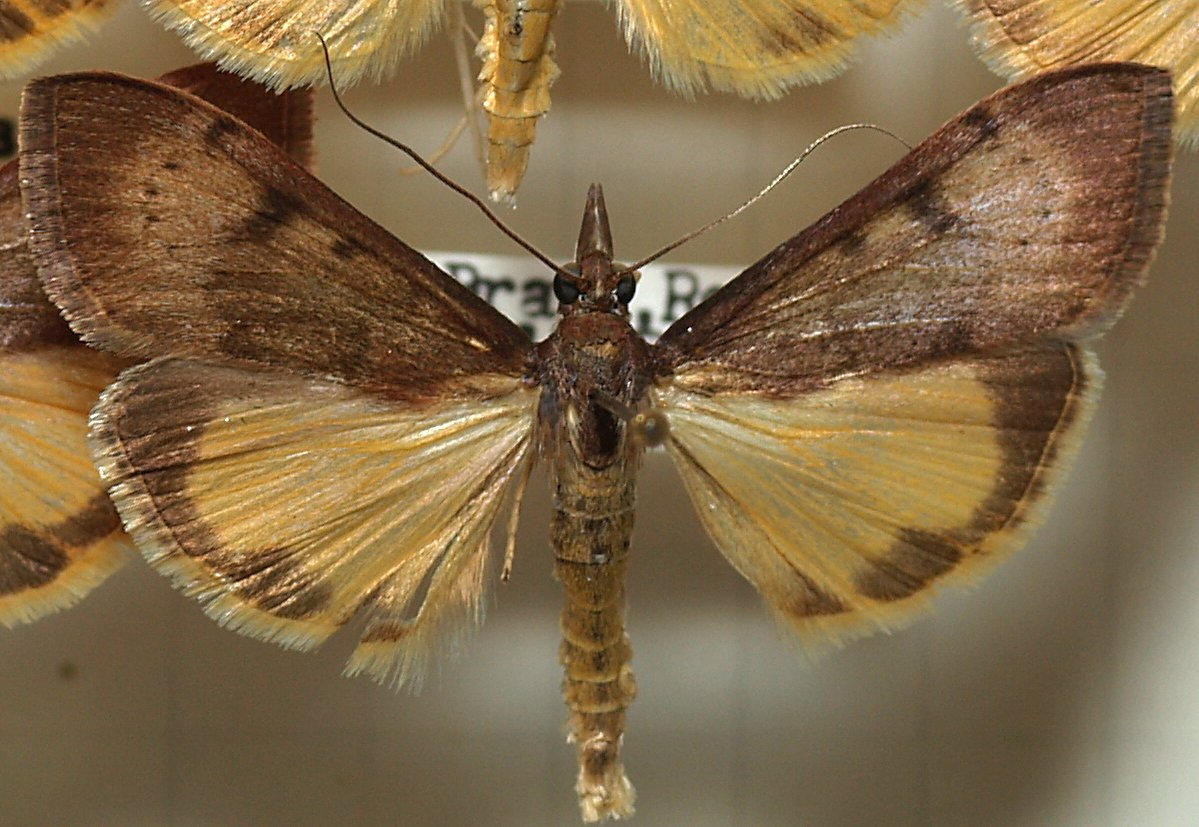

Scientific classification
- Kingdom: Animalia
- Phylum: Arthropoda
- Class: Insecta
- Order: Lepidoptera
- Family: Crambidae
- Genus: Uresiphita
- Species: U. gilvata

Binomial name
- Uresiphita gilvata (Fabricius, 1794)

Synonyms
- Phalaena gilvata Fabricius, 1794; Mecyna gilvata; Mecyna polygonalis; Uresiphita limbalis Denis & Schiffermüller, 1775 (nec Linnaeus, 1767); Pyralis polygonalis Denis & Schiffermuller, 1775; Pyralis diversalis Hubner, 1796; Pyralis rusticalis Hubner, 1796; Botys polygonalis var. meridionalis Wocke, 1871; Mecyna deprivalis Walker, 1859; Uresiphita polygonalis carbonalis (Caradja, 1939); Mecyna aversalis Guenée, 1854; Uresiphita gilvata virescens (Butler, 1881)

= Uresiphita gilvata =

Species of moth

Uresiphita gilvata is a moth of the family Crambidae. It was first described by Johan Christian Fabricius in 1794 and is found in Europe and North Africa.

The wingspan is 29–37 mm. The forewing is greyish to light brown sometimes whitish bands either side of the median area (sometimes obsolete). The hindwing is pale or bright yellow with a black margin. The lines vary from faint to clear. The postmedian line is undulating and the antemedian line is almost straight.

Adults are on wing from September to October depending on the location.

The larvae feed on various low-growing herbaceous plants, including Genista, Cytisus and Ulex.

It is listed as a synonym of Uresiphita polygonalis by some sources.
