= Kauaʻi palila =

Kauaʻi palila Temporal range: Holocene

Conservation status
- Extinct (Early 1700s)

Scientific classification
- Kingdom: Animalia
- Phylum: Chordata
- Class: Aves
- Order: Passeriformes
- Family: Fringillidae
- Subfamily: Carduelinae
- Genus: Loxioides
- Species: †L. kikuchi

Binomial name
- †Loxioides kikuchi (James and Olson, 2006)

Extinct species of bird

The Kauaʻi palila or Pila's palila (Loxioides kikuchi) is an extinct species of Hawaiian finch that was much larger than the palila (Loxioides bailleui). It was described from subfossil remains discovered at the Makauwahi Cave on the south coast of Kauaʻi in the Hawaiian Islands.

== Extinction ==
The Kauaʻi palila was one of many native Hawaiian birds that was affected by drastic changes in the environment due to farming. The dry forest was cut down, and irrigation from streams became widespread. The ecosystem became much wetter, and the remaining naio (Myoporum sandwicense) trees began to rot away. Soon Pila's palila was pushed to its limit, and became extinct, though it had lived for a long time, despite human competition and destruction of their habitat. Some speculate that the latest remaining specimen dates back to the 1800s. Today the Kauaʻi palila is known from a few specimens, found on the island of Kauaʻi. The Hawai'ian name of this bird is unknown, since it seems to have disappeared before Europeans arrived to record the name.
