= Palila v. Hawaii Department of Land and Natural Resources =

US ecological court case in 1981

- Court: United States Court of Appeals for the Ninth Circuit
- Full case name: Palila, (Psittirostra bailleui), an endangered species et al. v. Hawaii Department of Land and Natural Resources et al.
- Decided: February 9, 1981
- Citation: Case Citations Case Report

Court membership
- Judges sitting: Otto Richard Skopil, Jr. (head judge), Betty Binns Fletcher, Harry Pregerson

Keywords
- Endangered Species Act; Palila; Hawaii Department of Land and Natural Resources; Earthjustice

Palila v. Hawaii Department of Land and Natural Resources was an ecological court case pertaining to the Palila and the Māmane-Naio ecosystem of Mauna Kea. The case stems from the introduction of goats and sheep onto Hawaiʻi island in the late 18th century, which became feral and damaged the local ecosystem. Before the 1920s elimination program was completed, it was replaced with a game control plan that caused controversy between hunters and conservationists. Claiming that the state of Hawaii was violating the Endangered Species Act, a suit was filed to the Ninth District Court; as a result, the state was ordered to eradicate all feral animals on the island within two years. A public hunting program was put in place and has been largely effective; the Palila has begun to recover, and the case demonstrated federal power to protect endangered species.

== Roots ==
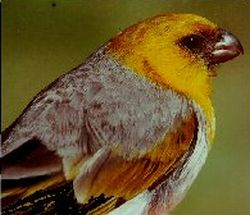
Palila (Loxioides bailleui) perched on a mamane tree in Hawaiʻi.

The roots of the case go as far back as the late 18th century, when goats (Capra hircus) and sheep (Ovis aries) were released on the island and became feral. They were highly damaging to the endemic ecosystem (especially Palila (Loxioides bailleui), which became critically endangered), and competed with commercial livestock for resources. A government program for their elimination was put in place in the late 1920s. The numbers were reduced from an estimated 40,000 to 200 in 1950. However, they were not fully eradicated; an increase in leisure time and greater ease of access to the mountains drove an influx of hunters who saw the remaining feral species as game animals. The Hawaii Department of Land and Natural Resources conceded, and in place of the eradication program a sustained-control program was introduced. This was followed by introducing feral mouflon (Ovis aries orientalis) onto the island for hunters.

In addition to mouflon, axis deer (Axis axis) were proposed for introduction. This was met with protests against their introduction by farmers and ranchers, who saw them as a threat to food resources and a vehicle for bovine disease. The hunting industry fought back, and the back-and-forth between the ranching industry and hunters eventually gave way to a rise in public environmental concern; reports were published that showed that there was no environmentally sustainable way the deer could be introduced onto the island, and the issue was finally laid to rest.

With conservationists demanding protection of Mauna Kea's ecosystem, plans were made to fence off 25% of the forests from foreign influence and leave the remaining 75% under the same regulations. This plan was met by extreme opposition from conservationists, who questioned the effectiveness of such a plan as well as where the money for the fence, an expensive project, would be found. While the land was partitioned as planned, no money was allocated for the building of the fence. During these wranglings, the federal Endangered Species Act was passed. The National Audubon Society and Sierra Club Legal Defense Fund filed a lawsuit against the Hawaii Department of Land and Natural Resources, claiming that they were violating federal laws of conservation.

== Hearings ==
=== Basis ===
The arguments of Palila et al. were based on wording in the Endangered Species Act that extended protection to "critical habitats...the loss of which would appreciably decrease the likelihood of the survival and recovery of the listed species." These arguments were centered on the Palila, an endemic species of finch-billed Hawaiian honeycreeper. Because of deforestation, the Palila, which used to range on Mauna Kea, Mauna Loa, and Hualālai, had its range cut to limited areas of Mauna Kea representing just 10% of its former range. A mass of records, reports, and studies had been amassed, all pointing to the feral game animals as the main perpetrator of the species' endangerment, and all recommending their total removal from the mountainside. In 1977 the species was included by the US Department of the Interior in a list of 10 extremely endangered animals. The defense argued that the game animals were no threat to the species, and that the Tenth Amendment gives states the power to control non-migratory birds within their own borders.

=== Results ===
The district court found the state violated the ESA and ordered it to initiate steps towards the removal of feral sheep from the island within two years. Plans were approved for the eradication of the feral animals through a public hunting campaign. A request for appeal by the state was denied.

== Outcome ==
There were several important outcomes from the legal debate:

1. It established the right to protection of endangered animals to human conventions that damage the ecosystems which they live on.
2. It showed that the federal government has over-reaching power in what was prior an internal state matter.
3. The ability of endangered species to have standing to sue as plaintiffs in their own right was not questioned. (The trial court's opinion began, "The Palila (Psittirostra bailleui) seeks the protection of this Court . . . ." The appellate court did not object.)

While the Palila has been rescued from extinction hundreds of Hawaiian ecosystems and organisms remain in danger, and it is likely there will be a similar debate on similar topics in the future.

== See also ==
- Hawaiian honeycreeper conservation
