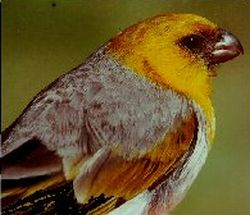
- Palila (L. bailleui)

Scientific classification
- Kingdom: Animalia
- Phylum: Chordata
- Class: Aves
- Order: Passeriformes
- Family: Fringillidae
- Subfamily: Carduelinae
- Genus: Loxioides; Oustalet, 1877

Type species
- Loxioides bailleui Oustalet, 1877

Species
- Loxioides bailleui; †Loxioides kikuichi

= Loxioides =

Genus of birds

Loxioides is a genus of Hawaiian honeycreeper, in the subfamily Carduelinae.

The birds are endemic to Hawaii.

== Species ==
The genus Loxioides contains the following two species, one extant and one extinct:

Image	Common name	Scientific name
	Palila	Loxioides bailleui Oustalet, 1877
	†Kauaʻi palila	†Loxioides kikuichi James & Olson, 2006. Prehistoric; possibly survived to the early 18th century.

== See also ==
- Hawaiian honeycreepers
- Birds of Hawaii
