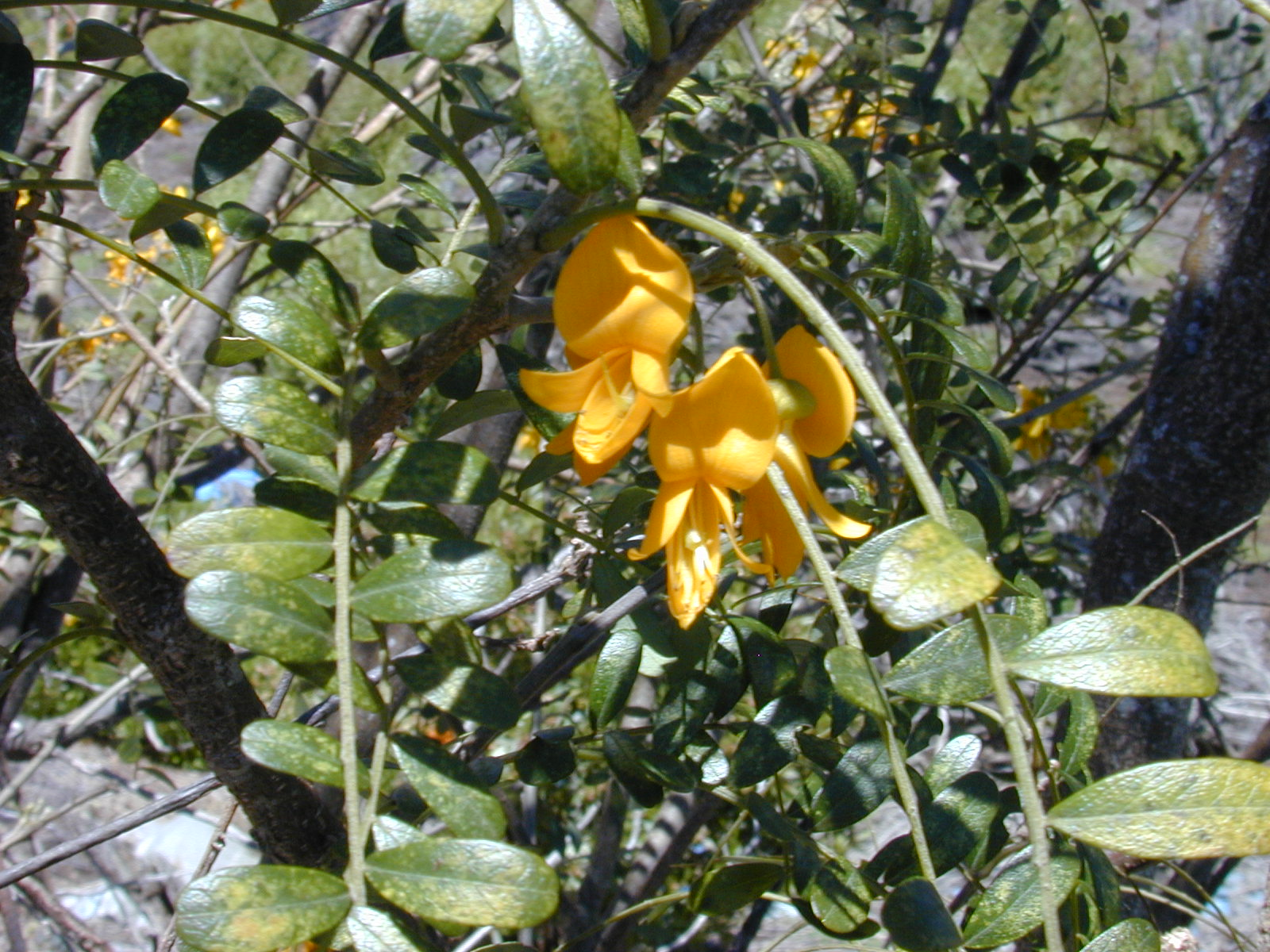

Scientific classification
- Kingdom: Plantae
- Clade: Tracheophytes
- Clade: Angiosperms
- Clade: Eudicots
- Clade: Rosids
- Order: Fabales
- Family: Fabaceae
- Subfamily: Faboideae
- Genus: Sophora
- Species: S. chrysophylla

Binomial name
- Sophora chrysophylla (Salisb.) Seem.

Synonyms
- Edwardsia chrysophylla Salisb.

= Sophora chrysophylla =

Species of plant

Sophora chrysophylla, known as māmane in Hawaiian, is a species of flowering plant in the pea and bean family, Fabaceae, that is endemic to Hawaii. It is highly polymorphic, growing as a shrub or tree, and able to reach a height of 15 m (49 ft) in tree form. Yellow flowers are produced in winter and spring.

== Biology ==
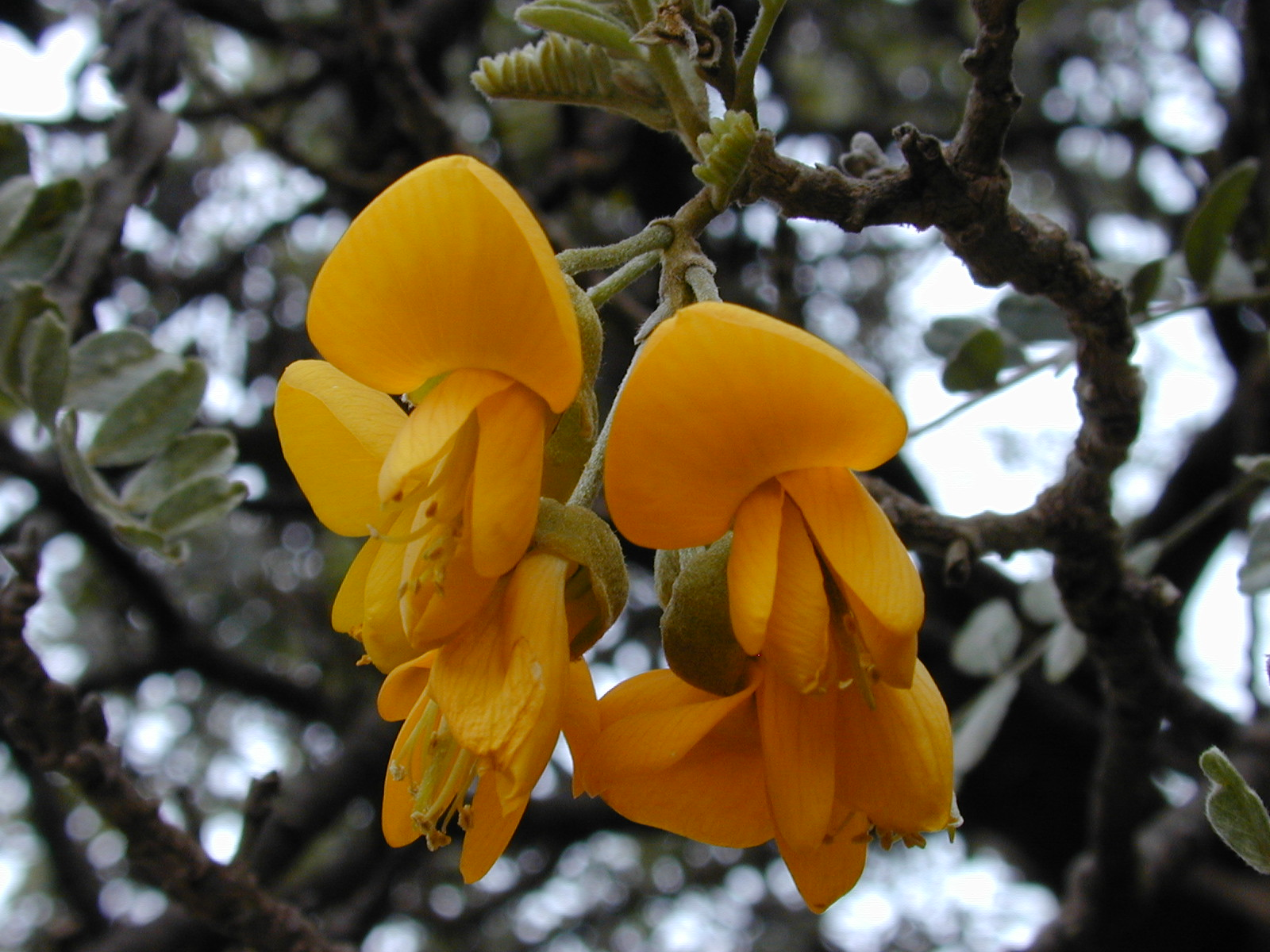
Sophora chrysophylla flowers

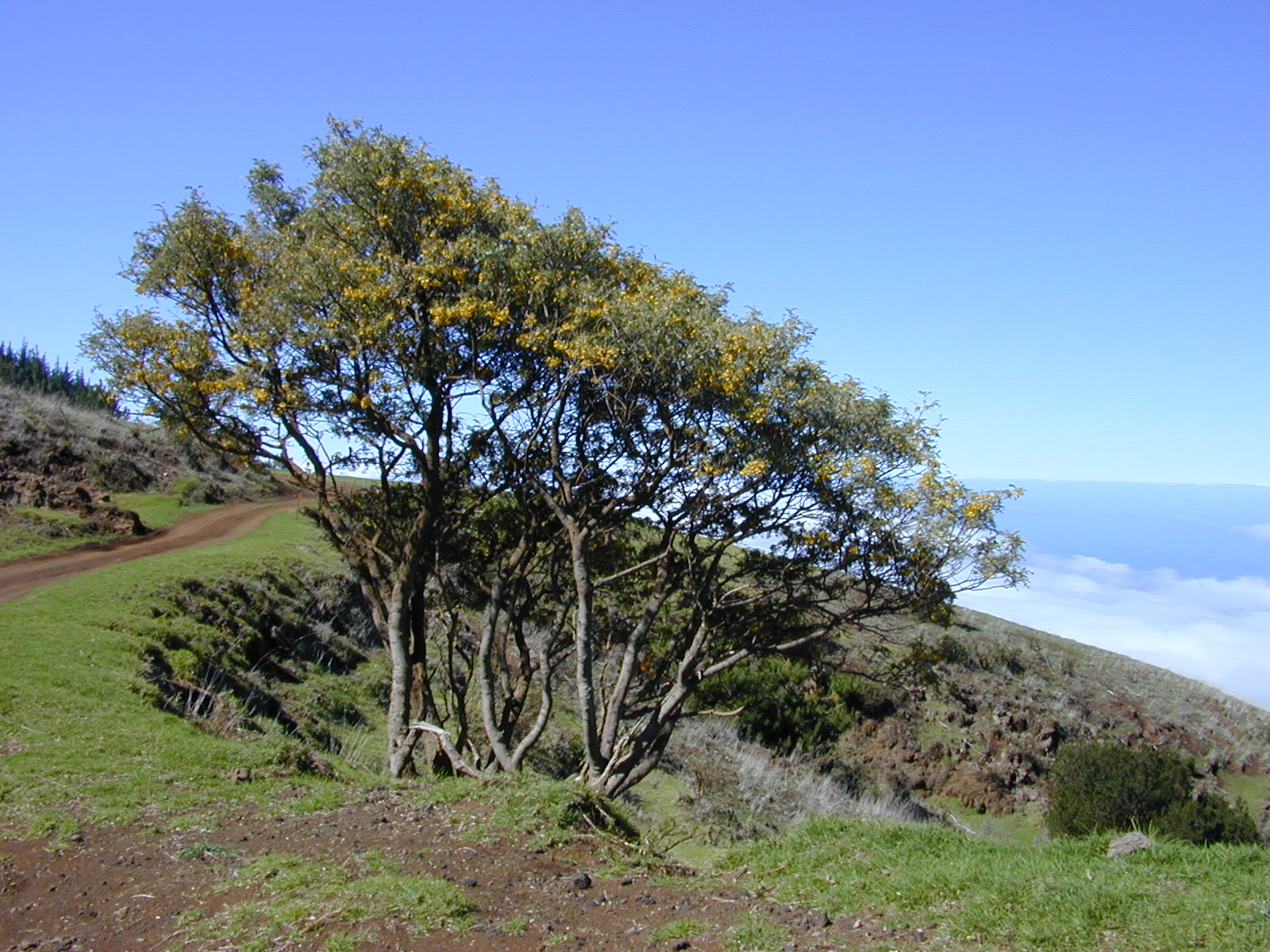
Māmane trees

S. chrysophylla has ridged golden brown branches. The tree has pinnately compound leaves with 6 to 10 pairs of leaflets. Each leaflet is 0.7 to 5 cm (0.28 to 1.97 in) long and 0.3 to 2.3 cm (0.12 to 0.91 in) wide. Leaves are smooth, or with gray or yellow hairs on the underside. The specific name is derived from the Greek words χρυσός (chrysós), meaning "gold," and Φύλλο (phyllo), meaning "leaf". Flowers are found at the bases of leaves or the ends of branches in clusters – that is, they occur in axillary or terminal racemes. The corolla is yellow. The petal size ranges from 11.5 to 21 mm (0.45 to 0.83 in) long, and 8 to 20 mm (0.31 to 0.79 in) wide.

The tree blooms in winter and spring. The height of the flowering season is in mid-spring. Māmane wood is dense, hard and durable. Seedpods are persistent, and remain on the tree for most of the year. They are twisted, brown to brownish-gray, have four wings and are 2 to 16 cm (0.79 to 6.30 in) long and usually 1.5 cm (0.59 in) wide. Seedpods are tightly constricted around the yellow-orange or brown to grayish-black seeds, which are 6.35 mm (0.250 in) long. Untreated, the seeds have germination rates of less than 5%. The tree is perennial and highly polymorphic.

== Habitat ==
Māmane is an endemic species of Hawaii, and can be found on all main islands except Niʻihau and Kahoʻolawe. It inhabits low shrublands, high shrublands, dry forests, mixed mesic forests, and, rarely, wet forests. It can grow at elevations of 30–2,900 m (98–9,514 ft), being limited by the tree line. Māmane is most common and grows the tallest in montane dry forests at elevations of 1,220–2,440 m (4,000–8,010 ft). Māmane and naio (Myoporum sandwicense) define a dry woodland ecotone on the subalpine areas of East Maui (Haleakalā) and the Island of Hawaiʻi.

== Uses ==
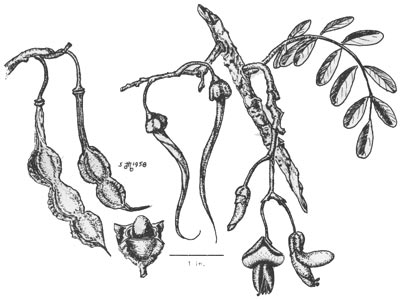
S. chrysophylla illustration

The hard, durable wood of māmane was used by the Native Hawaiians for pou (house posts) and kaola (beams) up to 5 cm (2.0 in) in diameter, ʻōʻō (digging sticks), spears, kope (spades), papa hōlua (sled) runners, papa olonā (Touchardia latifolia scrapers), ʻau koʻi (adze handles), and wahie (firewood). Cattle ranchers used it as fence posts.

In herbal medicine, the flowers are used as an astringent. The wood was also used in religious rituals to ward off evil. A kahuna nui (high priest) would wrap a piece of māmane wood in a dark kapa cloth and hold it up to symbolize authority.

Sophora chrysophylla contains the alkaloids Mamanine and Pohakuline.

== Ecology and conservation ==
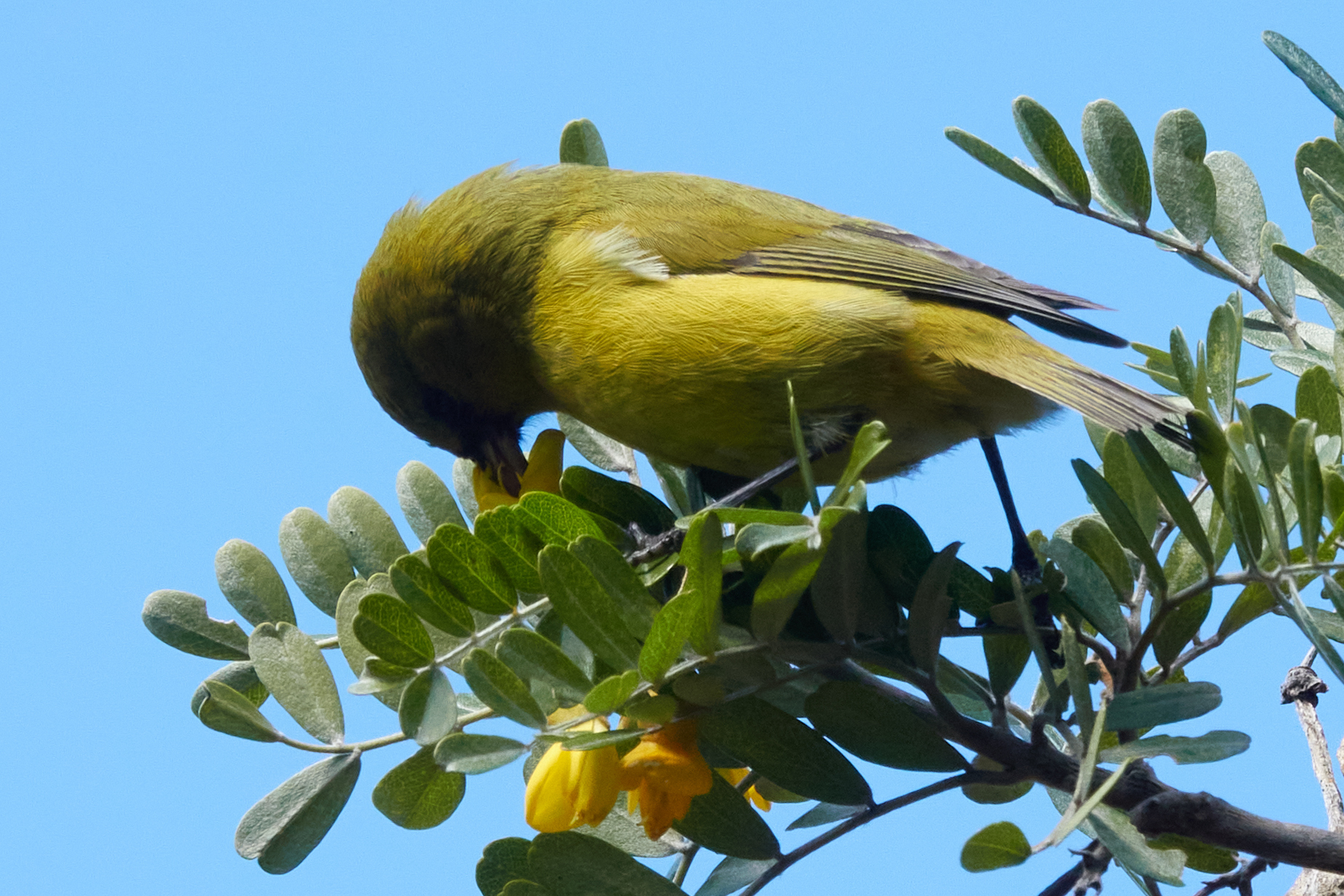
Maui ʻamakihi feeding on nectar

Māmane is essential for the endangered palila (Loxioides bailleui), which feeds almost exclusively on the plants' immature seeds when these are in season. It also nests in the māmane branches. Caterpillars of Cydia moths also eat the māmane's seeds, and in turn are eaten by the palila. Both the bird and the larvae utilize the embryo only, leaving the seed coat untouched.

To other animals, māmane seeds are highly poisonous. House finches die within minutes after eating the seeds. The māmane employs a two-layered biochemical defence system: The seed coats contain some 4% phenolic compounds, which give them a vile taste. They are also somewhat toxic and have a high fibre content. Seed predators trying to eat the seeds will probably not be killed but at least have a nasty experience. Should a predator be able to penetrate the seed coat, the embryo contains deadly quantities (>4% of dry weight) of quinolizidine alkaloids. The palila and the moths, however, have evolved the ability to deal with the poisonous compounds. The palila, for example, can deal with dozens of times the dose of cytisine that would kill a laboratory mouse. Both seed predators seem to be able to recognize and avoid the most poisonous trees. Cydia caterpillars are able to break up the toxic compounds. They do not sequester the alkaloids for their own use, but are found to contain about as much phenolic compounds as the seed coats do. This seems not to be sufficient to deter predators however as they are also cryptically colored. The palila is apparently impervious to the phenolic aroma (as they eat Cydia caterpillars which would smell and taste like the plant), discarding the seed coats due to their low nutritional value. How the palila deals with the toxins is not known.(Banko et al. 2002)

Feral goats and sheep voraciously eat the seedpods of the plant, negatively impacting the tree's population. Toxicity of the leaves is unknown; it is notable that Uresiphita polygonalis virescens caterpillars which feed on the leaves have aposematic coloration. Clearly, this issue requires further study. Ranch cattle can kill trees through stomping on the roots. Wildfire has also destroyed some of the trees, though it is generally resistant to fire, and can grow quickly after one occurs. As regards diseases, the canker ascomycete Botryosphaeria mamane causes witch's broom disease, which kills heavily infected trees (Gardner 1997). Māmane grows well in areas where there are no sheep or goats, and cattle populations are limited. The plant is being reforested in order to increase the population of both the tree itself and the palila, and revive the indigenous ecosystem.
