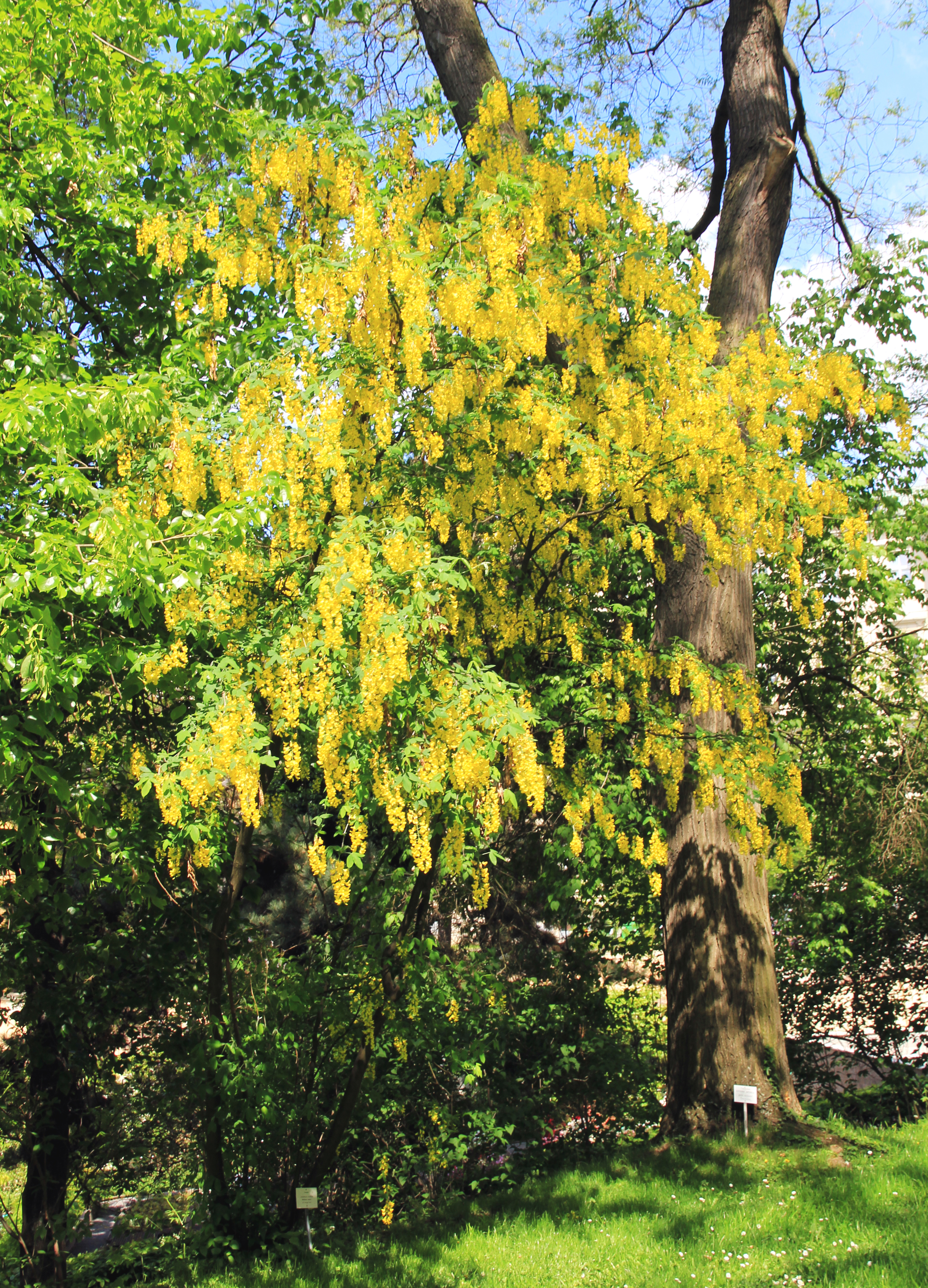

Scientific classification
- Kingdom: Plantae
- Clade: Embryophytes
- Clade: Tracheophytes
- Clade: Spermatophytes
- Clade: Angiosperms
- Clade: Eudicots
- Clade: Rosids
- Order: Fabales
- Family: Fabaceae
- Subfamily: Faboideae
- Genus: Laburnum
- Species: L. alpinum

Binomial name
- Laburnum alpinum J.Presl

= Laburnum alpinum =

Species of plant

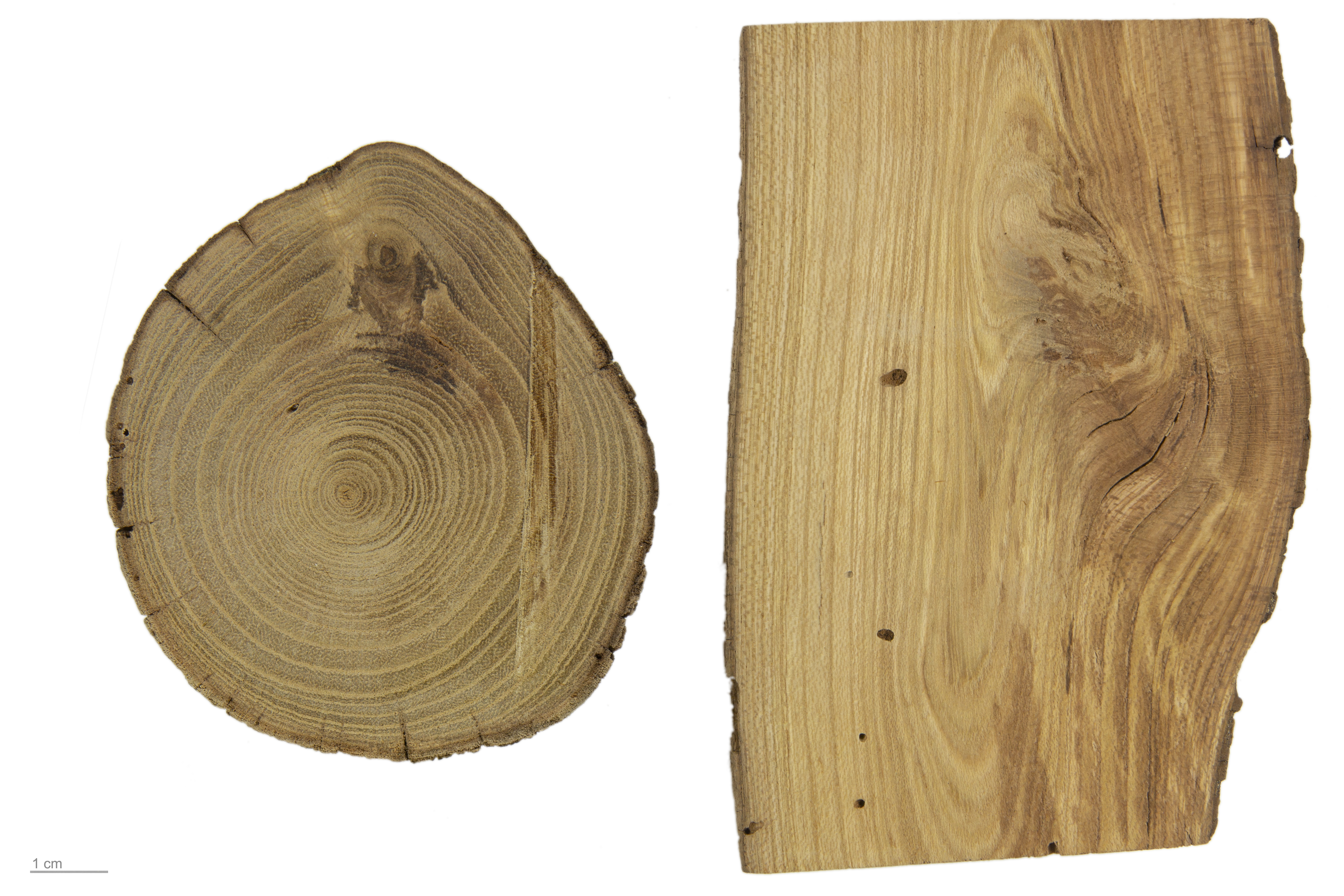
Laburnum alpinum (MHNT)

Laburnum alpinum, the Scotch laburnum, Scottish laburnum or alpine laburnum, is a leguminous (Leguminosae) deciduous tree.

== Description ==
Laburnum alpinum is similar to Laburnum anagyroides, it grows to 5 metres (16 ft) by 6 metres (20 ft), at a fast rate. It is hardy to zone 5.

It is in flower from May to June, and the seeds ripen from September to October. The panicles of vanilla scented, pea-like flowers are hermaphrodite (having both male and female organs) and are pollinated by insects.

The fruit is a pod or legume, the seeds green at first but becoming shiny black.

The leaves are cholagogue and purgative. All parts of this plant are poisonous if consumed in large enough quantities and should not be eaten or used internally.

== Distribution ==
It is native to Central and Southern Europe and has become naturalised in several parts of northern Britain. L. alpinium and L. anagyroides Medic. are both common as a garden escape in Northern Ireland.

== Cultivation ==
Laburnum alpinum is cultivated as an ornamental tree. Plants can be successfully transplanted even when quite large. The most common ornamental Laburnum plant is a hybrid of this species and Laburnum anagyroides, Laburnum × watereri.

The plant prefers well-drained, light (sandy), medium (loamy) soil but tolerates heavy clay and nutritionally poor soils. Preferring acid, neutral and basic (alkaline) soils, it can grow in semi-shade (light woodland) or full sun.

It can withstand strong winds but not maritime exposure, and tolerates atmospheric pollution. The plant is notably susceptible to honey fungus.

Laburnum has a symbiotic relationship with certain soil bacteria, these bacteria form nodules on the roots and fix atmospheric nitrogen. Some of this nitrogen is made available to the growing plant but some can also be used by other plants growing nearby.
