= Uresiphita insulicola =

Scientific classification
- Domain: Eukaryota
- Kingdom: Animalia
- Phylum: Arthropoda
- Class: Insecta
- Order: Lepidoptera
- Family: Crambidae
- Genus: Uresiphita
- Species: U. insulicola

Binomial name
- Uresiphita insulicola (Turner, 1918)

Synonyms
- Mecyna insulicola Turner, 1918

Species of moth

Uresiphita insulicola is a moth in the family Crambidae. It is found in Australia, where it has been recorded from Lord Howe Island, Norfolk Island and Queensland.

The wingspan is about 40 mm. The forewings are dark brown and the hindwings are orange with broad black tips.
