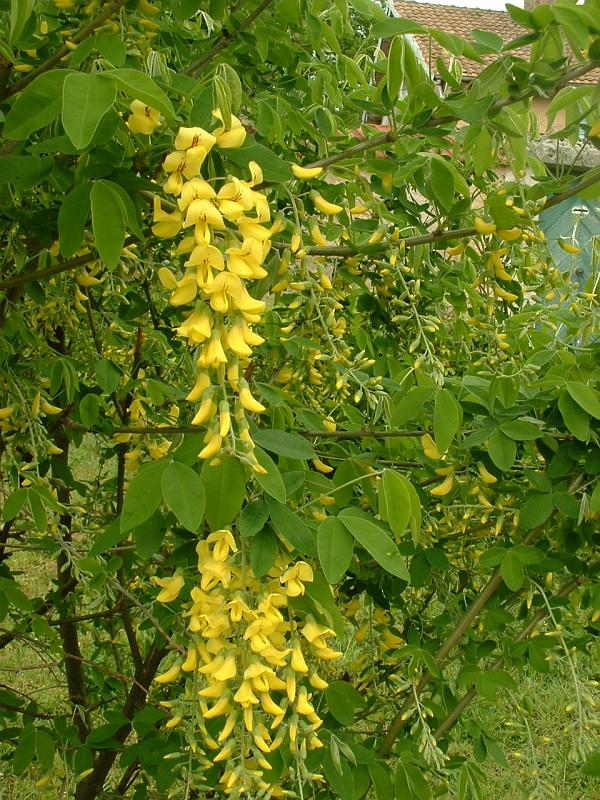

Conservation status
- Least Concern (IUCN 3.1)

Scientific classification
- Kingdom: Plantae
- Clade: Embryophytes
- Clade: Tracheophytes
- Clade: Angiosperms
- Clade: Eudicots
- Clade: Rosids
- Order: Fabales
- Family: Fabaceae
- Subfamily: Faboideae
- Genus: Laburnum
- Species: L. anagyroides

Binomial name
- Laburnum anagyroides Medik., 1787

Synonyms
- Cytisus laburnum L.; Laburnum vulgare J.Presl

= Laburnum anagyroides =

Species of plant

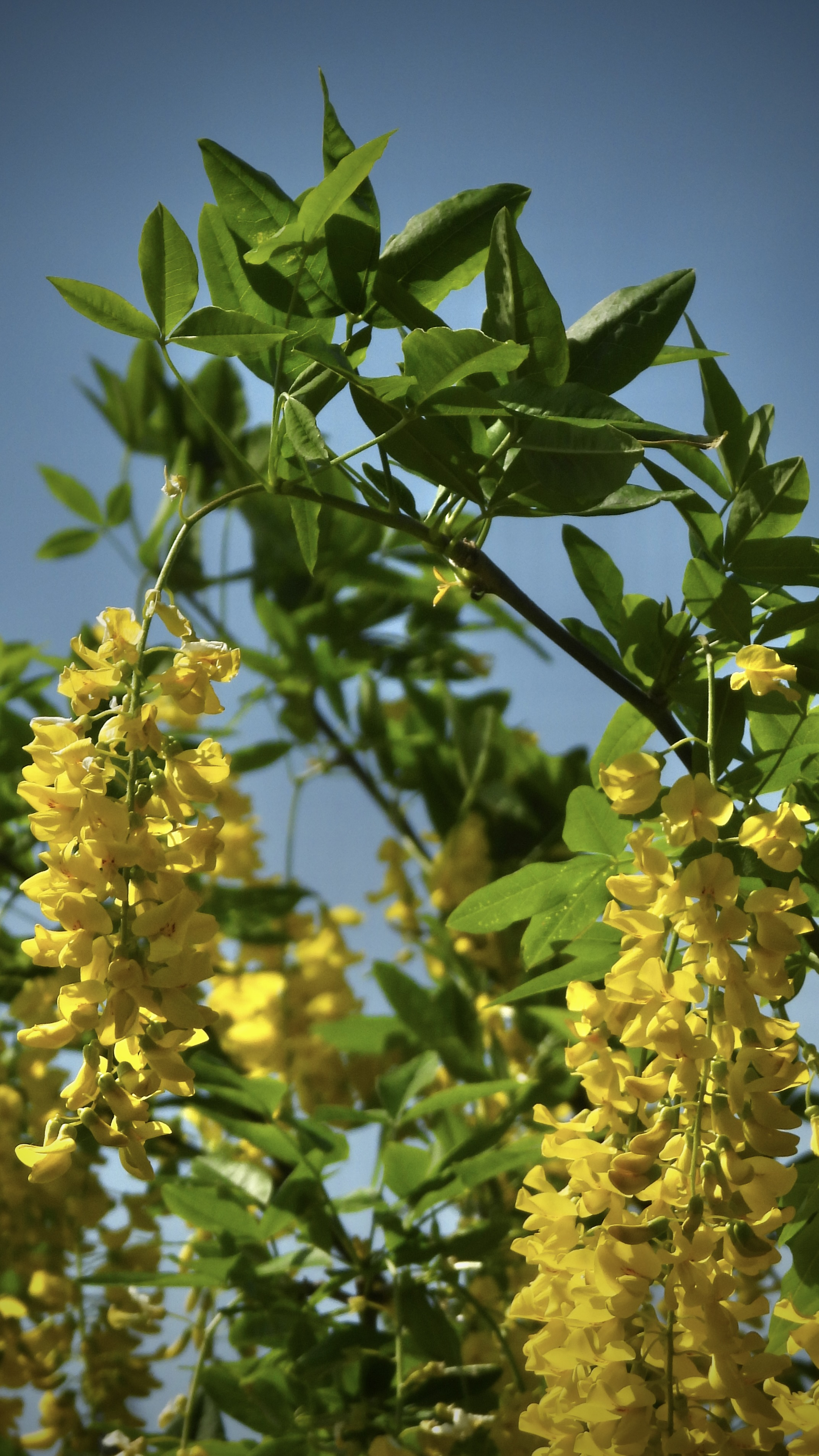
The yellow inflorescence of the Golden Chain Tree (Laburnum anagyroides).

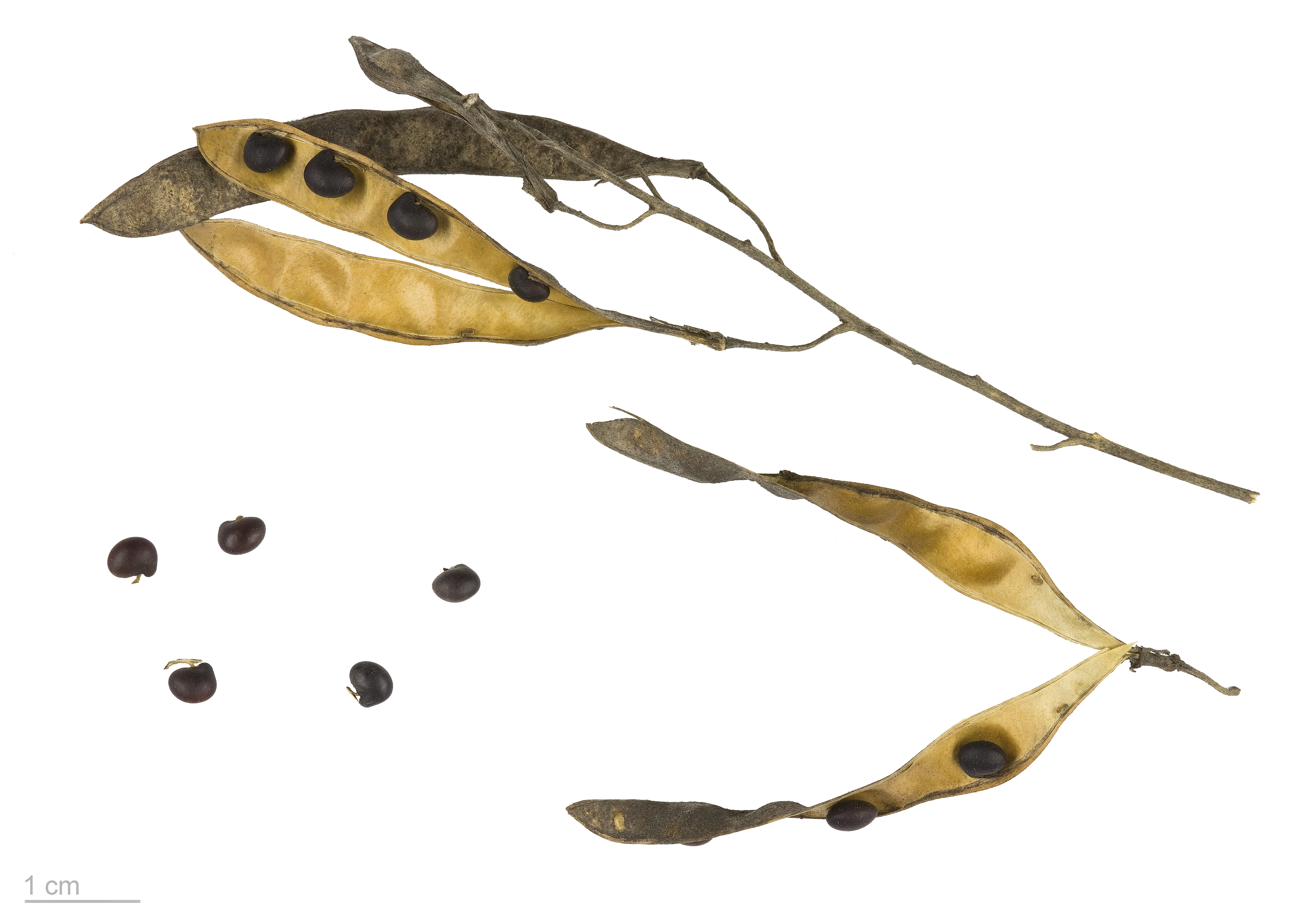
Laburnum anagyroides - MHNT

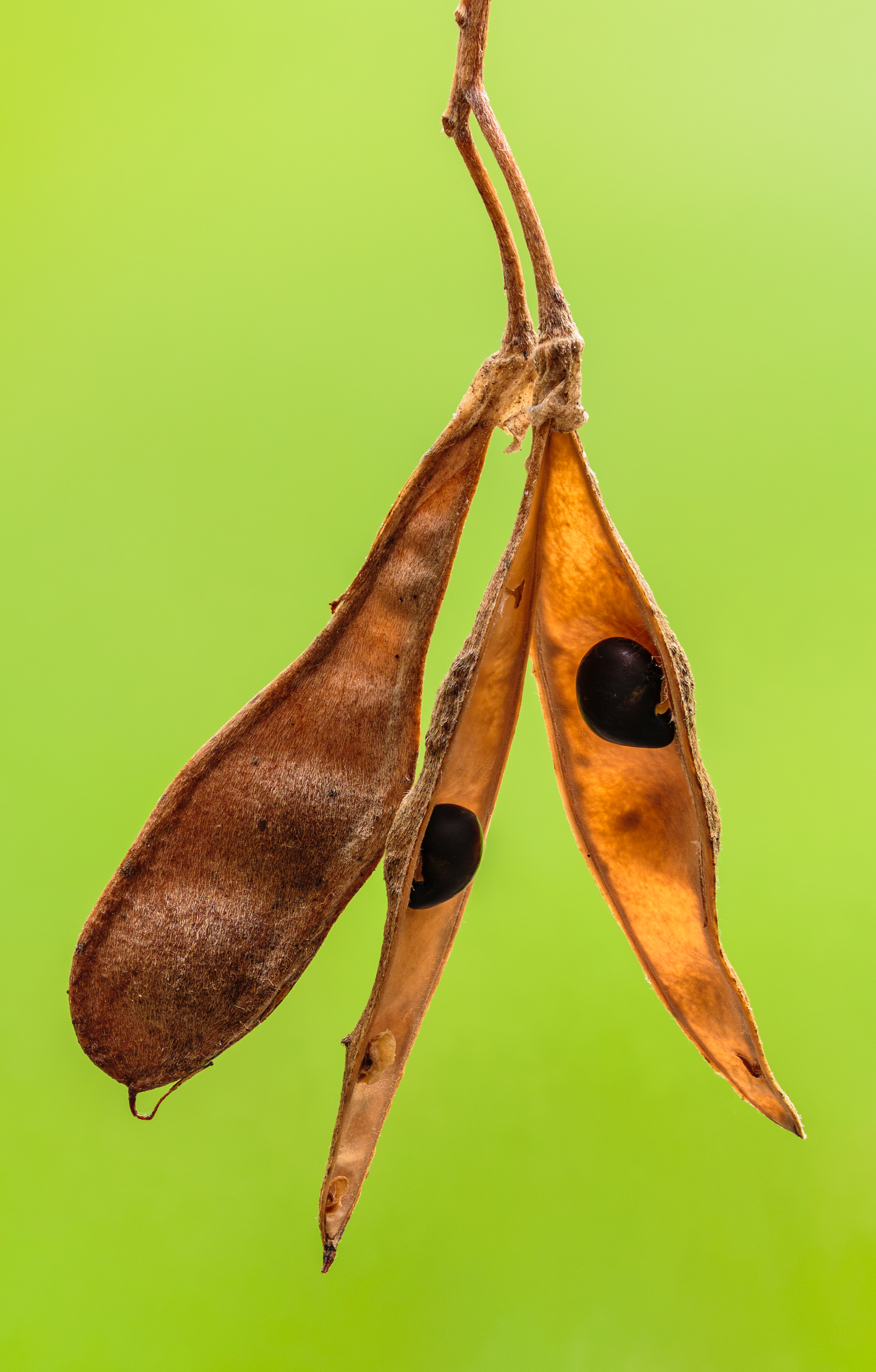
Pod and seed

Laburnum anagyroides (syn. Cytisus laburnum), the common laburnum, golden chain or golden rain, is a species of flowering plant in the subfamily Faboideae, and genus Laburnum. Laburnum alpinum is closely related. It is native to central and southern Europe.

The plant grows and flowers in damp and mild habitats, especially in the calcareous soils of Southern Europe.

== Description ==
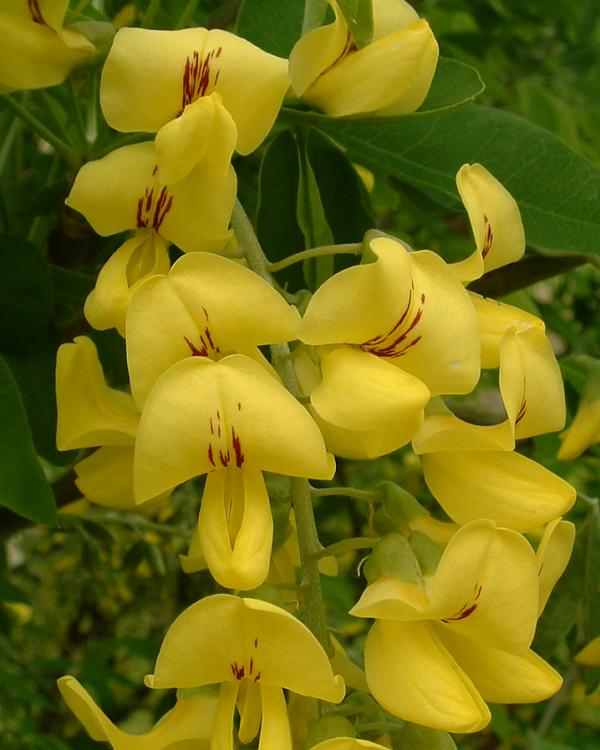
Detail of the flowers

The plant is a small deciduous tree or large shrub up to 7 m (23 ft) tall. It has smooth bark, dark green spreading branches and pendulous and pubescent twigs. The leaves are generally trifoliate and oval with long petioles, smooth on the upperside and hairy on the underside. It flowers during May and June.

Laburnum anagyroides blooms in late spring with pea-like, yellow flowers densely packed in pendulous racemes 10–25 cm (4–10 in) long. The flowers are golden yellow, sweet scented, and typically bloom in May.

The pods are legumes with large numbers of black seeds that contain cytisine, an alkaloid somewhat poisonous to humans as well as goats and horses, especially when not ripe. However, some wild animals such as hares and deer can feed on them without any problems, and because of this the plant is believed to have magic properties in some regions.

== Uses ==
The wood is hard and heavy, of a yellow/brown colour, ideal for making posts, for woodturning and as fuel. In the past (and today on historic re-enactments) it was used for making bows.

The tree is also known as false ebony since the wood from very old specimens could be used in place of ebony.

A substance from the plant, cytisine, is used as a medicine for smoking cessation.

=== Cultivation ===
Laburnum anagyroides is cultivated as an ornamental tree. The most common ornamental plant in the genus is a hybrid between this species and Laburnum alpinum — Laburnum × watereri.

== In culture ==
The English poet Francis Thompson described the laburnum in one of his poems:

Mark yonder, how the long laburnum drips
Its jocund spilth of fire, its honey of wild flame!

— Francis Thompson, Sister Songs (1895)

The writer J. R. R. Tolkien was inspired by the laburnum for his creation of Laurelin, one of the two mythological trees in The Silmarillion, and Tolkien's description of it is strongly influenced by Thompson's verses.
