= Uresiphita mongolicalis =

Scientific classification
- Domain: Eukaryota
- Kingdom: Animalia
- Phylum: Arthropoda
- Class: Insecta
- Order: Lepidoptera
- Family: Crambidae
- Genus: Uresiphita
- Species: U. mongolicalis

Binomial name
- Uresiphita mongolicalis (Caradja, 1916)

Synonyms
- Mecyna mongolicalis Caradja, 1916

Species of moth

Uresiphita mongolicalis is a moth in the family Crambidae. It was described by Aristide Caradja in 1916. It is found in Mongolia.
