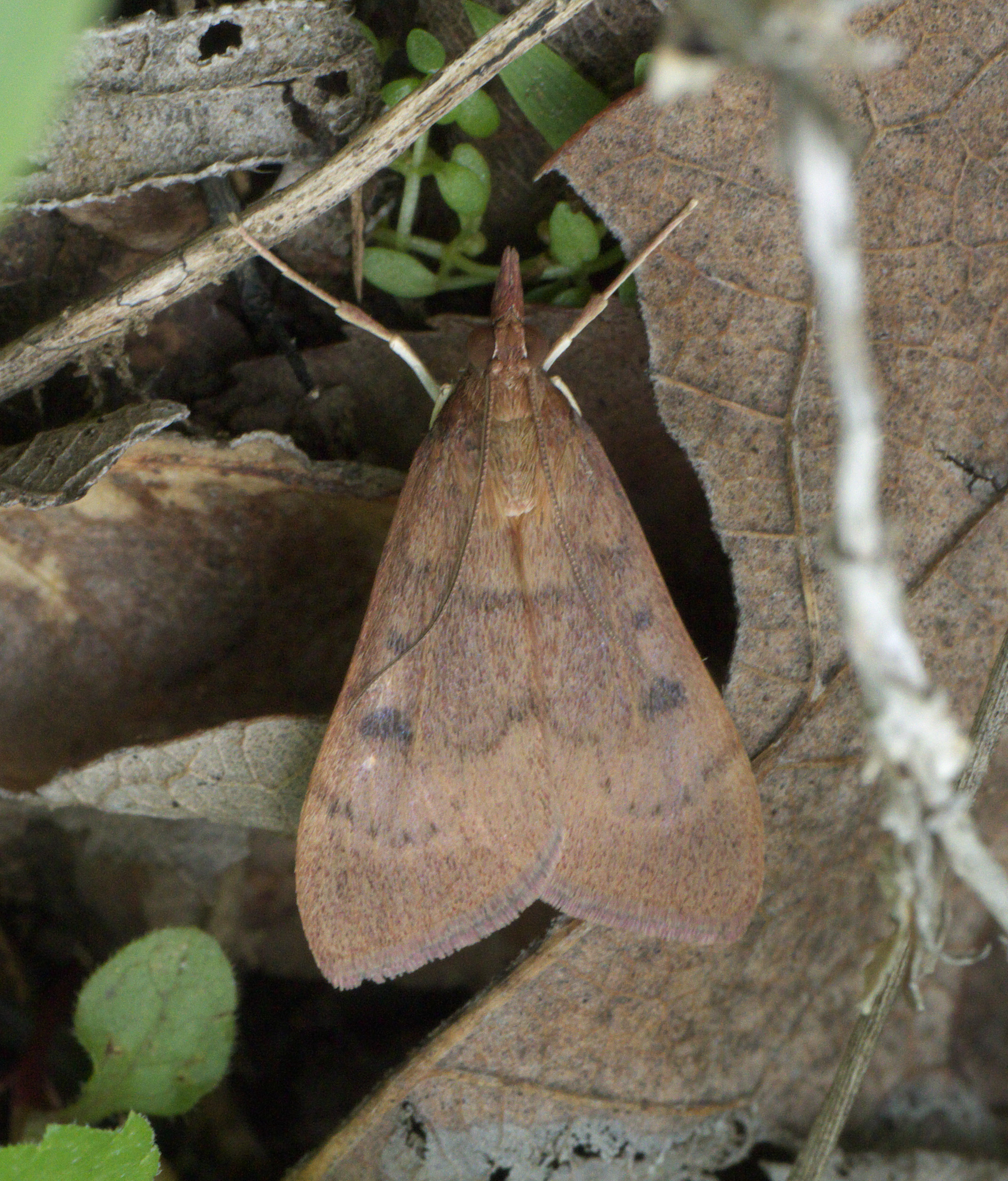
- Adult
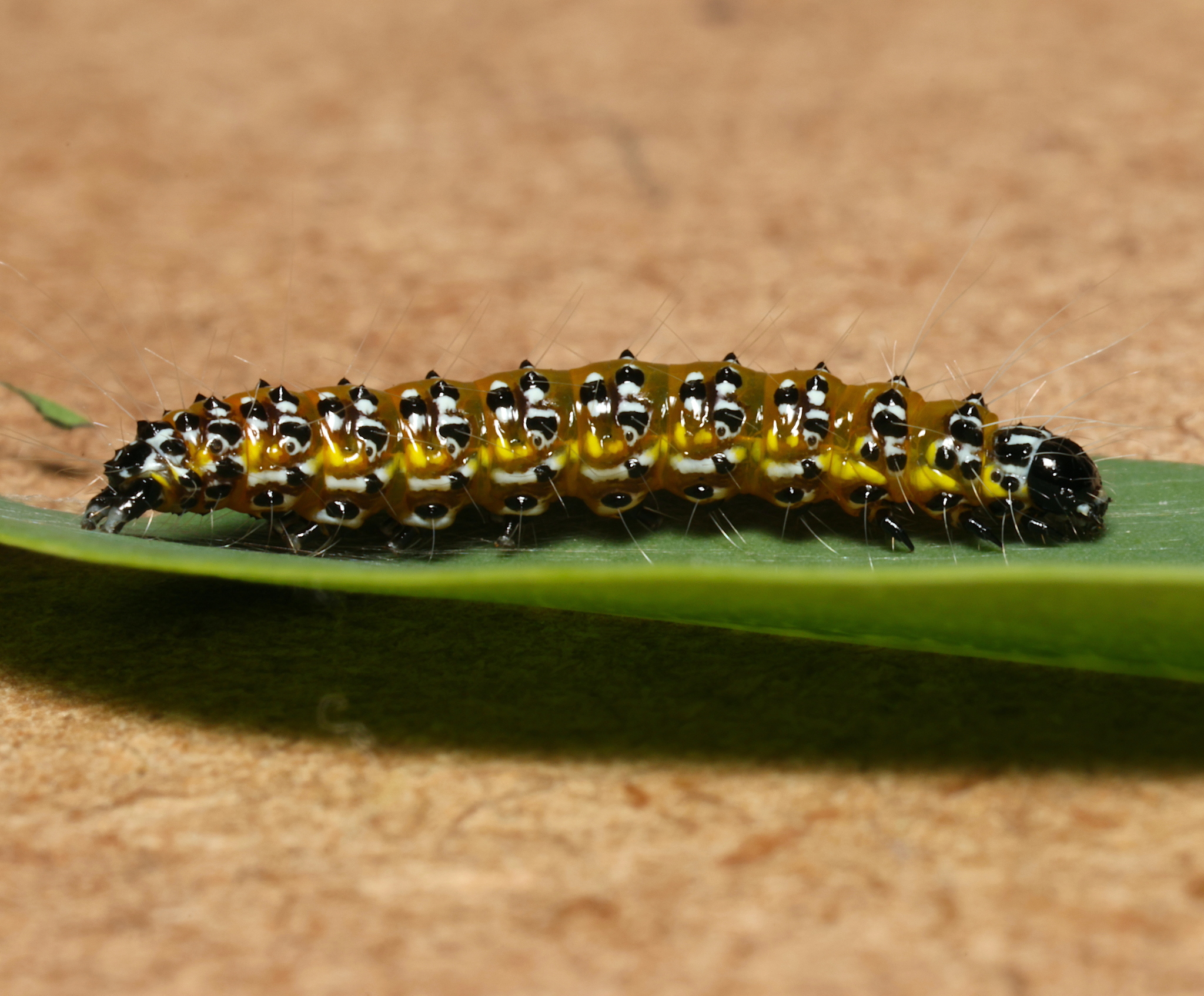
- Larva

Scientific classification
- Kingdom: Animalia
- Phylum: Arthropoda
- Class: Insecta
- Order: Lepidoptera
- Family: Crambidae
- Genus: Uresiphita
- Species: U. reversalis

Binomial name
- Uresiphita reversalis (Guenée, 1854)

Synonyms
- Mecyna reversalis Guenée, 1854; Botys hilaralis Herrich-Schäffer, 1871

= Uresiphita reversalis =

Species of moth

Uresiphita reversalis, the genista broom moth or sophora worm, is a moth in the family Crambidae. It was described by Achille Guenée in 1854. U. reversalis was probably native to Mexico before spreading north and becoming established in Los Angeles by 1930 and the San Francisco Bay Area by 1980. It has since been recorded across the United States and in Cuba, Bermuda, Puerto Rico and Jamaica. Both adults and caterpillars are aposematic.

== Description ==
The wingspan is 27–34 mm. Adults are on wing year round in multiple generations per year in the southern part of the range.

The larvae feed on Acacia, Lonicera, Baptisia (including Baptisia leucantha), Genista (including Genista monspessulana) and Lupinus species (including Lupinus arboreus and Lupinus diffusus), Dermatophyllum secundiflorum, Lagerstroemia indica, Cytisus scoparius and Cytisus striatus.
