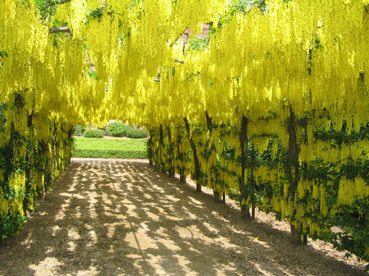
- The John Beer Laburnum Walk

Scientific classification
- Kingdom: Plantae
- Clade: Tracheophytes
- Clade: Angiosperms
- Clade: Eudicots
- Clade: Rosids
- Order: Fabales
- Family: Fabaceae
- Subfamily: Faboideae
- Genus: Laburnum
- Species: L. × watereri

Binomial name
- Laburnum × watereri (A.C.Rosenthal & Bermann) Dippel

= Laburnum × watereri =

Hybrid plant species in the legume family

Laburnum × watereri (or Laburnum watereri), is a naturally occurring hybrid species of Laburnum, native to Central Europe. Its parents are common laburnum, Laburnum anagyroides, and alpine laburnum, Laburnum alpinum. A small deciduous tree or large shrub, it is a popular garden plant, called golden chain tree for its spectacular display of hanging clusters of yellow pea-like blossoms. It can be trained to take forms such as arches and espaliers.

The best known cultivar is 'Vossii', which has gained the Royal Horticultural Society's Award of Garden Merit. Growing eventually to 8 m (26 ft) tall and broad, it bears pendent 60 cm (24 in) racemes of bright yellow flowers in spring. It prefers a position in full sun.

All parts of the plant are poisonous, although mortality is very rare.
