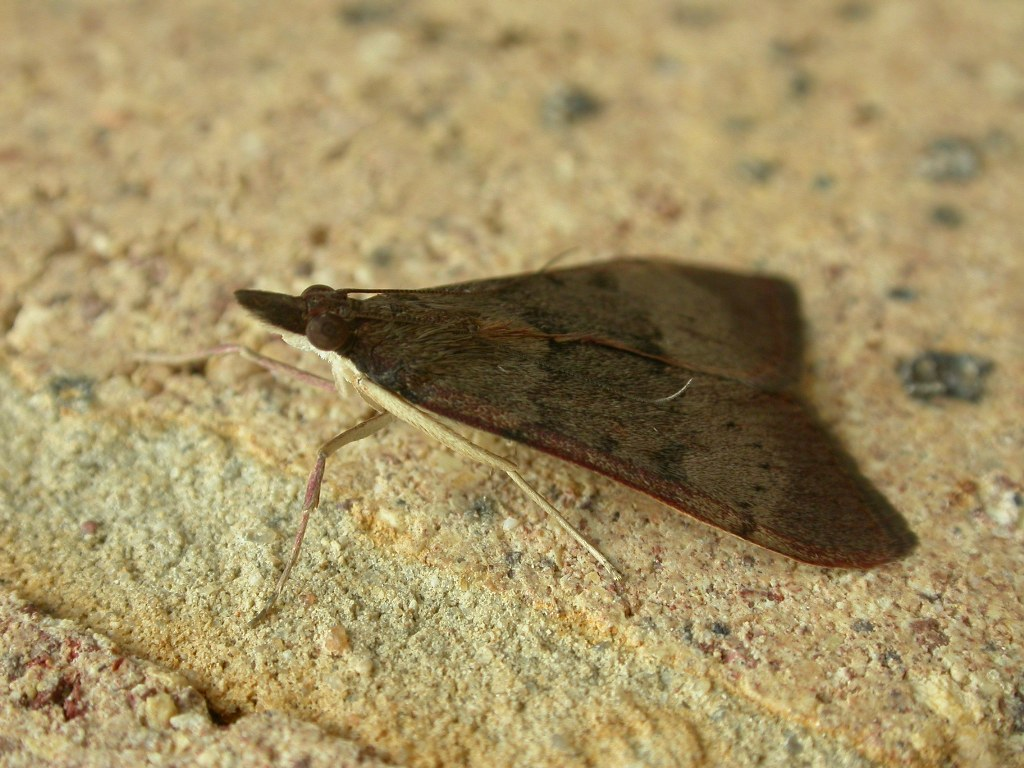

Scientific classification
- Kingdom: Animalia
- Phylum: Arthropoda
- Class: Insecta
- Order: Lepidoptera
- Family: Crambidae
- Genus: Uresiphita
- Species: U. ornithopteralis

Binomial name
- Uresiphita ornithopteralis (Guenée, 1854)

Synonyms
- Mecyna ornithopteralis Guenée, 1854

= Uresiphita ornithopteralis =

Species of moth

Uresiphita ornithopteralis, the tree lucerne moth, is a moth of the family Crambidae. It was described by Achille Guenée in 1854. It is found in New South Wales, Norfolk Island, Queensland, Victoria, South Australia, Tasmania and Western Australia. It is also found in New Zealand.

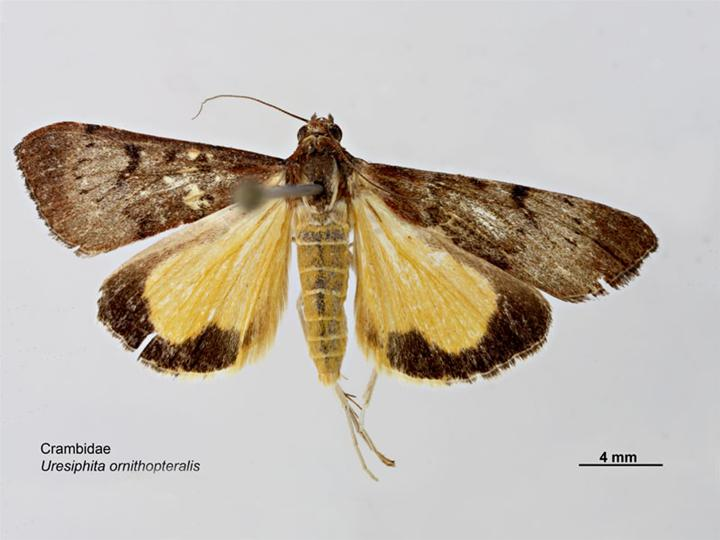
Dorsal view

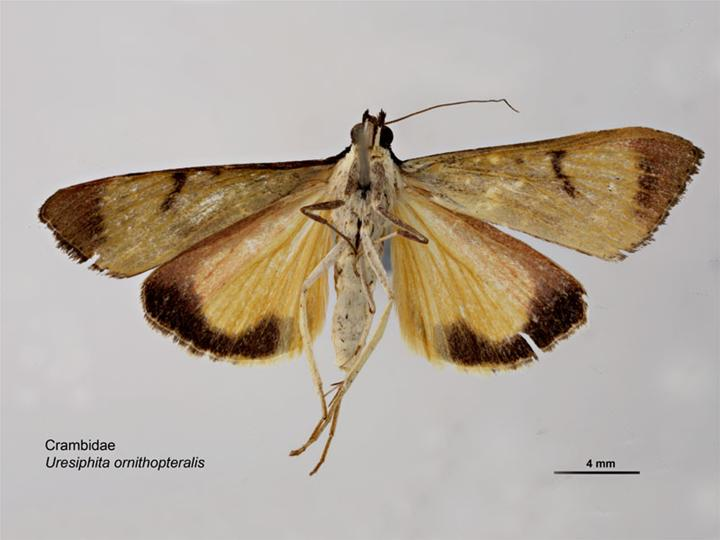
Ventral view

The wingspan is about 30 mm.

The larvae feed on Cytisus scoparius and other Fabaceae species like Genista monspessulana and Hovea species.
