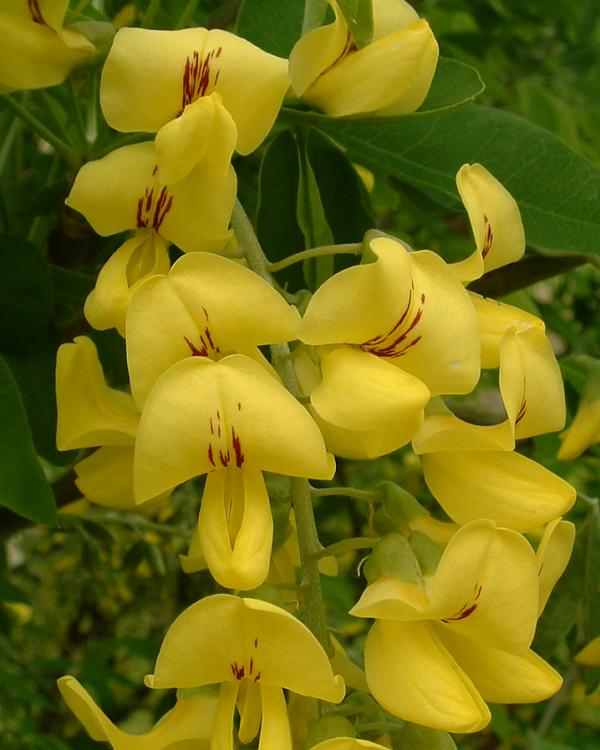
- Common laburnum – flowers

Scientific classification
- Kingdom: Plantae
- Clade: Embryophytes
- Clade: Tracheophytes
- Clade: Spermatophytes
- Clade: Angiosperms
- Clade: Eudicots
- Clade: Rosids
- Order: Fabales
- Family: Fabaceae
- Subfamily: Faboideae
- Tribe: Genisteae
- Genus: Laburnum; Fabr.

Species
- See text

= Laburnum =

Genus of plants

Laburnum, sometimes called golden chain or golden rain, is a genus of two species of small trees in the subfamily Faboideae of the pea family Fabaceae. The species are Laburnum anagyroides—common laburnum and Laburnum alpinum—alpine laburnum. They are native to the mountains of Southern Europe.

Some botanists include a third species, Laburnum caramanicum, but this native of southeast Europe and Anatolia is usually treated in a distinct genus Podocytisus, more closely allied to the Genisteae (brooms).

== Description ==
The Laburnum trees are deciduous. The leaves are trifoliate, somewhat like a clover; the leaflets are typically 2–3 cm (3/4–1 1/4 in) long in L. anagyroides and 4–5 cm (1 1/2–2 in) long in L. alpinum.

They have yellow pea-flowers in pendulous leafless racemes 10–40 cm (4–15 1/2 in) long in spring, which makes them very popular garden trees. In L. anagyroides, the racemes are 10–20 cm (4–8 in) long, with densely packed flowers; in L. alpinum the racemes are 20–30 cm (8–12 in) long, but with the flowers sparsely along the raceme. The fruit develops as a pod and is extremely poisonous.

The yellow flowers are responsible for the old poetic name 'golden chain tree' (also written as golden chaintree or goldenchain tree).

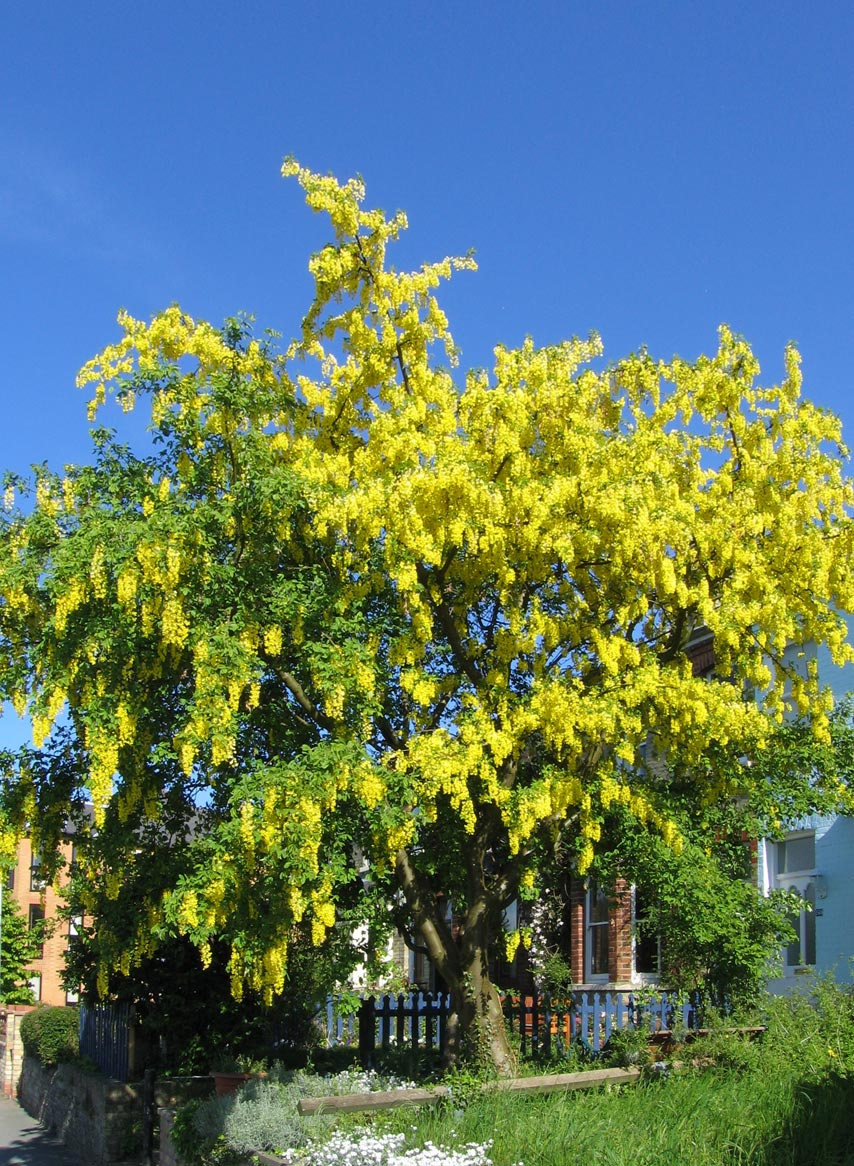
Laburnum tree in full flower

All parts of the plant are poisonous, although mortality is very rare. Symptoms of laburnum poisoning may include intense sleepiness, vomiting, convulsive movements, coma, slight frothing at the mouth and unequally dilated pupils. In some cases, diarrhea is very severe, and at times the convulsions are markedly tetanic. The main toxin in the plant is cytisine, a nicotinic receptor agonist.

It is used as a food plant by the larvae of some Lepidoptera species, including the Palearctic moth, the buff-tip.

== Species ==
=== Accepted binomials ===
Laburnum comprises the following species:

- Laburnum alpinum (Mill.) Bercht. & J. Presl
- Laburnum anagyroides Medik.

=== Reclassified binomials ===
- Laburnum caramanicum was reclassified as Podocytisus caramanicus.
- Laburnum platycarpum was reclassified as Hesperolaburnum platycarpum.
- Laburnum vulgare was reclassified as Laburnum anagyroides.

=== Species names with uncertain taxonomic status ===
The status of the following species is unresolved:

- Laburnum album J.Presl
- Laburnum arboreum J.Presl
- Laburnum biflorum G.Nicholson
- Laburnum fragrans Griseb.
- Laburnum grandiflorum (DC.) J.Presl
- Laburnum heuffelii Wierzb. ex Fuss
- Laburnum ianigerum J. Presl
- Laburnum intermedium Dippel
- Laburnum jacquinianum Dalla Torre & Sarnth.
- Laburnum jaquinianum Dieck
- Laburnum laburnum (L.) Voss
- Laburnum laburnum Dörfl.
- Laburnum lanigerum J.Presl
- Laburnum linneanum Dieck
- Laburnum monadelphum Pritz.
- Laburnum nigricans J.Presl
- Laburnum nigricanum Fuss
- Laburnum nubigenum J.Presl
- Laburnum patens J.Presl
- Laburnum pendulum Raf.
- Laburnum praecox Fuss
- Laburnum purpurascens hort. & Vilm.
- Laburnum purpureum (Scop.) Drapiez
- Laburnum ramentaceum (Sieber) K.Koch
- Laburnum rochelii Wierzb. ex Fuss
- Laburnum serotinum Hort. ex Dippel
- Laburnum sessilifolium J.Presl
- Laburnum spinosum J.Presl
- Laburnum tardiflorum auct.
- Laburnum triflorum J.Presl
- Laburnum variabile hort. & Vilm.
- Laburnum weldeni Griseb. ex Lavall.
- Laburnum weldenii Griseb. ex Lavallée

=== Hybrids ===
The following hybrids have been described:

- Laburnum × watereri (Wettst.) Dippel (L. alpinum × L. anagyroides)

There is also a graft-chimaera, + Laburnocytisus 'Adamii' Lavallée.

== Uses ==
=== Woodworking ===
Laburnum has historically been used for cabinetmaking and inlay, as well as for musical instruments. In addition to such wind instruments, it was a popular wood for Great Highland Bagpipes before taste turned to imported dense tropical hardwoods such as Brya ebenus (cocus wood), ebony, and Dalbergia melanoxylon (African monkeywood). The heart-wood of a laburnum may be used as a substitute for ebony or rosewood. It is very hard and a dark chocolate brown, with a butter-yellow sapwood.

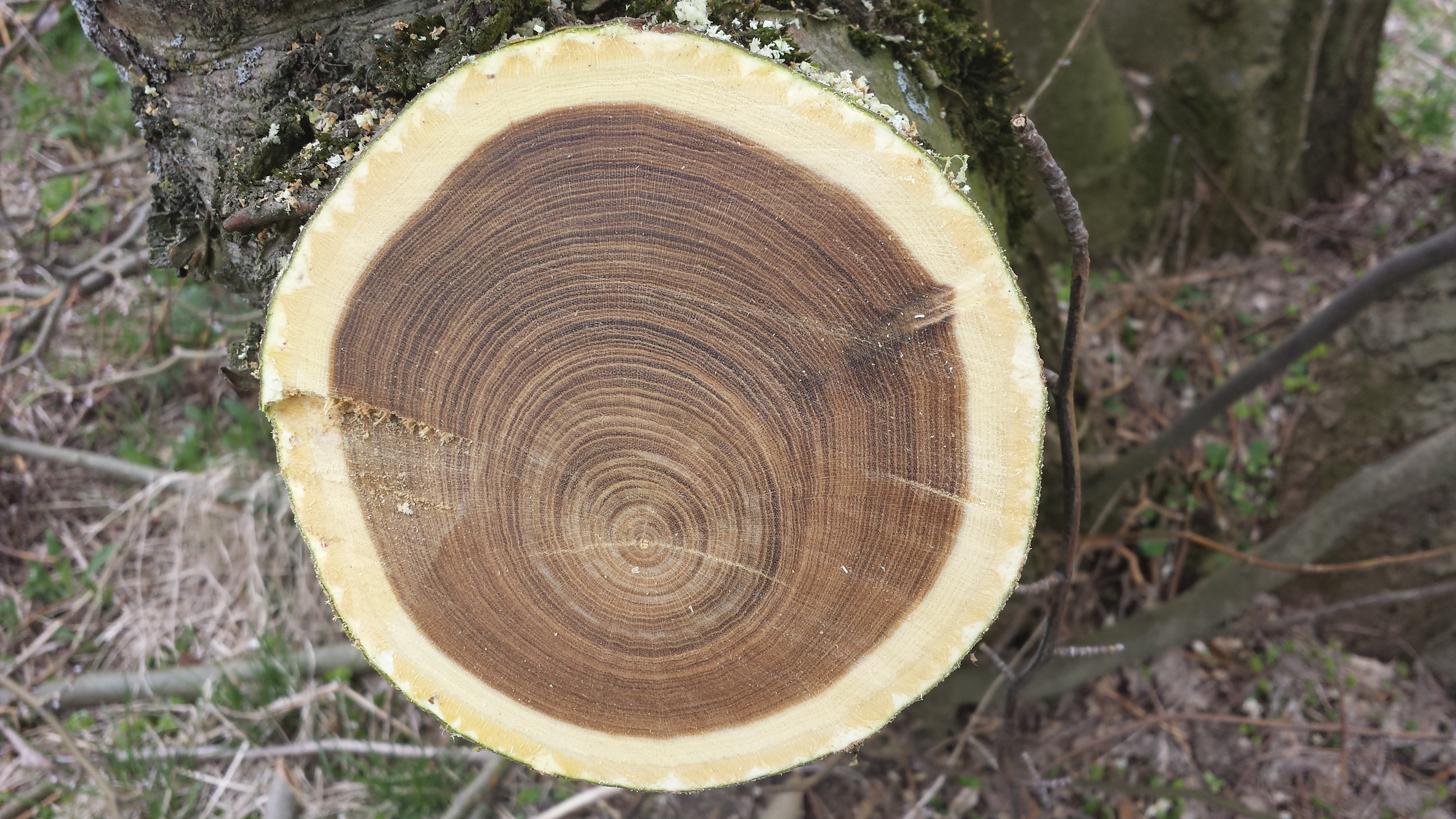
Freshly cross cut laburnum with visible heart-wood

=== Cultivation ===
Laburnum species and hybrids are cultivated as ornamental trees for gardens and parks. They are also trained as espaliers on pergolas, for ceilings of pendant flowers in season. In its natural form, Laburnum is a shrubby, multi-branched tree, but it is often pruned to maintain a single trunk which displays the smooth green bark.

Gardeners are advised to remove the spent seedpods after flowering because they sap the strength of the tree and are the most poisonous part. Generally Laburnum does not perform well in hot climates, and has a reduced life-span if grown in climates with warm winters. Afternoon shade and the occasional deep watering are advisable in areas with hot, dry summers. They do best in climates with moderate winter and summer temperatures, ideally Oceanic climates like those of the Pacific Northwest and Northern Europe. Laburnum trees are ubiquitous in the British Isles, where they are commonly planted as lawn specimens or in shrub borders.

Most garden specimens are of the hybrid between the two species, Laburnum × watereri 'Vossii' (Voss's laburnum), which combines the longer racemes of L. alpinum with the denser flowers of L. anagyroides; it also has the benefit of low seed production. It has gained the Royal Horticultural Society's Award of Garden Merit.
