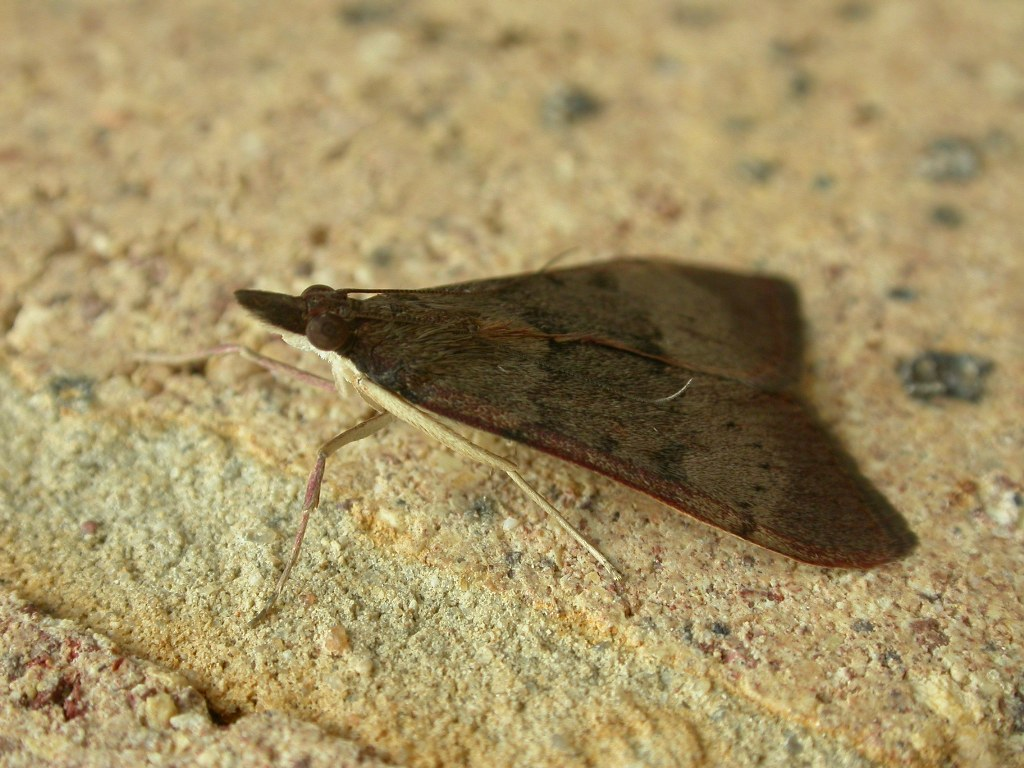
- U. ornithopteralis

Scientific classification
- Domain: Eukaryota
- Kingdom: Animalia
- Phylum: Arthropoda
- Class: Insecta
- Order: Lepidoptera
- Family: Crambidae
- Subfamily: Pyraustinae
- Genus: Uresiphita; Hübner, 1825

Synonyms
- Mecyna Guenée, 1854; Uresiphoeta J. L. R. Agassiz, 1847

= Uresiphita =

Genus of moths

Uresiphita is a genus of moths of the family Crambidae.

== Species ==
- Uresiphita gilvata (Fabricius, 1794)
- Uresiphita insulicola
- Uresiphita mongolicalis (Caradja, 1916)
- Uresiphita ornithopteralis (Guenée, 1854)
- Uresiphita polygonalis (Denis & Schiffermueller, 1775)
- Uresiphita reversalis (Guenée, 1854)

== Former species ==
- Uresiphita catalalis (Viette, 1953)
- Uresiphita maorialis (C. Felder, R. Felder & Rogenhofer, 1875)
