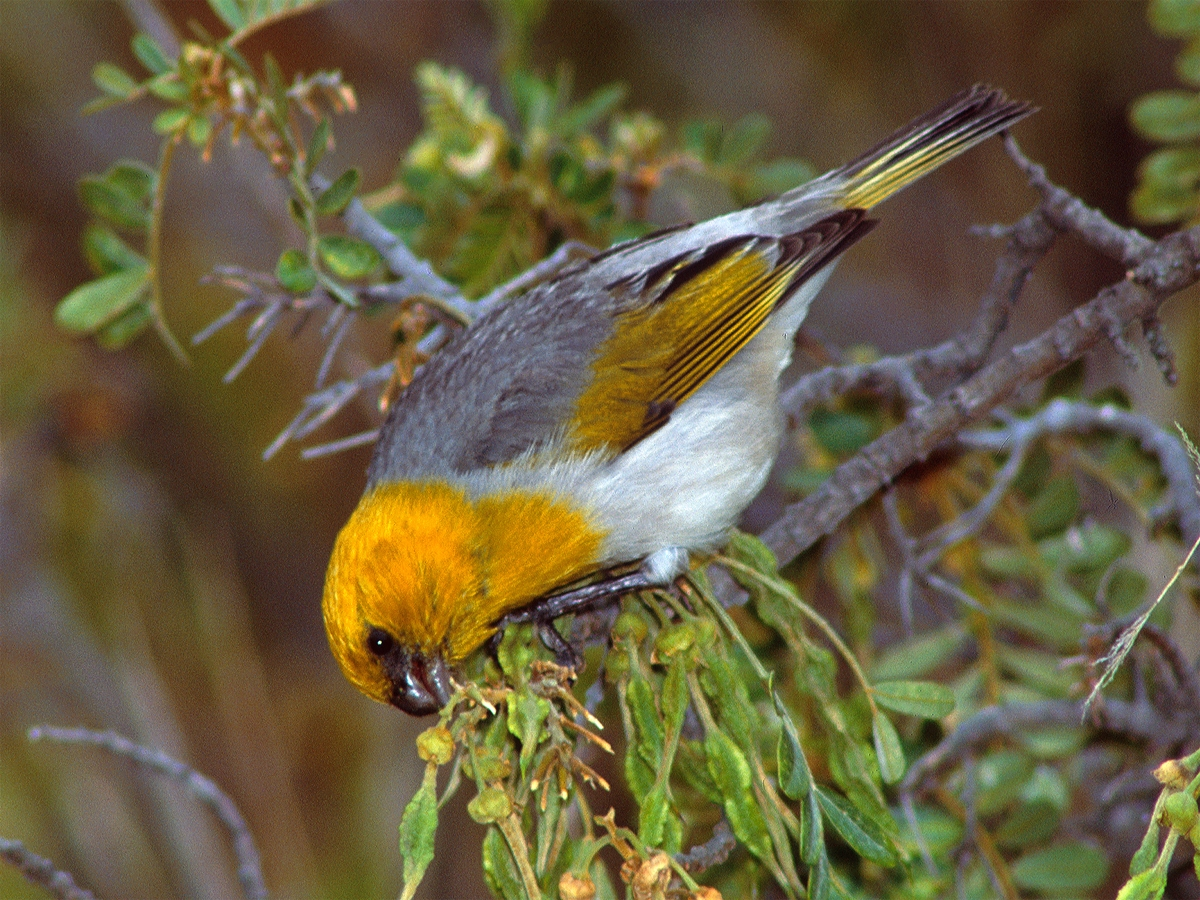

Conservation status
- Critically Endangered (IUCN 3.1)

Scientific classification
- Kingdom: Animalia
- Phylum: Chordata
- Class: Aves
- Order: Passeriformes
- Family: Fringillidae
- Subfamily: Carduelinae
- Genus: Loxioides
- Species: L. bailleui

Binomial name
- Loxioides bailleui Oustalet, 1877
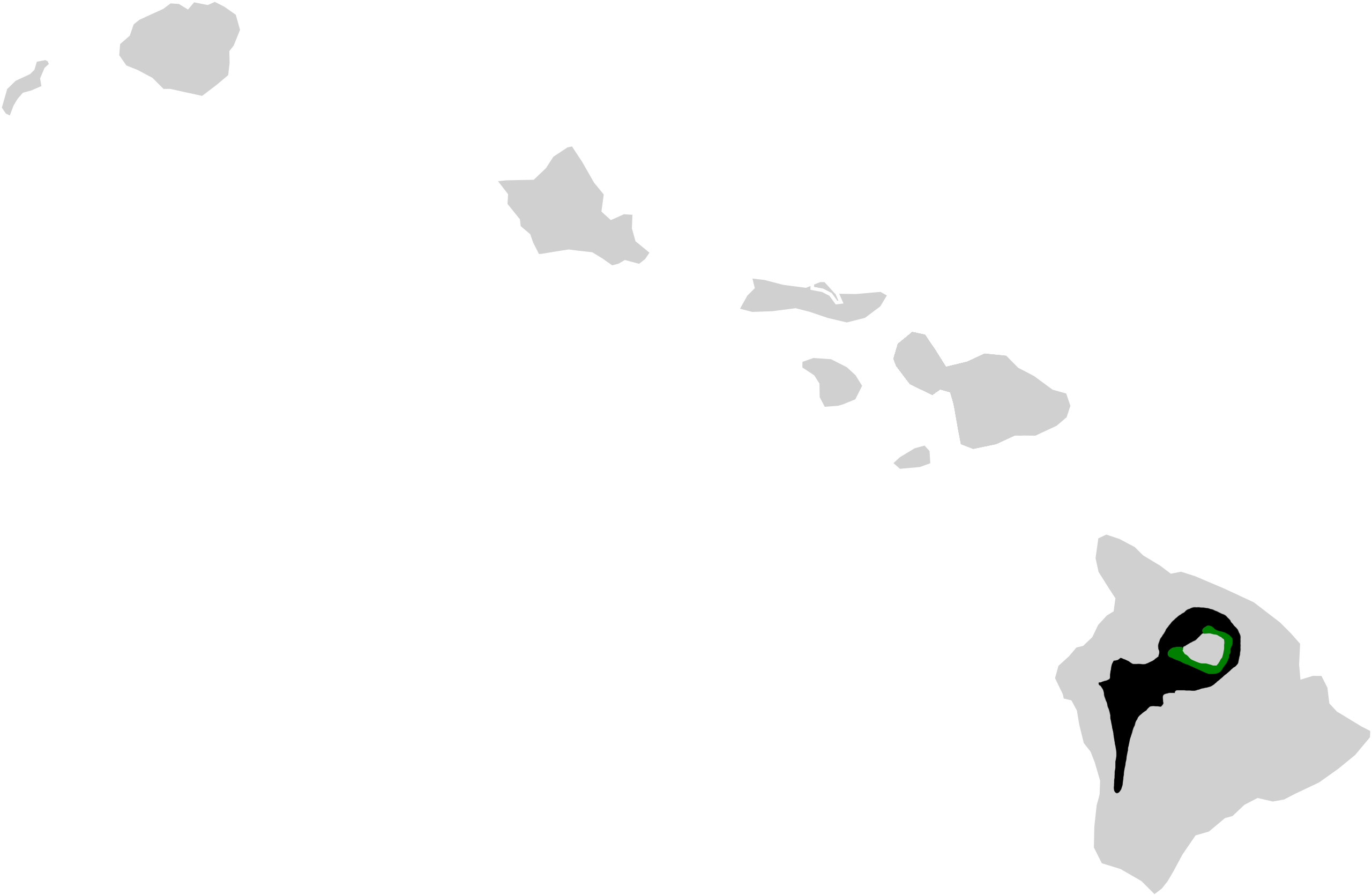
- Black: Extinct; Green: Current range

Synonyms
- Psittacirostra psittacea (partim) Perkins (non Gmelin), 1983 (lapsus); Psittirostra bailleui

= Palila =

Species of bird

The palila (Loxioides bailleui) is a critically endangered finch-billed species of Hawaiian honeycreeper. It has a golden-yellow head and breast, with a light belly, gray back, and greenish wings and tail. The bird has a close ecological relationship with the māmane tree (Sophora chrysophylla), and became endangered due to destruction of the trees and accompanying dry forests. The first specimen of the palila was collected in 1876 at the Greenwell Ranch on the Big Island by Pierre Étienne Théodore Ballieu (1828–1885), who was French consul in Hawaiʻi from 1869 to 1878. The type specimen (No. 1876-645) is housed at the Muséum national d'histoire naturelle in Paris.

== Taxonomy ==
The Hawaiian honeycreepers (Drepanididae) are sometimes included in the true finch family (Fringillidae). Oustalet scientifically described the palila in 1877. Named Loxioides bailleui by him, it was for some time united with several other "parrot-billed" Hawaiian honeycreeper species in Psittirostra. Currently, the palila has again been moved to genus Loxioides, which was long considered monotypic. The native name ʻōʻū poʻopapale ("capped ʻōʻū") probably refers to this species too. Despite its bill and habits being somewhat similar to the ʻōʻū, its color pattern betrays a very close relationship with the genus Telespiza.

== Description ==
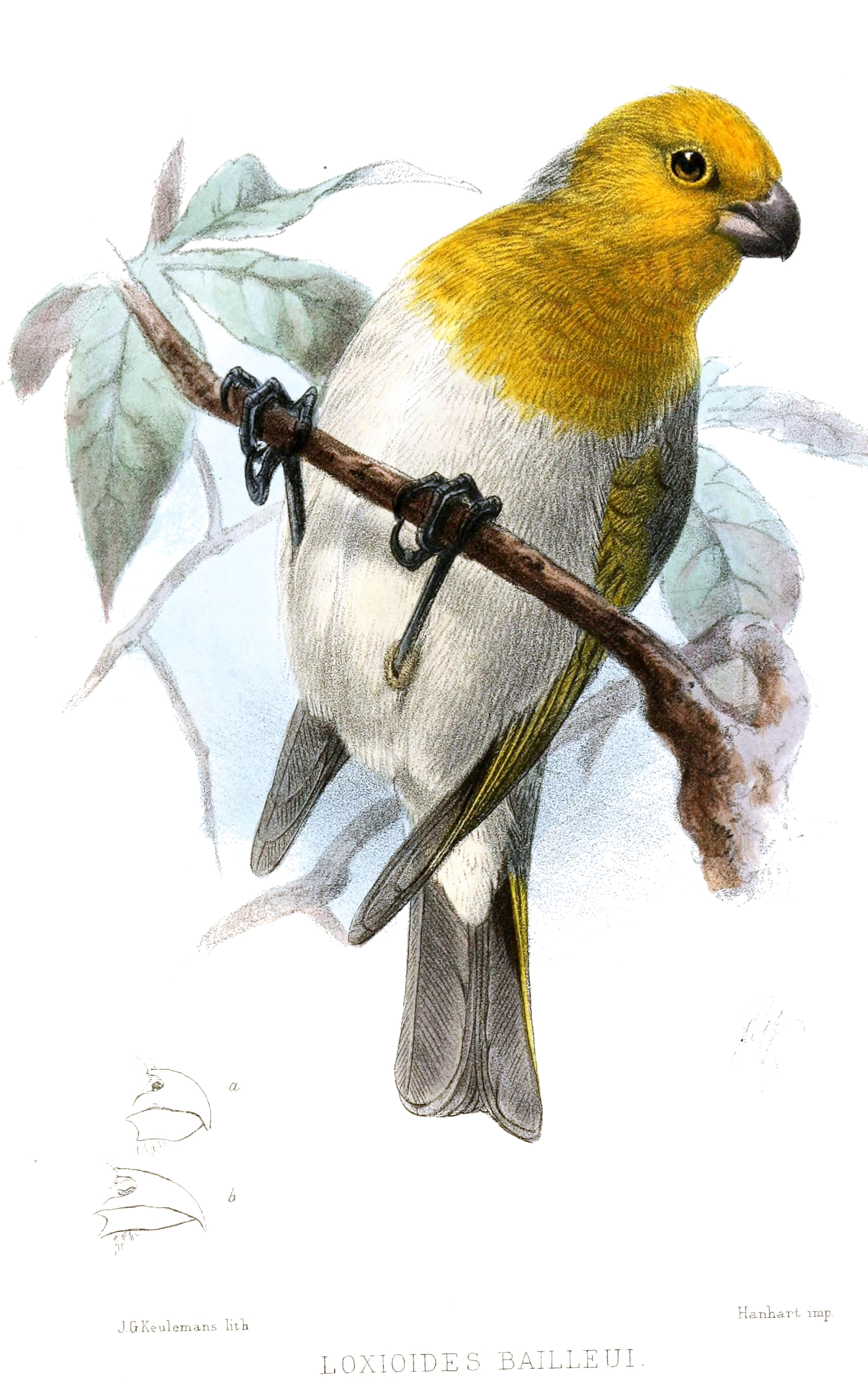
Illustration by J. G. Keulemans

The palila has a yellow head and breast, with white to light gray plumage ventrally, medium gray plumage dorsally, and olive-green wings and tail. The bird also has a heavy dark bill with swollen sides, a brown iris, and dark feet with yellowish soles. The palila is one of the largest living Hawaiian honeycreepers, measuring around 6–7.5 inches (15–19 cm). With a body mass of 38.1 g (1.34 oz) on average in males and 37.6 g (1.33 oz), it appears to be the heaviest Hawaiian honeycreeper.

There is some sexual dimorphism. Males tend to have brighter colors overall, as well as clear-cut black lores. The corresponding area contrasts less with the dirty-yellow heads in the marginally smaller females.

The bird's song is inconspicuous, containing whistling, warbling and trilling notes. The call is characteristic, however, being a clear, bell-like whistle, chee-clee-o or te-cleet. This is loudly communicated between birds advertising food during the morning and evening, and according to native informants, it is given most frequently during the day as rain approaches.

== Distribution and status ==
Currently, the palila can be found only on the upper slopes of Mauna Kea on the island of Hawaiʻi. Palila live from about 6,500 to 9,500 feet (2,000 to 2,900 m) MASL. The population density of the bird increases in areas where māmane (Sophora chrysophylla) grows more plentifully, and the birds do not appear to venture far from māmane stands. Essentially, this means that the species is confined – and may always have been so – to the area above the moist forest belt at around 3,000–4,500 feet (910–1,370 m).

The fossil record shows that prior to human arrival the Palila also occurred in Kauaʻi and Oʻahu, and thus could likely have occurred on Maui and neighboring islands as well, but it has not been recorded out of the island of Hawaiʻi since European arrival. Palila are found in less than 10 percent of their historical range; they were found at elevations down to 4,000 feet (1,200 m) as late as the 19th century. Loxioides bailleui was abundant throughout Hawaiʻi until the beginning of the 20th century. It lived on the upper slopes of Mauna Kea, the northwest slopes of Mauna Loa, and the eastern slopes of Hualālai. Then, as early as 1944, scientists believed the bird almost extinct.

On March 11, 1967, the palila was listed as an endangered species under the Endangered Species Act. In 1975, it was estimated that only 1,614 palila existed. In 1978, the 9th Circuit Court of Appeals ruled that feral sheep and goats had to be removed from critical habitat of the bird. From annual counts between 1980 and 1996, variable estimates of population ranged from 1,584 to 5,685 mature birds, though there were no consistent trends. In 1997, the west slope of Mauna Kea contained 72% of the population. The entire population, an estimated 4,396 birds, occupied an estimated 78 square kilometres (19,000 acres).

From 1998 to 2024, the population declined by more than 90%, or 205 birds per year, with 100% statistical support for an overall downward trend. As of 2024, the estimated population was between 412 and 970 birds, with a point estimate of 666 individuals. The U.S. Fish and Wildlife Service completed a five-year review of the palila in 2025, confirming its status as "endangered."

== Conservation and threats ==
The remaining habitat of the palila is actively being preserved, with public access being limited to nature trails such as the Palila Forest Discovery Trail on Mauna Kea. The San Diego Zoo has a captive breeding program for the palila based in the Keauhou Bird Conservation Center on Hawaii Island. In May 2019, 6 palila were reintroduced to a patch of restored forest on the island in order to establish a second population, marking the first reintroduction attempt for the species.

As of 2025, the current captive flock includes five females and three males. The range of ages is two to 12 years old. Due to the lower survival rate and reproductive success of palila in captivity, there are plans to release the captive reared palila possibly in 2026.

Threats to the palila's survival include drought, fire, invasive mammalian predators, especially feral cats, invasive weeds, māmane fungal pathogens, and introduced insects that reduce food resources. The greatest known driver of palila declines has been extensive habitat loss from deforestation by humans and browsing by ungulates. A 2025 study concluded: "Perhaps the hardest threat to combat is climate change, because Palila population declines are strongly associated with severe drought events that suppress māmane reproduction."

== Ecology and behavior ==
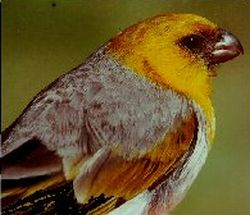
Closeup (probably of an adult female)

The palila favors a māmane and māmane-naio (Myoporum sandwicense) dry forest habitat mix containing, apart from the forest, patches of grasslands, pūkiawe (Styphelia tameiameiae) shrubland on lava fields, and other types of native understory vegetation.

The diet of the palila is almost exclusively the immature seeds of māmane when these are available. These contain much vile-tasting phenolic compounds in the seed coat and a lethal amount of quinolizidine alkaloids in the embryos themselves. By some undetermined means, adult palila are able to cope with a dose of these toxins that would kill other small animals in mere minutes. The amount of toxin in māmane varies, and the palila can be seen to avoid certain trees. It is possible that these contain the highest amounts of poison, but how the birds would be able to recognize this is not known.

The bitter taste of the seed coats probably does not affect the birds (see below). Nonetheless, the seed coats are not very nutritious, and are thus discarded. Palila bills are adapted to open Fabales pods. The birds hold the pod with one foot and pry it open with the bill to expose the seeds. They then tear away the visible portion of the seed coat and extract the embryo, leaving the remaining coat in the pod. Seeds that drop out of the pod intact during opening are picked up and positioned longitudinally in the bill. The seed coat is then neatly cut open by the bill's edge and the embryo nudged out with the bird's tongue. The seed coat, still remaining in one piece, is then dropped.

Palila also eat naio berries and other fruit (such as the introduced Cape gooseberry), and māmane flowers, buds, and young leaves. Additionally, they feed on caterpillars, particularly those of Cydia species (māmane codling moths) and more rarely on those of Uresiphita polygonalis virescens (māmane snout moth). These caterpillars as well as other insects, along with the very nutritious māmane seeds, provide the palila's main source of protein. Nestlings, apparently not yet able to cope with the amount of poison contained in the seeds, are fed to a large extent on Cydia caterpillars. These destroy or discard the māmane's toxins they take up with their food, so that the caterpillars themselves are non-toxic. They do contain high amounts of phenolic compounds they probably sequester from their food and quite likely taste as bad. Palila do not seem to mind the adverse taste or are physically unable to perceive it, given that they go to great lengths to obtain this food during breeding season.

The abundance of māmane seeds affects reproduction rates and adult survival. Palila start to eat the seeds at higher elevations and then gradually move downslope. During droughts, when māmane seeds are scarce, most birds do not attempt to breed.

The birds normally breed from February to September. The female constructs a loose, cup-shaped nest around 4 inches (10 cm) in diameter high up in a māmane or naio tree. For this it uses grasses, stems, roots, lichen, and branch bark from the māmane trees provide the building material. Lichen and small leaves layer the inside of the nest. Usually the palila clutch size is two eggs. Both parents regurgitate food to feed their young. The juveniles remain in the nest for up to 31 days before fledging.

== Litigation ==
The Palila was the subject of a number of lawsuits brought by various environmental groups under the Endangered Species Act to protect the bird's habitat. Although notable in their own right for their analysis of that law's provisions regarding the meaning of "harm" in the statute, the suits are also notable for their name. Typically, the plaintiff in such a suit—say, the Natural Resources Defense Council—would be the named plaintiff in the case. Here, however, the bird itself appeared as the named plaintiff in the case caption: Palila v. Hawaii Department of Land and Natural Resources, 852 F.2d 1106 (9th Cir, 1988). Indeed, the cases are often referred to as Palila I and Palila II. Other notable Endangered Species Act cases including those involving the Northern Spotted Owl are similarly captioned.
