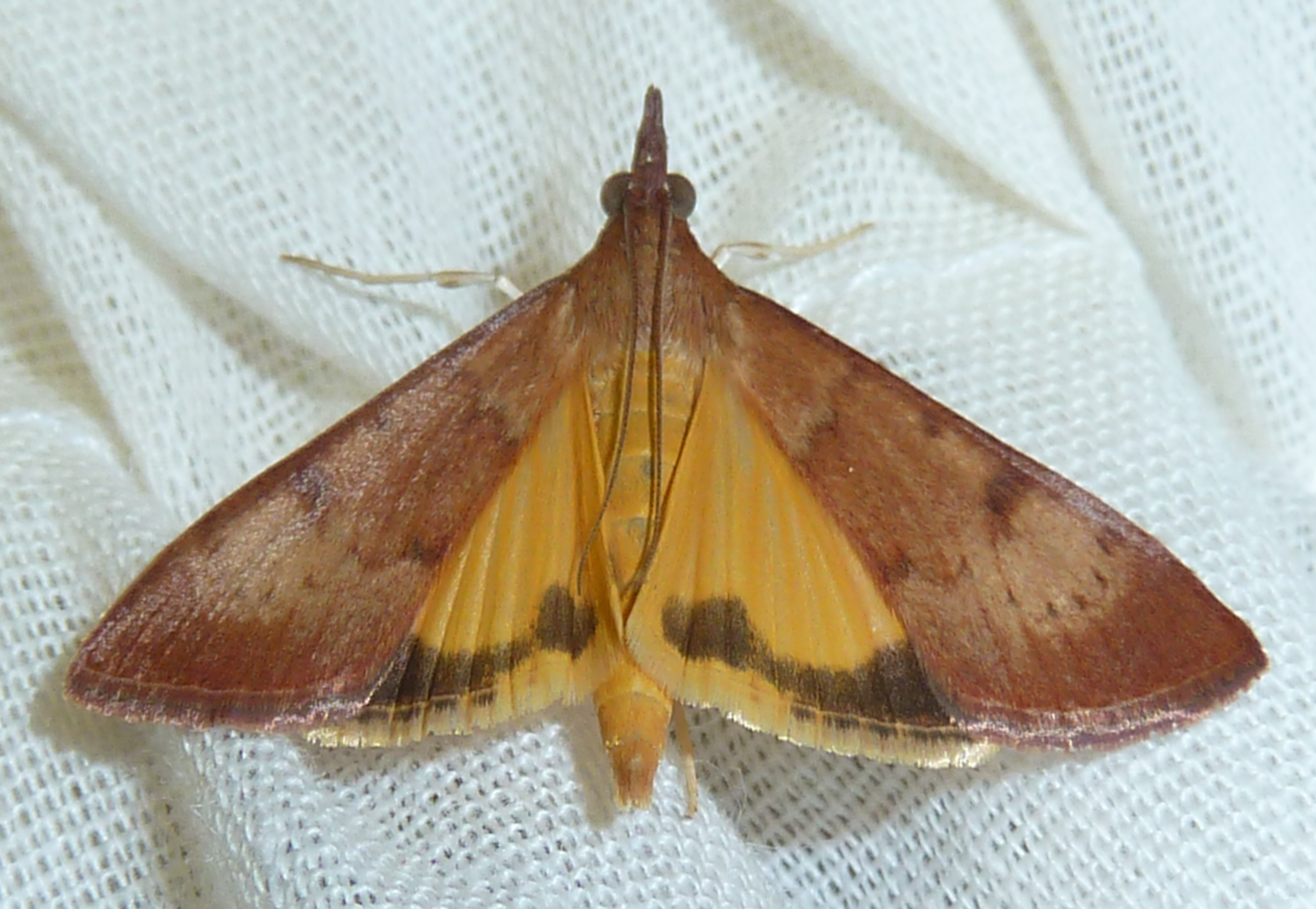

Scientific classification
- Kingdom: Animalia
- Phylum: Arthropoda
- Clade: Pancrustacea
- Class: Insecta
- Order: Lepidoptera
- Family: Crambidae
- Genus: Uresiphita
- Species: U. polygonalis

Binomial name
- Uresiphita polygonalis (Denis & Schiffermüller, 1775)

Synonyms
- Pyralis polygonalis Denis and Schiffermüller, 1775; Mecyna polygonalis; Pyralis limbalis Denis and Schiffermüller, 1775; Uresiphita limbalis; Mecyna virescens Butler, 1881; Uresiphita aversalis (Guenée, 1854); Uresiphita consanguinalis (Guenée, 1854); Uresiphita deprivalis (Walker, 1859); Uresiphita diversalis (Hübner, 1796); Uresiphita extinctalis Caradja, 1916; Uresiphita gilvata (Fabricius, 1794); Uresiphita ochrocrossa Clarke, 1971; Uresiphita orientalis (Fabricius, 1794); Uresiphita teriadalis (Guenée, 1854); Uresiphita villicalis (Hübner, 1826)

= Uresiphita polygonalis =

Species of moth

Uresiphita polygonalis is a moth of the family Crambidae. The species was described by Michael Denis and Ignaz Schiffermüller in 1775. It is found in the Pacific, including Hawaii and New Zealand, Sri Lanka, Europe and northern and southern Africa.

The wingspan is about 27 mm. Adults range in color from green to red.

Larval food plants are mainly quinolizidine-bearing tribes of Fabaceae, (Ulex europaeus, Genista sp., Sarothamnus sp., Sophoreae sp., Sophora tomentosa, Carmichaeliae and Genisteae). In Hawaii they have been recorded on Acacia koa and Sophora chrysophylla.

== Subspecies ==
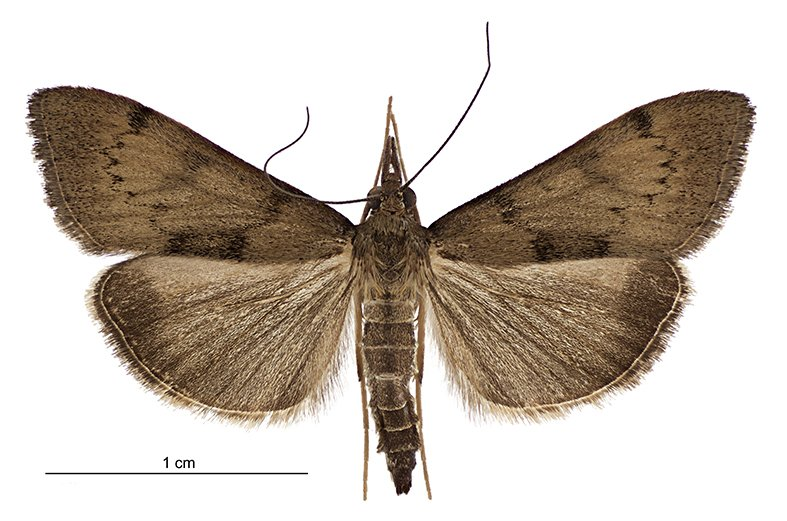
Uresiphita polygonalis maorialis

- Uresiphita polygonalis polygonalis
- Uresiphita polygonalis virescens (Butler, 1881) (Hawaii)
- Uresiphita polygonalis maorialis (Felder & Rogenhofer, 1875) (New Zealand)

=== Uresiphita polygonalis maorialis ===
This subspecies is endemic to New Zealand where it is also known as the kowhai moth. It is sometimes referred to under the species name Uresiphita maorialis. This subspecies occurs throughout New Zealand and its larvae feed on the endemic kowhai species as well as introduced tree lupin.
