= List of geckos of New Zealand =

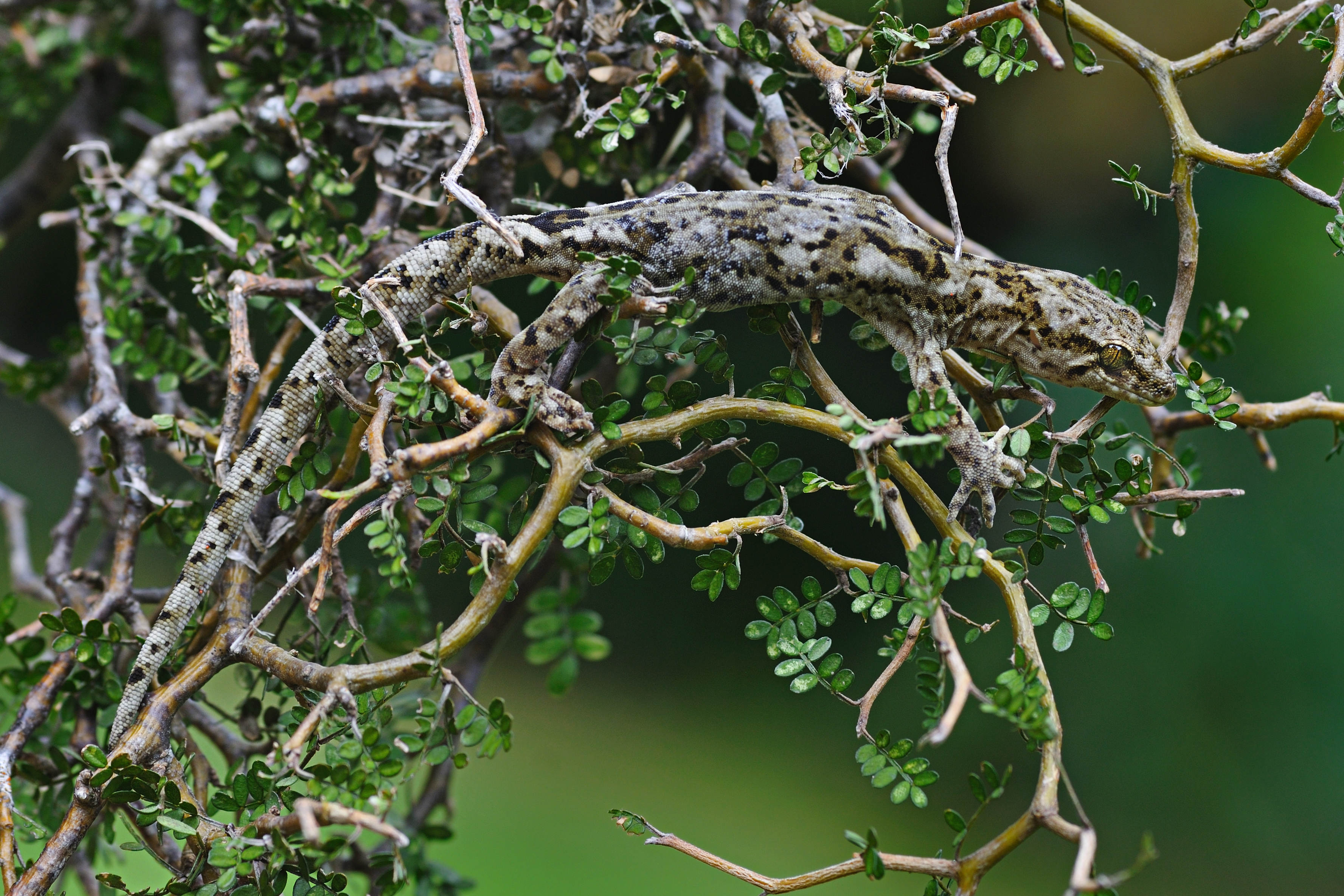
Jewelled gecko (Naultinus gemmeus)

Dozens of species of gecko are found in New Zealand. The exact number is unknown; as of 2021, there are 48 described species across 7 genera, with more being studied. All are native to New Zealand and are endemic (i.e., found nowhere else). All are placed in the Diplodactylidae family, which is found across Australia, New Caledonia and New Zealand.

New Zealand's geckos are highly unusual in that they are viviparous, giving birth to live young, typically twins; most other geckos are oviparous (egg-layers). Two species of the New Caledonian rough-snouted giant geckos are the only other viviparous geckos in the world.

Like most gecko species, New Zealand’s geckos are omnivorous, consuming a diet that is primarily insectivorous in nature, hunting numerous flies, arachnids, lepidoptorans and gryllids (crickets). However, depending on several factors (such as the time of year, seasonal insect availability, bloom cycles of flowering plants, etc.), many geckos will supplement—or even briefly alter—their diets by consuming blossoms, fruits (e.g., from mahoe) or nectar (e.g., from flax flowers) as it becomes available.

Geckos are often a target for wildlife smugglers for sale via the reptile and pet trade.

== Species ==
As of 2024 the taxonomically described species are as follows:

- Dactylocnemis pacificus (Gray, 1842) – Pacific gecko or Pacific sticky-toed gecko
- Hoplodactylus duvaucelii (Dumeril & Bibron, 1836) – Duvaucel's gecko. This may represent multiple species or subspecies, including the northern and the southern Duvaucel’s gecko.
- Mokopirirakau cryptozoicus (Jewell & Leschen, 2004) – Tākitimu gecko
- Mokopirirakau galaxias Knox et al., 2021 – hura te ao gecko
- Mokopirirakau granulatus (Gray, 1845) – forest gecko
- Mokopirirakau kahutarae (Whitaker, 1985) – black-eyed gecko
- Mokopirirakau nebulosus (McCann, 1955) – cloudy gecko
- Naultinus elegans Gray, 1842 – Auckland green gecko
- Naultinus flavirictus Hitchmough et al., 2021 – Aupouri green gecko
- Naultinus gemmeus (McCann, 1955) – jewelled gecko
- Naultinus grayii Bell, 1843 – Northland green gecko or Gray's tree gecko
- Naultinus manukanus (McCann, 1955) – Marlborough green gecko or manuka gecko
- Naultinus punctatus Gray, 1843 – Wellington green gecko
- Naultinus rudis (Fischer, 1882) – rough gecko
- Naultinus stellatus Hutton, 1872 – Nelson green gecko or starry tree gecko
- Naultinus tuberculatus (McCann, 1955) – West Coast green gecko, Lewis Pass green gecko, or warty tree gecko
- Toropuku inexpectatus Hitchmough et al., 2020 – northern striped gecko
- Toropuku stephensi (Robb, 1980) – Stephen's Island gecko or Cook Strait striped gecko
- Tukutuku rakiurae (Thomas, 1981) – harlequin gecko
- Woodworthia brunnea (Cope, 1869) – Canterbury gecko
- Woodworthia chrysosiretica (Robb, 1980) – gold-striped gecko, gold-stripe gecko, or golden sticky-toed gecko
- Woodworthia korowai Winkel et al., 2023 – korowai gecko, Muriwai gecko
- Woodworthia maculata (Gray, 1845) – New Zealand common gecko or Raukawa gecko

Gigarcanum delcourti (formerly Hoplodactylus delcourti), the largest known species of gecko, only known from a single specimen collected in the 19th century, was formerly thought to have been from New Zealand, but DNA evidence suggests that it actually originated from New Caledonia.

== Species yet to be taxonomically determined ==
The number of New Zealand gecko species is not settled, with new ones being described. Some animals with a wide range previously thought to comprise a single species actually represent multiple sub-species, as with the common gecko, Woodworthia maculata. A number of alpine species have emerged from high altitude discoveries in the South Island.

As at 2021 the species or subspecies that have yet to be taxonomically determined include:

- Dactylocnemis "Matapia Island" – Matapia gecko
- Dactylocnemis "Mokohinau" – Mokohinau gecko
- Dactylocnemis "North Cape" – Te Paki gecko
- Dactylocnemis "Poor Knights" – Poor Knights gecko
- Dactylocnemis "Three Kings" – Three Kings gecko
- Hoplodactylus duvaucelii "southern" – a possible new species or subspecies currently included in Hoplodactylus duvaucelii
- Mokopirirakau "Cascades" – cascade gecko
- Mokopirirakau "cupola" – Cupola gecko
- Mokopirirakau "Okarito" – broad-cheeked gecko
- Mokopirirakau "Open Bay Islands" – Open Bay Islands gecko
- Mokopirirakau "Roys Peak" – orange-spotted gecko
- Mokopirirakau "southern forest" – Tautuku gecko
- Mokopirirakau "southern North Island" – ngahere gecko
- Woodworthia cf. brunnea Cope, 1869 – Waitaha gecko
- Woodworthia "Central Otago" – schist gecko
- Woodworthia "Cromwell" – Kawarau gecko
- Woodworthia "Kaikoura" – Kaikoura gecko
- Woodworthia "Marlborough mini" – minimac gecko
- Woodworthia "Mount Arthur" – Kahurangi gecko
- Woodworthia "Otago/Southland large" – korero gecko
- Woodworthia "pygmy" – pygmy gecko
- Woodworthia "Raggedy" – Raggedy Range gecko
- Woodworthia "Southern Alps" – Southern Alps gecko
- Woodworthia "Southern Alps northern" – northern Southern Alps gecko
- Woodworthia "southern mini" – short-toed gecko
- Woodworthia "south-western" – south-western large gecko

== See also ==
- Wildlife smuggling in New Zealand
- Fauna of New Zealand
