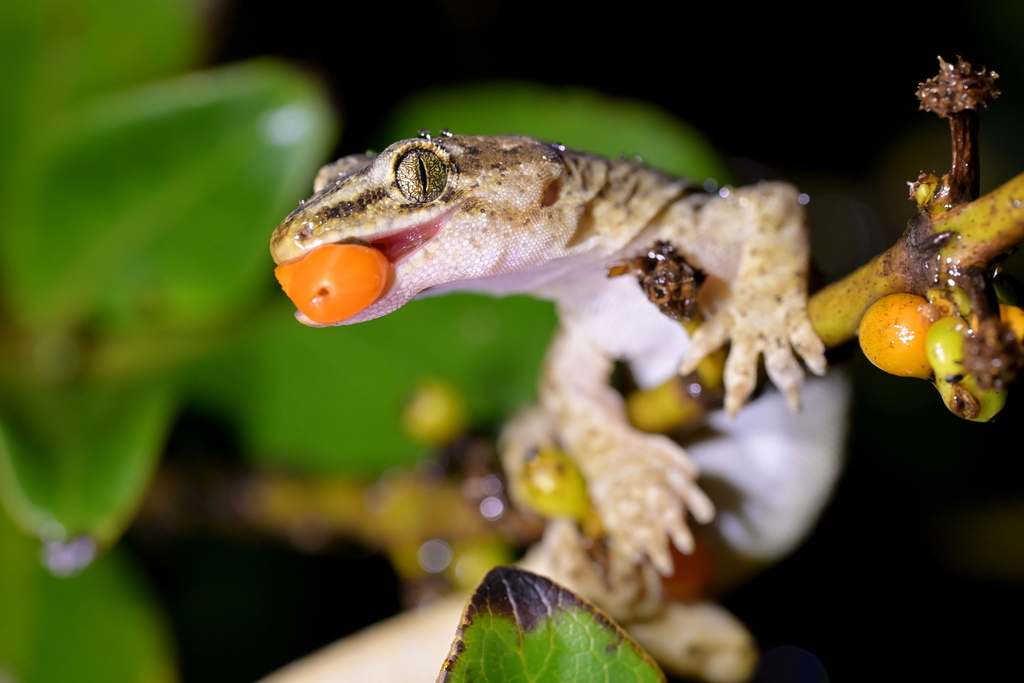
- Woodworthia maculata seen in the Wellington Region

Conservation status
- Least Concern (IUCN 3.1)
- CITES Appendix III

Scientific classification
- Kingdom: Animalia
- Phylum: Chordata
- Class: Reptilia
- Order: Squamata
- Suborder: Gekkota
- Family: Diplodactylidae
- Genus: Woodworthia
- Species: W. maculata

Binomial name
- Woodworthia maculata (Gray, 1845)
- Distribution of Woodworthia maculata in New Zealand Known native range

Synonyms
- Naultinus maculatus Gray, 1845; Hoplodactylus maculatus; Woodworthia maculatus

= Woodworthia maculata =

Species of lizard

Woodworthia maculata, also known as the New Zealand common gecko or Raukawa gecko, is a species in the family Diplodactylidae. The species is endemic to New Zealand.

== Taxonomy ==
The species was first mentioned by John Edward Gray in 1845 as Naultinus maculatus. Gray's mention lacked a description and referenced manuscript notes, so it is unclear if Gray considered N. maculatus to be a synonym of Naultinus pacificus. The first formal description of the species was written by George Albert Boulenger in 1885, which he described as Hoplodactylus maculatus. Its status as a distinct species was undetermined until 1977. The species was first described as a member of the genus Woodworthia (as Woodworthia maculatus) by herpetologist Tony R. Jewell in A Photographic Guide to Reptiles & Amphibians of New Zealand (2008), a distinction that was supported by phylogenetic analysis of New Zealand gecko species.

The specific name maculata means "speckled", referring to the speckled pattern seen on this species.

== Description ==
W. maculata is a small to medium-sized gecko, with an average length of 155 mm (6.1 in), and has a predominant colour of grey or brown. The eyes are a greenish brown, with the snout-to-eye distance slightly longer, or equal to, the eye-to-ear distance. 'The mouth is lined in pink and has a pink tongue with a grey tip. W. maculata often occupies the same area as a few similar looking geckos; Dactylocnemis pacificus and W. chrysosireticus. W. maculata can be distinguished from W. chrysosireticus by the lack of black speckles which are seen on W. chrysosireticus. W. maculata differs from D. pacificus when looking closely at the nostril. In maculata the nostril scale is not in contact with the nostril, but in D. pacificus it is in contact. The species can be distinguished from the korowai gecko due to different ranges, as the korowai gecko is found exclusively on the west coast of the Auckland Region, and due to Woodworthia maculata having longer distal phalanges.

Individuals in the South Island are often more slender and darker in colour than those in the North Island.

== Range ==
W. maculata can be found in the North Island of New Zealand, and northern sections of the South Island. The species is widely distributed in the lower North Island and in the Gisborne District. Further north, the species is exclusively found on the eastern Pacific coast of the Bay of Plenty, Coromandel Peninsula, Auckland Region and Northland. In addition, the species can be found in many offshore islands of the Cook Strait and Hauraki Gulf.

== Habitat preferences ==
W. maculata is terrestrial but is often found in trees, only in forested areas. A study by H. Frank and DJ Wilson (2011) showed that W. maculata is also commonly found in rocky areas with cracks and crevices, without a permanent shade cover. Few individuals were detected in highly grazed areas with no grass cover remaining.

In the Hauraki Gulf, the geckos are commonly found on stony beaches and are a smaller size, with crenulated longitudinal stripes. W. maculata are found in the Coromandel and central North Island are generally found in lowland forests and are much larger, as well as being of various colours. The Southern North Island populations appear to be two-thirds smaller than nearby populations and exhibit sexual dimorphism. Populations which occupy the Cook Strait and nearby mainland's show to be a mix of the common Northern and Southern forms.

== Life cycle ==
W. maculata has been found to have a characteristically long lifespan, with a suggested lifespan of 20 years. Some individuals have been aged at 29 years. A more recent study proposes that the species may live up to 37 years in the wild. It has been suggested that W. maculata may have a long lifespan to balance their slow reproductive rate.

== Diet ==
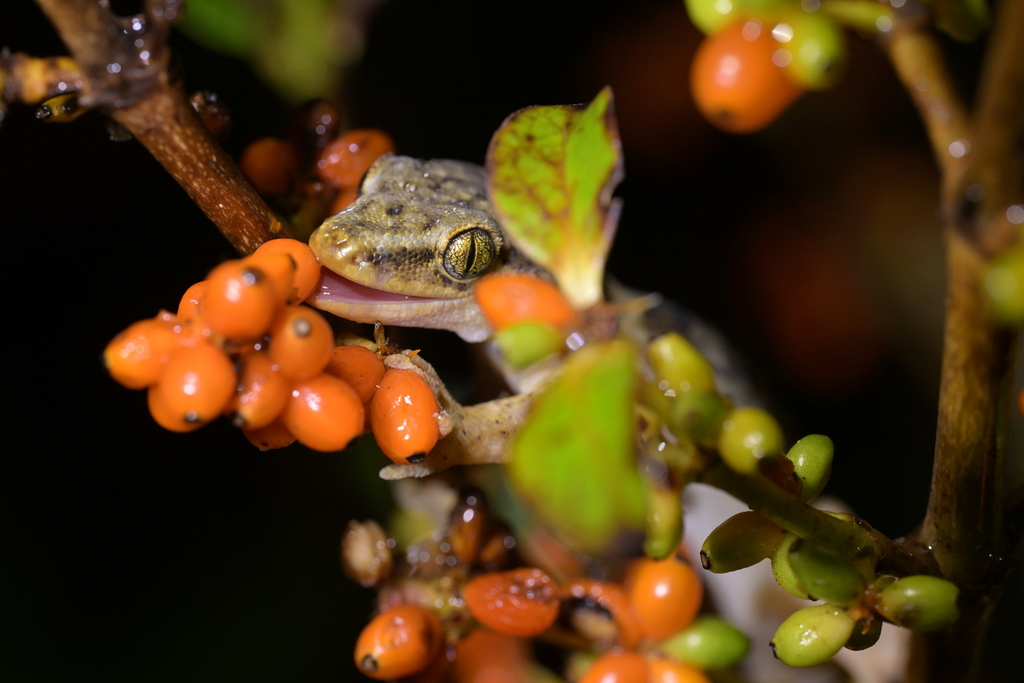
Raukawa gecko eating berries

Geckos have a simple diet of live insects and smaller organisms. The diet of a gecko includes, but is not limited to, spiders, isopodas, moths, flies, grasshoppers and caterpillars. As expected, due to an individual's size and preference, the diet has a lot of variation. In other gecko species, the tail acts as a storage organ which can hold reserves of fat which the individual can use in times of food scarcity. Most gecko species cannot digest leaves and other tough plant material easily, however W. maculata and other New Zealand gecko species feed off plant material that is easily digestible and high in energy like pollen, nectar, sap or fruit. Mainland geckos are commonly preyed on invasive species such as stoats, cats, hedgehogs and rodents. On off-shore islands where these invasive species are not present, the morepork is considered the main predator. Rodents will eat both the adult gecko and their young. Although W. maculata are too small to fight them off, their heads are too big to fit in gaps small enough in which they would be safe from the predator. Cree found that W. maculata reproduces annually and has evidence to suggest that some populations may be reproducing biannually. Cree also recognised that on average, each female produces less than 2 offspring per year and are slow to mature.

== Conservation status ==
As of 2021, the Department of Conservation (DOC) classified the common gecko as Not Threatened under the New Zealand Threat Classification System.
