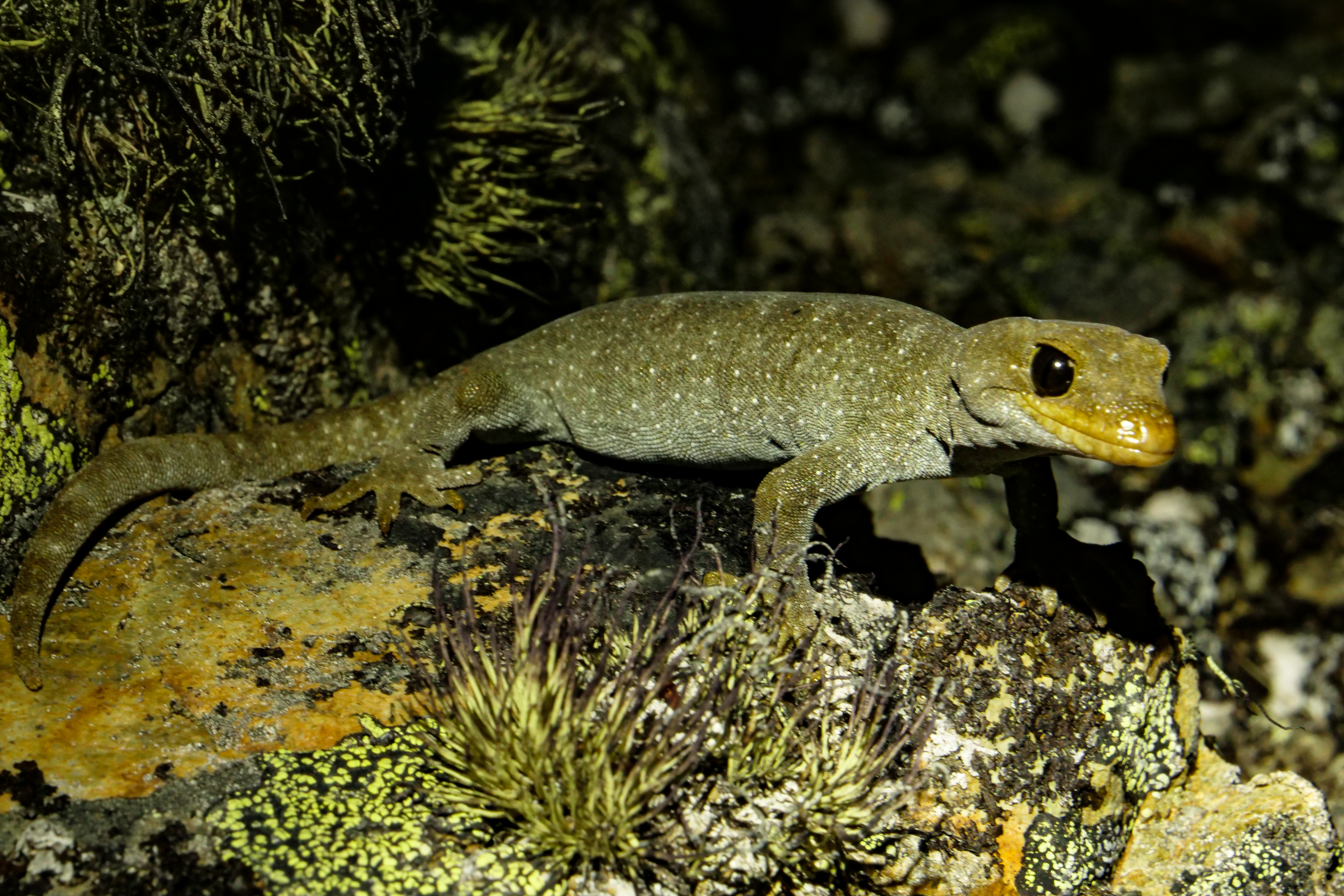

Conservation status
- CITES Appendix III

Scientific classification
- Kingdom: Animalia
- Phylum: Chordata
- Class: Reptilia
- Order: Squamata
- Suborder: Gekkota
- Family: Diplodactylidae
- Genus: Mokopirirakau
- Species: M. galaxias

Binomial name
- Mokopirirakau galaxias Knox, Hitchmough, Nielsen, Jewell, & Bell, 2021
- Distribution of Mokopirirakau galaxias on a map of the South Island Known native range

= Mokopirirakau galaxias =

Species of lizard

Mokopirirakau galaxias is a species of gecko that is endemic to New Zealand. Its Māori name is hura te ao. It is in the family Diplodactylidae. Genetic analysis suggests that its closest relatives are the clade comprising the forest gecko (Mokopirirakau granulatus) and the black-eyed gecko (Mokopirirakau kahutarae).

It was discovered in 2018 in alpine greywacke rock outcrops in North Otago. It has been found in two mountain ranges in the Oteake Conservation Park. The holotype was collected in the Ida Range.

This gecko is nocturnal, and is notable for the small bright spots on its back that resemble stars.

== See also ==
- Geckos of New Zealand
