= Cupola gecko =

Scientific classification
- Domain: Eukaryota
- Kingdom: Animalia
- Phylum: Chordata
- Class: Reptilia
- Order: Squamata
- Infraorder: Gekkota
- Family: Diplodactylidae
- Genus: Mokopirirakau
- Species: M. granulatus

Binomial name
- Mokopirirakau "Cupola"

Species of lizard

The Cupola gecko is a rare variant of the forest gecko (Mokopirirakau granulatus). Confirmed sightings were made only in 1968, 2007 and March 2021, at which time it was suspected to be a separate but undescribed species, named Mokopirirakau "Cupola" until it could be described. DNA testing later in 2021 showed it to be Mokopirirakau granulatus.

It was called Cupola after the Cupola Basin in the Nelson Lakes National Park where it was first found. It has only been confirmed to be present in the Cupola Basin and the adjacent Sabine Valley in the Nelson Lakes National Park.

In March 2021, 53 years after the first sighting, and 14 years after the last confirmed sighting, four Cupola geckos, including a pregnant female, were found in the Sabine Valley in an expedition headed by herpetologist Ben Barr.

== Description ==
Very few recorded specimens of the Cupola gecko exist. It is similar in appearance to other forest geckos, having a grey-brown colour with dark W- or V-shaped bands or blotches. It differs in that it has a shorter snout and a triangular shaped head with V-shaped markings. It has a speckled undersurface, a bright orange mouth lining, and grey/brown eyes. The sizes of adult specimens are unknown, but probably measure around 70–85 mm. Juveniles are dark grey-brown with grey chevron markings and scattered spots of mustard yellow.

== Distribution ==
The Cupola gecko is known only in the Cupola Basin and the Sabine Valley. The first Cupola Basin specimen was found in a scrubby boulder field not far above the Cupola Basin hut.

== Conservation status ==
The Department of Conservation classified the Cupola gecko as Data Deficient under the New Zealand Threat Classification System, then changed to Taxonomically Indistinct after the DNA testing.

== See also ==
- Geckos of New Zealand
