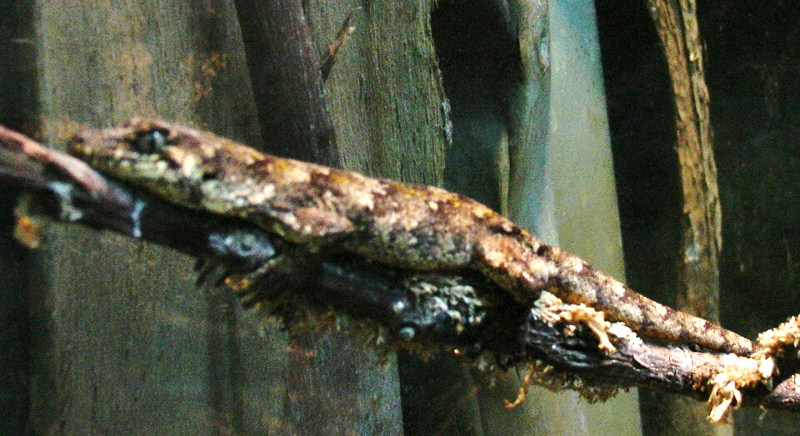
- Forest gecko (M. granulatus)

Scientific classification
- Kingdom: Animalia
- Phylum: Chordata
- Class: Reptilia
- Order: Squamata
- Suborder: Gekkota
- Family: Diplodactylidae
- Genus: Mokopirirakau; Nielsen, Bauer, Jackman, Hitchmough & Daugherty, 2011

= Mokopirirakau =

Cryptic Gecko Genus in New Zealand

Mokopirirakau is a genus of geckos that are endemic to New Zealand. They range from arboreal species that live in forest trees down to the coastline, to terrestrial species that live on rocky ground in the alpine zone, and species that live in both habitats. They are spread throughout the country.

The genus was erected in 2011, when the New Zealand geckos were reorganised into seven genera based on DNA sequencing; the then scientifically described Mokopirirakau species had previously been in the Hoplodactylus genus. There are thought to be eleven species, but only five have been scientifically described so far.

== Taxonomy ==
The Mokopirirakau genus was erected in 2011, when the New Zealand geckos were reorganised into seven genera based on DNA sequencing. The then scientifically described Mokopirirakau species had previously been in the Hoplodactylus genus, and were known as the Hoplodactylus aff. granulatus complex. The name Mokopirirakau is from the Māori words moko 'lizard', piri 'cling', rākau 'tree', and thus means "lizards that cling to trees".

There are five described and named species, and at least as many probable species (with names below in quotation marks) waiting to be described.

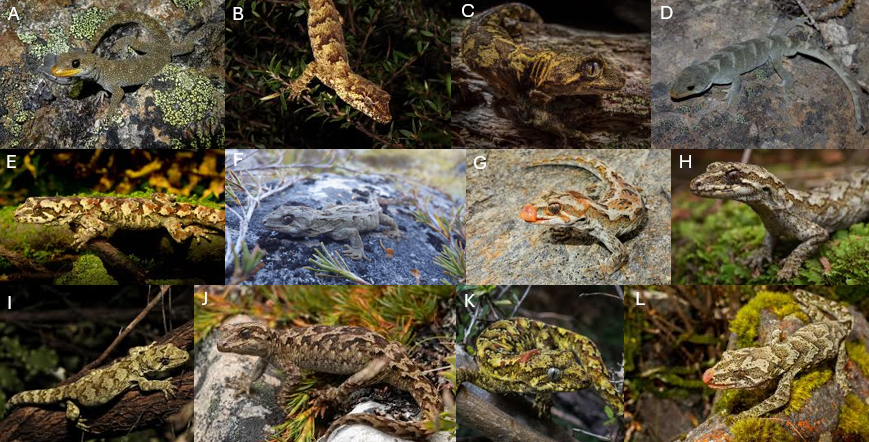

- Mokopirirakau cryptozoicus (Jewell & Leschen, 2004) – Tākitimu gecko
- Mokopirirakau galaxias Knox et al., 2021 – hura te ao gecko
- Mokopirirakau granulatus (Gray, 1845) – forest gecko
- Mokopirirakau kahutarae (Whitaker, 1985) – black-eyed gecko
- Mokopirirakau nebulosus (McCann, 1955) – cloudy gecko
- Mokopirirakau "Cascades" – Cascades gecko
- Mokopirirakau "Ōkārito" – broad-cheeked gecko
- Mokopirirakau "Open Bay Islands" – Open Bay Islands gecko
- Mokopirirakau "Roys Peak" – orange-spotted gecko
- Mokopirirakau "southern forest" – Tautuku gecko
- Mokopirirakau "southern North Island" – ngahere gecko

== Description ==
The Mokopirirakau, Naultinus and Tukutuku genera are distinguished from other New Zealand geckos by their narrow toes, straight or only slightly curved thin toe pads, and mouth colour, which is yellow and/or dark blue to black. These geckos are cryptically coloured, that is, they have complex colourations (which generally serve a purpose in camouflage or signalling). Some, like Mokopirirakau galaxias, have unique colourations that could be used for signalling, although there has been little to no research into this hypothesis. Especially unique yellow mouth colouration gives Mokopirirakau galaxias its Māori name, "Hura Te Ao", or "reveal the world", because of how it looks like the break of dawn. Different colourations in geckos may also be attributed to thermoregulation (regulating their body temperatures), but this has not been explored with Mokopirirakau geckos yet. These geckos do not have specific specialised snout lengths or bite strengths as would be seen in herbivorous lizards, because they have an omnivorous diet. Mokopirirakau geckos have very different maxillae (the bones that make up the top of the jaw) to Woodworthia and Hoplodactylus geckos, and are more similar to those of Naultinus and Dactylocnemis.

Mokopirirakau "Southern North Island" may be sexually dimorphic in size, with the biggest female measuring 8 millimetres longer than the biggest male in a study. Sexual size dimorphism occurs in other New Zealand geckos also.

== Habitat ==
Mokopirirakau geckos live in forests and alpine areas throughout most of the country. Their habitat varies a lot, even within species. Some of the species are well adapted to the extremely cold temperatures and harsh conditions of mountainous environments, possibly including reproductive adaptations.

Outside factors such as the impact of humans can have a large effect on their home ranges. Mokopirirakau "Southern Forest" have coped with substantial forest clearance by surviving in small, isolated fragments of undisturbed forest, making conservation efforts important. Most New Zealand geckos have strong site fidelity (staying in the same location for extended periods of time).

== Behaviour ==
Geckos are generally assumed to be omnivorous, as are the other lizards in New Zealand. However, more research is needed to definitively conclude what Mokopirirakau geckos eat. Some eat fruit and/or nectar, but others are not known to.

Geckos in New Zealand have been generally assumed to be mostly nocturnal. However, Mokopirirakau "Southern North Island" have been observed to emerge as much in the day as in the night, and to travel further in the day, so more research is needed to reevaluate assumptions about Mokopirirakau activity phases. Surveying methods for lizards have been improved through the use of trail cameras, rather than relying on in-person sampling, which shows promise for future research.

Mokopirirakau geckos may be arboreal (live in trees), terrestrial (live on the ground) or live in both habitats. Some species are found on the trunks and branches of trees and shrubs. This may make them vulnerable to introduced arboreal predators – ship rats and stoats specifically. Mokopirirakau geckos often use retreats only during bad weather, relying on camouflage otherwise.

== Reproduction ==
Mokopirirakau "Southern North Island" appears to have the highest reproductive rate of all geckos in New Zealand, which shows promise for population regeneration. Females in the "Roys Peak" species appear to have higher daytime body temperatures while reproducing than males or females who were not reproducing. This could be an adaptation to the extreme alpine temperatures to support reproduction in harsh conditions while reproduction is already difficult. The relationship between pregnancy and thermoregulation in this species, and New Zealand reptiles in general, has not yet been fully explored and would benefit from more research.

== Threats ==
Many of the Mokopirirakau geckos have become endangered since humans arrived in New Zealand, through deforestation and predation by introduced animals, especially mammals. Predation of lizards is not only by introduced species – native birds also prey on them – but introduced mammalian predators are the bigger concern in conservation of native lizards. New Zealand is well known for clearing islands of introduced mammalian predators, and one tool for conservation of threatened native species is translocation to islands free of such predators. Research conducted to test methodology has shown promising results. A factor that needs to be considered is how best to release the geckos, as they performed differently based on how much support they were given in the new environment. Geckos that were "hard released" had larger home ranges than geckos that were supported and kept in pens after release. Another consideration is how alpine species will be affected by a switch in environments, especially to temperatures warmer than they are used to.
