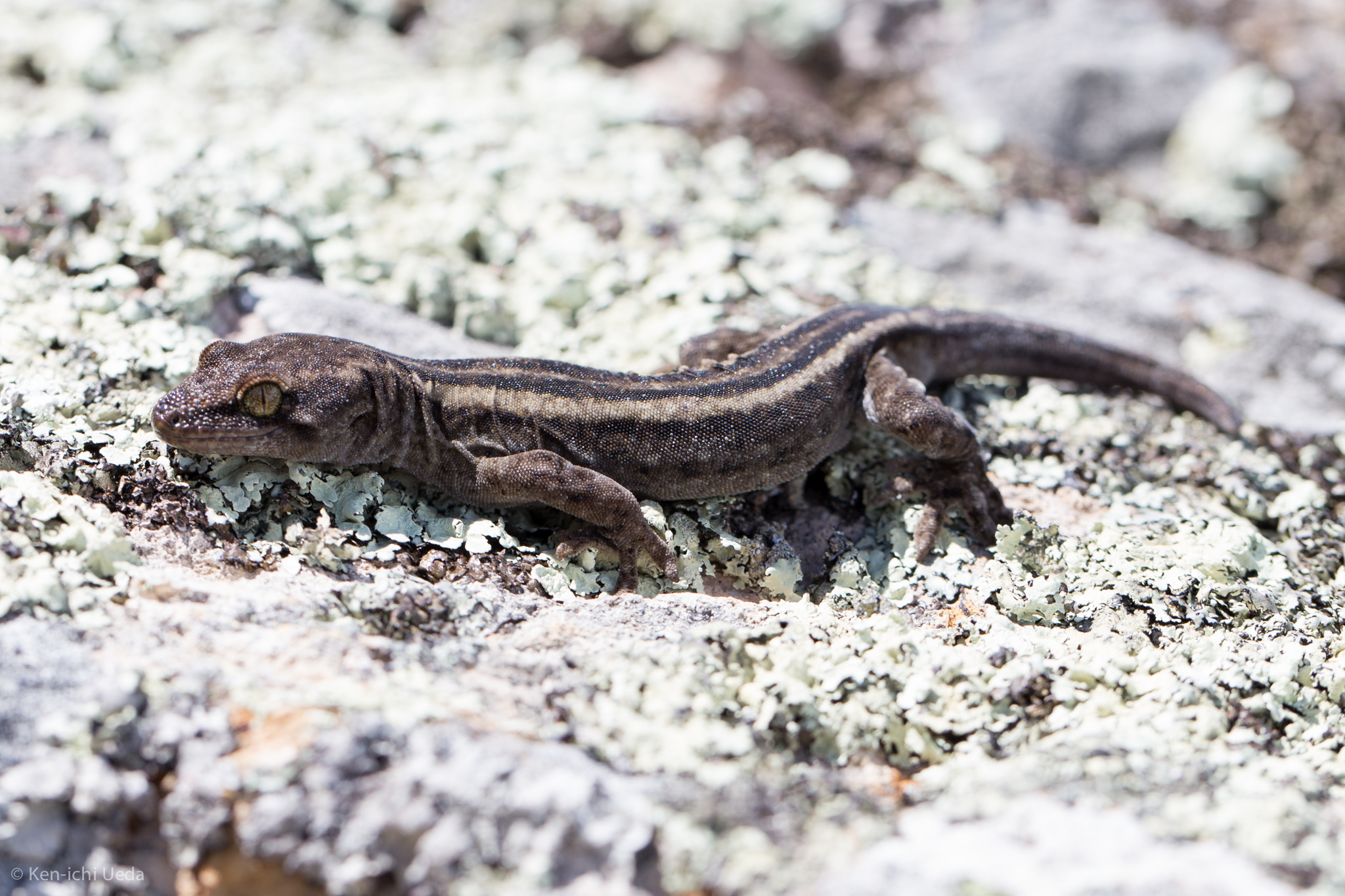

Conservation status
- Endangered (IUCN 3.1)
- CITES Appendix III

Scientific classification
- Kingdom: Animalia
- Phylum: Chordata
- Class: Reptilia
- Order: Squamata
- Suborder: Gekkota
- Family: Diplodactylidae
- Genus: Woodworthia
- Species: W. brunnea

Binomial name
- Woodworthia brunnea (Cope, 1869)
- Distribution of the Canterbury gecko on a map of the South Island Known native range

Synonyms
- Pentadactylus brunneus; Aeluroscalabotes brunneus; Woodworthia brunneus

= Canterbury gecko =

Species of lizard

The Canterbury gecko (Woodworthia brunnea) is a gecko found in the South Island of New Zealand. It is also known by the Māori names Waitaha gecko and Moko-pāpā, and as the brown gecko. It had previously been placed in a different genus and called Hoplodactylus brunneus, but further study split the genus Hoplodactylus into six genera, with some groups close to the former Hoplodactylus maculatus "Canterbury" being assigned to the new genus Woodworthia.

The forms are separated geographically but have evolved from a common ancestor. Woodworthia geckos belong to the subfamily Diplodactylidae, known to be a primitive group found only in Australia, New Caledonia and New Zealand. The significant differences between New Zealand and Australian Diplodactylids may suggest that geckos have been in New Zealand since it broke away from the Gondwana supercontinent 85 million years ago. The geckos are usually brown and highly patterned, including striped morphs. The eye colour ranges from green, brown to bright yellow and they can occur over a variety of habitats including dune-lands, forests, shrublands, river terraces and bluffs. The gecko is endemic to New Zealand.

== Species description and identification ==
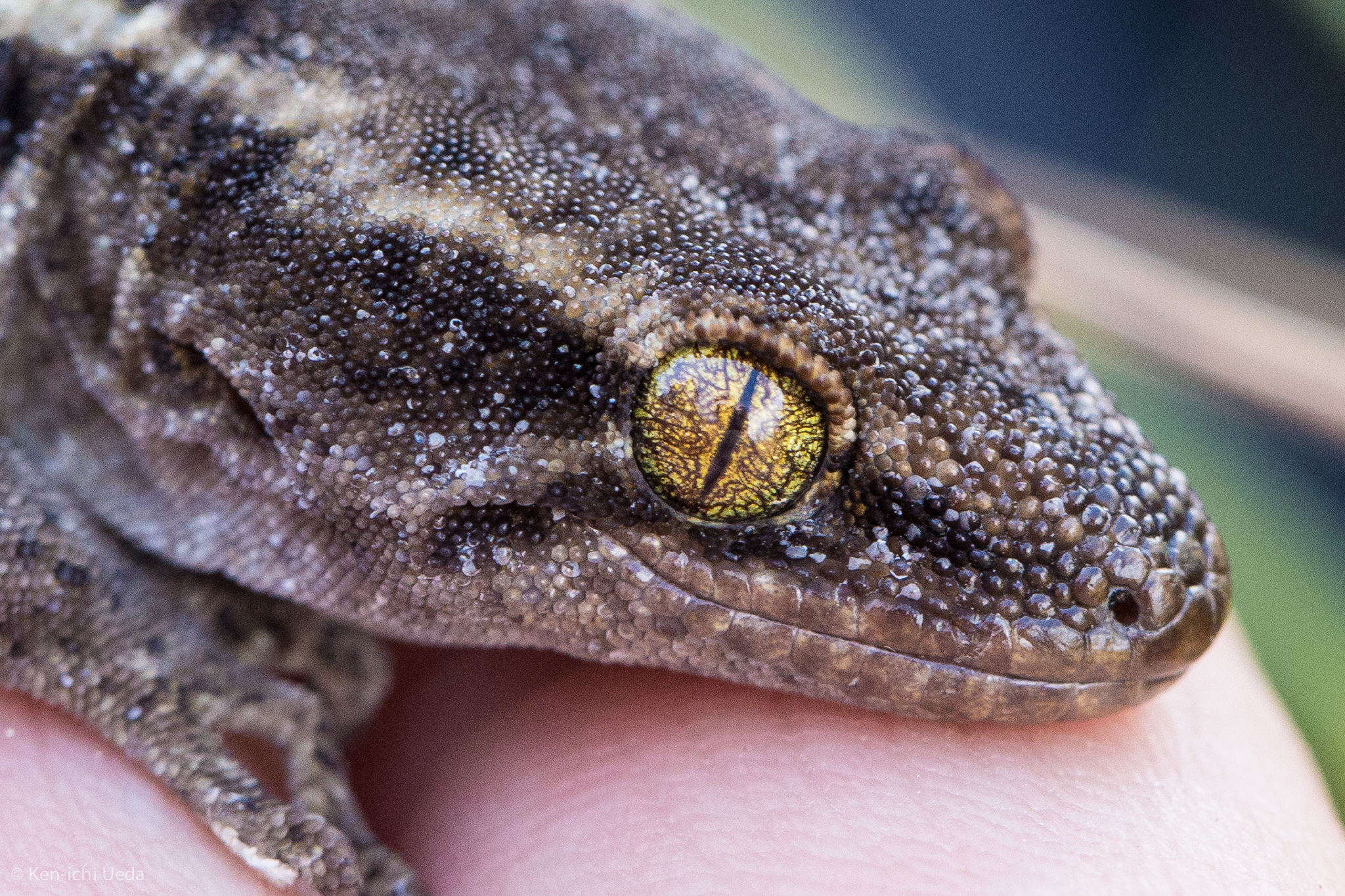
Close-up of the head

Geckos are specialised lizards, with large eyes that are permanently open, and large fleshy tongues that are used to clean the eyes and scales of the lips. They have "broad scale-like plates on the lower surfaces of their toes which employ millions of microscopic setae (hair-like structures), each with an attracting magnetic force" that gives adhesion to smooth surfaces. Woodworthia gecko species are often darker in colour than other New Zealand gecko species. Canterbury geckos are usually brown, grey or olive with pale bands, blotches or stripes that are bright, and large blackish patches (often on the intact tail).

The eye colour varies from green to brown to bright yellow and they usually have a narrow or broad pale stripe running from eye to nostril. The rostral scale contacts or virtually touches the nostril. Their undersides are usually pale and uniform in colour, although a few individuals have been observed with spotted bellies. They have pink mouths with a pink tongue that is tipped with grey. It has been observed that specimens from coastal dune habitats are smaller than those from forest/rocky habitats, measuring around 53–68 mm (2.1–2.7 in) between snout and vent, as opposed to 53–80 mm (2.1–3.1 in). Their tail length is usually the same as snout-vent length when intact. Canterbury gecko toes have "9-12 lamellae" and straight distal phalanges, while the soles of their feet are usually light grey. They can be highly variable in colour and patterning which may explain the difficulties in classifying them as their own species in earlier years.

== Geographic distribution and habitat ==
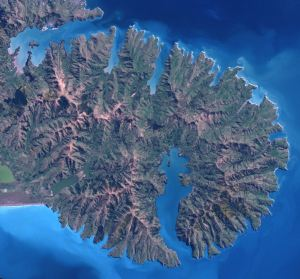
Canterbury geckos are more commonly found around the Banks Peninsula

Canterbury gecko are a species endemic to the South Island of New Zealand, from southern Marlborough to mid-Canterbury and the Banks Peninsula. They are also found inland in the Canterbury plains and on coastal hills south to around the Rakaia River. They have been observed on Kaitorete spit in their smaller dune-land size. Around the Banks Peninsula and the Port Hills, they are locally abundant but have been lost in many parts of the Canterbury plains due to habitat loss/land use change.

The Canterbury gecko has a range of habitat preferences primarily in lowland areas which include trees in forests as they retreat to sites beneath loose bark or in deep hallows especially in standing dead trees. They also live in creviced rock outcrops, rock tumbles, bluffs and associated scrubby vegetation as well as dune lands among driftwood, scrub, rocks and pohuehue, and along coastlines, especially Birdlings Flat/Kaitorete Spit.

The climate around the Banks Peninsula consists of an average rainfall of around 969 mm (38.1 in) per year, as the rainfall in New Zealand varies quite a bit we can see that the geckos prefer the East Coast compared to the West Coast as it is a lot drier on the East. The average temperature ranges from a high of 23 degrees to a low of 4 degrees in summer and a high of 13 degrees to a low of 2 degrees in winter. Canterbury has around 2100–2300 hours of sunshine annually. The Canterbury gecko exhibits high site fidelity and has very small home range. They have also adapted to widespread habitat modifications and can be seen in shelterbelts and other wild areas in the agricultural landscape.

Canterbury geckos are a generalist/facultative species, as they inhabit the coastal, lowland, and montane/subalpine regions of the South Island, in a wide variety of habitats. They are restricted below the tree line in most areas. On predator-free islands, they have been found inhabiting seabird burrows and can be found frequently in modified environments such as inorganic debris and buildings, close to human habitation. Small-leaved coprosmas are a favourite of New Zealand lizard species, as they offer a protective habitat in their tangled branches. Pohuehue (Muehlenbeckia complexa) is another favourite, as many invertebrates are found on it, and the fruit is ideal for lizards.

The New Zealand Department of Conservation has them listed as "bio status category: Indigenous (Endemic)", with a New Zealand threat classification of declining.

== Life cycle/phenology ==
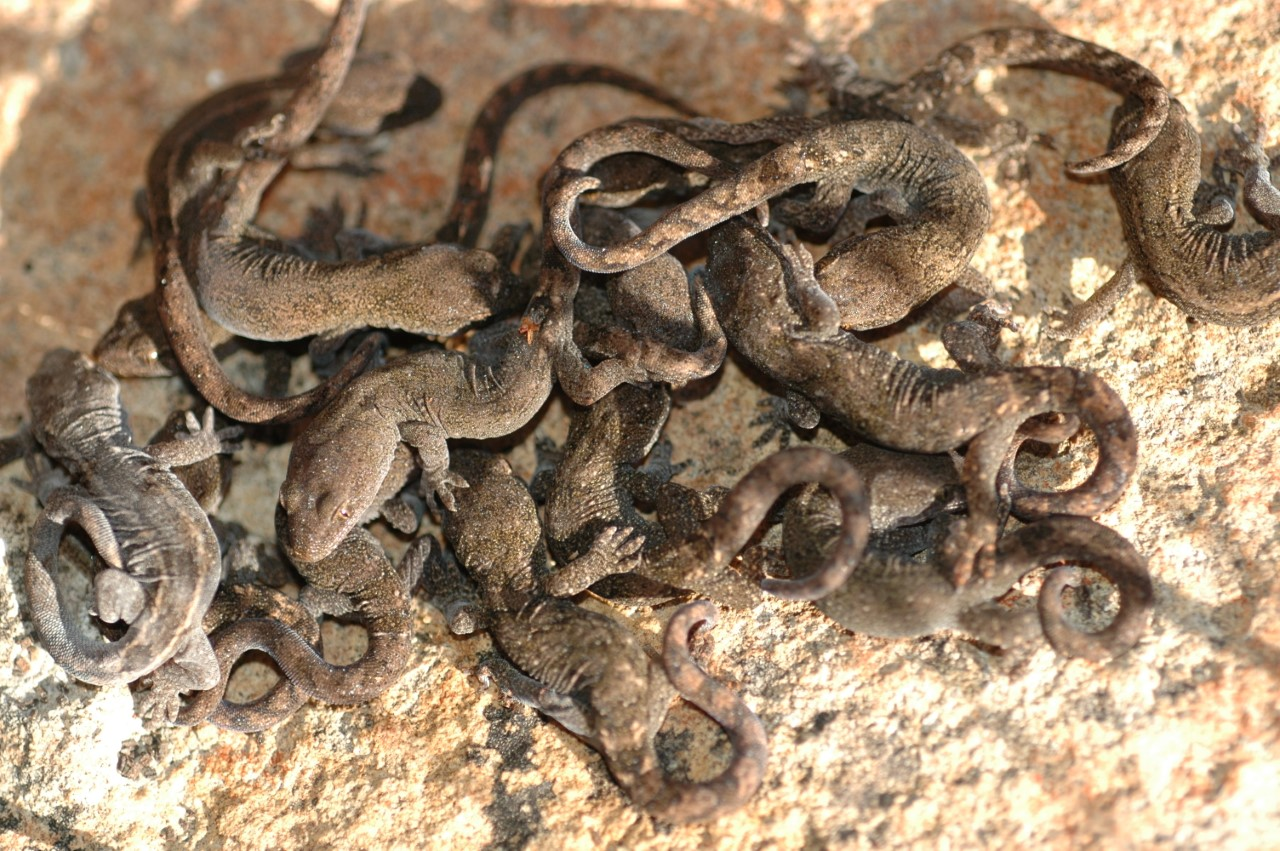
Baby Canterbury geckos

Among New Zealand species of geckos and skinks, females will typically mate and begin vitellogenesis in autumn, storing the sperm over winter and ovulating in the spring. The pregnancy usually lasts around three months, although gestation length may reach 14 months as it is temperature dependent. This quality is especially the case for nocturnally foraging species such as the Canterbury gecko Cree & Hare state in 'New Zealand Lizards' that "male geckos and skinks exhibit spermiogenesis during summer and/or autumn, with prolonged or continuous spermatocytogenesis and no period of complete testicular regression." Lizards in cool climates in South America and Tasmania exhibit similar features to the New Zealand species, such as "autumn mating with prolonged vitellogenesis, [the] possibility of a secondary mating season in spring, prolonged pregnancies with sometimes less-than-annual reproduction in females". Native geckos (and skinks) reach sexual maturity and start to reproduce around three years of age, with variations according to species and condition. The main determining factor in the ability to mate appears to be size. There have been cases of geckos in captivity that have mated and produced viable progeny at two years of age, although their first birth is often one hatchling rather than the norm of two.

Canterbury geckos are primarily nocturnal but have been known to sun bake at the entrance to their retreats. They often form large social aggregations, especially in areas without predators where they are abundant in numbers. The Canterbury gecko is known to have the highest recorded longevity of any New Zealand gecko species, at 53 years of age in the wild. Young are born in late February to March, with females often giving birth to a maximum litter of two. They are viviparous, meaning the eggs hatch in the female's oviduct before the young are born - "Vivipary is thought to be an adaptation to New Zealand's cooling climate during the ice ages – most other viviparous lizards occur in colder regions of the world". They mate once a year, usually in spring or summer. "Geckos are very responsive to the influence of temperature and in cooler climates will draw out the reproductive cycle", with females sometimes producing a litter every second or third year instead of every year. They are thermoregulators, basking in the sun either directly or through a thin cover object, and many New Zealand geckos and frogs can lighten or darken their colouration to enable the absorption of thermal energy.

== Diet ==
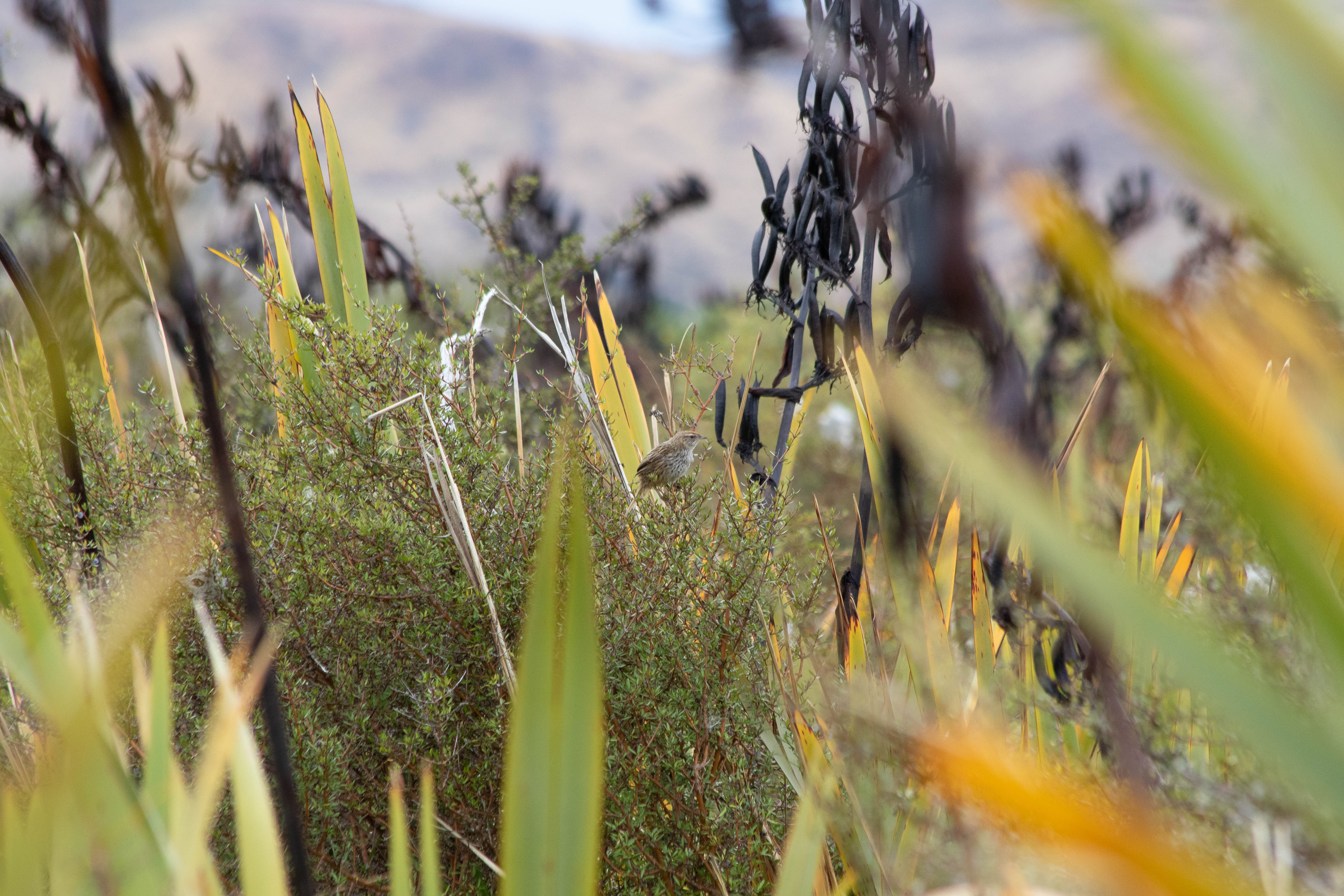
Harakeke (flax) and mingimingi (Coprosma propinqua)

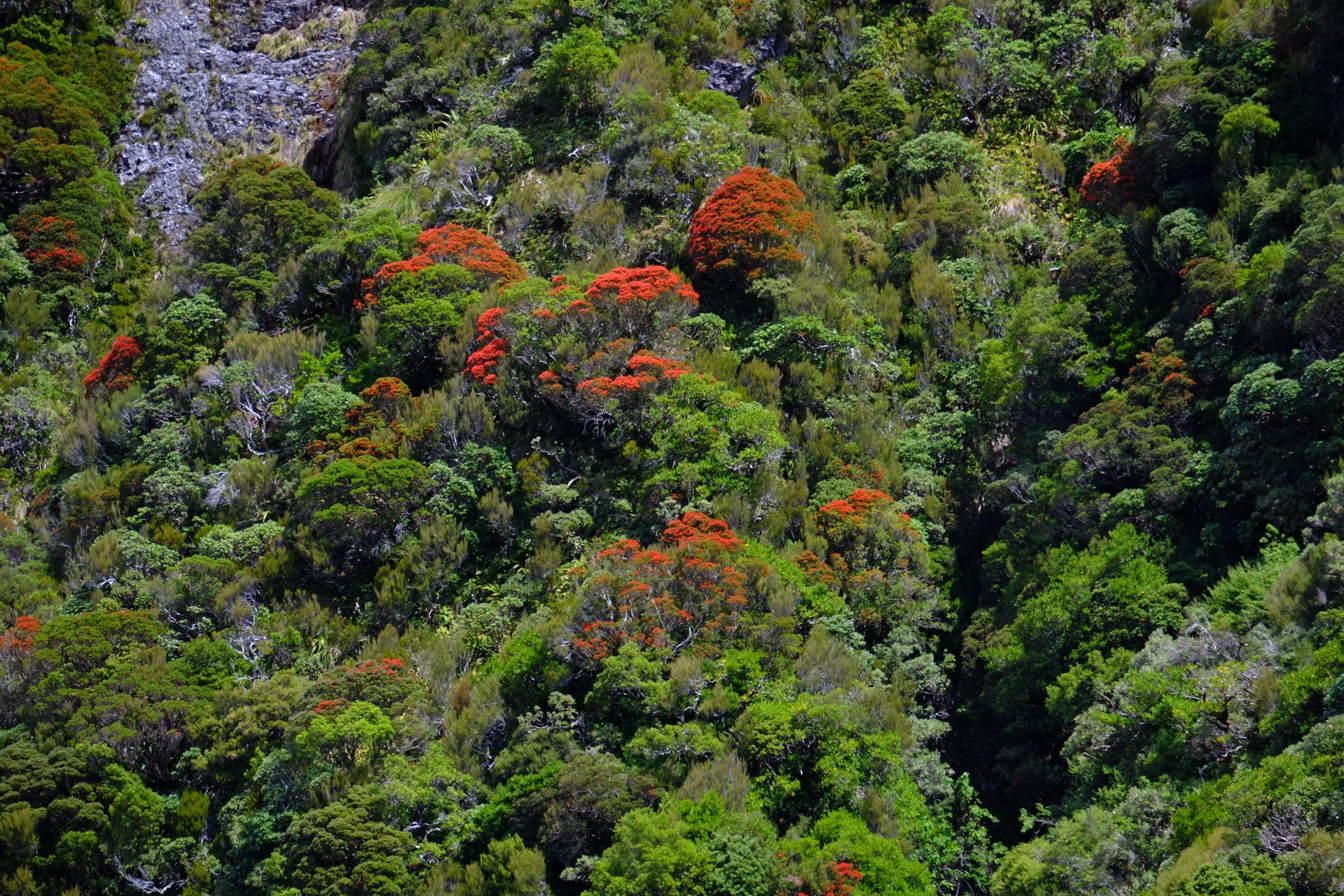
Southern rātā (Metrosideros umbellātā)

Most New Zealand native lizard species, including Canterbury geckos, are omnivorous, eating a range of arthropods and sometimes other lizards and berries, and nectar and pollen from flowers. Canterbury geckos are primarily insectivores (e.g. eating moths and flies) but will also feed on fruit (berries), in particular from the Coprosma spp. New Zealand gecko species are known to drink nectar from many native plants such as cabbage trees, flax, southern rātā and pōhutukawa, and likely play a minor role in the pollination of these species. Divaricating plant species such as mingimingi (Coprosma propinqua) produce small black/blue berries that are a favourite of lizards. In the paper 'The role of lizards as seed dispersers in New Zealand' it was suggested that New Zealand lizards are "effective dispersers, and white-blue fruits and divaricating shrubs are adapted to lizard dispersal". It was found that lizards eat the fruits of around 23 native species, of which five are divaricating, and favour white-blue fruits to red, even though these are less present in the flora. White-blue fruits are often found in open habitats, which can be near the rocky habitat of the Canterbury gecko. It was also discovered that "Seeds in lizard scats have germination percentages≤control seeds in four species tested. Lizards generally disperse seeds <20 m (66 ft), but allow seeds to escape parent plants and reach safe establishment sites." The researchers concluded that lizards may be important seed dispersers even at their low numbers on the mainland, and potentially assist in the dispersal of more seeds than previously thought: "In shrublands lacking frugivorous birds, lizards may be the only remaining dispersers".

Lizard species vary their behaviour according to weather or habitat opportunities: when it is cold, they may remain inactive or employ the "sit and wait" method for food, and in warmer weather, they may roam their habitats in search of food. Hare, Pledger, Thompson, Miller, & Daugherty studied the metabolic rate of nocturnal Diplodactylidae species in New Zealand emerging for either foraging or thermoregulating through most of the day and found that "their Vo2 [rate of oxygen consumption] is usually elevated only during the active (foraging) phase. ̇Thus, many nocturnal lizards are active at suboptimal temperatures and emergent and thermoregulating when their metabolic rate is low." It was noted that as their metabolic rate would increase with the "corresponding increase in temperature from diurnal thermoregulation," that the lower metabolic rate during the day may not be significant to their physiology.

== Predator/prey ==
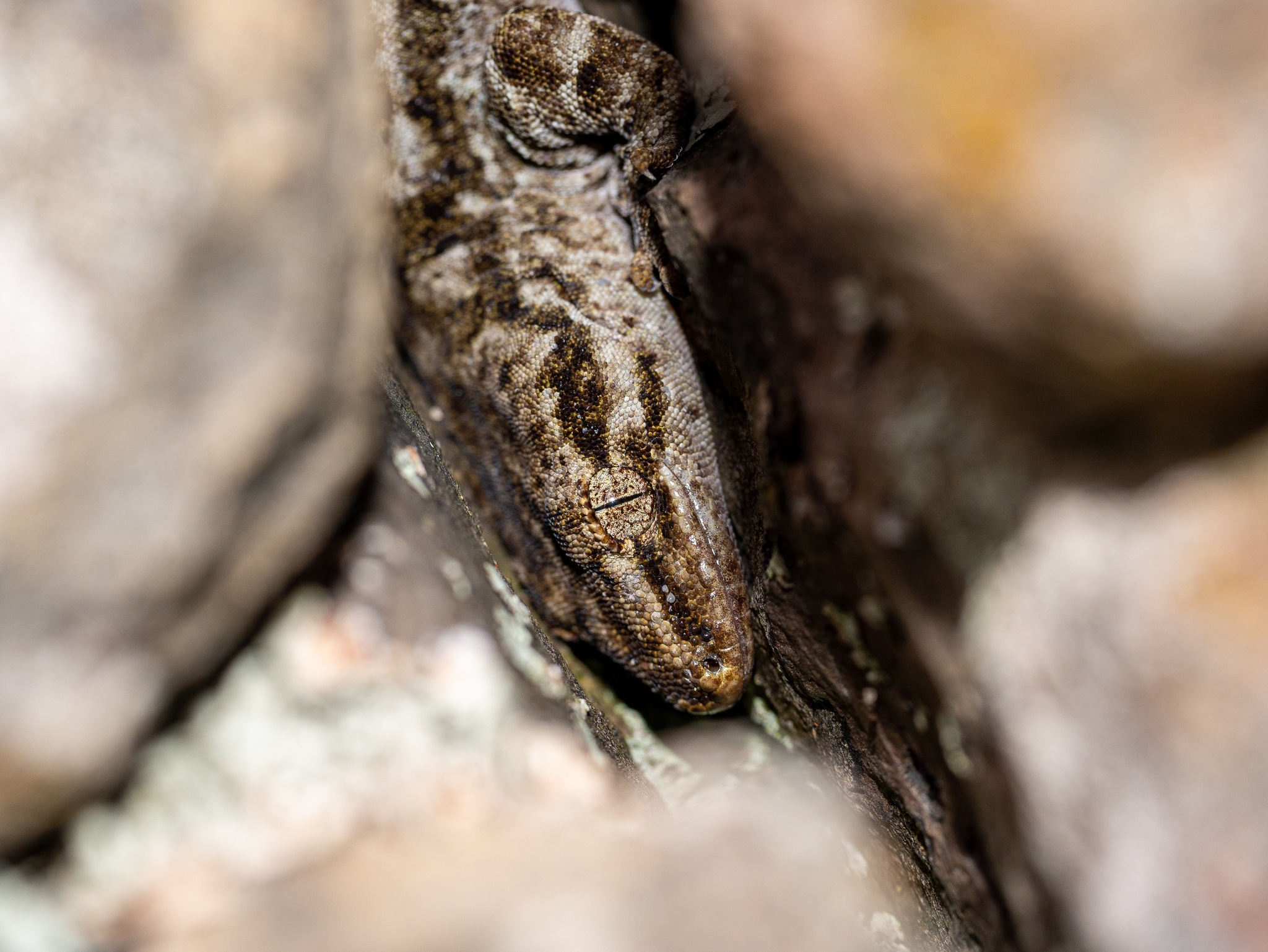
A Canterbury gecko hiding between rocks

Canterbury geckos in the wild have been recorded as having low levels of red mites. All New Zealand geckos have two main threats which are predation and habitat destruction. The main predators of the Canterbury gecko include mammalian pests such as mice, rats, weasels, hedgehogs, cats, stoats, ferrets, pigs and possums. With the evolving suburban areas in Canterbury, the geckos are being pushed out of their natural habitat and with conversion by burning and ploughing, this is threatening geckos that live in rock outcrops.

Introduced mammals represent one of the biggest threats to many of New Zealand's native species, including the Canterbury gecko. Birds and lizards filled the role of land mammals in New Zealand before the arrival of humans, and due to the absence of these predatory mammals, many species are somewhat naïve to the dangers of predators. Native lizards are predated on by cats, mustelids, possums, hedgehogs and rats (both the European rats and the Polynesian kiore). Some lizards on the mainland and smaller islands went extinct after the introduction of kiore, and many more after the arrival of the various European predators. The Department of Conservation has estimated that New Zealand's population of 1.4 million domestic cats kill "at least 18.76 million animals a year, including 1.12 million native birds".

Three species of New Zealand lizards have been declared extinct since human arrival, and a further eight survive only on outer islands where there are fewer predators. Nocturnal species such as the Woodworthia are more at threat than the diurnal gecko species, as mammalian predators often hunt at night. Many lizards occur only in small, separated populations today due to habitat loss and predation. Almost half of New Zealand's reptile species are listed as threatened or endangered, and it has been declared illegal to handle or keep any native lizard without a permit from DOC. Geckos do have some defence against predators, as they can release (autotomise) their tails at will. The tail is used as a distraction; it continues to move and distract the predator while the gecko escapes. As it takes a few years for the tail to regrow, it is not a method that can be used for every encounter. Larger reptiles and amphibians predate on smaller species, as will larger invertebrates such as centipedes and spiders. Birds such as owls, terns, rails and kingfishers will predate on geckos, as will blackbirds and magpies. Introduced predatory invertebrates such as ants, wasps and mantids have been known to predate some New Zealand lizard species.

Mites are common parasites of all lizard species in New Zealand, in the form of tiny red, orange or creamy white spots around the eyes, ears, armpits hind limbs and cloaca. Internal parasites include a range of nematodes and diseases such as Salmonella. Skrjabinodon poicilandri is a native nematode species known to infect only geckos. They are members of the family Oxyuroidea, and as such are "strictly monoxenous (direct, one-host life cycle) with the egg being the infective stage". The geckos are infected when they unintentionally consume the eggs. The study by Mockett et al. confirmed that the New Zealand gecko nematodes all belonged to the same genus, Skrjabinodon. Host phylogeny was found to significantly predict the parasite phylogeny, which indicates that cospeciation may have played a role in the evolution of New Zealand geckos and the associated Skrjabinodon, although it was acknowledged that host-switching to closely related host species would have played an important role. It was also noted that "not all host–parasite associations supported a congruent host–parasite phylogenetic history".

== New Zealand lizard history ==
New Zealand has 99 native lizard taxa (including undescribed entities), all of which belong to genera that are endemic to the country. They are also globally significant in that they have a high level of adaptation to cold-climate living. Most lizard species bear live young, which is unusual as the majority of lizards around the world lay eggs. This adaptation enables the mother lizard to select the best available temperature for the developing young, by either sun basking or moving into a deep retreat. These lizards also exhibit extreme longevity, living to 40 or more years. This lengthy lifespan arises from "an existence in relative slow motion at cool temperatures", and in alpine zones a long period of hibernation. In comparison, many lizard species in other parts of the world live only 5–10 years. Jewell states that "this same effect also works to expand gestation (pregnancy) and growth rates to novel degrees". New Zealand's lizards also inhabit a range of harsh environments, such as alpine areas that are covered in snow for much of the year, and coastal areas pounded by waves. New Zealand lizard species are thought to have been present for at least 40 million years, with older species such as the tuatara and amphibian species present for around 80 million years.

== Other information ==
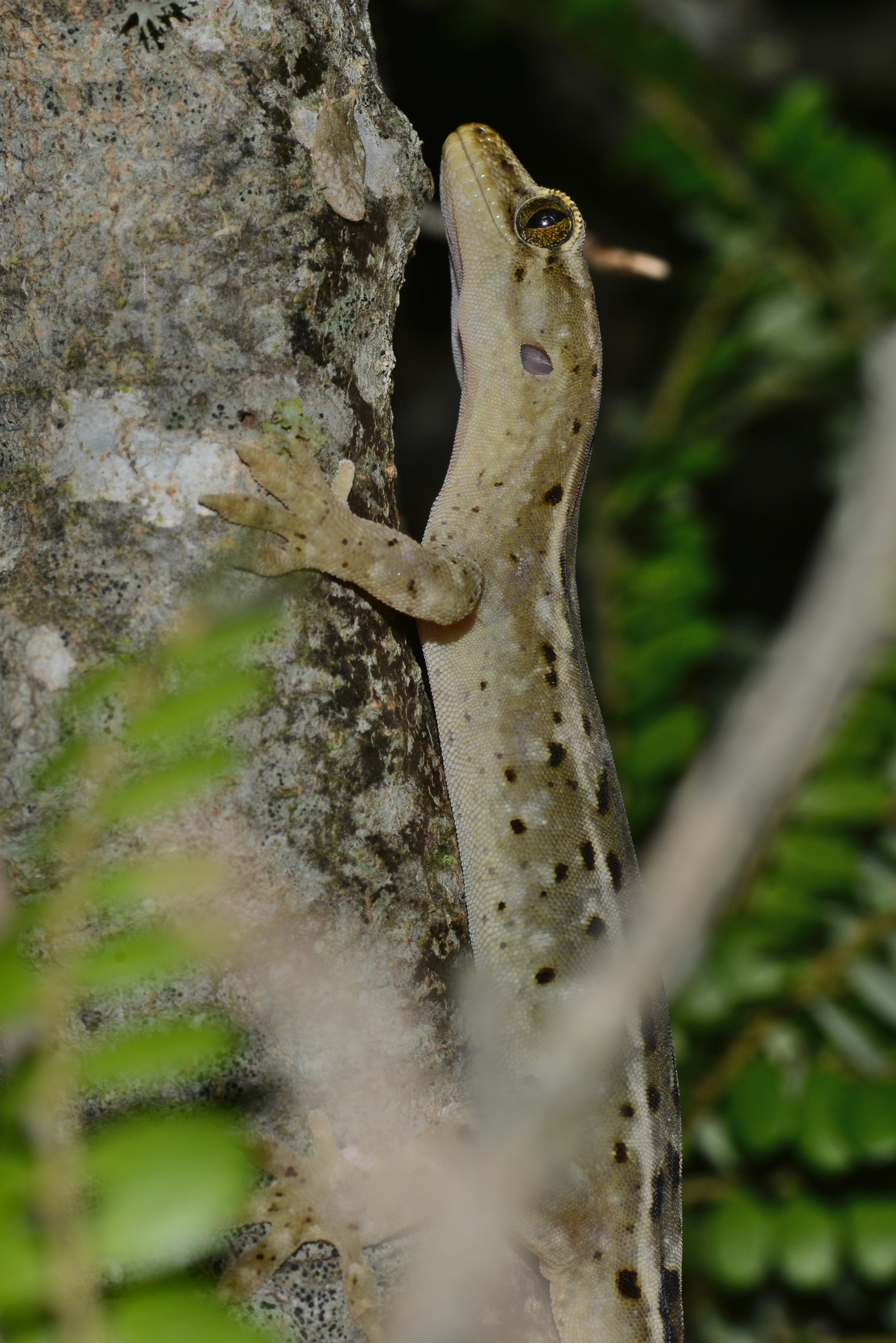
A Canterbury gecko on a tree

Geckos can vocalise, and many New Zealand species make a chirping sound, while some green geckos produce a sound much like a 'bark'. They are found on both the mainland and the offshore islands, at a wide range of altitudes (from sea level to c. 2,200 m (7,220 ft)), and in many different habitats.

Systematic searching and pitfall trapping are the primary methods for monitoring lizards species, but Tony Whitaker (1967) would locate nocturnal species such as the Canterbury gecko by 'eye-shine'- "created when light from a torch beam is reflected from the tapetum lucidum (a layer of tissue in the eye)". The testing of this technique enabled him to develop a binocular-mounted spotlight with a controllable light source, which could locate geckos over distances of 10–100m. This equipment proved invaluable when surveying difficult to search terrain and in areas with low population densities and/or "cryptic" species. Tracking tunnels are a potential monitoring method, as Jarvie & Monks "obtained relatively clear, measurable prints for all gecko species" in their testing, and the findings suggested that footprints from tracking tunnels may be useful in distinguishing between gecko species, although additional research is needed to "assess the ability to further discriminate intra- and inter-genera lizard footprints from tracking tunnels".

In 2015, some Canterbury geckos were relocated into Riccarton Bush from the bluffs above Te Rāpaki-o-Te Rakiwhakaputa, as due to the Christchurch earthquake their habitat was under threat. Two hundred and nine geckos were retrieved "from the Crater Rim Bluffs by abseil access rope technicians because major geotechnical work planned for the area would destroy the geckos' habitat". While it was noted that the forested habitat of the Bush was very different from their previous rocky bluff habitat, it was selected as the release area due to the predator-proof fence surrounding it, offering the geckos the best chance for survival. Canterbury geckos had lived in the Riccarton Bush area until around the 1980s, and as such it was determined they could survive there again. The geckos were fitted with radio transmitters and released into kahikatea trees (Dacrycarpus dacrydioides), although most moved to "other vine-covered trees or stumps. One took up residence in a cabbage tree near the release tree". The transmitters proved effective in monitoring the distance the geckos moved and whether they remained close enough together for further mating opportunities, and the geckos "seem to have settled in well".

Māori brought with them the traditional Polynesian names for reptiles and amphibians, ngārara is the general term for reptiles and moko or mokomoko for lizards, with other names such as moko pāpā referring to 'types' or discrete species of reptiles. Reptiles have particular cultural and spiritual significance to Māori as they are cited in many myths and legends, with "links to death, demons and the after-world". There can be much cultural superstition and fear surrounding ngārara, with green coloured gecko species being seen as a bad omen. Some iwi (tribes) see lizards as kaitiaki (guardians) of the dead, and lizards were often buried or placed near important structures such as wānanga (house of learning). In art such as carvings, petroglyphs, tattoos and pendants, reptiles are often pictured, but curiously, native frogs are not and have no feature in the myths and legends, even though Māori would have encountered them in the landscape.
