= NMW =

NMW may refer to:

- National Minimum Wage Act 1998, UK
- National Moth Week, a citizen science project in the United States
- National Museum Wales
- National Museum, Warsaw
- Naturhistorisches Museum, Vienna (Wien), Austria
- New Music Weekly, a trade magazine in the United States
- Nimoa language of Papua New Guinea (ISO 639-3 code: nmw)
- North Maine Woods, a region of Maine, United States
