= Moth (disambiguation) =

A moth is an insect in the order Lepidoptera.

Moth or MOTH may also refer to:

== Places ==
- Moth, Uttar Pradesh, a town in Jhansi district, Uttar Pradesh, India

== Music ==
- Moth (album), an album by Chairlift
- The Moth (Devin Townsend album), a 2026 album by Devin Townsend
- Moth (band), a rock band from Cincinnati, Ohio
- Moth / Wolf Cub, an EP by Burial and Four Tet
- "The Moth", a song by Aimee Mann from Lost in Space
- "Moth", a song by Audioslave from Revelations
- "The Moth", a song by Death Angel from The Evil Divide
- "Moth", a song by Failure from Magnified
- "Moths", a song by Jethro Tull from Heavy Horses
- "Moths", a 2026 song by Conan Gray from Wishbone Deluxe

== Film and television ==
- The Moth (Lost), the 7th episode of Lost
- The Moth (1911 film), a German silent drama film
- The Moth (1917 film), an American film starring Norma Talmadge
- The Moth (1934 film), an American film starring Sally O'Neil
- The Moth (1980 film), a Polish film
- Parwana (1971 film) or Moth, a 1971 Indian Hindi-language film
- The Moth, a 1997 TV film starring Juliet Aubrey

== Literature ==
- Moths, 1880 novel by Ouida
- The Moth (magazine), an Irish international arts and literature quarterly
- "The Moths" (short story) by Helena Maria Viramontes
- The Moth (novel), a 1948 novel by James M. Cain
- The Moth, a 1986 novel by Catherine Cookson

== Transport ==
- De Havilland Moth, a series of light aircraft, sports planes and military trainers
- Moth (dinghy), three different classes of sailing boats
- Shaanxi KJ-200, an airborne early warning and control program with a NATO reporting name of "Moth"

== People ==
- Charlotte Moth (born 1978), British artist
- Frederik Moth (1694–1746), governor of the Danish West Indies
- Gustav Moths (1877–?), German rower who competed in the 1900 Olympics
- Richard Moth (born 1958), British Roman Catholic prelate

== Fictional characters ==
- Moth is the name of two characters in William Shakespeare plays:
  - A page in Love's Labour's Lost
  - A fairy in A Midsummer Night's Dream
- Moth (character), a fictional superhero

== Organizations ==
- The Moth, a non-profit storytelling group
- Memorable Order of Tin Hats, a war veterans' organization

== Other uses ==
- Moth bean, grown especially in dry parts of South Asia for its tiny edible beans
- Moths, play by Henry Hamilton (playwright) from the Ouida novel
- Moth orchid, a genus of orchid
- HD 61005, a star with a debris disk, also known as the Moth

== See also ==
- Mothing, wildlife observation
- Mothra (disambiguation)
