= Cloudy gecko =

Conservation status
- CITES Appendix III (CITES)

Scientific classification
- Domain: Eukaryota
- Kingdom: Animalia
- Phylum: Chordata
- Class: Reptilia
- Order: Squamata
- Infraorder: Gekkota
- Family: Diplodactylidae
- Genus: Mokopirirakau
- Species: M. nebulosus

Binomial name
- Mokopirirakau nebulosus (McCann, 1955)
- Distribution of the cloudy gecko on a map of the South Island Known native range

Synonyms
- Naultinus granulatus; Naultinus brevidactylus; Naultinus maculatus; Naultinus greyii; Naultinus versicolor; Hoplodactylus granulatus; Hoplodactylus nebulosus; Heteropholis nebulosus

Species of lizard

The cloudy gecko (Mokopirirakau nebulosus) is a species of gecko that is endemic to New Zealand. It is found on Stewart Island and its outlying islands. It is both arboreal and terrestrial, living in lowland forest, scrub and shrubs, and also in rocky areas, typically in cold, wet, exposed places.

Cloudy geckos were considered to be forest geckoes (Mokopirirakau granulatus) until they were described as a separate species in 1955, at which time they were placed in the Heteropholis genus. Their appearance is very similar in pattern and colour to the forest gecko, however, there is usually more green and brown rather than grey, and the pattern is less distinct. The inside of the mouth is yellow to bright orange.
