= Shirley Pledger =

New Zealand mathematician and statistician

Shirley Pledger is a New Zealand mathematician and statistician known for her work on mark and recapture methods for estimating wildlife populations. She is an emeritus professor in the School of Mathematics and Statistics of Victoria University of Wellington.

== Education and career ==
Pledger became a student at Victoria University of Wellington in 1961, and chose mathematics over physics because of its more welcoming environment to women at that time. She specialised in algebraic topology and earned a master's degree. Originally intending to go into secondary-school education, she was instead persuaded by the department head, professor J. T. Campbell, to become a lecturer in mathematics at Victoria University of Wellington in 1965. She married another new lecturer in mathematics, Ken Pledger, in 1967, and gave up her lecturership in 1970 soon before the birth of their first child.

A few years later she returned to academia as an instructor in statistics at Wellington Polytechnic and in 1980 she obtained a lecturer position in statistics at Victoria University of Wellington. While working there, she completed a Ph.D. in statistics in 1999, concerning mark and recapture methods. She was given a chair as a professor of biometrics at the university in 2011.

== Recognition ==
Pledger is the 2014 winner of the Campbell Award of the New Zealand Statistical Association.
