= Schist gecko =

Scientific classification
- Kingdom: Animalia
- Phylum: Chordata
- Class: Reptilia
- Order: Squamata
- Suborder: Gekkota
- Family: Diplodactylidae
- Genus: Woodworthia

Binomial name
- Woodworthia sp.

Species of gecko

The schist gecko (Woodworthia "Central Otago") is a species of reptile found in the South Island of New Zealand.

== Description ==
Schist geckos are a small to medium-sized species. The SVL of schist geckos ranges between 51–71 millimetres (2.0–2.8 in), but it is usually around 60–68 millimetres (2.4–2.7 in). The intact tail length of schist geckos measures about equal to the SVL (71 mm). The rostral scale commences at the tip of the upper jaw, and it is a broad scale that extends from the mouth to or almost to the nostril. The rostral scale of schist geckos is virtually in contact with the nostrils. Schist geckos' eye colour can be brown, green-grey and even yellow.

Schist geckos are slender and dorso-ventrally flattened, which accommodates their nature of inhabiting deep crevices and slabs of schist rock. Its upper (dorsal) body colour is mid-dark brown or olive-brown and mimics the brown colour of schist rocks. Body colour commonly varies among different schist gecko populations. Olive-green, yellowish, and light to dark grey colours have been recorded, as well as the presence of stripes. Some individuals in schist gecko populations have a pale stripe from the eye to the ear opening. In addition to colour, it is common for patterns to vary between individuals. This is due to the irregular pale brown blotches and random pale/darker small spots and flecks. Markings extend down the intact tail. Other markings can include a bold marking on the head of geckos or a brown V-shaped marking behind the eyes. Schist geckos have a pink mouth lining and tongue. There is a grey tip noticeable on the tongue.

The distal phalanges of schist geckos are long and straight. The distal phalange is a portion of the toe that does not form the lamellar pad. Situated beneath the toe of schist geckos are curved lamellae. These are a series of soft, scale-like plates that divide and cover the width of the slightly expanded toe-pads. Schist geckos have nine to eleven subdigital lamellae. The soles of schist geckos' feet are grey in a paler buff form, and the toes of schist geckos are narrow in comparison to other Woodworthia.

Schist geckos are distinguishable from other neighbouring gecko species, such as the southern alps gecko. This is because the under (ventral) surface colour of schist geckos is darker in appearance, which is mid-grey containing dark grey specks.

== Geographic distribution ==
Schist geckos are endemic to the South Island of New Zealand. Schist geckos are confined to a small part of the low-lying hill country in Otago including between the Ida Burn and Rough Ridge ranges. The specific area in which schist geckos are found is between the Maniototo, Manuherikia and Clutha Valleys. The Manuherikia River and the upper Taieri River are catchments that roughly contain the specific area of schist geckos. Schist geckos are especially common in Alexandra. However, this is susceptible to change due to the decline in species numbers.

Schist geckos rarely share their range with any other Woodworthia, with only narrow overlaps with other species.

== Habitat ==
Schist geckos are a terrestrial species with a montane/subalpine habitat preference. Schist geckos prefer dry and rocky habitats, particularly schist rock outcrops. These outcrops and tors have an elevation of up to 1100 m above sea level. Schist geckos can also be found in some residential areas where suitable rock outcrops are present.

== Ecology ==
=== Life cycle and phenology ===
Schist geckos are known to sunbathe within or near crevices during the day and emerge at night to avoid predators. Individuals will venture out at night onto the open rock surfaces as well as within the dense vegetation growing in the low-lying lands. The dense vegetation includes Muehlenbeckia complexa, bush-lawyer, Melicytus alpinus or Coprosma sp.

It takes juveniles four years to reach reproductive maturity. Annual mating occurs after February and happens straight after egg laying. Two young are born in February, the year after reproduction. Finding a mate is not challenging for schist geckos because they are able to form large aggregations when abundant.

=== Diet and foraging ===
Schist geckos are nocturnal foragers. Schist geckos are insectivores, but they also consume fruits. When available, schist geckos consume flower nectar.

=== Predators, parasites, and diseases ===
Predators vary over different parts of their range. Schist geckos are predated on by introduced mammalian predators such as rodents, stoats, ferrets, weasels, and hedgehogs.

== Conservation status ==
The conservation status of schist geckos was updated from Not Threatened to Declining in 2015. The regional trend projects a 10-30% decline for schist gecko numbers.

== Threats ==
Schist geckos may not be able to adapt to new environmental conditions, such a climate change, due to their restricted geographic range. A select number of individual schist geckos have been found near residential areas and this number may increase as their habitat is modified via intense agricultural development.
