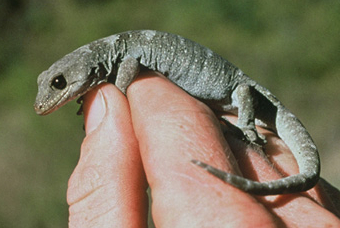

Conservation status
- Vulnerable (IUCN 3.1)
- CITES Appendix III

Scientific classification
- Kingdom: Animalia
- Phylum: Chordata
- Class: Reptilia
- Order: Squamata
- Suborder: Gekkota
- Family: Diplodactylidae
- Genus: Mokopirirakau
- Species: M. kahutarae

Binomial name
- Mokopirirakau kahutarae (Whitaker, 1985)
- Known native range on a map of the South Island

Synonyms
- Hoplodactylus kahutarae Whitaker, 1985; Mokopirirakau kahutarae — Nielsen et al., 2011

= Black-eyed gecko =

Species of lizard

The black-eyed gecko (Mokopirirakau kahutarae), also known as Whitaker's sticky-toed gecko, is a species of lizard in the family Diplodactylidae. An alpine gecko species, discovered in 1970, it inhabits high-altitude mountains in three areas of the South Island of New Zealand. It is the highest-altitude lizard species in New Zealand, living up to 2,200 m (7,200 ft) above sea level.

== Taxonomy ==
The species was described by New Zealand herpetologist Tony Whitaker in a paper published nominally in 1984, but actually in 1985. Initially classified in the genus Hoplodactylus, it is now placed in the genus Mokopirirakau along with other narrow-toed alpine and forest geckos. The holotype specimen is in the collection of the Museum of New Zealand Te Papa Tongarewa.

== Description ==
The black-eyed gecko is a medium-sized lizard, olive or grey above and white below, with 6–7 lighter bands across the dorsal surface of its body, and speckled sides. It has very small body scales and narrow tapering toes, which more closely resemble those of an arboreal than a terrestrial gecko. It is most notable for its prominent eyebrows and unusually jet-black irises – all other related geckos have a light iris with a filigree pattern. When handled it makes chirruping calls or squeals.

== Behaviour ==
M. kahutarae is nocturnal and can be active at temperatures as low as 7 °C. It sun-basks on boulders at the entrance to its retreat, but is very wary and flees rapidly if disturbed.

== Geographic range ==
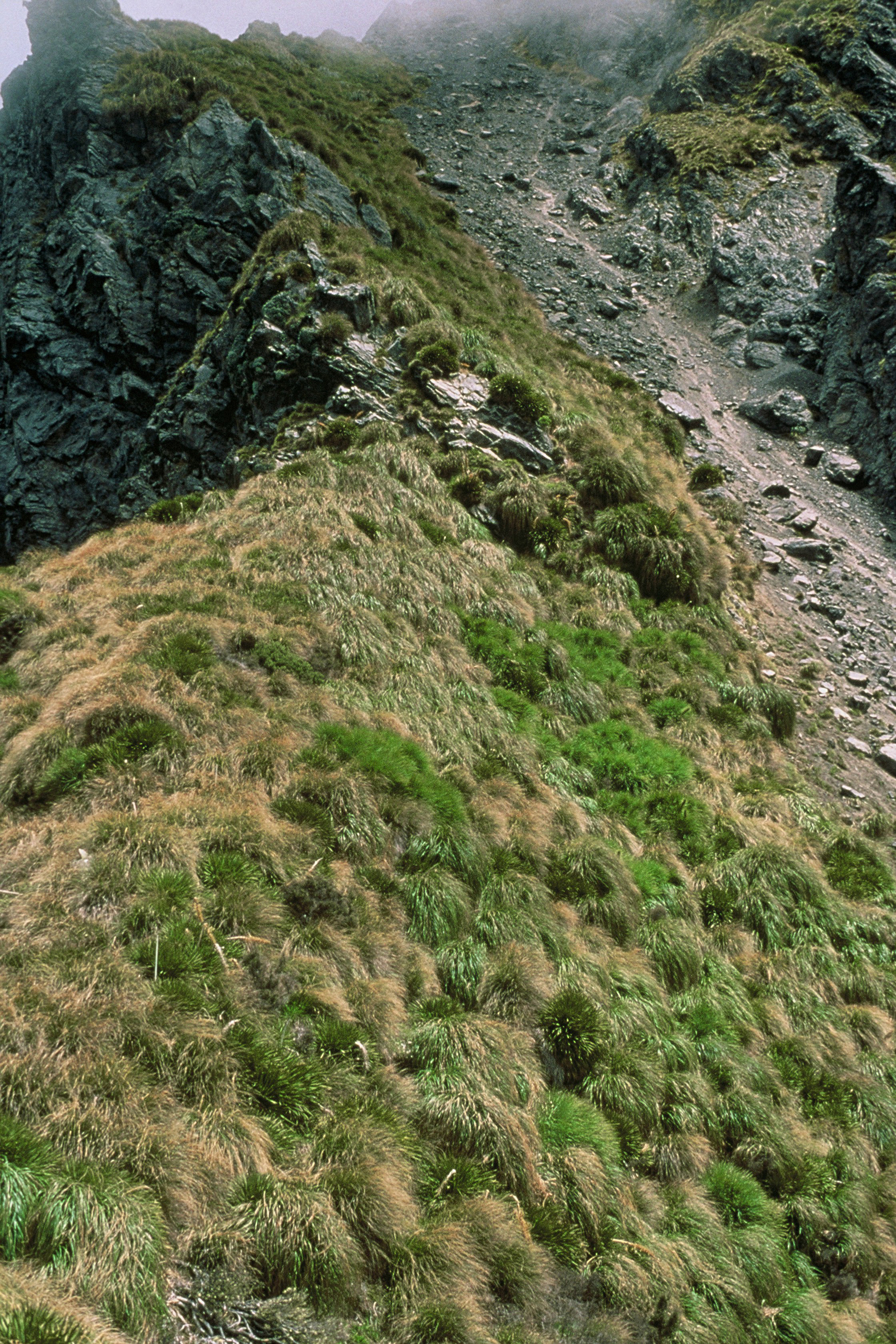
The Hutton's shearwater breeding colony at Shearwater Stream where the black-eyed gecko was first discovered

The first specimen of M. kahutarae collected was found in March 1970 in a colony of Hutton's shearwaters on Mt Tarahaka in the Seaward Kaikōura Range. It was immediately recognised as an undescribed species, but repeated searches from 1970 to 1981 in the Seaward Kaikōuras failed to find any further individuals, until in 1983 four were collected in the Kahutara Saddle area, 30 km (19 mi) away from where it was first found. The specific epithet, kahutarae, is taken from the place where the type specimen was found.

The black-eyed gecko has since been found in the mountains of Nelson and in the Lewis Pass area, living on alpine bluffs and rocky outcrops between 1,200 and 2,200 m (3,900 and 7,200 ft). It is able to survive in the sub-nival zone, where vegetation is patchy and snow-covered in winter.

It is possible that this species is not especially adapted to an alpine habit; rocks and bluffs may be its last retreat from the rats and mice common at lower altitudes.

== Conservation status ==
In 2012 the Department of Conservation (DOC) classified M. kahutarae as Nationally Vulnerable under the New Zealand Threat Classification System. This was based on it existing in just a few subpopulations, the largest of less than 500 individuals, predicted to decline. It was noted as being data-poor, and sparsely distributed with a restricted range.

== See also ==
- Geckos of New Zealand
