= Mothing =

Type of wildlife observation

Mothing or moth-watching is a form of wildlife observation where moths are observed, both for recreation and for citizen science activities. It is analogous to birdwatching, but for moths.

Many bird observatories also run moth traps.

== Techniques ==
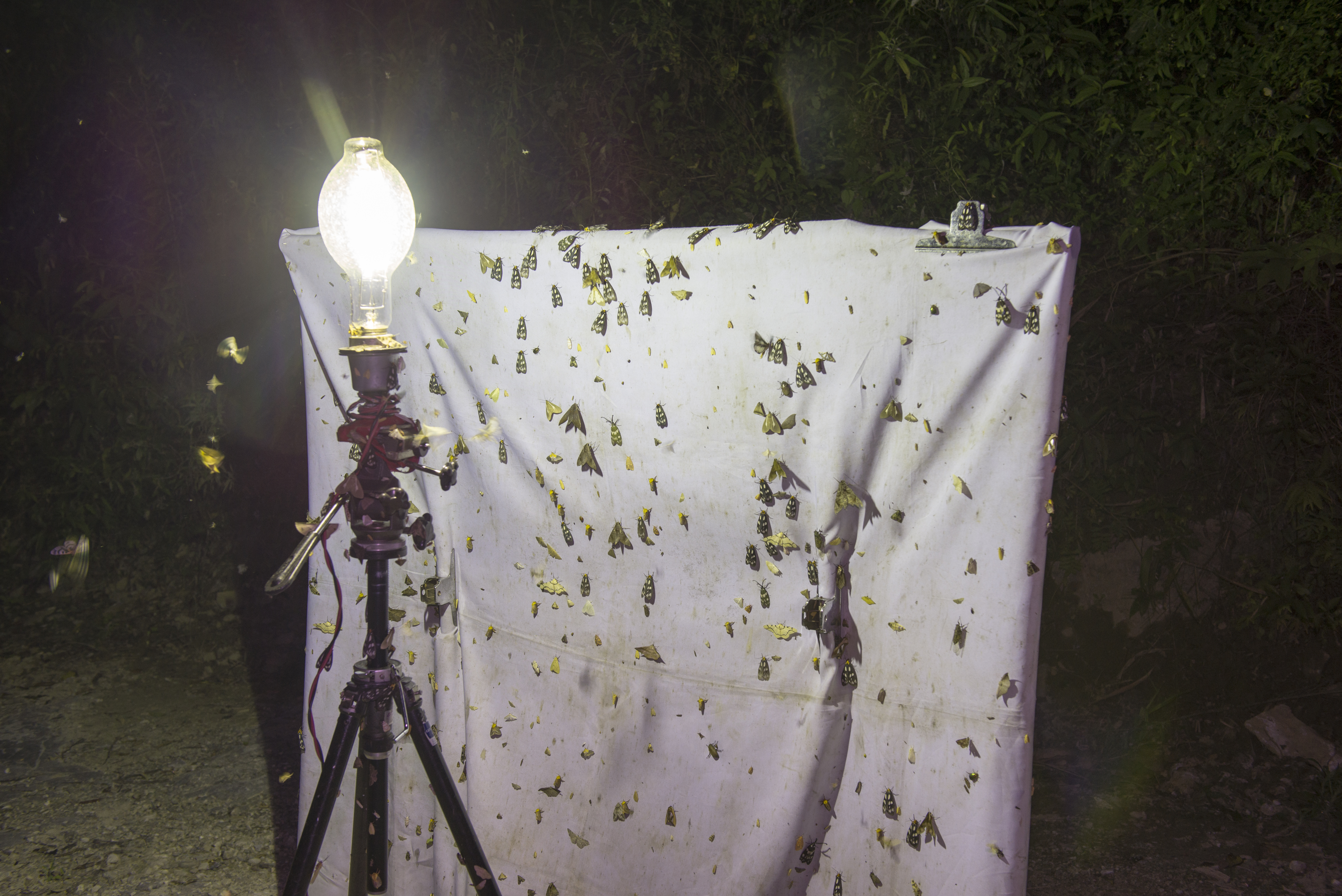
A light set up near a white sheet to attract moths and other nocturnal insects.

Mothing is frequently done with the aid of attractants, such as sugary solutions painted in tree trunks or using light. There are also moth traps, which are designed specifically for mothing, with do-it-yourself and commercial versions.

== See also ==
- Butterfly watching
- National Moth Week
