= Sabine Valley =

Valley in Tasman District, New Zealand

Coordinates: 42°00′S 172°42′E

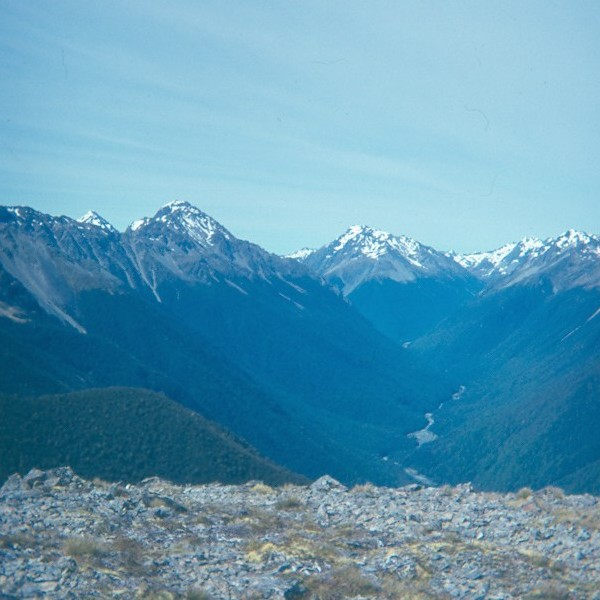
The Sabine Valley in winter 2008

The Sabine Valley is a landform in northern South Island, New Zealand. Much of the Sabine Valley is forested with beech canopy. Example understory vegetation is the presence of Archeria traversii within certain mountain beech forests in the upper Sabine Valley of the South Island, New Zealand.
