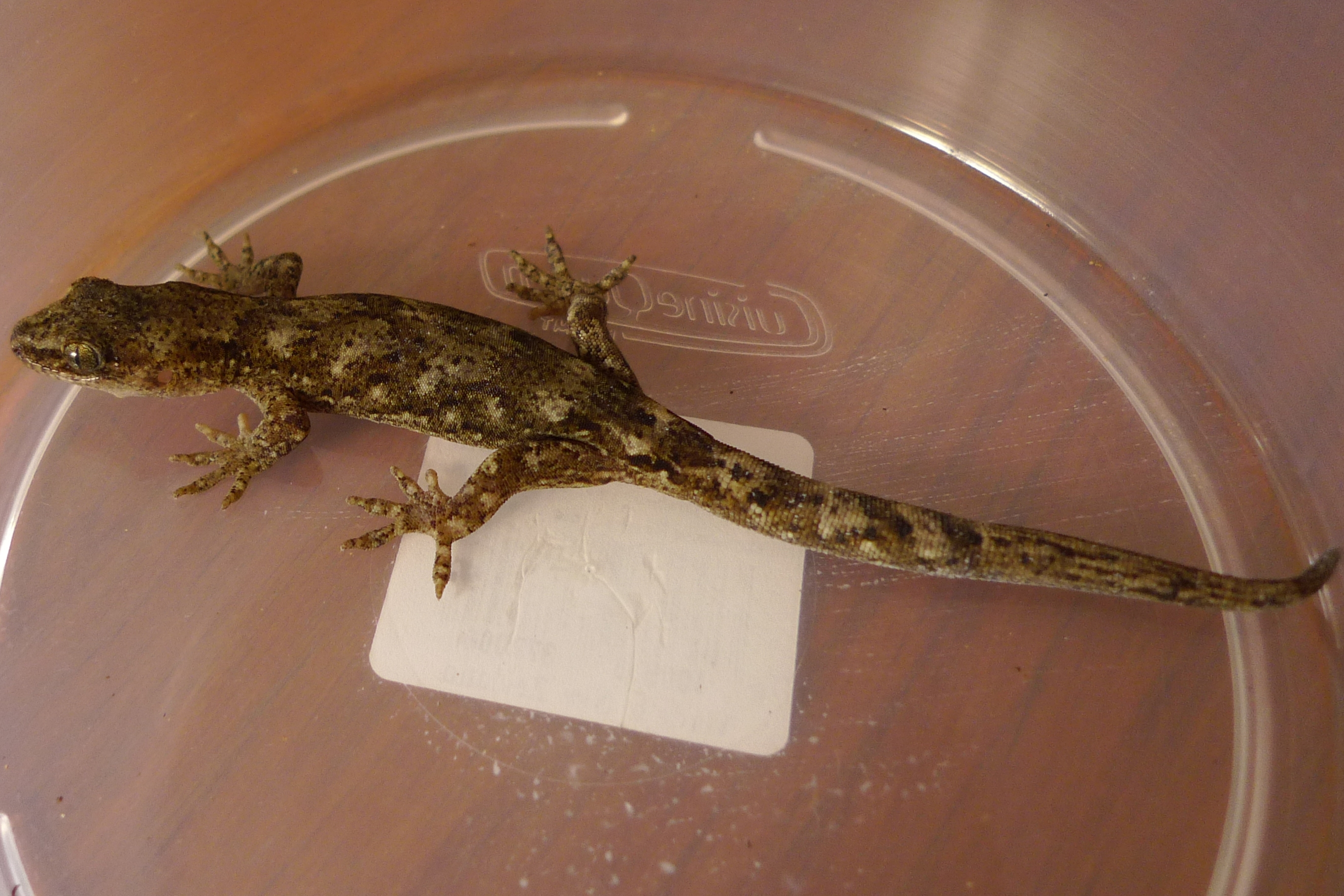
- W. maculata

Scientific classification
- Kingdom: Animalia
- Phylum: Chordata
- Class: Reptilia
- Order: Squamata
- Suborder: Gekkota
- Family: Diplodactylidae
- Genus: Woodworthia; Garman, 1901

= Woodworthia =

Genus of lizards

Woodworthia is a genus of geckos in the family Diplodactylidae endemic to New Zealand. It includes four formally described species, though as many as 17 genetically distinct species may exist. All species are native to New Zealand.

- Woodworthia brunnea (Cope, 1869) – Canterbury gecko
- Woodworthia chrysosiretica (Robb, 1980) – gold-striped gecko, gold-stripe gecko, or golden sticky-toed gecko
- Woodworthia korowai Winkel et al., 2023 – korowai gecko
- Woodworthia maculata (Gray, 1845) – New Zealand common gecko or Raukawa gecko

Other possible species have been described under informal names:

- Woodworthia "Central Otago" – schist gecko, Central Otago gecko
- Woodworthia "Cromwell" – Kawarau gecko, Cromwell gecko
- Woodworthia "Marlborough mini" – Minimac gecko, Marlborough mini gecko, Kaikouras gecko
- Woodworthia "Mount Arthur" – Kahurangi gecko, Mount Arthur gecko
- Woodworthia "Otago large" – Korero gecko, large Otago gecko, Otago large gecko, Otago-Southland gecko, Danseys Pass gecko
- Woodworthia "pygmy" – pygmy gecko
- Woodworthia "Southern Alps" – Southern Alps gecko
- Woodworthia "southern mini" – short-toed gecko, southern mini gecko
