= Mothra (disambiguation) =

Mothra is a giant monster, or kaiju.

Mothra and Mosura may also refer to:

== Film ==
- Mothra (film)
- Mothra vs. Godzilla
- Godzilla vs. Mothra
- Rebirth of Mothra (released in Japan as Mothra)
- Rebirth of Mothra II (released in Japan as Mothra 2: The Battle Under the Deep Sea)
- Rebirth of Mothra III (released in Japan as Mothra 3: Invasion of King Ghidorah)
- Godzilla, Mothra and King Ghidorah: Giant Monsters All-Out Attack

== Other uses ==
- Mothra (web browser)
- Mothra (song)
- Mothra (star)
- Mosura fentoni, an extinct arthropod named after the character
- The Luminous Fairies and Mothra
