= National Moth Week =

Citizen science project

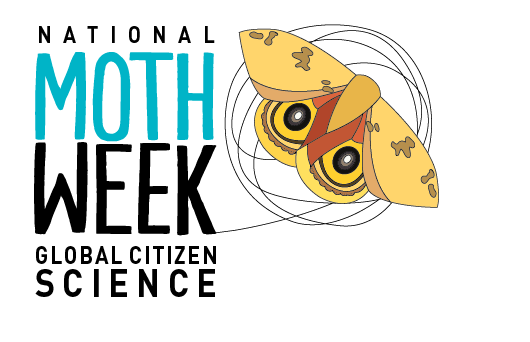
- Logo of National Moths Week since 2014
- Status: Active
- Genre: Citizen science
- Dates: Last week in July
- Frequency: Annually
- Location: Worldwide
- Inaugurated: 2012
- Participants: All interested
- Website: nationalmothweek.org

National Moth Week (NMW) is a citizen science project to study and record populations of moths. The annual event is held in the last week of July. It encourages scientists and non-scientists to participate in mostly night-time surveys of moths. People may participate via organized events, or individually from their own gardens. National Moth Week has partnerships with major online biological data depositories, and participants map moth distribution to provide information on life history aspects of moths around the globe.

National Moth Week was founded in the United States in 2012 by the Friends of the East Brunswick Environmental Commission, a non-profit organization in New Jersey. Since its founding, National Moth Week participation has grown to include events in all 50 U.S. states and more than 80 countries worldwide. In 2023, there were thousands of registrants across all 50 states and 117 countries.

== See also ==
- Mothing
