= Alison Cree =

New Zealand herpetologist and academic

Alison Cree CNZM
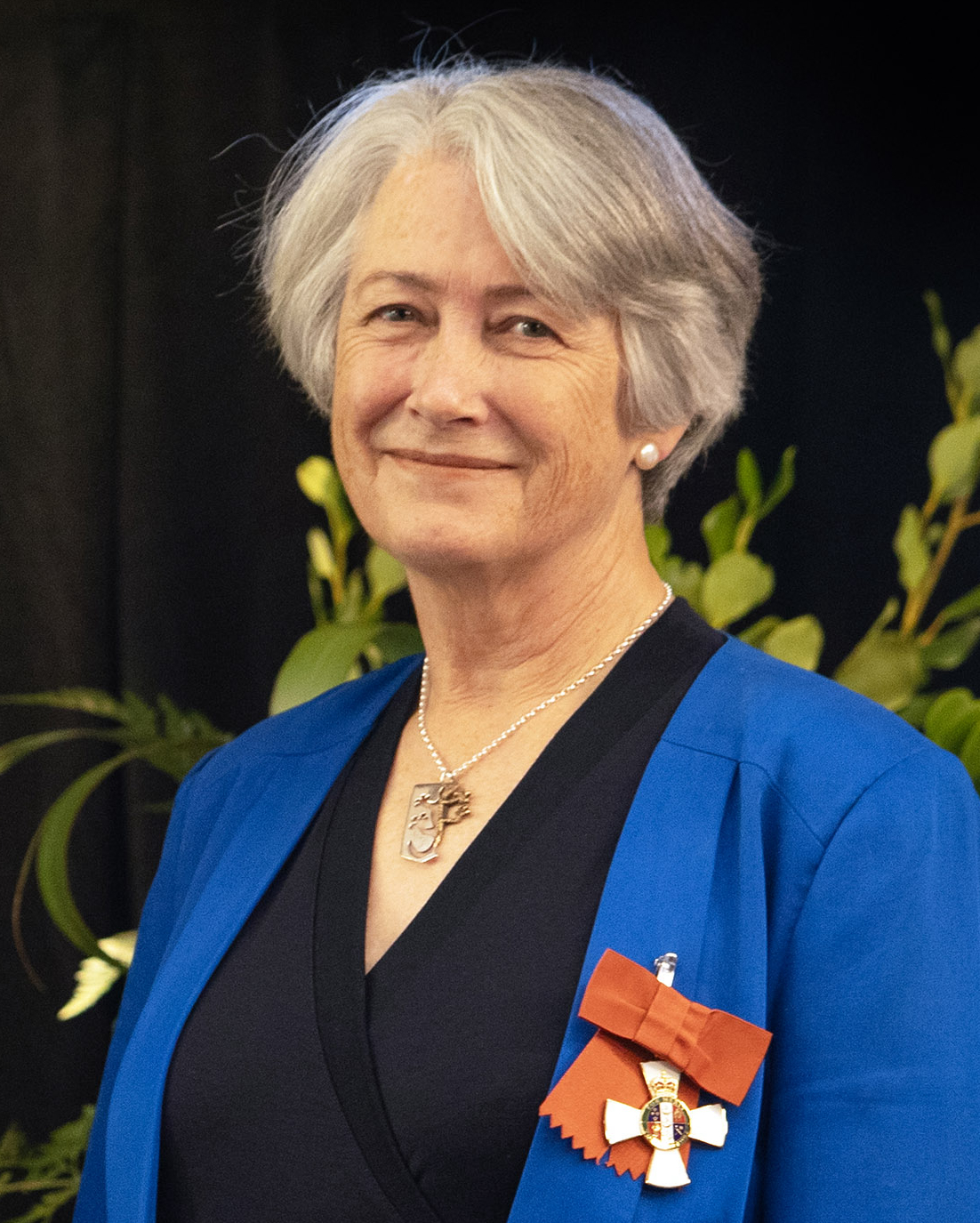
- Cree in 2024
- Education: University of Waikato
- Scientific career
- Fields: Herpetology
- Workplaces: University of Otago
- Thesis: Water relations of the endemic New Zealand frogs Leiopelma archeyi, L. Hamiltoni and L. Hochstetteri (1986)

Alison Marion Cree CNZM is a New Zealand herpetologist. She is currently a professor at the University of Otago.

== Academic career ==
Cree graduated from the University of Waikato in 1986 with a D.Phil. for her thesis titled "Water relations of the endemic New Zealand frogs Leiopelma archeyi, L. Hamiltoni and L. Hochstetteri". Prior to this she had attained a diploma on environmental pollution in Christchurch, through the University of Canterbury.

Cree's work has been on a number of species, but her work with tuatara has attracted the most media attention.

In the 2023 King's Birthday and Coronation Honours, Cree was appointed a Companion of the New Zealand Order of Merit, for services to herpetology, particularly tuatara.

== Selected publications ==
=== Book ===
- Cree, Alison (2014). Tuatara: Biology and conservation of a venerable survivor. Christchurch, New Zealand: Canterbury University Press. ISBN 978-1-927145-44-9. OCLC 888553607.

=== Journal articles ===
- Scott Jarvie; Tim Jowett; Michael B. Thompson; Philip J Seddon; Alison Cree (1 July 2018). "Effects of Warm Temperatures on Metabolic Rate and Evaporative Water Loss in Tuatara, a Cool-Climate Rhynchocephalian Survivor". Ecological and Evolutionary Physiology. 91 (4): 950–966. doi:10.1086/698495. ISSN 1522-2152. PMID 29863954. Wikidata Q57178857.
- Ricardo de Sá Rocha Mello; Scott Jarvie; Lindsay Hazley; Alison Cree (2019). "Comparison among three body parts and three software packages to optimise photographic identification of a reptile (tuatara, Sphenodon punctatus)". Amphibia-Reptilia. 40 (2): 233–244. doi:10.1163/15685381-20181059. ISSN 0173-5373. Wikidata Q101402446.
- Josef Virens; Alison Cree (6 September 2019). "Pregnancy reduces critical thermal maximum, but not voluntary thermal maximum, in a viviparous skink". Journal of Comparative Physiology B. 189 (5): 611–621. doi:10.1007/s00360-019-01230-y. ISSN 0174-1578. PMID 31493184. Wikidata Q93164259.
