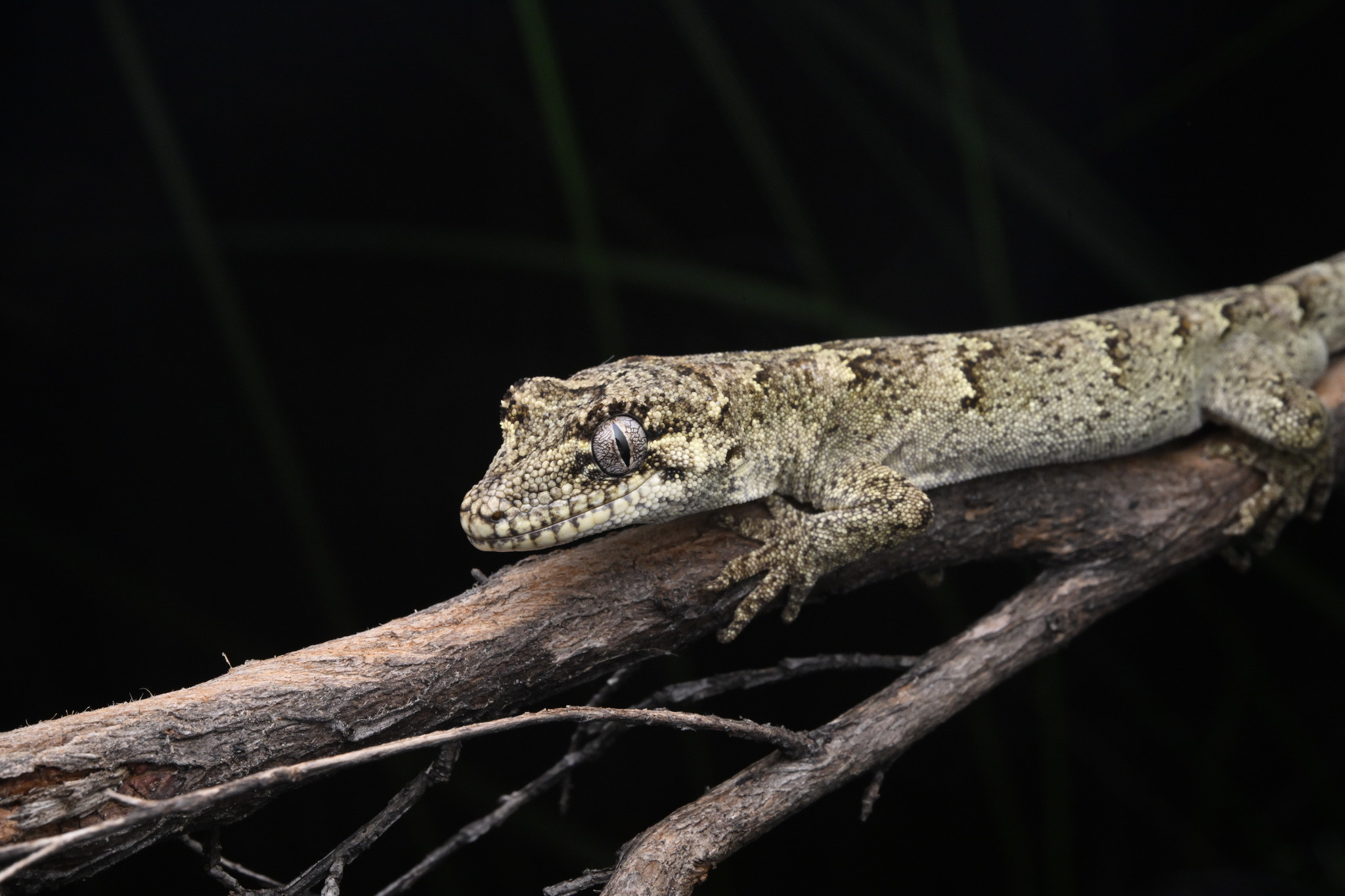

Conservation status
- Gradual Decline (NZ TCS)
- CITES Appendix III

Scientific classification
- Kingdom: Animalia
- Phylum: Chordata
- Class: Reptilia
- Order: Squamata
- Suborder: Gekkota
- Family: Diplodactylidae
- Genus: Mokopirirakau
- Species: M. granulatus

Binomial name
- Mokopirirakau granulatus (Gray, 1845)
- Known native range in New Zealand

Synonyms
- Naultinus granulatus; Naultinus pacificus; Naultinus brevidactylus; Naultinus sylvestris; Naultinus versicolor; Naultinus silvestris; Hoplodactylus granulatus; Dactylocnemis granulatus

= Forest gecko =

Species of lizard

The forest gecko (Mokopirirakau granulatus) is a species of gecko that is endemic to New Zealand. Its Māori name is moko pirirākau ("lizard that clings to trees"). It is found in much of the north and central North Island, and the north and upper west of the South Island. It is a protected species under the Wildlife Act 1953.

== Taxonomy ==
The species was first described by John Edward Gray in 1845, based on a holotype found in the British Museum. He named it Naultinus granulatus, or the granular naultinus. Granulatus refers to the granular texture of the skin. By the 1880s the forest gecko had been recombined as a member of the genus Hoplodactylus.

In 2011 the genus Mokopirirakau was established due to a phylogenetic analysis of New Zealand lizard genera. The forest gecko was placed within this genus, and became the type species.

The rare Cupola gecko of the Nelson Lakes National Park was suspected to be a separate species, until DNA testing in 2021 showed it to be the forest gecko.

== Description ==
Their backs are brown-grey with bright w-shaped splotches, resembling tree bark. Geckos in the southern end of their range often have brighter shades of red and orange. They can rapidly change colour according to their environment. They have grey bellies and white scales at the edge of the mouth. The mouth is yellow or orange, which can be used to differentiate them from the Pacific gecko (Dactylocnemis pacificus). The pads of their feet are yellow, with northern ones having slightly shorter toes than southern ones. They are usually about 70–85 mm long from snout to vent, with some as long as 98 mm.

== Distribution and habitat ==
The forest gecko is present in both North and South Islands. They occur through the North Island from just south of the Bay of Islands down to Taranaki and along the Bay of Plenty. On the South Island they occur through Marlborough, Nelson and Tasman, and down the West Coast as far as Ōkārito Lagoon.

They live primarily in forests and scrublands, from the coast up to the tree line. They also live, though very rarely, in creviced rock above the tree line, as high as 1500 m above sea level. They generally live on tree trunks and larger branches. In the north, they are also often found on slender branches of mānuka and kānuka trees.

== Behaviour ==
Forest geckos are generally nocturnal, but tend to sun bask during the day. When threatened, they will open their mouth and let out a high pitched sound. They are vivaparous, and usually mate in autumn, giving birth in late summer. Forest geckos are omnivorous. They eat insects mainly, and also other invertebrates, nectar, small fruits and the honeydew of scale insects.

== Conservation ==
In 2012 the Department of Conservation reclassified the forest gecko as At Risk under the New Zealand Threat Classification System. It was judged as meeting the criteria for At Risk threat status due to having a low to high ongoing or predicted decline. It is also regarded as being Data Poor, which indicates the Department of Conservation's uncertainty about the listing due to lack of data.

In June 2010 seven forest geckos, four female and three male, were stolen from a wildlife park in Northland.

== Gallery ==
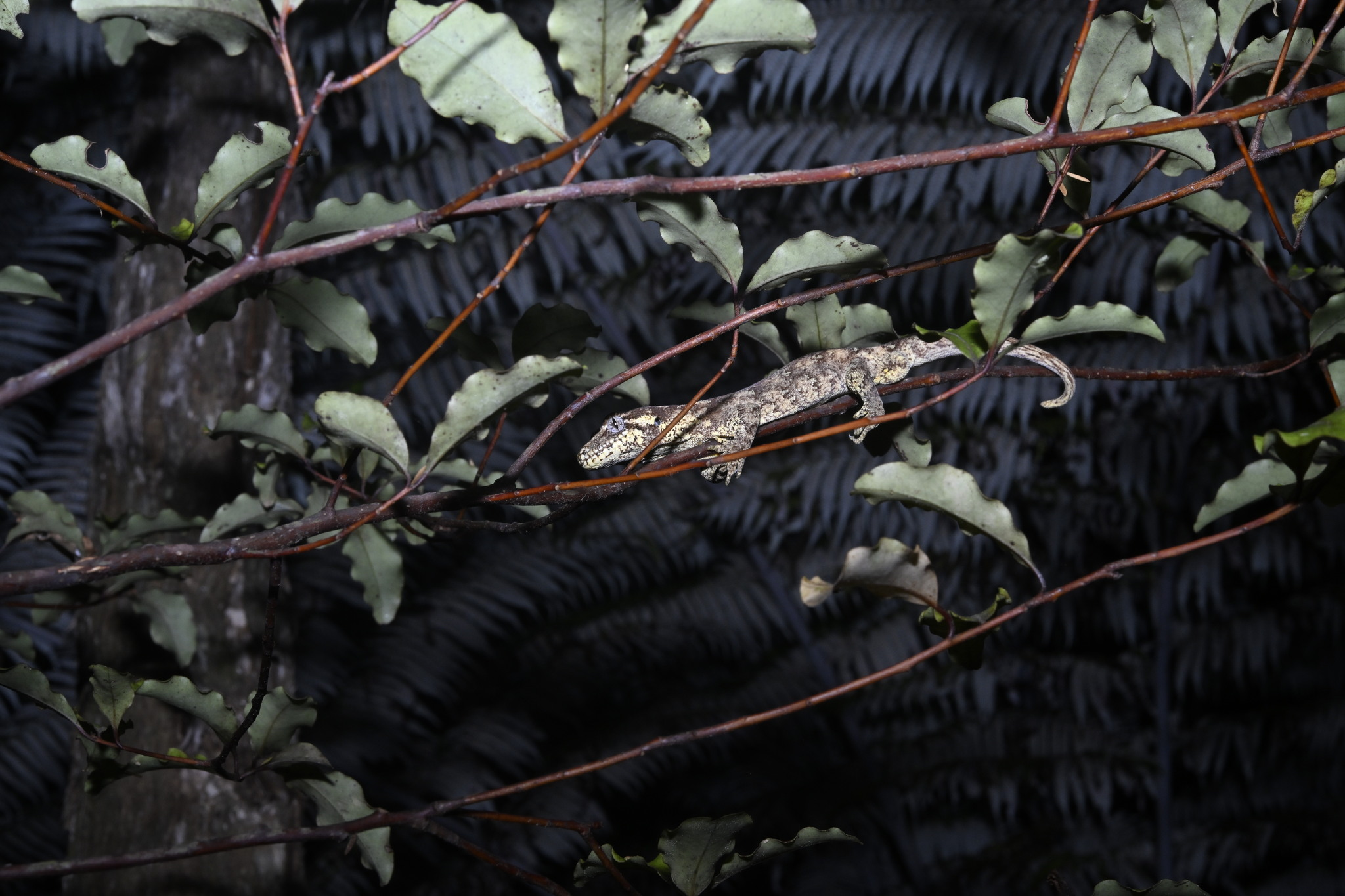

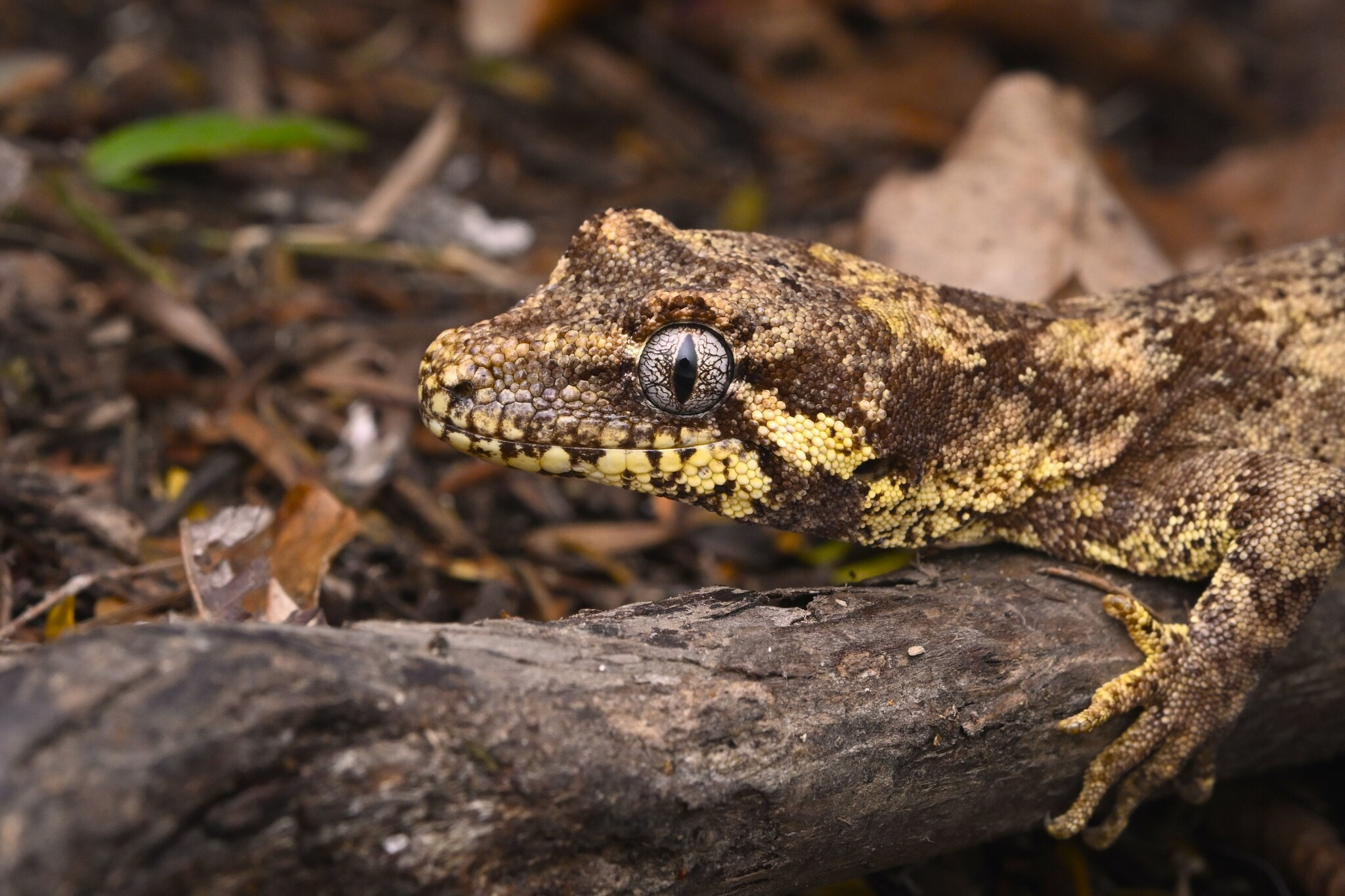

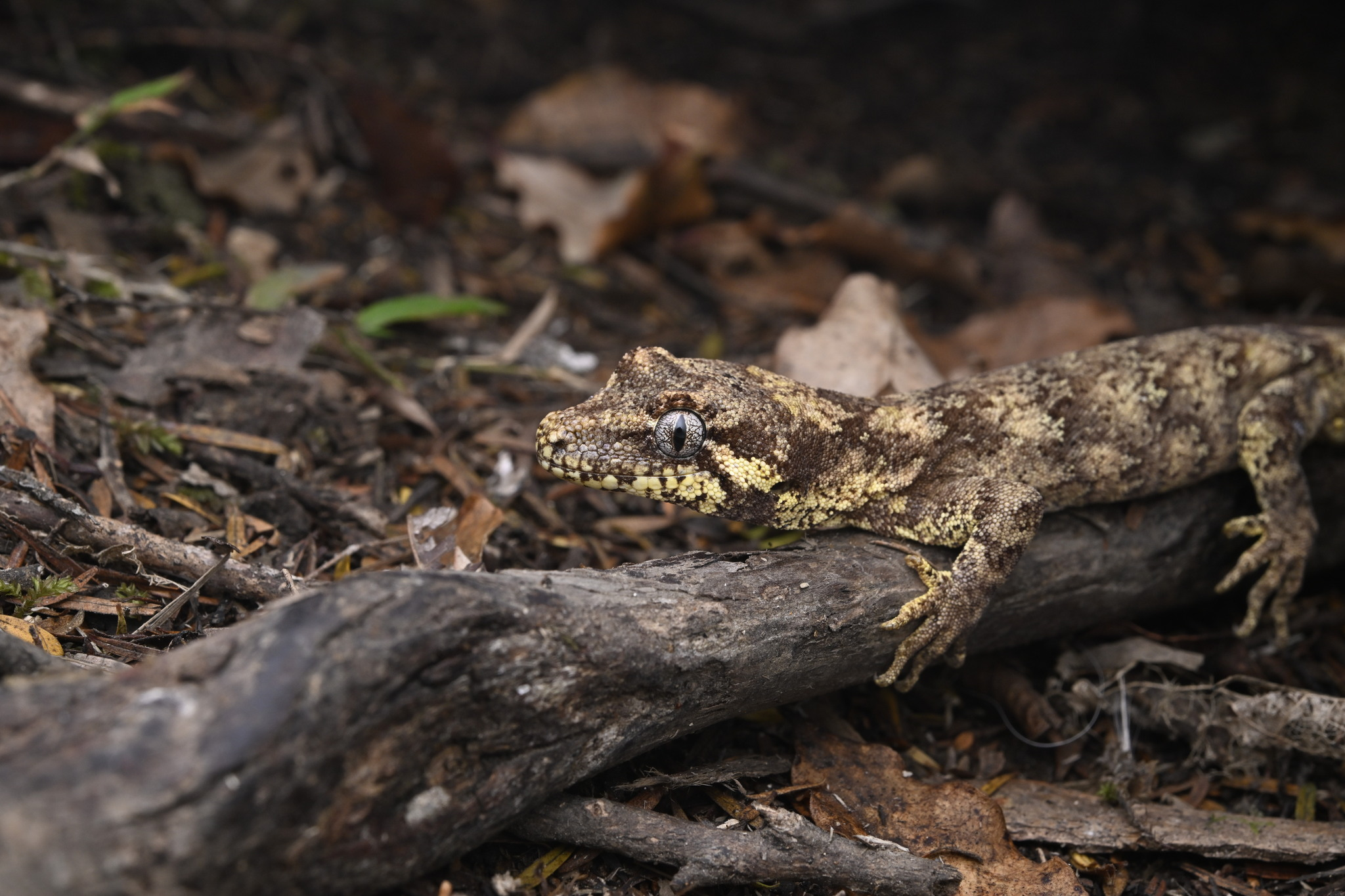

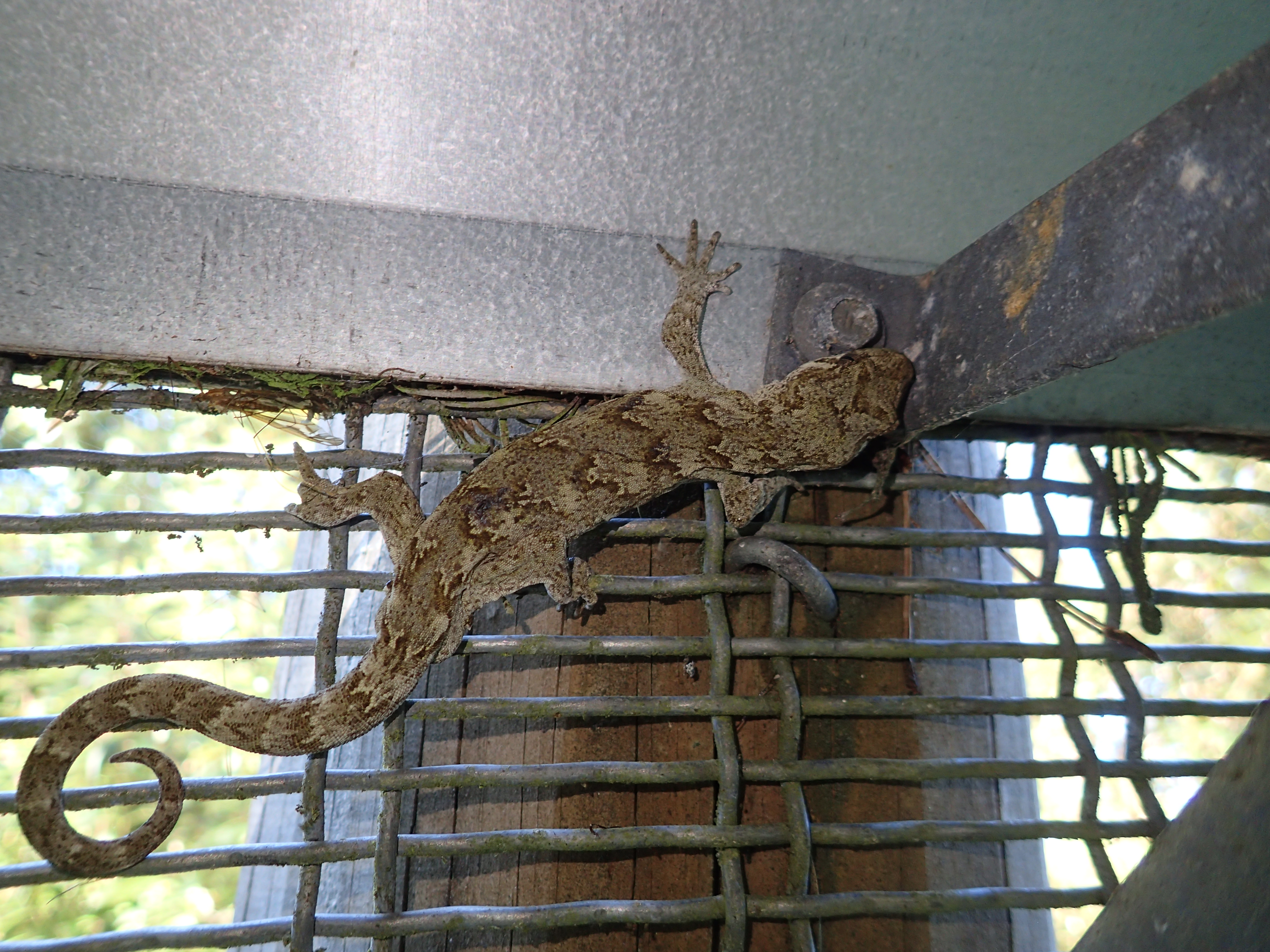

== See also ==
- List of geckos of New Zealand
