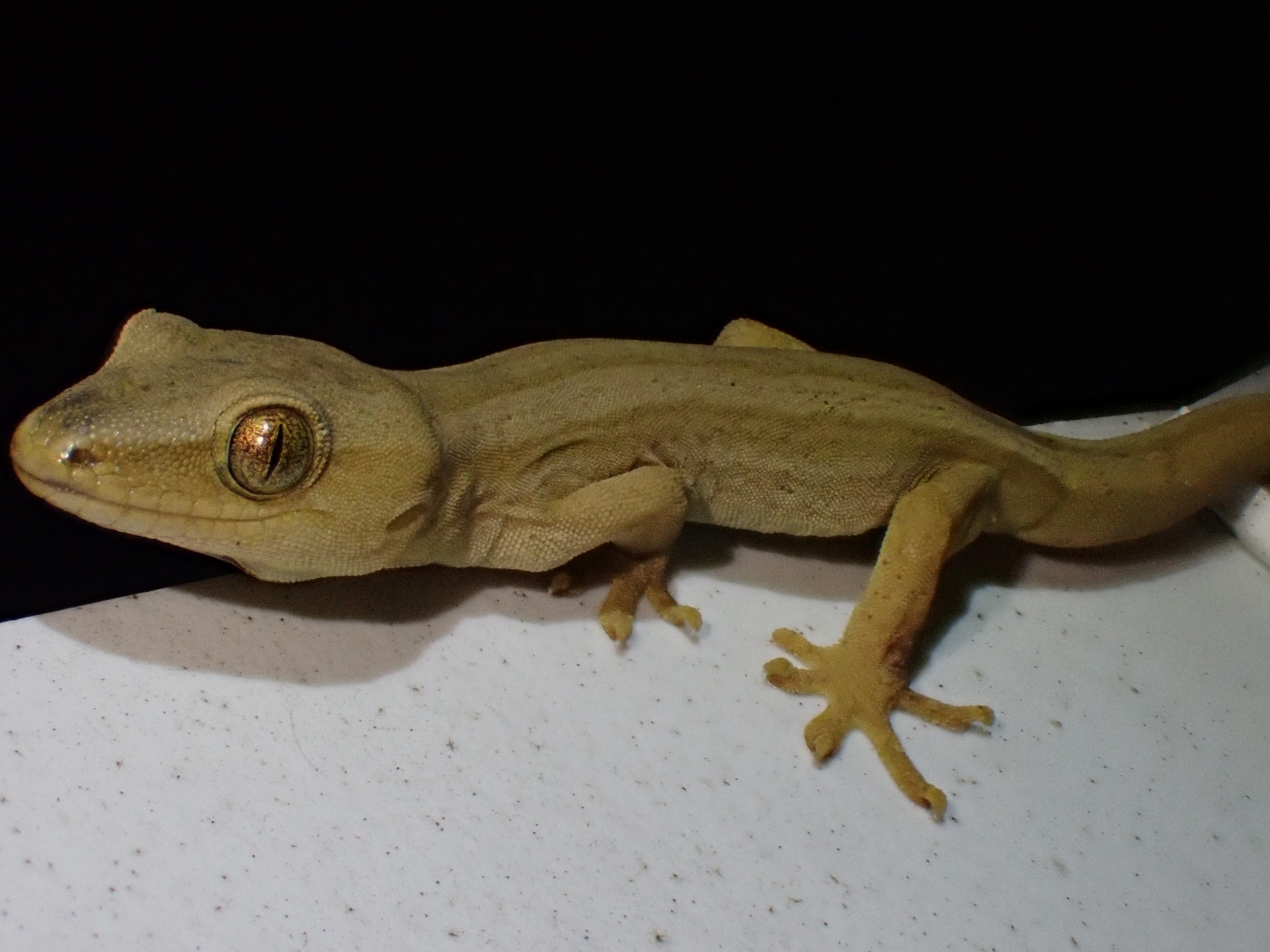

Conservation status
- Near Threatened (IUCN 3.1)
- CITES Appendix III

Scientific classification
- Kingdom: Animalia
- Phylum: Chordata
- Class: Reptilia
- Order: Squamata
- Suborder: Gekkota
- Family: Diplodactylidae
- Genus: Woodworthia
- Species: W. chrysosiretica

Binomial name
- Woodworthia chrysosiretica (Robb, 1980)
- Distribution of the gold-striped gecko on a map of the North Island Known native range

Synonyms
- Hoplodactylus chrysosireticus Robb, 1980; Woodworthia chrysosireticus Robb, 1980

= Gold-striped gecko =

Species of reptile

The gold-striped gecko, gold-stripe gecko, or golden sticky-toed gecko (Woodworthia chrysosiretica) is a species of gecko in the family Diplodactylidae. It is endemic to New Zealand, and is only found in the Taranaki region and Mana Island. The holotype is in the collection of the Museum of New Zealand Te Papa Tongarewa.

The gold-striped geckos can grow to be 14 cm(5.51 inches) long and are brown/yellow with stripes on their backs. They are mostly nocturnal and eat small insects and invertebrates. They live in forests and bushes, but can also live on farmland and urban environments. This species does not lay eggs, instead giving birth to live young.

This species was first described by J. Robb in 1980 as Hoplodactylus chrysosireticus.

From July 1984 to July 1985 the gold-striped gecko appeared on a New Zealand 70 cent stamp as part of an Endangered Animal Wildlife series The IUCN Red List lists them as 'Near Threatened'. The Taranaki Regional Council currently lists this species as 'At Risk.'
