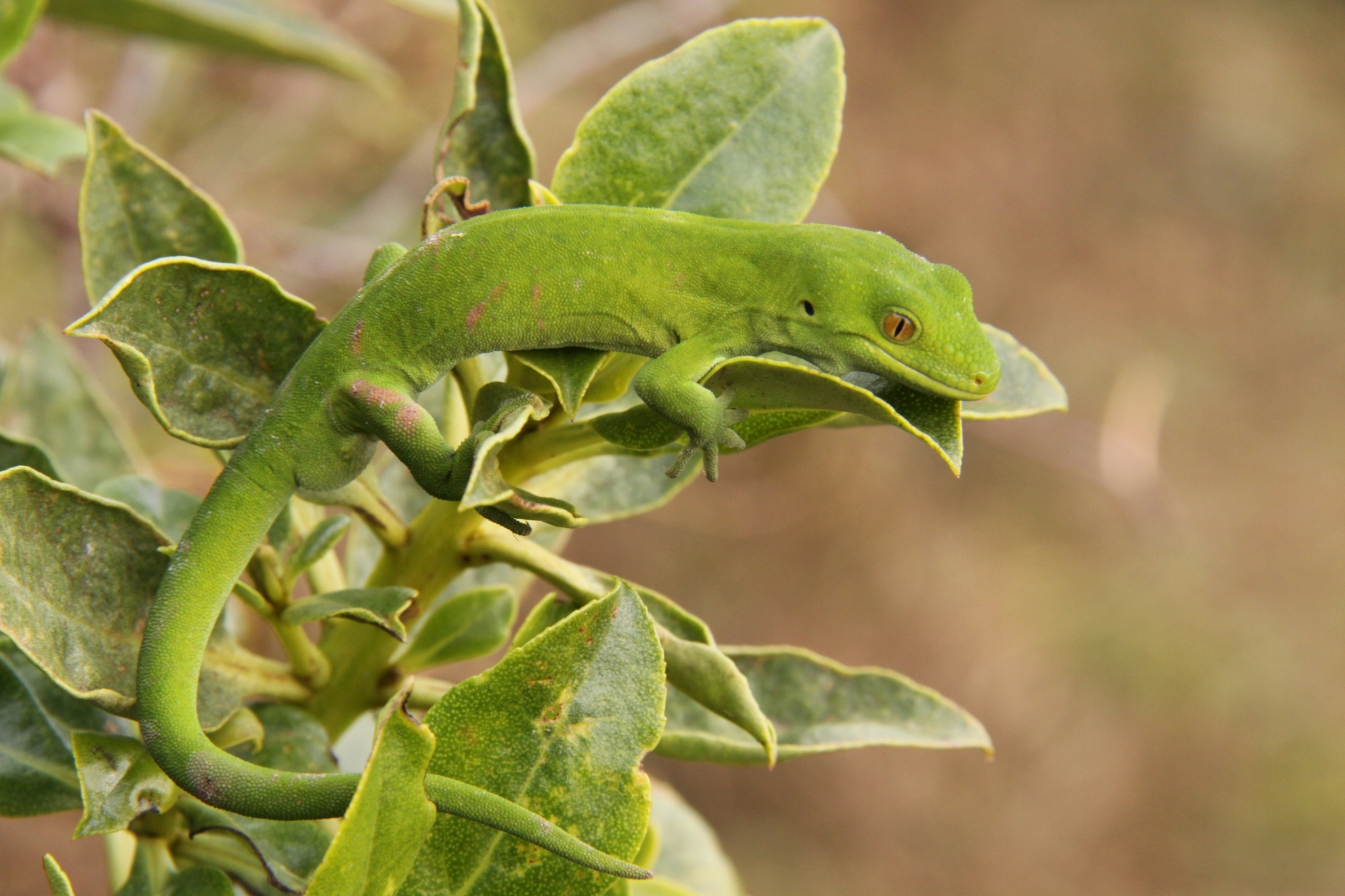
- Photographed on a ngaio tree in the far northern Marlborough Sounds.

Conservation status
- Endangered (IUCN 3.1)
- CITES Appendix II

Scientific classification
- Kingdom: Animalia
- Phylum: Chordata
- Class: Reptilia
- Order: Squamata
- Suborder: Gekkota
- Family: Diplodactylidae
- Genus: Naultinus
- Species: N. manukanus

Binomial name
- Naultinus manukanus (McCann, 1955)
- Distribution of the Marlborough green gecko on a map of the South Island Known native range

Synonyms
- Heteropholis manukanus

= Marlborough green gecko =

Species of lizard

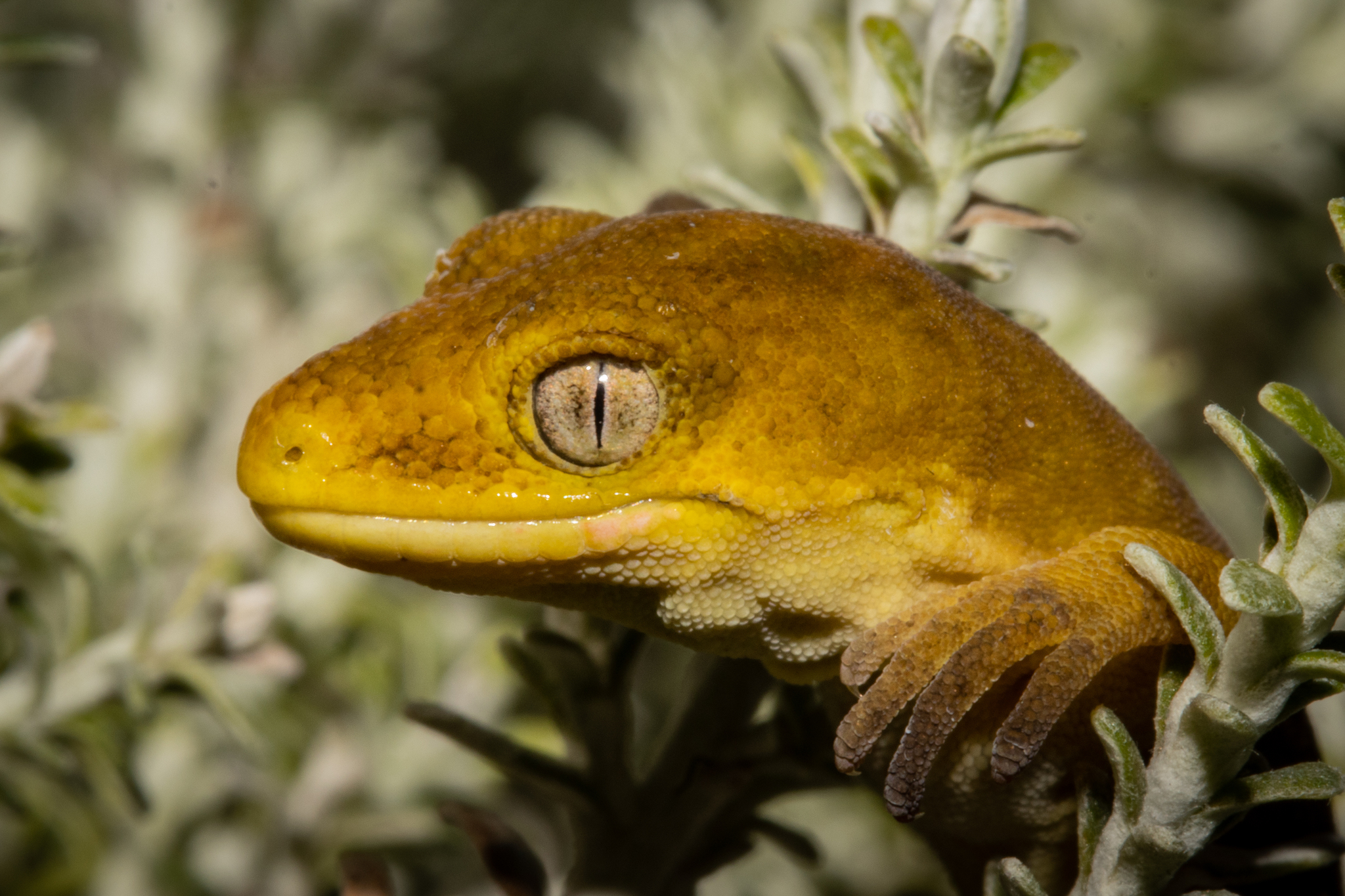
A close up of a Naultinus manukanus with xanthic colouration.

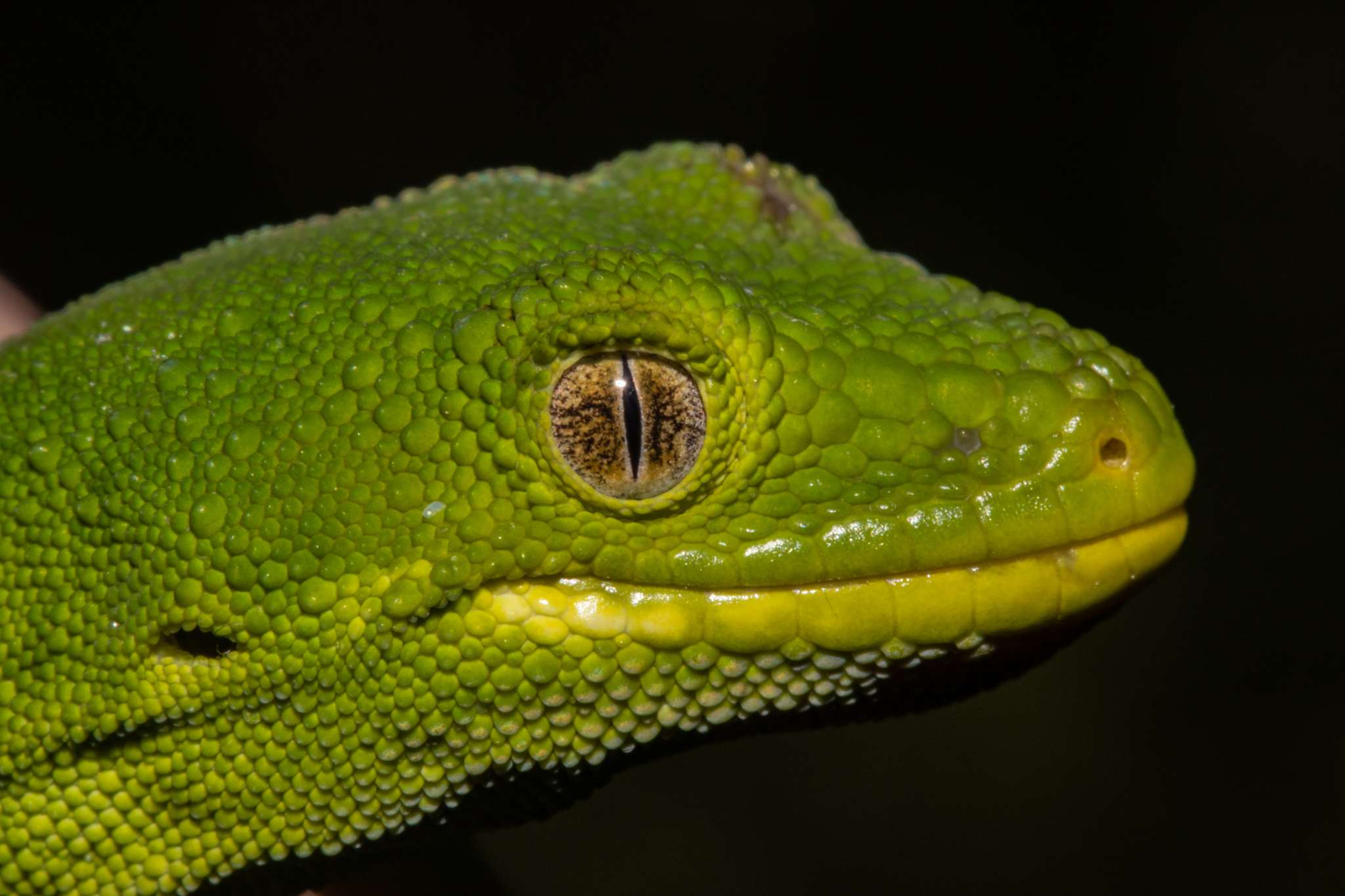
A close up of a Naultinus manukanus in its usual colouration.

Naultinus manukanus, commonly known as the Marlborough Green Gecko or the Manuka gecko, is a small species of gecko endemic to New Zealand. The species' name, manukanus, was derived from this species being commonly found in Mānuka shrubs. The holotype is in the collection of the Museum of New Zealand Te Papa Tongarewa.

== Description ==
N. manukanus is usually bright green. The dorsal surface of N. manukanus is a uniform green which is sometimes paired with small paler spots. These spots can be pale green, yellow, or white. Instead of spots, these geckos may have thin markings on either side of the midline. N. manukanus also has enlarged conical scales, usually present on the snout, head, and along dorsolateral surfaces.

Other identifying features of N. manukanus include a lavender/pink or orange mouth lining that has either a pink or yellow tongue. N. manukanus has narrow toes compared to other species which may have expanded toe pads. The underside of this species' feet is also yellow in colouration.

The pattern of N. manukanus is variable depending on its geographic location. The variation in geographic location also causes variation with the enlargement of the conical scales. Populations from the outer Marlborough sounds are uniform green and usually have few enlarged scales, whereas populations further south have more variable patterns and colours along with distinctive enlarged scales. Some N. manukanus are entirely yellow; this is called a xanthic form.

N. manukanus can be distinguished from most South Island Naultinus due to its plain pattern and more uniform colouration, with the exception of the jeweled gecko (N. gemmeus) and starred gecko (N. stellatus). N. manukanus can be distinguished from all other species of Naultinus through its enlarged conical scales which cover the head, nape, and dorsolateral regions. This excludes the rough gecko (N. rudis) which is a close relative of N. manukanus. N. rudis has enlarged conical scales that cover its entire body compared to the selected areas of N. manukanus. N. manukanus also have a different mouth and tongue colour while the males have different belly colours.

N. manukanus is a sexually dimorphic species, with males and females differing in ventral colour and size. Males are typically smaller than females with a snout to vent length (SVL) of 64–68 mm, whereas females have a SVL of 69–79 mm. The ventral surface of an adult male is a pale blue-white, blue-green or silver whereas females can be distinguished by a pale yellow-green ventral surface.

== Geographic distribution and habitat ==
=== New Zealand range ===
N. manukanus is endemic to New Zealand. N. manukanus populations occur throughout the Marlborough region. Populations can be found as far south as the Wairau River and west to the Bryant and Richmond ranges. Populations of N. manukanu have also been recorded throughout the islands of Marlborough sounds such as Arapawa island. There are also successful translocated populations on Motuara island and Wakaterepapanui island.

=== Habitat ===
N. manukanus usually inhabit coastal and lowland regions. They are commonly found inhabiting coastal and lowland forests, shrublands as well as Muehlenbeckia thickets. N. manukanus is commonly found in Mānuka shrubs, which is reflected in its species name, manukanus. N. manukanus also appears to inhabit scrubby and regenerating habitats often, although that may be due to easy access.

== Ecology ==
=== Life cycle ===
N. manukanus is quite long lived like most of the reptile species in New Zealand. They can live up to 30 years or possibly more; the captive record for N. manukanus is 30 years.

N. manukanus populations may exhibit a female-biased sex ratio at birth based on a 25-year study of a population on Stephans island. The breeding season of N. manukanus occurs between June and October (observed in captivity). The females are viviparous and usually give live birth two young between February and April. The gestation period of these offspring is approximately 7.5 months. These young measure 26–35 mm in SVL, reach maturity within 1–2 years, and are fully grown around 3–4 years of age.

Males exhibit mate guarding behaviour which includes following the females around. They also display aggressive behaviour towards others within their genus, which is during the breeding season. During the mating process, as in many other gecko species, the male bites the female's neck and head repeatedly as he mounts her.

N. manukanus is cathemeral (active both day and night), although it is predominantly diurnal (day-active) and is heliothermic, meaning they require heat by basking under the sun. N. manukanus is arboreal, which explains its prehensile tail.

They are visually cryptic due to their foliage-matching colouration, and usually remain hidden through their slow movement. The crypsis of N. manukanus stems from the native birds being one of their main forms of predators. Birds rely on visual cues from a distance and being visually cryptic is a great form of predator avoidance. N. manukanus are also known to vocalize a barking sound and mouth gape at potential predators and threats.

Movement of N. manukanus is usually associated with moving to a warmer/sunnier spot or retreating into vegetation during harsher weather. N. manukanus moves less on cloudy days and are usually found under the foliage, whereas on clear days they are more active and are usually found basking atop the foliage.

N. manukanus is solitary in nature, like most geckos, although they are found in large densities in some habitats. The neonates (babies) of N. manukanus are commonly found together and with their mothers for the first couple months of their lives, even though they are independent at birth.

== Diet, prey, and predators ==
=== Diet and foraging ===
N. manukanus uses a sit-and-wait foraging strategy where they lie in wait for unsuspecting invertebrates. They heavily rely on visual cues to use this type of foraging strategy.

N. manukanus are omnivores yet are primarily insectivorous. They are known to feed on the small fruits of several plant species and have also been known to feed on nectar. N. manukanus diet suggests that they may also use chemoreception to detect food sources. Due to their arboreal lifestyle their invertebrate prey is composed of moths, flies, spiders, and beetles. They will also consume any other insect that may be present in the foliage.

=== Predators, parasites and diseases ===
N. manukanus previously had few predators except for avians and one reptile (Tuatara) until mammals were introduced. The introduction of predatory mammals has led to a large decline in N. manukanus populations. These predatory mammals include hedgehogs, mustelids, possums, and rats.

N. manukanus have been found infected with ectoparasitic mites in the wild. In a sample group of geckos, nine N. manukanus were found to have mites. Although ectoparasitic mites were found on N. manukanus it is still quite uncommon for them to be a host. Red mites have also been recorded in captive N. manukanus.

The fungus Mucor ramosissimus has been recorded in N. manukanus. Mucor ramosissimu causes black powdery lesions of necrosis and mycotic dermatitis within N. manukanus. The fungal infection of Mucor ramosissimu also causes mycotic osteomyelitis (a bone infection caused by fungi). Protozoal intestinal parasitism by Trichomonas sp. and Nyctotherus sp. has also been recorded within N. manukanus, causing weight loss and loss of appetite. A combination of the intestinal parasitism and fungal infection has led to the death of two N. manukanus (a male and a female) who were reported as dying from mycotic dermatitis with digital gangrene, and osteomyelitis.

Other species of Naultinus have been recorded with disecdysis (shedding issues) and pseudobuphthalmos (build-up of liquid in the spectacle of the eye). These conditions may also affect N. manukanus because they have been documented within the same genus.

== Other information ==
=== Relatives ===
N. manukanus is closely related to N. rudis (rough gecko); they are sister taxa. They are both part of the Naultinus genus yet were previously part of the Heteropholis genus. N. manukanus and N. rudis both share a similar feature of large conical scales. N. rudis has more enlarged conical scales which covers its entire body, compared to N. manukanus, which easily differentiates them. N. manukanus' next closest relative is the starred gecko (N. stellatus), whereas the west coast green gecko (N. tuberculatus) is the sister to the group.

=== Pollination and seed dispersal ===
N. manukanus have been known to feed on small fruits and occasionally the nectar of flowers. This is a common feature of New Zealand geckos and skinks and plays a part in plant pollination and seed dispersal. Geckos (and skinks) were once a part of important plant reproduction in New Zealand. N. manukanus as well as other New Zealand species would disperse seeds from the fruits they consumed up to 20 meters away from the parental plant, allowing germination at a safe distance. Consumption of nectar from flowers would occasionally deposit pollen onto the geckos that would be transported to another flower which would then be pollinated. This was seen in Dactylocnemis geckos but suggests that N. manukanus may play a role in pollination.

=== Conservation status ===
In 2012 the Department of Conservation classified the Marlborough gecko as At Risk under the New Zealand Threat Classification System. It was judged as meeting the criteria for At Risk threat status as a result of it having a low to high ongoing or predicted decline. This gecko is also regarded as being Conservation Dependent. Populations have been threatened through habitat loss/destruction, habitat fragmentation, and the introduction of introduced mammalian predators including rats, mice, mustelids, and possums. N. manukanus populations also struggled with competition for food sources against introduced vespulid wasps.

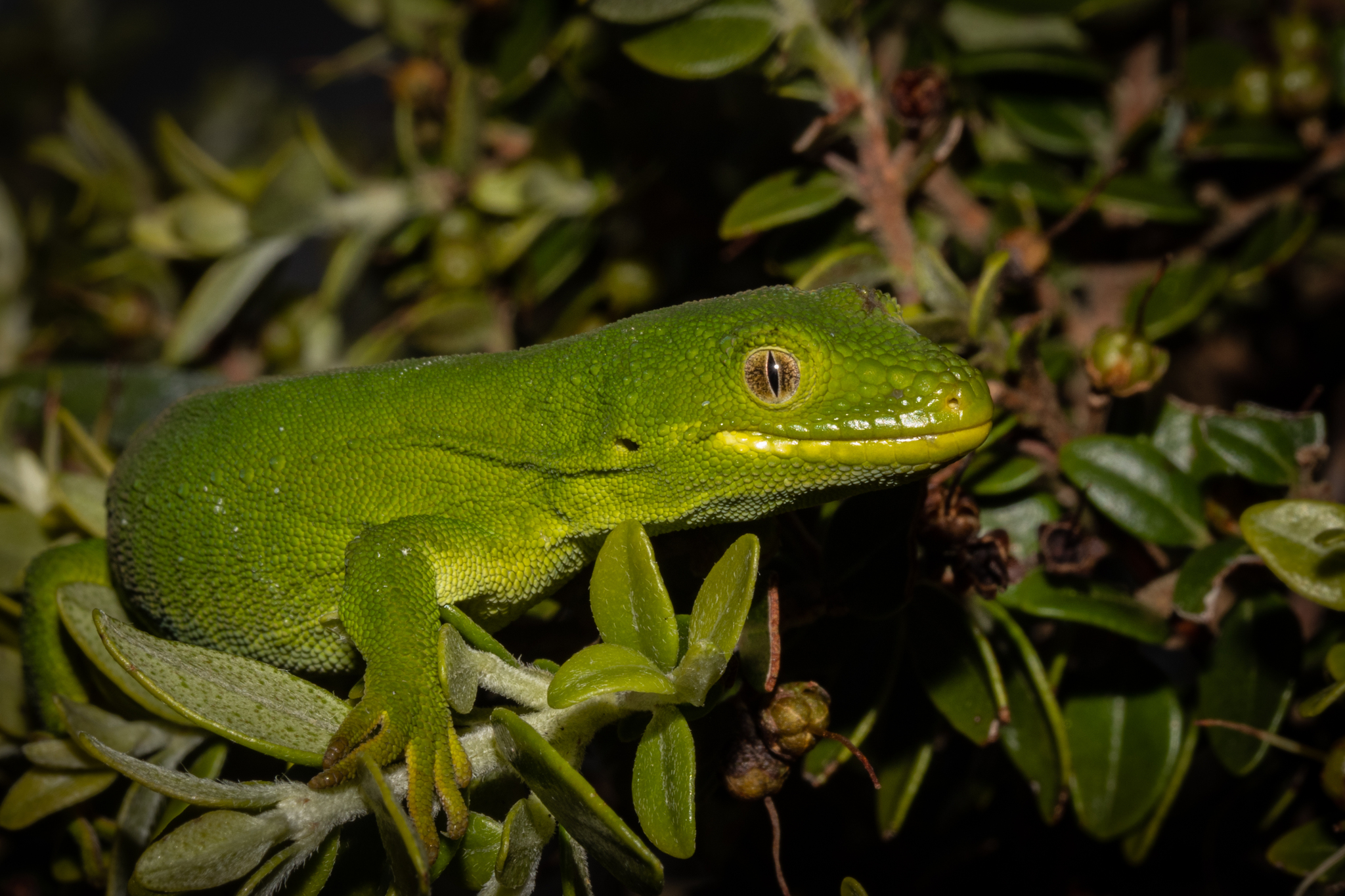
A photo of Naultinus manukanus showing its raised conical scales.

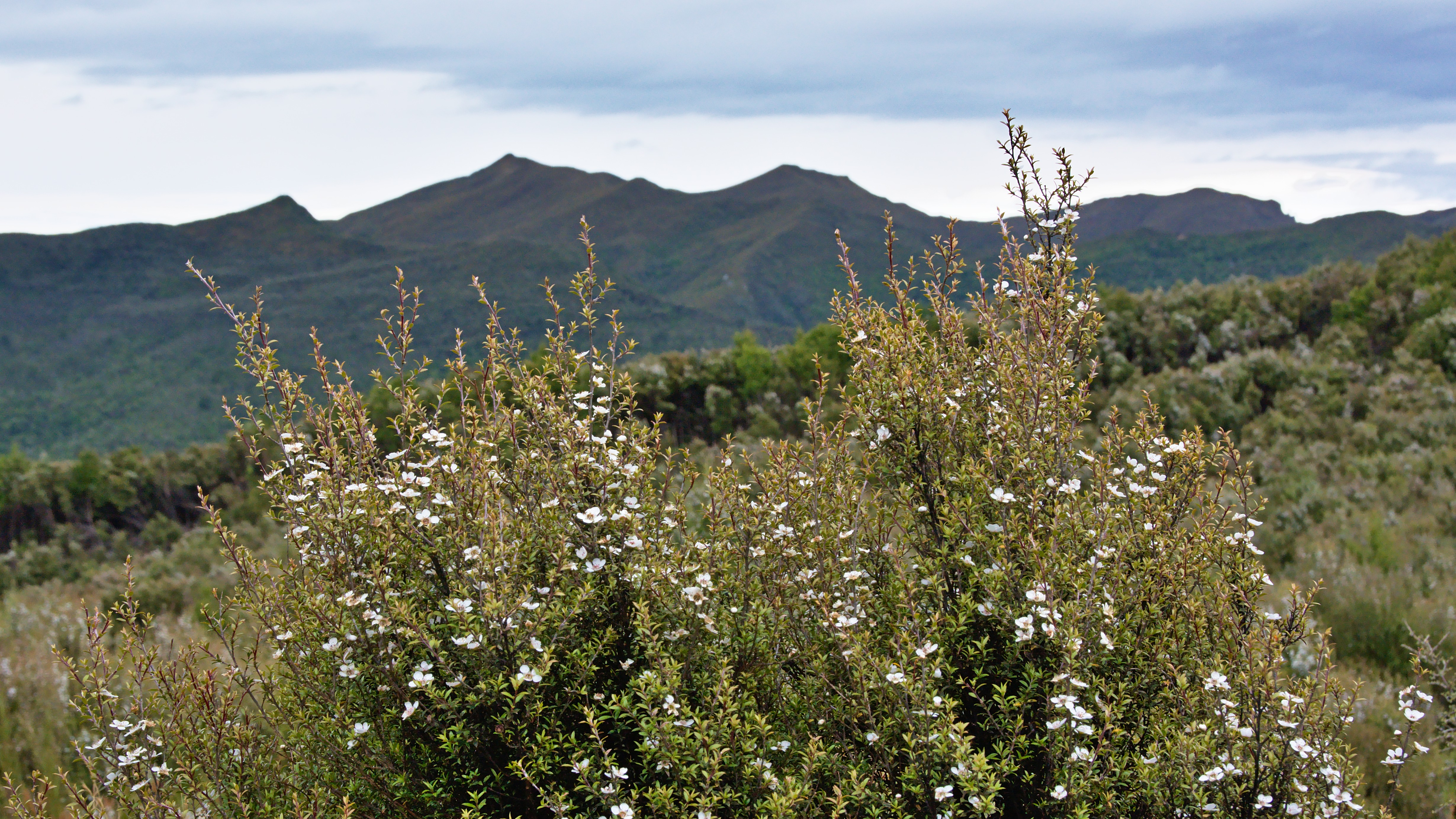
A photograph of a Mānuka bush in flower, from which the species name manukanus is derived.
