= Wildlife smuggling in New Zealand =

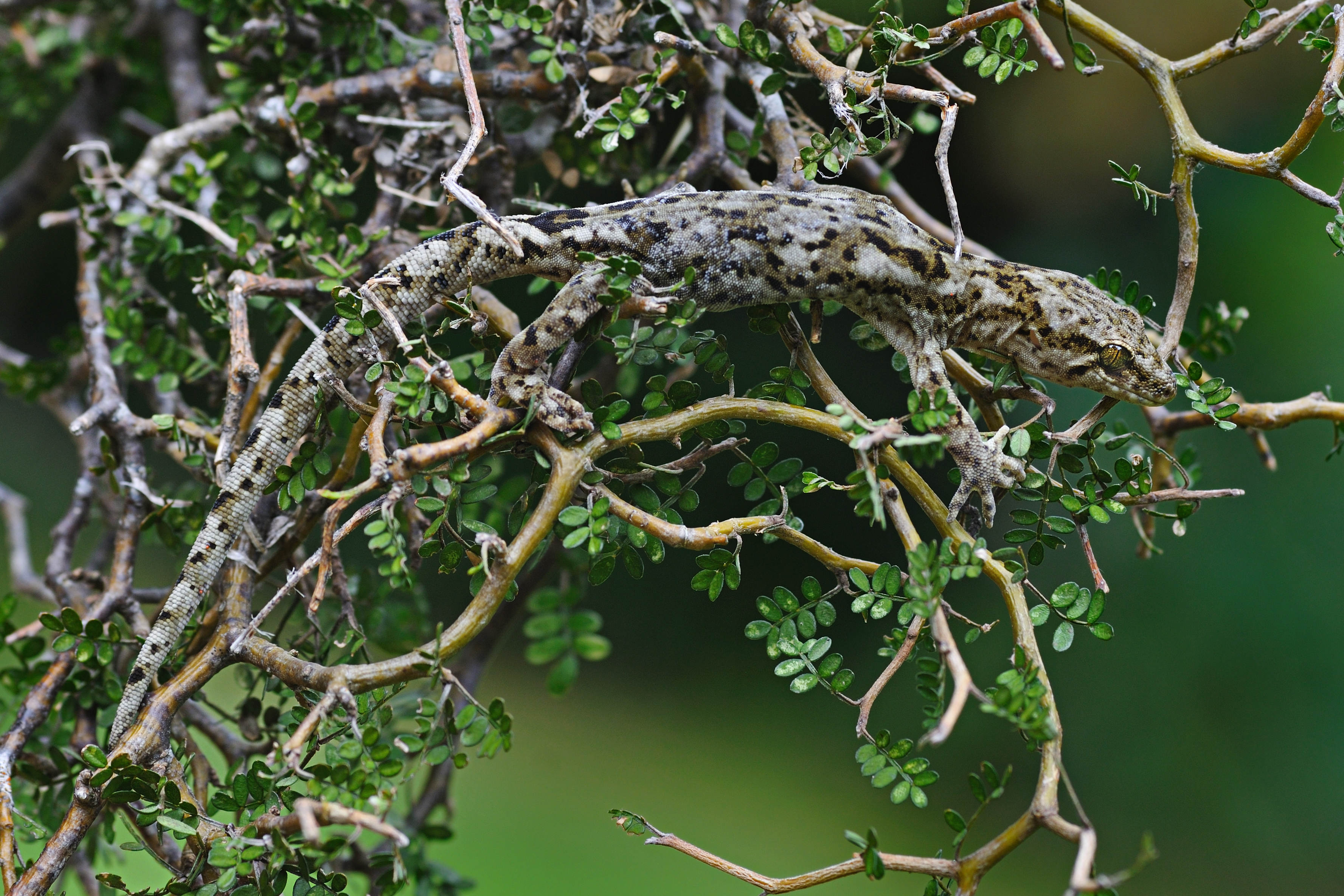
The Canterbury gecko, Woodworthia brunnea, has been a target for wildlife smugglers.

New Zealand has a number of rare and endangered species and there have been cases of wildlife smuggling. New Zealand is a signatory to CITES (Convention on International Trade in Endangered Species of Wild Fauna and Flora) which was set up to ensure that international trade in specimens of wild animals and plants does not threaten their survival. CITES is administered by the Department of Conservation. Prosecutions from smuggling wildlife can be made under the Trade in Endangered Species Act 1989.

The Wildlife Enforcement Group, a three-person team drawn from three government departments (the New Zealand Customs Service, the Ministry of Agriculture and Forestry and the Department of Conservation), was set up in 1992 to investigate wildlife smuggling to and from New Zealand. The WEG's activities led to 24 prosecutions, but the group was gradually disbanded between 2012 and 2014, and since that time there has been no dedicated task force policing wildlife smuggling in New Zealand. The WEG was supposed to have been replaced by a larger Environmental Crime Network, or by a digital hub, but neither eventuated. The disbanding of WEG was seen as creating a potential opportunity for poachers to exploit New Zealand wildlife.

Since then, the Ministry for Primary Industries (MPI – formerly the Ministry of Agriculture and Forestry) and Department of Conservation (DOC) have committed to working together to target wildlife smugglers, with support from Customs, under a Memorandum of Understanding signed in 2017. This collaboration the first two prosecutions for illegally importing elephant ivory in 2013 and 2015, and for importing Asiatic Black bear bile in 2020. The agencies also share information with similar agencies overseas, which can result in convictions elsewhere. But while illegal animal products continue to be intercepted coming into New Zealand, since the WEG was disbanded nobody has been arrested for smuggling native species out of the country; the last successful prosecution, for gecko smuggling, was in 2012.

New Zealand endemic geckos, being colourful and diurnal, are valuable to collectors and sell for thousands of dollars overseas. Smuggling attempts have continued, with a Marlborough green gecko stolen from a visitor-centre terrarium, and a taped-shut lunchbox discovered in 2017 in the Christchurch Botanic Gardens containing 58 native lizards, almost all dead. Herpetologist Carey Knox has recognised individual geckos from populations he studied advertised for sale online. While some New Zealand species were legally exported before the law was changed in 1989, a popular European website for reptile collectors lists species such as harlequin geckos (Tukutuku rakiurae) and jewelled geckos (Naultinus gemmeus) which have never been legally exported. These reptiles are regularly traded at reptile shows in Germany.

Cooperation with overseas agencies resulted in the return to New Zealand of two previously smuggled jewelled geckos from Germany in 2016. One died in quarantine at Wellington Zoo, and the survivor was given a new home at an enclosure at Otago Museum. The gecko could not be returned to the wild due to biosecurity risks, but Knox was able to identify the original plant it had been poached from, and some of that tree was added to its new enclosure.

== Notable incidents ==
Incidents of smuggling in New Zealand include:

- In 1993 a light plane was used to smuggle 31 Australian birds, including two cockatoo species, into New Zealand. In "Operation Icarus" the police made a number of arrests with the eventual conviction of six people in New Zealand and another six in Australia.
- In 1997 over 600 Australian birds were being smuggled through New Zealand destined for Europe, the United States, and Japan.
- Freddie Angell was a recidivist wildlife smuggler who spent four years in jail for wildlife smuggling.
- A German tourist was fined $12,000 for attempting to smuggle Northland green geckos out of the country in his underwear.
- Two Czech botanists were convicted in 2004 of attempting to smuggle 363 wild plants, including 93 endemic orchids.
- In January 2010 a German man who tried to smuggle 44 live geckos and skinks out of the country in his underwear was sentenced to 12 weeks in jail. He was caught trying to board a flight at Christchurch Airport with the animals.
- In March 2010 two people were jailed for 18 weeks after taking jewelled geckos from the Otago Peninsula. They were arrested after a German man was found in Christchurch with 16 geckos in tubes in his backpack. He was sentenced to 15 weeks in prison.
- Two Germans were jailed for four and a half months in March 2011 for attempting to smuggle jewelled geckos out of the country, and in May 2012 a German man was jailed for 16 weeks after being found guilty of hunting and possessing four jewelled geckos.
- In September 2012 a Tongan man was sentenced to 165 hours community service for attempting to import 51 carvings made from Humpback Whale bones
- An Auckland-resident Acupuncturist was convicted and fined $4,000 for attempting to import medicines containing endangered plants in his luggage in March 2013
- The first conviction for illegally importing elephant ivory into New Zealand was recorded in July 2013 when an Auckland man appeared in court and was fined $12,000
- A Vietnamese national was charged under the Biosecurity Act after being caught trying to smuggle live tropical fish into New Zealand in his trouser pockets in August 2013
- A woman was convicted and fined $10,000 after being found with almost 50 raw swiftlet birds nests in December 2015. The nests are typically used to make bird's nest soup.
- The second conviction for illegally importing elephant ivory occurred in December 2015 when Napier man Paddy Cooper was fined $8,000 for importing ivory through the mail system
- A man was stopped on arrival from Vietnam in May 2016 and found to have 5 Siamese fighting fish in his luggage
- In October 2016 an Auckland-based zoology student was convicted for attempting to import a corn snake, five veiled chameleons, and an iguana
- Information gathered during the Paddy Cooper prosecution was passed to US authorities resulting in the imprisonment of a Californian man in November 2016 for supplying elephant ivory to Cooper
- In February 2017 a Pahiatua man was convicted and fined for importing Malaysian moon moth eggs
- In July 2017 a Marlborough green gecko was suspected to have been stolen from a terrarium at the Department of Conservation visitor centre in Fiordland National Park where he had lived for 30 years. No arrests were made and the gecko was not recovered.
- In August 2017 a taped-shut lunchbox was discovered in the Christchurch Botanic Gardens containing 58 native lizards of various species, only 4 of which were still alive. This is likely to be the result of an unsuccessful smuggling attempt.
- In January 2018 an Auckland man was fined $2,250 for smuggling plant cuttings and seeds
- In August 2019 a Fijian woman was refused entry to New Zealand after being found smuggling plant seeds inside medicine containers
- In December 2019, a Tauranga woman was charged with 7 offences for attempting to illegally import plants, cuttings and seeds
- In March 2020 a Chinese woman was fined $7,500 for attempting to smuggle 12 vials of Asiatic Black bear bile into New Zealand
- An Auckland woman was fined $31,500 for selling birds nests in January 2021. Swiftlet nests are prohibited in New Zealand and the woman was selling them on WeChat
- A cactus smuggler was sentenced to intensive supervision for 12 months and 100 hours' community work after attempting to illegally import 947 succulents in February 2021
- In April 2022, a Tauranga man was fined $5,250 for attempting to illegally import plants through the mail
- In December 2022, officers from the Department of Conservation seized rhino horn specimens during search warrants at two houses in Auckland
- In 2023, fourteen jewelled geckos were discovered by Dutch wildlife authorities. Six of the geckos were returned to New Zealand in 2026, where they spent 60 days in quarantine.

== See also ==
- Conservation in New Zealand
- Animal welfare in New Zealand
- Wildlife smuggling in southern Africa
