= Common green gecko =

The common green gecko has been split into the following species:

- Auckland green gecko, Naultinus elegans
- Wellington green gecko, Naultinus punctatus
