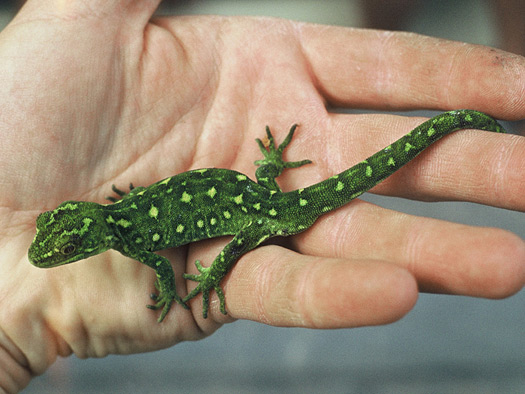

Conservation status
- Nationally Vulnerable (NZ TCS)
- CITES Appendix II

Scientific classification
- Kingdom: Animalia
- Phylum: Chordata
- Class: Reptilia
- Order: Squamata
- Suborder: Gekkota
- Family: Diplodactylidae
- Genus: Naultinus
- Species: N. tuberculatus

Binomial name
- Naultinus tuberculatus (McCann, 1955)
- Distribution of the West Coast green gecko on a map of the South Island Known native range

Synonyms
- Heteropholis tuberculatus; Naultinus elegans tuberculatus; Heteropholis poecilochlorus; Naultinus elegans poecilochlorus

= West Coast green gecko =

Species of lizard

The West Coast green gecko (Naultinus tuberculatus) is a species of the family Gekkonidae (gecko).

== Taxonomy and naming ==
This species was originally placed in the genus Heteropholis by Charles McCann, and was also considered a subspecies of Naultinus elegans. It is also known as the Lewis Pass green gecko, mossy gecko, or warty tree gecko.

== Distribution ==
The West Coast green gecko is endemic to the South Island of New Zealand, from Stockton near Granity south to Hokitika, as well as from Haast to the Lewis Pass.

== Habitat ==
N. tuberculatus lives in shrub and forest, preferring the canopy of mānuka and kānuka in particular. It has a prehensile tail which aids its climbing, and is active during the day.

== Description ==
This gecko has a "mossy" appearance due to the complex patterns of white and yellow shades on the background green coloration of the body. The eyes are quite small, and can be olive or brown. The mouth lining is a dark blue, and the tongue can either be black or dark blue. The toes, which the colour of range from being white to a yellow-green, are narrow and tapering. There is usually a small spot of light yellow at the corners of the mouth.

Length can reach 85 mm, snout to vent.

This gecko can be quite easily mistaken for the Nelson green gecko (N. stellatus), but can be distinguished by both the colour of the tongue and the shape of the snout. The tongue of a Nelson green gecko varies from being yellow to a warm orange; the snout is also longer and more shallow in comparison to the West Coast green gecko.

== Ecology ==
This gecko is diurnal and arboreal. Young are born between March and May, and have more conspicuous markings than the adults.

Reproduction is viviparous.

== Conservation ==
The Department of Conservation (DOC) initially classified the West Coast green gecko as At Risk under the New Zealand Threat Classification System, and in 2012 changed its status to Nationally Vulnerable. The species is in demand by reptile poachers.

A $1 million project to replace Greymouth's ageing reservoir was halted in May 2021 because the site in Cobden needed to be searched for West Coast green geckos. The project manager stated (incorrectly), "No one has found one south of the Buller River yet, but DOC seems to think there are some here. These are the things that cause headaches."
