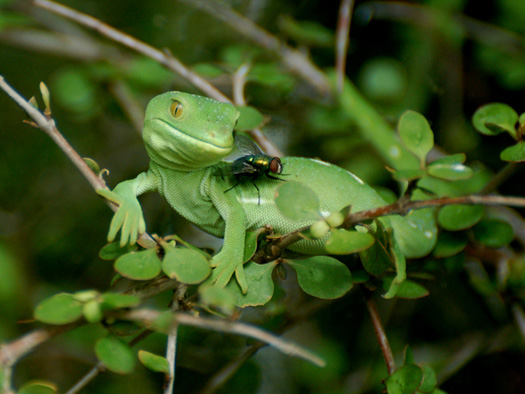

Conservation status
- Gradual Decline (NZ TCS)
- CITES Appendix II

Scientific classification
- Kingdom: Animalia
- Phylum: Chordata
- Class: Reptilia
- Order: Squamata
- Suborder: Gekkota
- Family: Diplodactylidae
- Genus: Naultinus
- Species: N. punctatus

Binomial name
- Naultinus punctatus Gray, 1843
- Distribution of the Wellington green gecko on a map of the North Island Known native range

Synonyms
- Gymnodactylus punctatus; Hoplodactylus punctatus; Naultinus elegans punctatus; Naultinus elegans pentagonalis

= Wellington green gecko =

Species of lizard

The Wellington green gecko (Naultinus punctatus) is a species of gecko found only in the southern half of the North Island of New Zealand. It was previously considered a subspecies of the Auckland green gecko, and together called the common green gecko.

The Wellington green gecko is much larger and more heavily built than the Auckland green gecko and can be distinguished by the yellow soles on its feet instead of grey-green. It lives arboreally in scrub and forest areas, especially kanuka and manuka. Although it hunts nocturnally, for moths and flies, it also likes to sun-bask. It displays an aggressive behaviour, baring its open blue mouth and barking if provoked.

== Conservation status ==
In 2012 the Department of Conservation classified the Wellington green gecko as At Risk under the New Zealand Threat Classification System. It was judged as meeting the criteria for At Risk threat status as a result of it having a low to high ongoing or predicted decline. This gecko is also regarded as being Data Poor.

== Conservation efforts ==
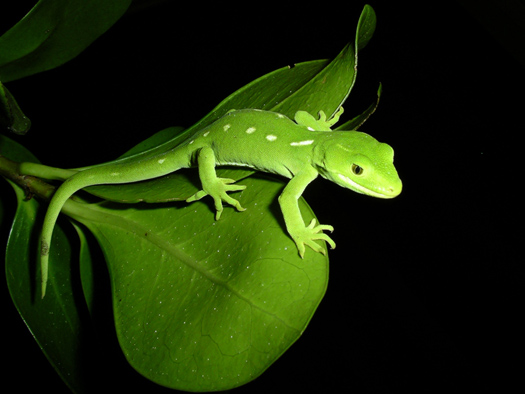
Naultinus punctatus

The Department of Conservation has translocated Wellington green geckos to several locations. From 1997 to 2001 22 Wellington green geckos (8 males, 4 females, 10 unknown) were translocated to Mana Island. The geckos appear to be established on Mana Island. Between 2006 and 2013 over 90 Wellington green geckos were released on Matiu / Somes Island. All were photographed and their unique markings recorded. Early in 2015 a young female gecko was discovered that had markings that did not match any of those recorded. This indicated that a breeding population had been established on the island.
