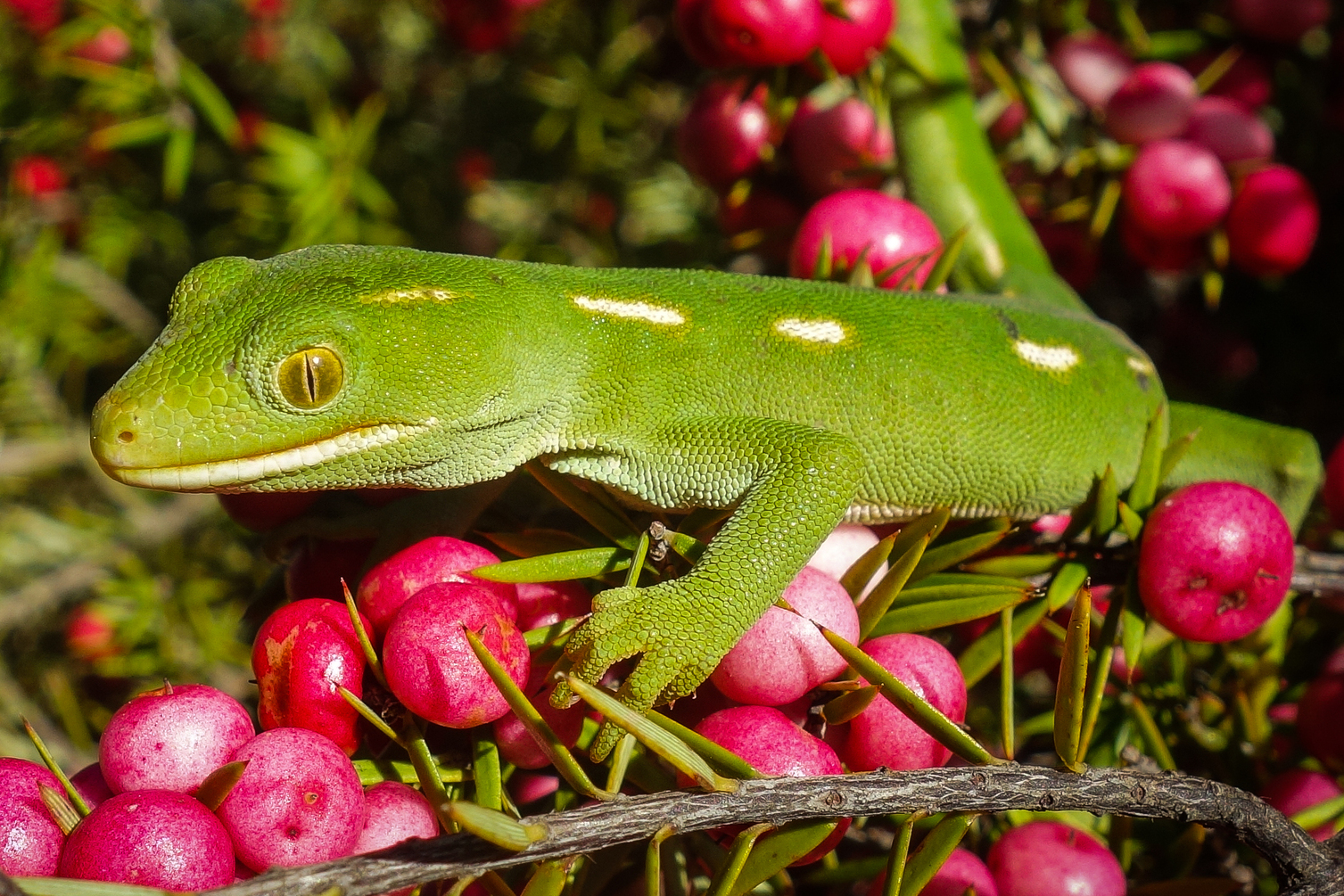

Conservation status
- Gradual Decline (NZ TCS)
- CITES Appendix II

Scientific classification
- Kingdom: Animalia
- Phylum: Chordata
- Class: Reptilia
- Order: Squamata
- Suborder: Gekkota
- Family: Diplodactylidae
- Genus: Naultinus
- Species: N. flavirictus

Binomial name
- Naultinus flavirictus Hitchmough, Nielsen, Lysaght, & Bauer, 2021
- Distribution of the Aupouri green gecko on a map of the North Island Known native range

= Aupouri green gecko =

Species of reptile

The Aupōuri green gecko (Naultinus flavirictus), also known as the North Cape green gecko or yellow-lipped green gecko, is a species of gecko in the family Diplodactylidae. While the existence of the species was known for many years, it was undescribed until early 2021, with its scientific name being Naultinus 'North Cape' prior to description as N. flavirictus.

It is endemic to the Aupōuri Peninsula of the North Island of New Zealand. It is a diurnal species that inhabits scrubland and forests, inhabiting foliage such as those of mānuka and kānuka trees. It can be distinguished from other species in the genus by the diagnostic yellow color at the corners of the mouth, which are also what give it its specific epithet. The Department of Conservation gives N. flavirictus a conservation status of At Risk, with a declining population.
