= Nigel (gannet) =

Bird in New Zealand (died 2018)

Nigel (died 2018) was an Australasian gannet who lived on Mana Island, off the coast of the city of Porirua in New Zealand, where conservationists were attempting to re-establish a gannet colony on the island. He was the island's only gannet for most of his time there, and was nicknamed "no mates Nigel" and the "world's loneliest seabird". Nigel chose a concrete statue of a fake gannet as a mate and made a nest for it. His death in 2018 received worldwide media attention.

== Background ==
Mana Island, west off the coast of the city of Porirua, previously had a colony of gannets, but pests had caused them to disappear. Attempts to bring the gannets back started with the eradication of the pests. Following that, starting in 1998, 80 concrete gannet decoys were placed on the island, fake bird guano (faeces) was painted on the ground, and solar-powered speakers were placed to broadcast gannet calls. However, the decoys did not attract any gannets and became covered in weeds, and thus were moved to another spot on the island in 2012. Gannets continued not to roost there, except for a few short visits, until Nigel appeared in 2015.

== Life ==
Nigel came to Mana Island in about 2015, although different conservationists provide different years. It is not known where he came from and there were no nearby gannet colonies. Ranger Chris Bell said when Nigel arrived that "we think he must be a young male kicked out of another colony". Massey University behavioural psychology professor Dianne Brunton suggested that Nigel was looking for a mate and found the concrete birds. She also suggested that Nigel might actually be female. It is not known where he would go when he would fly away from the island.

Volunteers would call him "no mates" Nigel because he was the only living gannet on the island. He had chosen one of the concrete birds as his mate, made a nest for it, would groom it, and would try to communicate with it. The nest was made of seaweed and twigs and was near the edge of a cliff. Real birds that appeared on the island never interested him. In January 2018 three new gannets appeared on the island after the Department of Conservation (DOC) moved the position of the speakers, so that birds at sea could hear the noises better, but he did not befriend them. They were on one side of the colony and Nigel was on the other side.

== Death ==
Nigel was found dead in late January 2018 in his nest, next to his concrete mate, and surrounded by the other concrete gannets. This was only a few weeks after the other gannets had appeared on the island. News reports on this death were made throughout the world, including from BBC News, The New York Times and The Washington Post. The New York Times called him "the world's loneliest seabird" and The Washington Post called him a 'hero'. Whilst many considered the story of Nigel to be a tragedy, others, such as conservationists, considered him to be a 'hero' as he acted as an 'advertisement' for other gannets to inhabit the island. Ranger Bell suggested at the time of Nigel's death that he "died right at the beginning of something great" because of the three new gannets at the island. However, they eventually flew away and as of 2022, no gannets inhabit Mana Island.

A few weeks before the death, glyphosate herbicide was sprayed around the colony. DOC became concerned about the possibility that the routine spraying caused his death. A necropsy found that he had suffered from kidney damage. The report could neither confirm nor deny that the spray caused his death. DOC decided that his death was of natural causes, with their seabird expert saying that he would have had to breathe in the spray, which is believed to be non-toxic to birds. Nigel was not there during the spraying, and the spray would have dried within minutes. DOC did not want the necropsy to go public due to fears that it would "spiral out to a global scale as before". Nigel's body was put in a freezer in a DOC facility in Porirua which contains other corpses of birds. It remains there as of 2020.

== Legacy ==
The volunteer group Friends of Mana and the iwi Ngāti Toa initially discussed plans on creating a memorial for Nigel, but the discussion fizzled out. In 2022 the Canadian band The Burning Hell released a song about Nigel. Internet search engine queries for "world's loneliest bird" or "saddest bird" return Nigel.

== See also ==
- George (snail), a 'lonely' snail
- Jeremy (snail), a 'lonely' snail
- Trevor (duck), a 'lonely' duck
