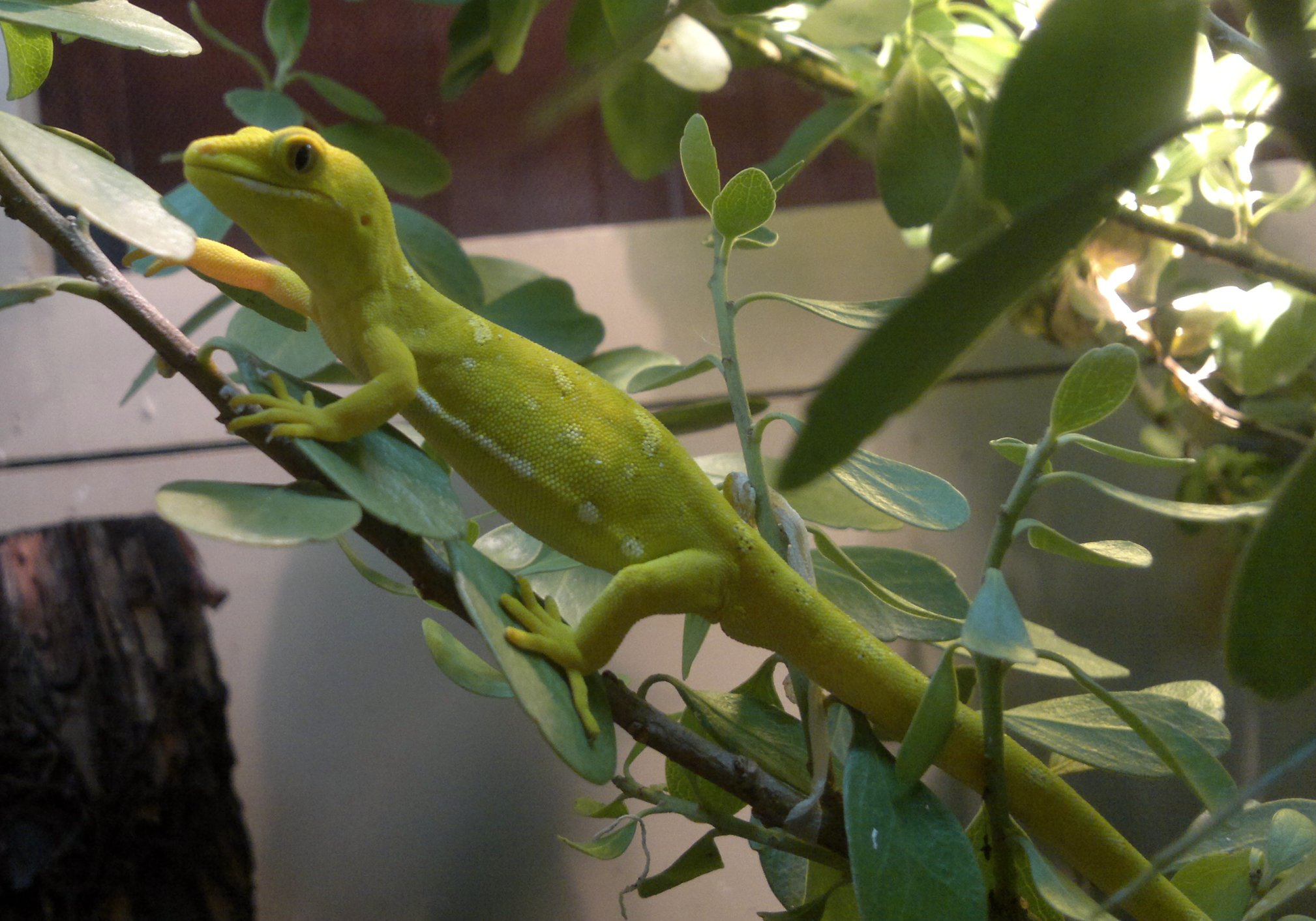

Conservation status
- Gradual Decline (NZ TCS)
- CITES Appendix II (CITES)

Scientific classification
- Kingdom: Animalia
- Phylum: Chordata
- Class: Reptilia
- Order: Squamata
- Suborder: Gekkota
- Family: Diplodactylidae
- Genus: Naultinus
- Species: N. elegans

Binomial name
- Naultinus elegans Gray, 1842
- Distribution of the Auckland green gecko on the North Island map Known native range

Synonyms
- Gymnodactylus elegans; Hoplodactylus elegans; Naultinus elegans elegans; Naultinus sulphureus

= Auckland green gecko =

Species of lizard

The Auckland green gecko (Naultinus elegans), also known as the elegant gecko, is a species of gecko found only in the northern half of the North Island of New Zealand, except north of Whangaroa.

== Taxonomy ==
The species was described by John Edward Gray in 1842. In 1872, Frederick Hutton described the Nelson green gecko as a subspecies, Naultinus elegans stellatus, which was elevated to species status in 1982. In 1980, the Wellington green gecko was synonymised as a subspecies of Naultinus elegans, with the Auckland green gecko being referred to as Naultinus elegans elegans and the Wellington green gecko as Naultinus elegans punctatus. In 2014 the species name was standardised as Naultinus punctatus. The Wellington green gecko is found in the southern half of the North Island, and can hybridise with the Auckland green gecko in places where their ranges overlap.

== Description ==
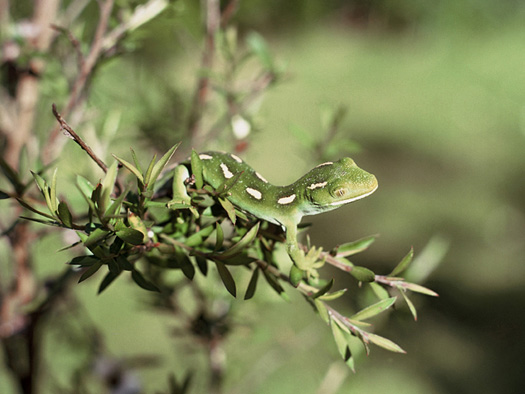
Naultinus elegans

Gray's original text (the type description)

Thumbs clawed: green, rather paler beneath; streak along the under lip, the ears, two arched stripes on the top of the head, irregular shaped spots on each side of the back and hind legs, interrupted streak along each side of the body and tail, white, with a narrow black edge, with a cross series of 3 compressed larger scales at the base of the tail.

The species can grow up to 75 mm (3.0 in) in length, and is recognisable by its bright green colouration.

Apart from range, the Auckland green gecko differs from the Wellington green gecko in that it is marginally smaller and more slender in build and also the undersurfaces of the feet and toes in elegans are coloured grey green, while they are yellow in colouration in the latter species.

== Distribution and habitat ==
The species is found in the upper half of the North Island, except north of Whangaroa, as well as four of the islands of the Hauraki Gulf.

== Conservation status ==
In 2012 the Department of Conservation classified the Auckland green gecko as At Risk under the New Zealand Threat Classification System. It was judged as meeting the criteria for At Risk threat status as a result of it having a low to high ongoing or predicted decline.

== See also ==
- List of geckos of New Zealand
