= Trade in Endangered Species Act 1989 =

Act of Parliament in New Zealand

Trade in Endangered Species Act

New Zealand Parliament
- Long title: An Act to further the protection and conservation of endangered species of wild fauna and flora by regulating the export and import of such species and any product derived from those species

Legislative history
- Passed: 1989

Related legislation
- Wildlife Act 1953
- Status: Current legislation

The Trade in Endangered Species Act is an Act of Parliament that was passed in New Zealand in 1989. It is administered by the Department of Conservation.

== See also ==
- CITES
- Conservation in New Zealand
- Wildlife smuggling in New Zealand
