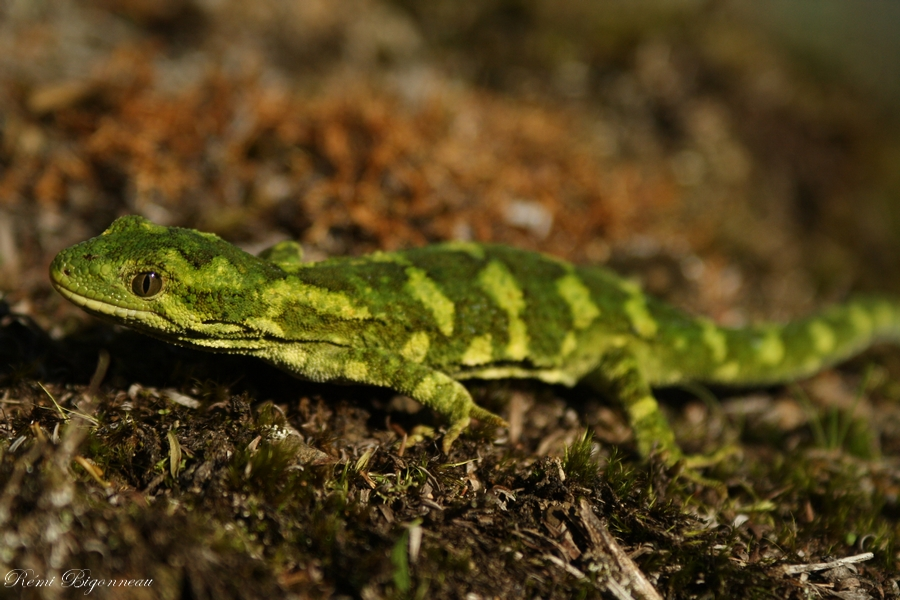

Conservation status
- Endangered (IUCN 3.1)
- CITES Appendix II

Scientific classification
- Kingdom: Animalia
- Phylum: Chordata
- Order: Squamata
- Suborder: Gekkota
- Family: Diplodactylidae
- Genus: Naultinus
- Species: N. rudis

Binomial name
- Naultinus rudis (Fischer, 1882)
- Distribution of the rough gecko on a map of the South Island Known native range

= Rough gecko =

Species of lizard

The rough gecko (Naultinus rudis) is a species of gecko in the family Gekkonidae native to New Zealand. It is endemic to the Kaikōura Ranges.

== Conservation status ==
As of 2012 the Department of Conservation (DOC) classified the Rough gecko as Nationally Vulnerable under the New Zealand Threat Classification System.
