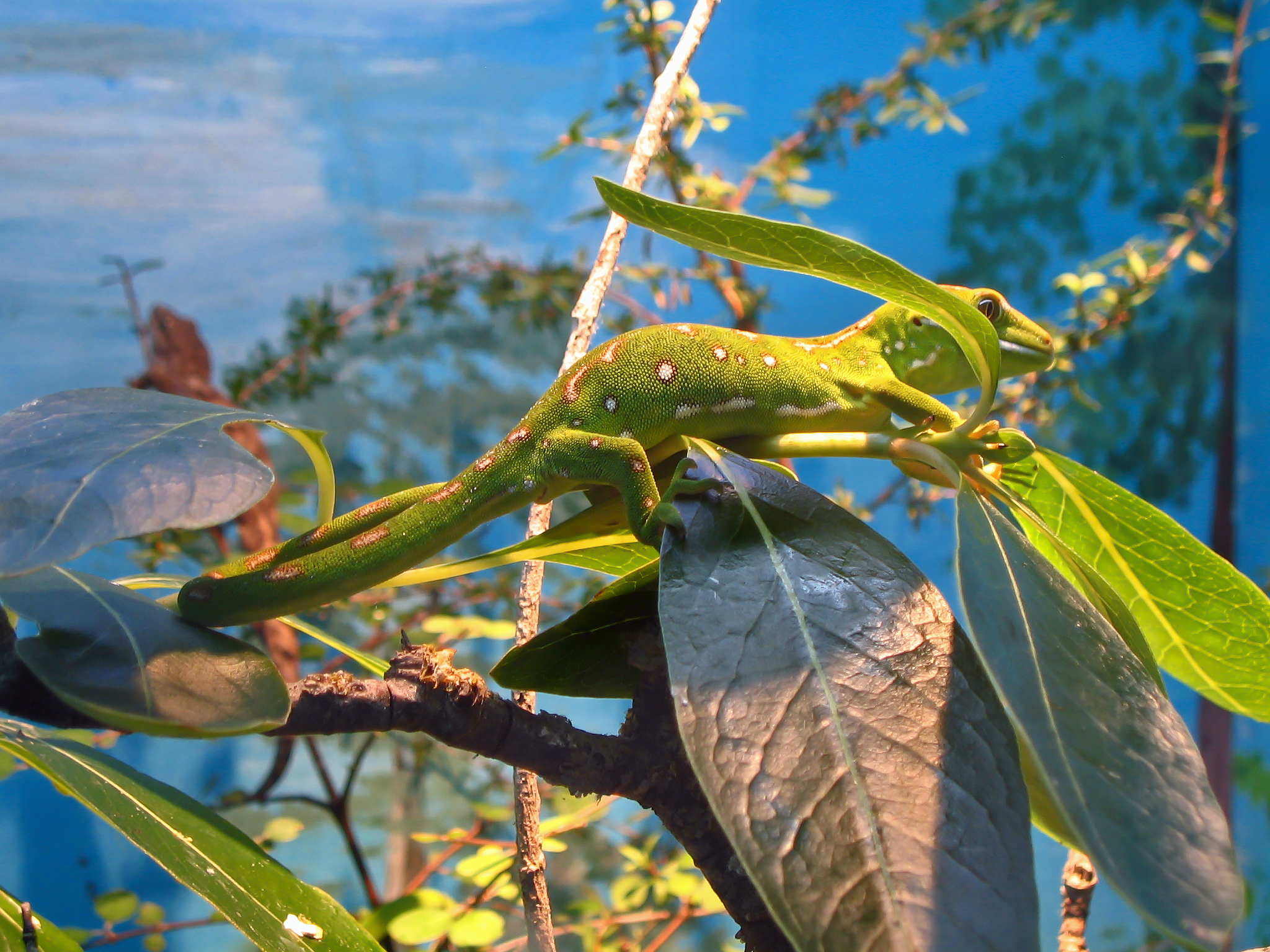
- In captivity at Orana Wildlife Park, Christchurch

Conservation status
- Sparse (NZ TCS)
- CITES Appendix II

Scientific classification
- Kingdom: Animalia
- Phylum: Chordata
- Class: Reptilia
- Order: Squamata
- Suborder: Gekkota
- Family: Diplodactylidae
- Genus: Naultinus
- Species: N. grayii

Binomial name
- Naultinus grayii Bell, 1843
- Distribution of the Northland green gecko on a map of the North Island Known native range

Synonyms
- Naultinus grayii Bell, 1843; Gymnodactylus grayii — A.H.A. Duméril, 1856; Hoplodactylus grayii — Fitzinger, 1861; Naultinus grayii — Buller, 1871

= Northland green gecko =

Species of lizard

The Northland green gecko (Naultinus grayii), also known commonly as Gray's tree gecko is a species of lizard in the family Gekkonidae. The species is found only in the Northland region of New Zealand, north of Whangaroa, and is one of the rarest and most highly sought after lizards.

== Taxonomy ==
Naultinus grayii was originally described by Thomas Bell in 1843.

== Etymology ==
The specific name, grayii, is in honour of British herpetologist John Edward Gray.

== Habitat ==
The preferred natural habitats of N. grayii are freshwater wetlands, shrubland, and forest.

== Description ==
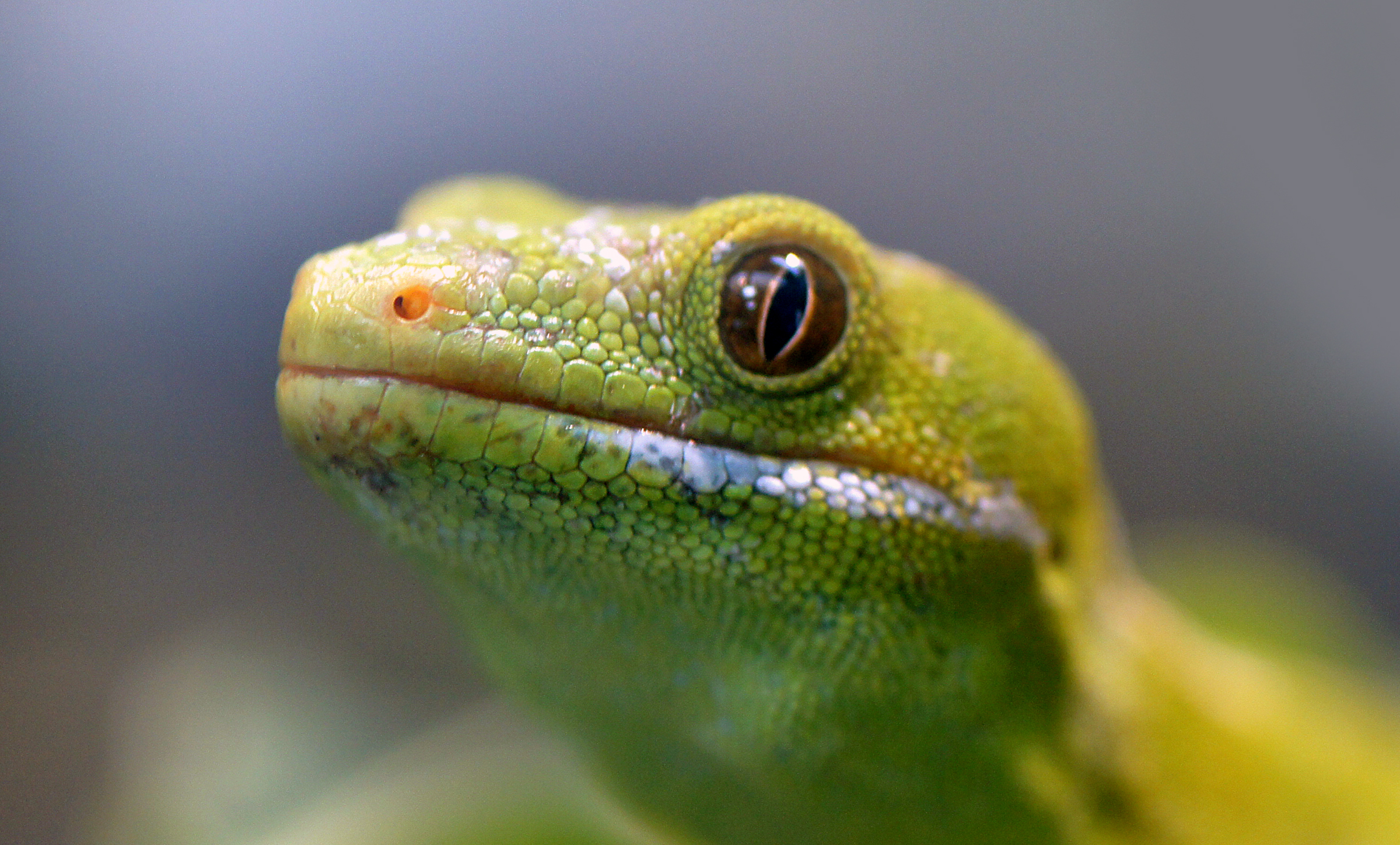
Northland green gecko head

The Northland green gecko is vivid green with grey or gold-coloured markings on either side along the dorsal surface. Males have a blue band along the sides just below the limbs. Underneath, the ventral surface of both sexes is bright pale green, sometimes with a yellow tinge. The inside of the mouth is deep blue with a bright red tongue.

Its total length (including tail) is up to 200 mm (7.9 in), and its snout-to-vent length (SVL) is up to 95 mm (3.7 in).

== Behaviour ==
The Northland green gecko is diurnal, often found sun-basking. It has an arboreal lifestyle, especially favouring stands of mānuka, kānuka, and mingimingi.

== Reproduction ==
N. grayii is oviparous. Average litter size is two newborns. Sexual maturity is reached at approximately two years, after which reproduction occurs annually. The young are born in March, after a gestation period of four months.

== Conservation status ==
In 2012 the Department of Conservation classified the Northland green gecko as "At Risk" under the New Zealand Threat Classification System. It was judged as meeting the criteria for "At Risk" threat status as a result of it having a low to high ongoing or predicted decline. This gecko is also regarded as being "Data Poor".

== Captivity ==
The species N. grayii, like all the Naultinus species, is regarded as the "holy grail" of geckos among their keepers, often going for a large amount of money for a pair of lizards. Outside of its home range, it is most commonly kept in Europe where there are several keepers producing offspring, though still extremely rarely seen.

In 2001 a German tourist was fined $12,000 for attempting to smuggle Northland green geckos out of the country in his underwear.

== See also ==
- Geckos of New Zealand
