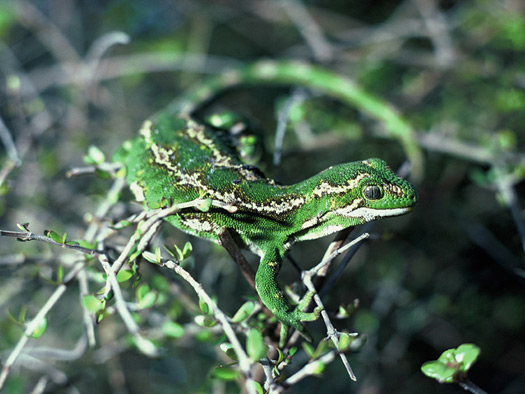
- Jewelled gecko on a branch, Otago Peninsula, by Rod Morris

Conservation status
- Endangered (IUCN 3.1)
- CITES Appendix II

Scientific classification
- Kingdom: Animalia
- Phylum: Chordata
- Class: Reptilia
- Order: Squamata
- Suborder: Gekkota
- Family: Diplodactylidae
- Genus: Naultinus
- Species: N. gemmeus

Binomial name
- Naultinus gemmeus (McCann, 1955)
- Distribution on a map of the South Island Known native range

Synonyms
- Naultinus lineatus Gray, 1869 (nomen oblitum); Naultinus elegans — Lucas & Frost, 1897 (part); Heteropholis gemmeus McCann, 1955; Heteropholis gemmeus — Wermuth, 1965; Naultinus elegans gemmeus — Meads, 1982; Naultinus gemmeus — Thomas, 1982; Naultinus gemmeus — Rösler, 2000; Naultinus gemmeus — Nielsen et al., 2011

= Jewelled gecko =

Species of lizard endemic to New Zealand

The jewelled gecko (Naultinus gemmeus) is a threatened species of lizard in the family Diplodactylidae. This gecko is endemic to the South Island of New Zealand.

Subgroups or populations of the jewelled gecko living in Otago, Canterbury, and Southland can be distinguished by their colour and marking. Male Canterbury jewelled geckos tend to be grey or brown with yellow, purple and white rows of stripes or diamonds. Otago jewelled gecko populations are often green with yellow and white markings, and Southland jewelled geckos are usually solid green.

The jewelled gecko eats a wide variety of insects, such as moths and flies. It also eats berries and, more rarely, nectar.

The jewelled gecko and other New Zealand geckos are highly protected and it is illegal to capture or disturb them. The jewelled gecko is often targeted by wildlife smugglers.

== Description ==
Naultinus gemmeus has a bright to olive green body with either stripes or a pattern of diamonds on its back, a pattern which has given the species its common name, and is an important identifying feature. Colours often seen in the stripes or diamond shapes are white, pale green, or yellow. Those colours are often outlined by black or dark brown. The underbelly is usually a pale greenish yellow or grey and can sometimes have stripes or streaks too. There appear to be some differences in looks between the Otago and Canterbury subgroups of the jewelled gecko, as well as between the males and females. For both the Otago and Canterbury subgroups it seems that the females are more likely to have a jewelled pattern, while the males have stripes or no pattern. For the Otago subgroup the mouth of the jewelled gecko typically has a lining of deep blue colour and a blackish tongue, whilst the Canterbury subgroup have a mouth lining of pinkish colour and a pink or orange tongue. The eye colour ranges from brown to olive colored. The jewelled gecko can get to a total length of 18 cm (7.1 in) with the body usually measuring about 6 to 8 cm (2.4 to 3.1 in) from snout tip to anus (snout-to-vent length, abbreviated SVL). It can also weigh up to 15 grams (.53 oz) and has a very long life span lasting at least 40 years.

== Distribution and habitat ==
The jewelled gecko is native to the South Island of New Zealand. It is found only on the southeast of the South Island. More precisely the main population is found in Canterbury and Otago. Other populations have been found in the area between Canterbury and Otago, but those populations as well as the habitats are small, isolated and fragmented. The species has undergone a decline in population in recent years, and in 2008 was considered "Near Threatened" by the IUCN.

The preferred habitats of the jewelled gecko are diverse woody vegetation, drylands and shrublands. It needs shelter from cold and fires in the landscape, and is therefore dependent on woody forest vegetation. The jewelled gecko is an arboreal, diurnal species, which means it lives in trees and is active during the day. It can live in a wide range of tree and shrub species, like mānuka, beech and tūmatakuru. Rocky outcrops and boulder fields also can be suitable habitat for easy escapes from predators.

== Lifecycle ==
The jewelled gecko is viviparous. Females typically give birth in autumn, usually a little earlier for Canterbury individuals than the Otago ones. Reproduction happens annually, and pregnancy lasts about seven months. The reproductive cycle of the jewelled gecko consists of vitellogenesis, ovulation and pregnancy, with vitellogenesis starting in autumn after birth and ovulation happening during spring. Each female gives birth to one or two juveniles.

The lifespan of Naultinus gemmeus is unknown. It is thought to live for over 30 years when predation and habitat fragmentation are not issues, based on the lifespan of other gecko species in the area. Although most geckos endemic to New Zealand are slow growing and can take 2–8 years to reach maturity, the jewelled gecko takes 4 years to reach maturity. Once reaching maturity it gives birth to one to two young each year, and like other endemic New Zealand geckos, it gives birth to live young and does not lay eggs. Research has shown that there is a clear seasonal pattern of reproductive activity, ovulation starting in the spring and the gestation period lasting around 7 months, ending with the birth of one to two young. It has been recorded in captive environments that the jewelled gecko mating time is some time between September and October, and the birth time is February to May. This species basks in the sun on top of foliage especially on warm sunny mornings and does this year round. It has been shown that pregnant females are the easiest to find, and this is most likely due to needing the sun more to help development of young.

== Diet and foraging ==
The jewelled gecko, like other geckos, has a rich diet of insects and berries that come from its habitat of native forest and shrublands. All New Zealand geckos like the jewelled gecko are omnivores and eat a wide variety of insects such as moths and different types of flies, and they also feed on berries from native plants such as those of the genus Coprosma. New Zealand geckos have also been known to feed on the nectar of flowers when available.

== Predators, parasites and diseases ==
The jewelled gecko faces many threats from farmland grazing, habitat destruction, predators, and illegal poaching. It is protected under the Wildlife Act of 1953, but its habitats are still being destroyed by either fragmentation by roads or invasive species. The predators it faces include humans, rodents, mustelids, cats, birds and possums. The human factor is illegal poaching that is occurring in predator-proof areas and natural areas. Rats are a major predator of the jewelled gecko, climbing the branches of the shrubland and forest and infiltrating its habitat. There is evidence that mustelids and cats are not main predators because they are mainly nocturnal in their hunting behavior. Birds, particularly Australian magpies and kingfishers, are known to feed on the jewelled gecko. As for other pest mammals, such as possums or hedgehogs, these could possibly pose a problem if encountered, but they are not a main threat to the species.

The only known and recorded parasite for the jewelled gecko is the ectoparasite Neotrombicula naultini.

== Conservation status ==
In 2012 the Department of Conservation reclassified the jewelled gecko as "At Risk" under the New Zealand Threat Classification System. It was judged as meeting the criteria for "At Risk" threat status as a result of it having a low to high ongoing or predicted decline. The jewelled gecko has a status of "Endangered" on the IUCN Red List, caused by several threats such as habitat destruction, degrading and fragmenting through grazing, herbicides and burning, as well as introduced predators.

== Cultural significance ==
There is a large cultural significance tied to the jewelled gecko and many more green species of geckos. The Ngāi Tahu people of the South Island of New Zealand refer to these geckos as taonga (an object or natural resource which is highly prized), and they are highly thought of in their culture.

== See also ==
- List of geckos of New Zealand
- Wildlife smuggling in New Zealand
