= Mana Island (New Zealand) =

Island in New Zealand

Māori: Te Mana o Kupe
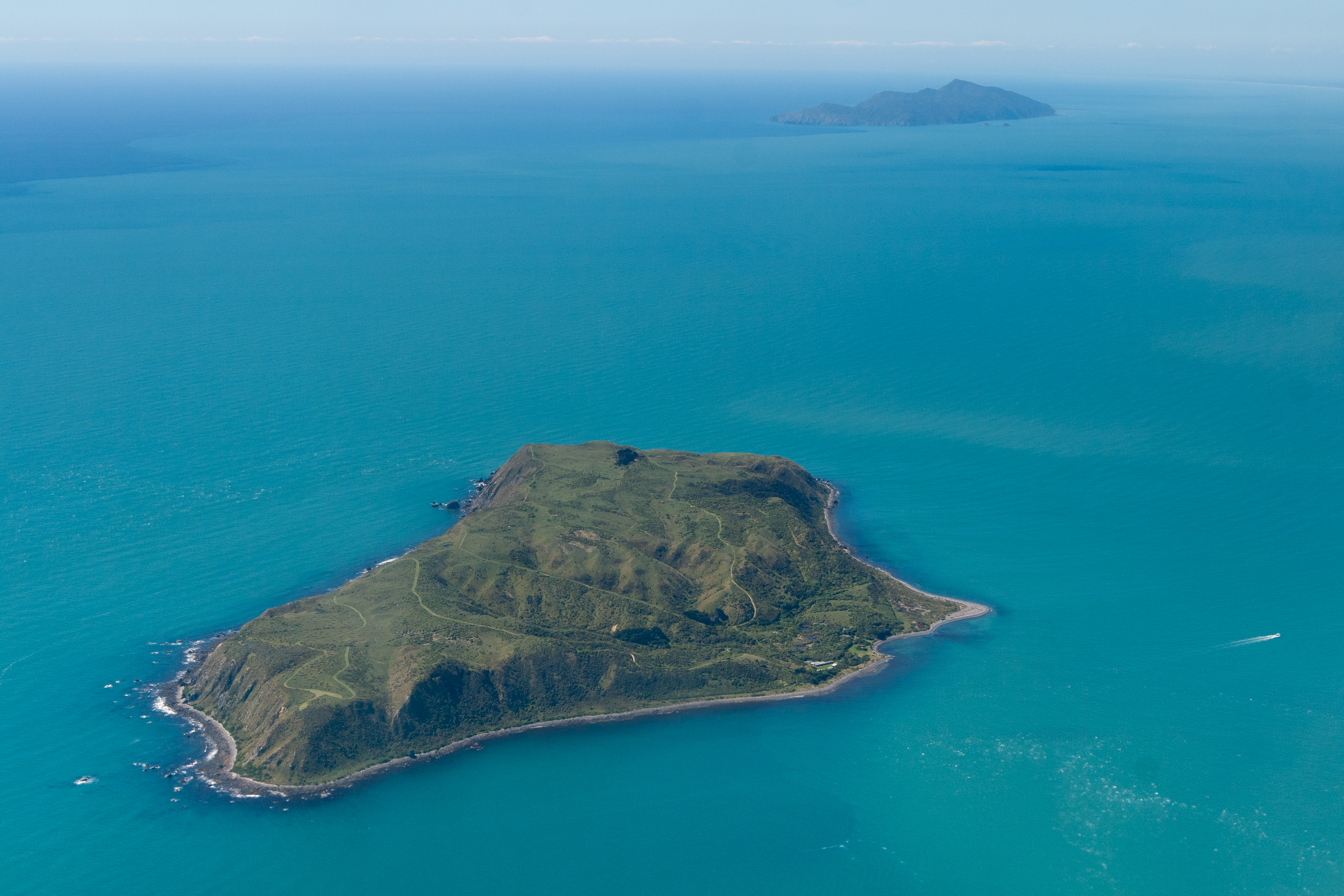

- Location within New Zealand Wellington

Geography
- Coordinates: 41.0876°S 174.7815°E
- Area: 2.17 km^{2} (0.84 sq mi)
- Length: 3 km (1.9 mi)

Administration
- New Zealand

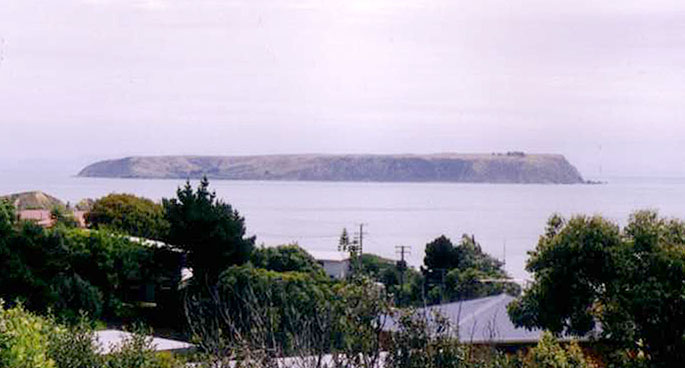
Mana Island seen from Porirua

Mana Island is the smaller of two islands that lie off the southwest coast of the North Island of New Zealand (the larger is Kapiti Island). The name of the Island is an abbreviation of the Māori name Te Mana o Kupe, which means "The Mana of Kupe".

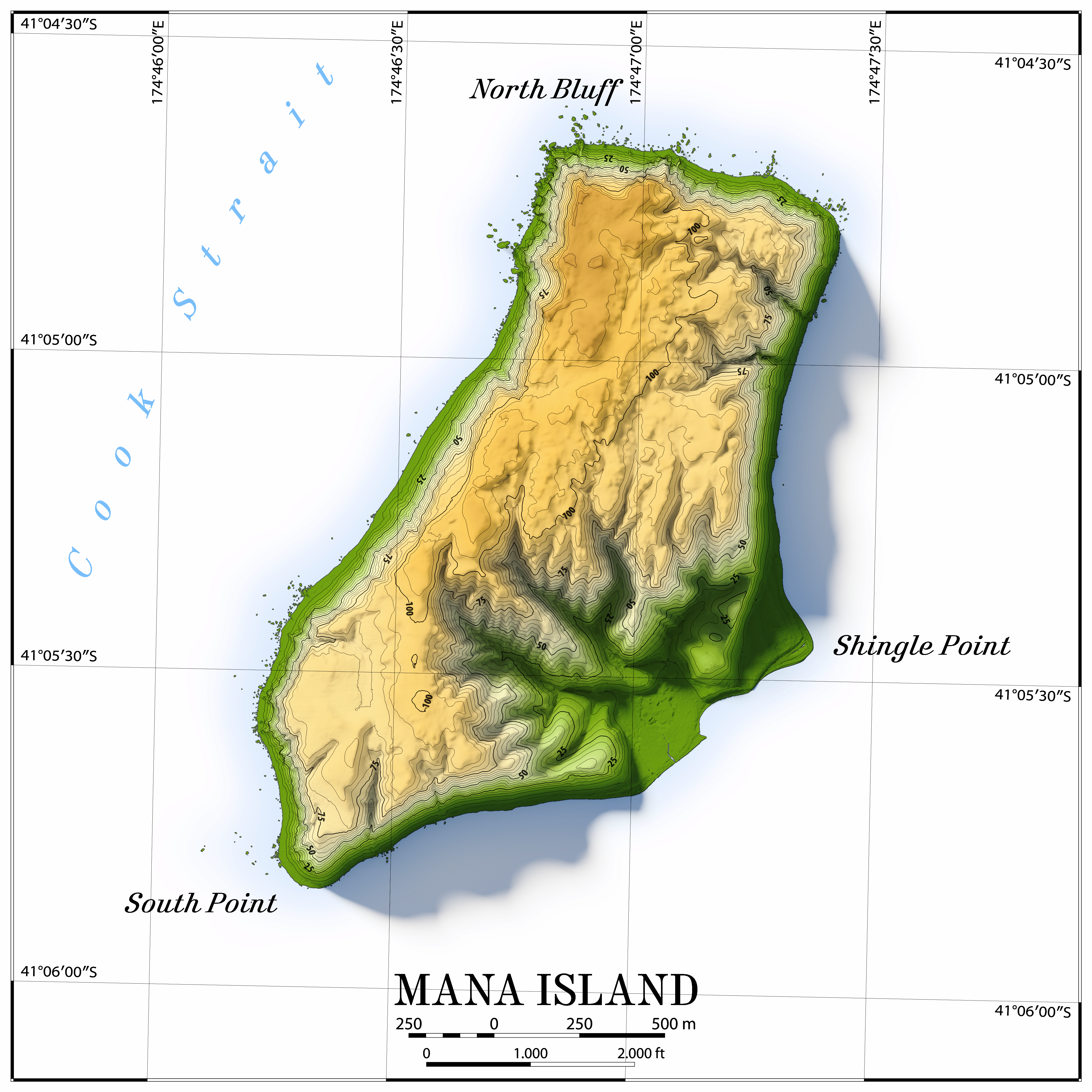
Topographic map of Mana Island

Mana Island is a 3 km (1.9 mi) long, 2.17 km^{2} (0.84 sq mi) table, with cliffs along much of its coast and a plateau occupying much of the interior. It lies 3 km (1.9 mi) off the North Island coast in the Tasman Sea, west of the city of Porirua and south of the entrance to Porirua Harbour. In 2009, it was selected by the Global Restoration Network as one of New Zealand's top 25 sites for ecological restoration. Although a wildlife sanctuary, and thus with no permanent human population, the island is officially defined as a suburb of Porirua City.

== History ==
Mana was settled by Māori from the 14th century. In the early 1820s, the Ngāti Toa iwi, led by Te Rauparaha established bases on Mana.

European occupation began 1830s with a whaling station, and bush was cleared for an early sheep farm. A lighthouse was built to the north in 1863, but shipwrecks were caused due to confusion between this light and Pencarrow light at the entrance to Wellington Harbour, a new lighthouse was constructed on the summit of North Brother Island and the lighthouse was removed to Cape Egmont in Taranaki, where it still stands. It became Crown property in 1865 and was subsequently leased to J. F. E. Wright of Wellington.

=== The Vella family ===
In 1886 Mariano Vella obtained a sublease of Mana from Wright. He knew little of farming, and arranged that Harry Harris of Pauatahanui would teach him sheep husbandry and farming practice. The Vella family lived in Station Road at Paremata, while Mariano sailed to and from the island on most days. At first he devoted his energy to stocking the island's 536 acres (217 ha) with sheep. The Mana Island lighthouse, built in 1864 and discontinued in 1877, had been shifted to Cape Egmont. Mariano Vella bought one remaining keeper's cottage, dismantled it and rebuilt it close to an existing store shed on the eastern side of the island. In 1887 he built a small woolshed that still stands. At shearing time Mary and the children would come across to live at Mana. The life of the family was shattered when Mary died of a heart attack on 22 December 1889 at the age of 20.

Mariano Vella continued with his development of Mana. Wright had found it difficult to farm there profitably, but Vella, with his native skill in handling boats and his newly acquired experience of farming, was able to manage the island farm very effectively. In 1894 he visited Dalmatia and on 3 September that year married Elizabetta Caterina Tarabochia at Lussinpiccolo on the small island of Lussin (Lošinj) in the Adriatic Sea. The couple returned to New Zealand, and for the last part of their voyage travelled from Sydney to Auckland on the Wairarapa. The ship was wrecked on Great Barrier Island on 29 October 1894 with the loss of 121 lives; Mariano and Elizabetta reached the shore but all their possessions were lost.

The head-lease of Mana expired in December 1893 and when a 14-year lease was auctioned in 1894 Mariano Vella was the successful bidder, as he was again in 1908 and in 1922. He and Elizabetta (known in New Zealand as Elizabeth) raised a family of two girls, Mattea and Antonia (Anne), and two boys, Giovanni (Jack) and Mariano junior. Such was Mariano Vella's success as a farmer that in 1909 he was able to retire. He and Elizabetta returned to her home on Lussin, on a visit that lasted six years. Mattea went with them and attended school there and in Gorizia, Italy, before the family came back to New Zealand in 1915. The family then moved to Plimmerton and lived in a large two-storeyed house close to the sea. Andrew and William, the two eldest sons, both farmed Mana for a time but eventually the management and the lease passed to Andrew who held it until his death in 1951. The lease was transferred from the Vella family to John Gault in 1953.

In June 1972 three scientists from the Department of Scientific and Industrial Research visited the island and made an inventory of the fauna and flora on the island.

In 1973 the government purchased the lease from the Gault family in order to allow the Ministry of Agriculture and Fisheries (MAF) to establish a branch of the Ruakura research station on the island. The intention was to use it to undertake research on imported exotic sheep breeds (which could be kept quarantined on the island) with the objective of improving the quality of the country's sheep flock. More than $2 million was invested in the construction of a research laboratory, a new woolshed, hay barns, a mating shed, equipment buildings, accommodation and diesel generators to provide electricity, while two windmills were installed to pump ground up the surface.

By 1976 the sheep population had grown to 2,500 when on 28 September of that year a suspected scrapie (a very contagious and debilitating condition) was detected. An estimated 280 sheep were slaughtered, burnt and buried. After another suspected outbreak of scrapie in 1979 all 2,000 of the sheep on the island were slaughtered and the facility abandoned. For the next five years a strict quarantine was imposed on the island by the Lands and Survey Department, who following the departure of the research staff had sole responsibility for the island. They established a cattle farm on the island in order to use bulls to keep the grass down in order to reduce the fire risk. Restrictions still remained in place as to who and what could both visit and be taken of the island.

Following a land-use study a proposal was made in 1986 by the Lands and Survey Department for the island to be reverted for conservation purposes to bush and forest. This was agreed to and the remaining livestock was removed. In 1987 the island was designated as a scientific reserve and its ownership transferred to the New Zealand Department of Conservation (DOC).

Ownership of the island, and nearby Kapiti Island, reverted to the Ngāti Toa iwi on 31 December 2024 under a Treaty of Waitangi settlement.

== Conservation ==
In 1987 the first takahē were introduced to the island. Following a proposal by the Wellington branch of the Forest & Bird Society a seven month long eradication program (which began in July 1989) removed all mice from the island. Following its completion the first tree planting began, with over 500,000 trees being planted so far by volunteers, with the peak year being 1996 when approximately 30,000 were planted. Subsequently, a wetland on the island was restored and several threatened bird, lizard and plant species translocated to Mana.

Five-minute bird counts made before and after mouse eradication showed an increase in 13 of the island's 22 bird species, particularly amongst insect-eating passerine birds, with whom the mice were presumably competing for food.

A ranger from DOC lives on the island, which has its own native plant nursery, electric generator and boat shed. The DOC staff haul their boat out of the water up a ramp with a winch. Some structures on the island provide habitat for native animals; for example, little penguins roost under the old woolshed.

=== Habitat restoration ===
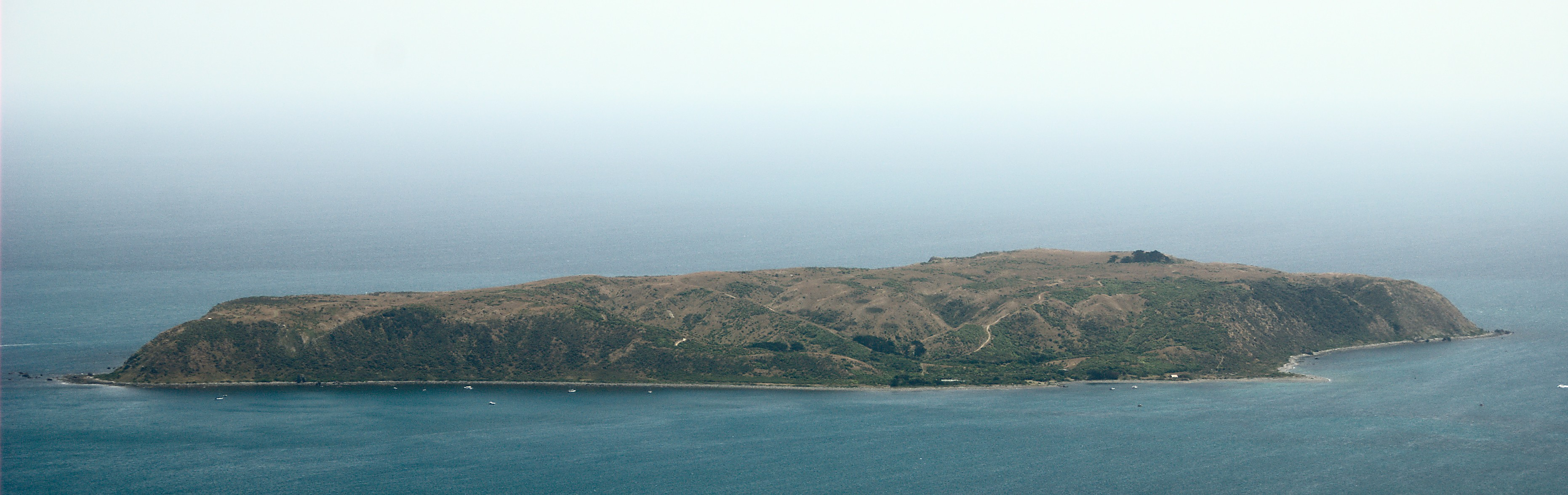
Mana Island in January 2008 – some results of the forest restoration program are visible.

The restoration program has been characterised by a high level of community involvement, led by groups such as the Royal Forest and Bird Protection Society of New Zealand, the Friends of Mana Island, tramping clubs and school children. This effort has resulted in it being selected as one of the top ecological restoration projects in Australasia by the Global Ecological Restoration Network.

Seedlings from a 5 km (3.1 mi) radius of the island are brought to the plant nursery where they are raised until ready for planting out. Although over half a million native plants have been established under a planting programme, two-thirds of island will remain in grass and coastal shrublands. Planting has been mostly in gullies and sheltered parts of the island, which experiences strong winds. The strategy has been to plant native shrubs in connecting corridors. This suits most bird life and allows for natural regeneration. The plantings have been mainly of hardy pioneer species best able to withstand the rigorous conditions. When there has been enough shelter established, the forest area will be inter-planted with a variety of less robust species to establish a typical Wellington coastal forest.

=== Animals ===
The island is a scientific reserve holding many native animals and plants that are rare on the mainland. Notable species on the island include the Cook Strait giant wētā, shore plover, North Island robin, takahē, Wellington green gecko, yellow-crowned parakeet, and brown teal. The most recent example is the critically endangered Wellington speargrass weevil from the Wellington South Coast in 2006.

The Department of Conservation and the Friends group also collaborated on a five-year program to establish the threatened tūturuatu / shore plover on the island. The birds, of which only about 200 remain in the wild, were sourced from a captive population at the Pūkaha / Mount Bruce National Wildlife Centre. A rat exterminated the population in 2011 and another attempt at reintroduction in 2020 failed after attacks by a kārearea/New Zealand falcon.

Mana Island was formerly home to translocated kākāpō. After the kākāpō recovery plan was established in 1995, one of the first actions was to move kākāpō to the island. The last two males found on Stewart Island were moved to the island. Both of the males released onto the island died, suggesting that the island may not be suitable for the kākāpō. However, the birds were also at an extremely light weight when moved to the island, which might have been a factor.

Planned projects include the transfer to the island of a wide range of other species, many of which are rare and endangered. Notable amongst these will be the tuatara, the little spotted kiwi, a subspecies of the carnivorous Powelliphanta snail, and a range of threatened plants endemic to the Wellington Region.

==== Seabirds ====
Recent projects have included the successful translocations to the island of diving-petrels, fairy prions and fluttering shearwater chicks, with the progeny of several transferees later successfully fledging – the first to do so on Mana Island for many centuries. These species are an important part of the restoration of the island because of their nutrient inflows (free fertiliser) and the habitats their burrows provide for reptiles and invertebrates. The seabird translocation techniques perfected on Mana Island are being used with rare and endangered species elsewhere in New Zealand, such as the Chatham Island taiko, Chatham petrel and Hutton's shearwater.

Gannets formerly nested on Mana Island. From 1998, after mice were eliminated, conservationists have attempted to restart a colony, using a false colony of birds made of concrete, and installing sound systems that make gannet sounds, in the hope that real ones will be attracted to nest there. A male gannet, nicknamed Nigel, arrived in 2015 and over the next two years courted one of the concrete decoys. A second male gannet, nicknamed Norman, resided on Mana Island during 2017. In January 2018, three gannets settled on the island. In February 2018, Nigel died. The same combination of techniques is showing good results in a similar project at Young Nick's Head, near Gisborne.

== Geology ==
Mana Island is unusual compared to both Kapiti Island and the nearby mainland, in that it is topped by a plateau rather than rolling hills. The plateau slopes gently to the south-east, with deeply-incised valleys on the eastern half and cliffs on the north and west sides. There is no clear evidence to correlate the plateau with any equivalent feature on the mainland; continuity of features is unlikely owing to the earthquake faults that lie between the island and the mainland. It has been suggested that the plateau is the remains of a marine bench from which all overlying material has long since eroded.

== Climate ==
Climate data for Mana Island (1991–2020 normals, extremes 1987–present)
Month	Jan	Feb	Mar	Apr	May	Jun	Jul	Aug	Sep	Oct	Nov	Dec	Year
Record high °C (°F)	28.6 (83.5)	30.5 (86.9)	26.7 (80.1)	27.0 (80.6)	22.5 (72.5)	18.0 (64.4)	20.5 (68.9)	18.0 (64.4)	21.2 (70.2)	21.9 (71.4)	24.6 (76.3)	28.6 (83.5)	30.5 (86.9)
Mean daily maximum °C (°F)	21.3 (70.3)	21.8 (71.2)	20.4 (68.7)	18.0 (64.4)	15.9 (60.6)	13.7 (56.7)	13.0 (55.4)	13.7 (56.7)	14.8 (58.6)	16.1 (61.0)	17.7 (63.9)	19.8 (67.6)	17.2 (62.9)
Daily mean °C (°F)	17.6 (63.7)	18.0 (64.4)	16.7 (62.1)	14.7 (58.5)	13.0 (55.4)	11.0 (51.8)	10.2 (50.4)	10.6 (51.1)	11.7 (53.1)	12.9 (55.2)	14.3 (57.7)	16.3 (61.3)	13.9 (57.1)
Mean daily minimum °C (°F)	13.8 (56.8)	14.2 (57.6)	13.0 (55.4)	11.3 (52.3)	10.0 (50.0)	8.2 (46.8)	7.4 (45.3)	7.5 (45.5)	8.7 (47.7)	9.7 (49.5)	10.9 (51.6)	12.9 (55.2)	10.6 (51.1)
Record low °C (°F)	6.7 (44.1)	6.2 (43.2)	5.0 (41.0)	0.4 (32.7)	0.5 (32.9)	1.4 (34.5)	0.3 (32.5)	0.0 (32.0)	0.3 (32.5)	1.3 (34.3)	3.4 (38.1)	5.0 (41.0)	0.0 (32.0)
Average rainfall mm (inches)	60.1 (2.37)	64.3 (2.53)	60.3 (2.37)	72.0 (2.83)	78.8 (3.10)	97.5 (3.84)	102.3 (4.03)	94.0 (3.70)	79.7 (3.14)	100.8 (3.97)	62.8 (2.47)	65.9 (2.59)	938.5 (36.94)
Source: NIWA

== Gallery ==
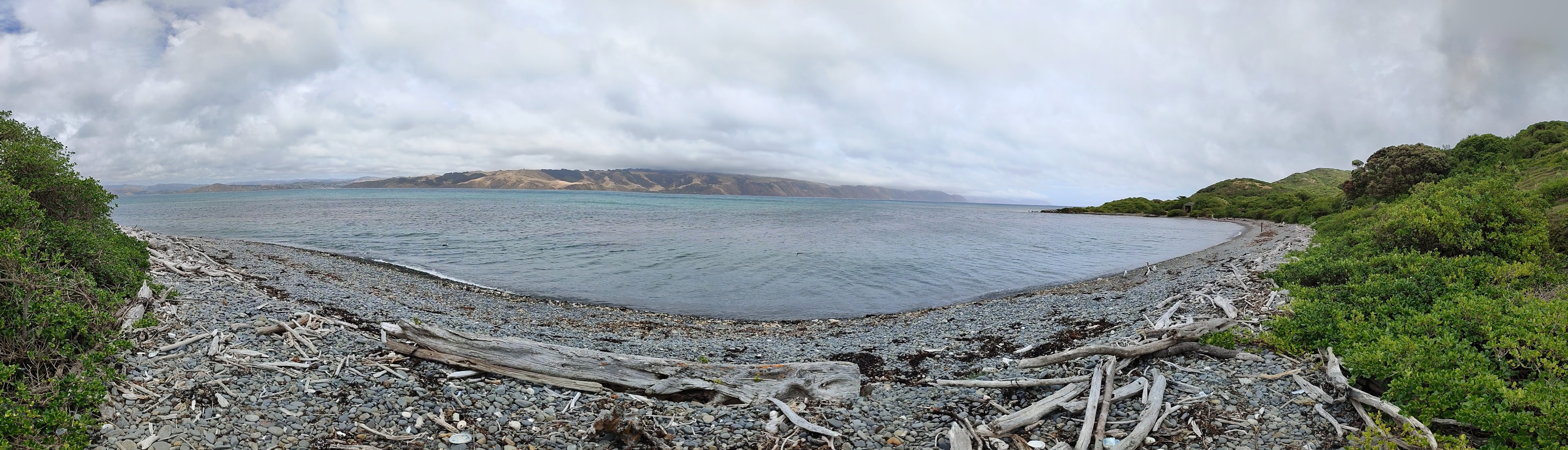
Panorama from Mana Island looking towards Porirua

== See also ==
- List of islands of New Zealand
- List of islands
- Desert island
