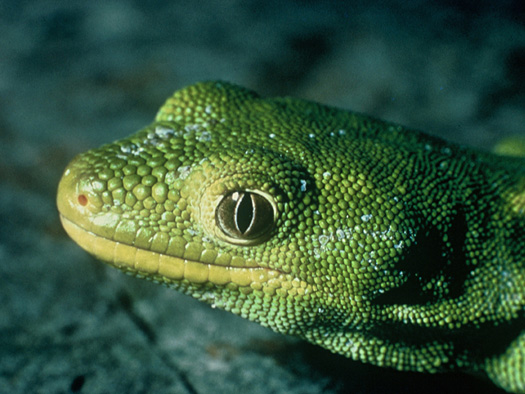

Conservation status
- Nationally Vulnerable (NZ TCS)
- CITES Appendix II

Scientific classification
- Kingdom: Animalia
- Phylum: Chordata
- Class: Reptilia
- Order: Squamata
- Suborder: Gekkota
- Family: Diplodactylidae
- Genus: Naultinus
- Species: N. stellatus

Binomial name
- Naultinus stellatus Hutton, 1872
- Distribution of the Nelson green gecko on a map of the South Island Known native range

= Nelson green gecko =

Starred gecko

Species of lizard

The Nelson green gecko or starred gecko (Naultinus stellatus) is a species of the family Gekkonidae (gecko). The neotype is in the collection of the Museum of New Zealand Te Papa Tongarewa.

== Distribution ==
The Nelson green gecko is found only in the Nelson area of New Zealand, from south of the Bryant Range, westwards of the main divide, to the Murchison district and north Westland.

Reproduction is viviparous. Young (usually twins) are born in the autumn or early winter.

== Conservation status ==
In 2012 the Department of Conservation classified the Nelson green gecko as At Risk under the New Zealand Threat Classification System. It was judged as meeting the criteria for At Risk threat status as a result of it having a low to high ongoing or predicted decline. This gecko is also regarded as being sparse and Data Poor.
