= Matapia Island =

Group of islands in New Zealand

Mātāpia Island
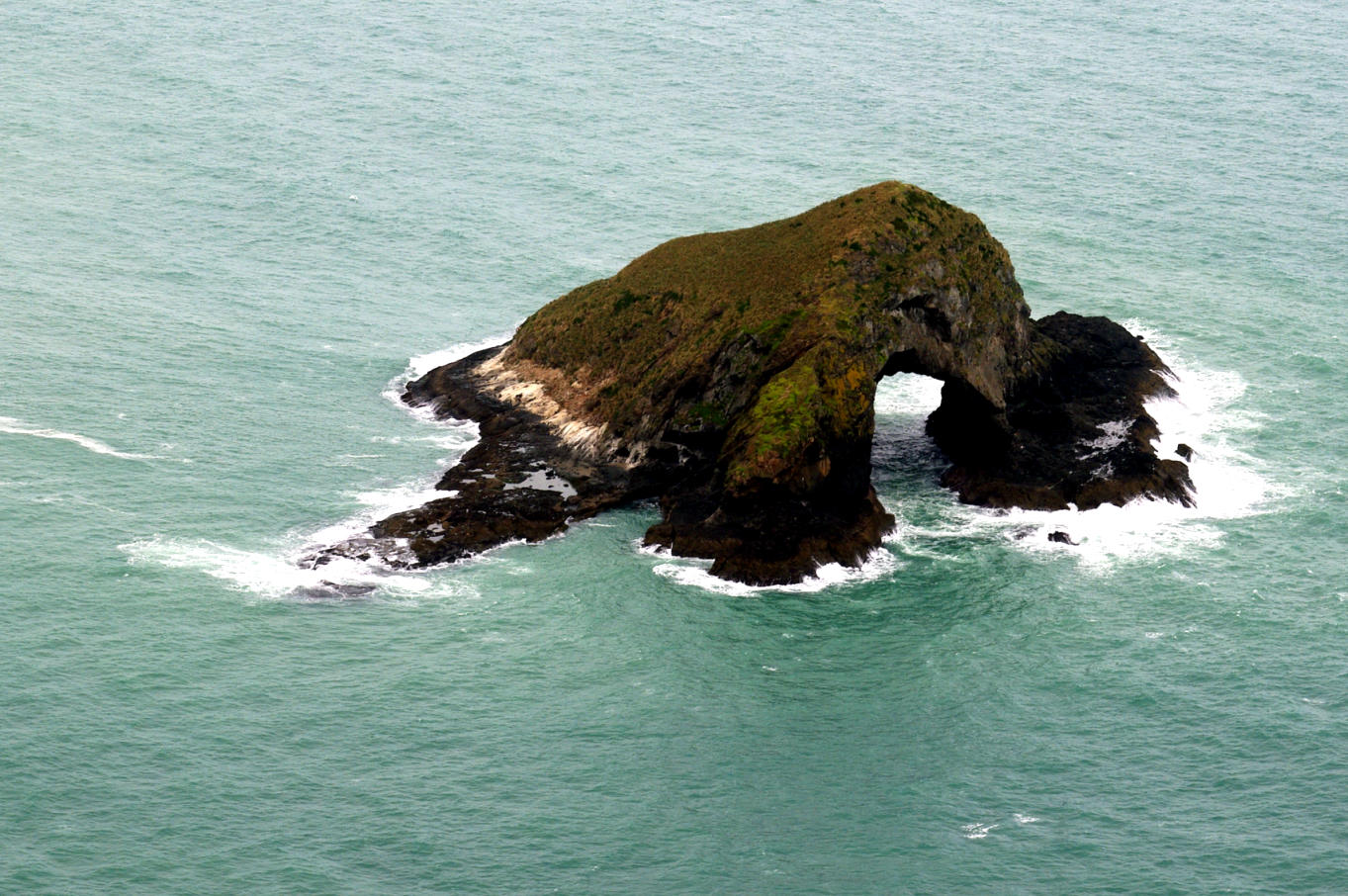
- Mātāpia
- Interactive map of Mātāpia Island

Geography
- Location: Te-Oneroa-a-Tōhē / Ninety Mile Beach
- Coordinates: 34°36′22″S 172°47′55″E
- Area: 2.3 km^{2} (0.89 sq mi)
- Highest elevation: 53 m (174 ft)

Administration
- New Zealand

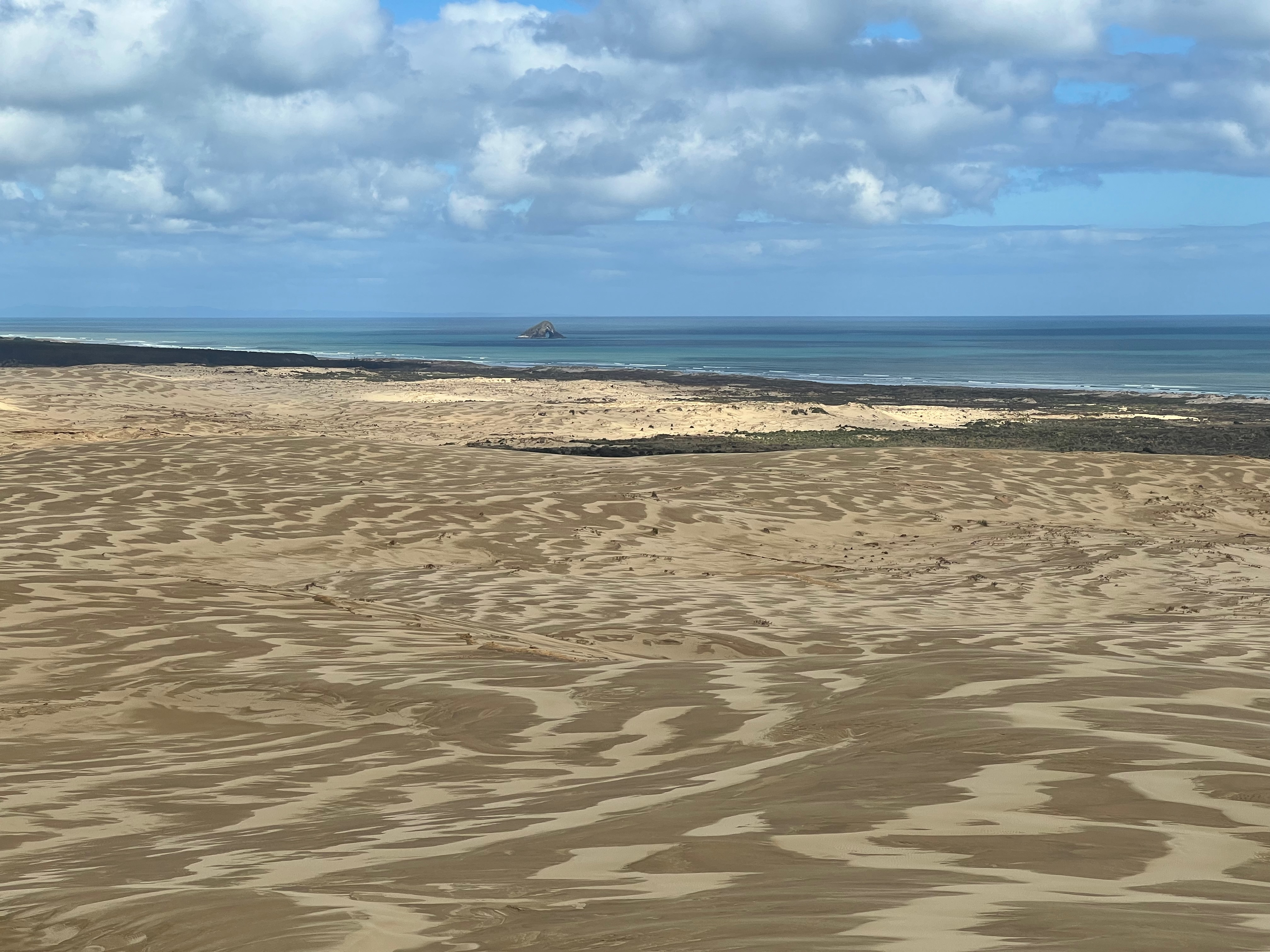
Mātāpia Island from Te Paki sand dunes

Mātāpia Island is the official name of a small island off Te-Oneroa-a-Tōhē / Ninety Mile Beach. The name translates as 'like a face, with a hole in it'. Until 1936 it was known as Motupia. It is 1.5 km (0.93 mi) off the beach and about 10 km (6.2 mi) south of Te Paki Stream mouth.

== Geology ==
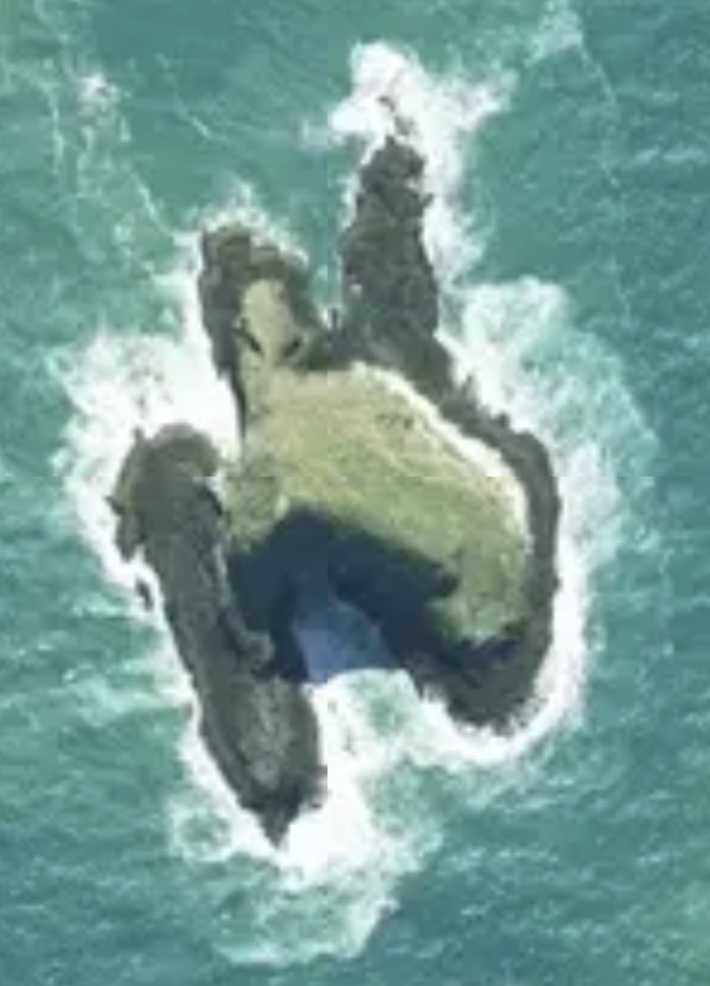
Matapia aerial view

A sea arch is eroded into steeply dipping conglomerate and sandstone of Mātāpia Formation, which is a poor to moderately bedded conglomerate with a pebbly and bouldery sandstone, about 18 million years old, which originated with the Houhora Volcanic Group and other volcanic rocks. A solid rocky platform surrounds the island.

== Wildlife ==
Mātāpia Island is an ecologically significant island. It is one of only two Northland west coast islands (the other being Wakatehāua Island, further down the beach) and has unique terrestrial and marine habitats, including the most fur seals (oioi) in Northland (over 500), which probably also make it an important area for white sharks (mangō ururoa), seals being their main prey. The waters surrounding the island are relatively shallow, about 10-20 m (66 ft) deep, shelving to 50 m (160 ft), 9 km (5.6 mi) offshore. Wave energy is very high and a major influence on the shallow and deeper reef communities and intertidal organisms, together with the north-flowing Westland Current and, occasionally in summer, the south-flowing West Auckland Current. Sea surface temperatures range between 15 and 22 °C (72 °F) and waves average 1.5 – 2.5 m (8 ft 2 in). Hawksbill turtles also reach the island. 35 species of marine mammals are known in Northland waters, also including Bryde's whales, bottlenose dolphins (terehu), orca (kākahi) and common dolphins (popokanua).

Mātāpia Island gecko (Dactylocnemis “Matapia Island”) is the smallest of the Pacific geckos. It also lives on the Aupōuri (golden-brown to dark olive) and Karikari Peninsulas (darker with more variable patterns), but was first identified on Mātāpia. Its sides have a broad brown band above cream ventral surfaces. They are nocturnal, omnivorous and first recognised on Mātāpia. They are similar to Pacific, Poor Knights and Mokohinau geckos. The island also has robust skink, ornate skink, Pacific gecko and shore skink.

Giant umbrella sedge (toetoe upoko-tangata) is in dense swards with occasional taupata and Parietaria debilis seedlings underneath. On steep slopes iceplant (horokaka) and knobby clubrush (wīwī) dominate, with Chenopodium album (wild spinach) in patches above the coastal banks. Glasswort and Mercury Bay weed grow in the splash zone. Cook's scurvy grass (nau) is an endangered species, replanted in the 1980s, which is in patches on coastal banks.

Birds include white-fronted tern (tara), common diving petrel (kuaka), little blue penguin (kororā), pipit (pīhoihoi), swamp harrier (kāhu), paradise duck (pūtangitangi), red-billed gull (tarāpunga) and welcome swallow. A breeding population of black-winged petrels (karetai kapa mangu) is also on the island.

== See also ==
- List of islands of New Zealand
