= Pyrenula largei =

Scientific classification
- Kingdom: Fungi
- Division: Ascomycota
- Class: Eurotiomycetes
- Order: Pyrenulales
- Family: Pyrenulaceae
- Genus: Pyrenula
- Species: P. largei

Binomial name
- Pyrenula largei A.J. Marshall, de Lange, Blanchon & Aptroot

Species of lichen

Pyrenula largei is a species of lichen in the family Pyrenulaceae. It was first described in 2025 by Andrew J. Marshall, Peter de Lange, Dan Blanchon and André Aptroot. The species is endemic to New Zealand, found in both the North Island and the South Island.

== Description ==
The species is corticolous, possessing a crustose thallus with no pseudocyphellae, and is grey-brown to umber in colour. It can be distinguished from other members of Pyrenula by its 10−18-transversely septate ascospores, which measure between 70 μm (0.0028 in) by 10 μm (0.00039 in) and 100 μm (0.0039 in) by 15 μm (0.00059 in), as well as ascomata which measure up to 3 mm (0.12 in) in diameter.

== Taxonomy ==
This species was first described by Andrew J. Marshall, Peter de Lange, Dan Blanchon, and André Aptroot in 2025. P. largei was named after New Zealand botanist Mark F. Large. The holotype is held by the Unitec Institute of Technology herbarium.

== Ecology ==
Pyrenula largei inhabits a range of environments depending on its location. In the Far North District, the lichen grows exclusively on the bark of tānekaha trees in kauri-dominated forests. On Little Barrier Island, however, it has been found in colonies of various Pyrenula species growing on Myrsine within kānuka-dominated forest.

== Distribution ==
The species is endemic to New Zealand, occurring between Te Paki in the Far North District to Secretary Island in Fiordland.
