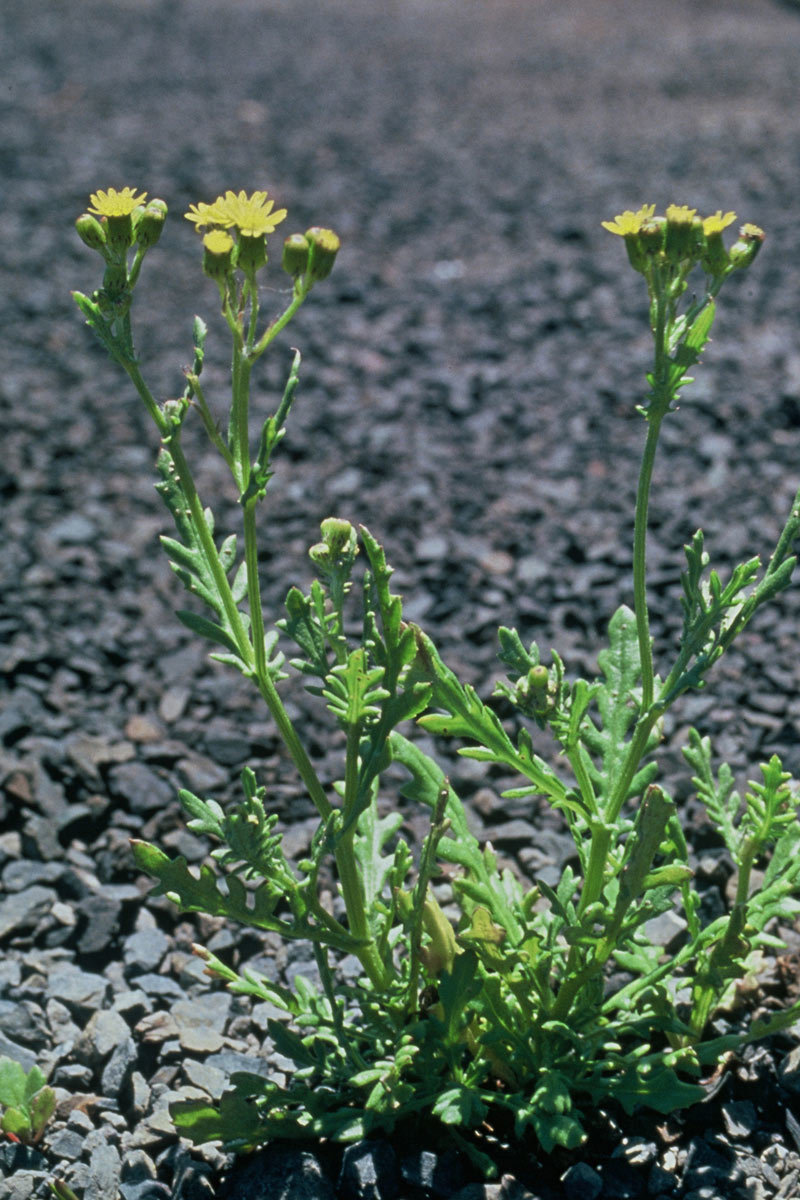
- Senecio pokohinuensis growing wild near the Mokohinau Islands Lighthouse

Conservation status
- Naturally Uncommon (NZ TCS)

Scientific classification
- Kingdom: Plantae
- Clade: Tracheophytes
- Clade: Angiosperms
- Clade: Eudicots
- Clade: Asterids
- Order: Asterales
- Family: Asteraceae
- Genus: Senecio
- Species: S. pokohinuensis

Binomial name
- Senecio pokohinuensis (de Lange & B.G.Murray) de Lange
- Known native range

Synonyms
- Senecio repangae subsp. pokohinuensis; Senecio "Pokohinu"

= Senecio pokohinuensis =

Species of plant

Senecio pokohinuensis, also known as the Mokohinau groundsel, is a species of flowering plant in the family Asteraceae. The plant was first described as a subspecies of Senecio repangae in 1998, and elevated to species status in 2022. It is endemic to the Mokohinau Islands of the Auckland Region, New Zealand.

== Taxonomy ==
Senecio pokohinuensis was first described as a subspecies of Senecio repangae by Peter de Lange and Brian Grant Murray in 1998. The holotype of the species was collected in 1993 by de Lange from Burgess Island in the Mokohinau Islands group, and was found in short grass on a cliffside.

In 2022, de Lange elevated S. pokohinuensis to species level, due to genetic evidence showing that S. repangae and S. pokohinuensis had distinct origins. Both species were hybrids between the Lautusoid and Disciform groups within Senecio, however the hybridisation events were different, and likely involved different species.

== Description ==
S. pokohinuensis is an annual or perennial herb that rises to a height of 0.2–1.2 m (7.9 in – 3 ft 11.2 in). The plant is a dull green, with yellow flowers. The species can be distinguished from Senecio repangae due to differing leaf surfaces, by having shorter capitula bracts, and because the ray florets of S. pokohinuensis are evenly spaced and not recurved. The species epithet comes from the Ngāti Rehua name for Burgess Island, Pokohinu.

== Distribution and habitat ==
The species is endemic to the Mokohinau Islands in the Auckland Region of New Zealand. S. pokohinuensis is one of the few plants endemic to the Auckland Region. The plant is commonly found in association with petrel breeding grounds.

== Gallery ==
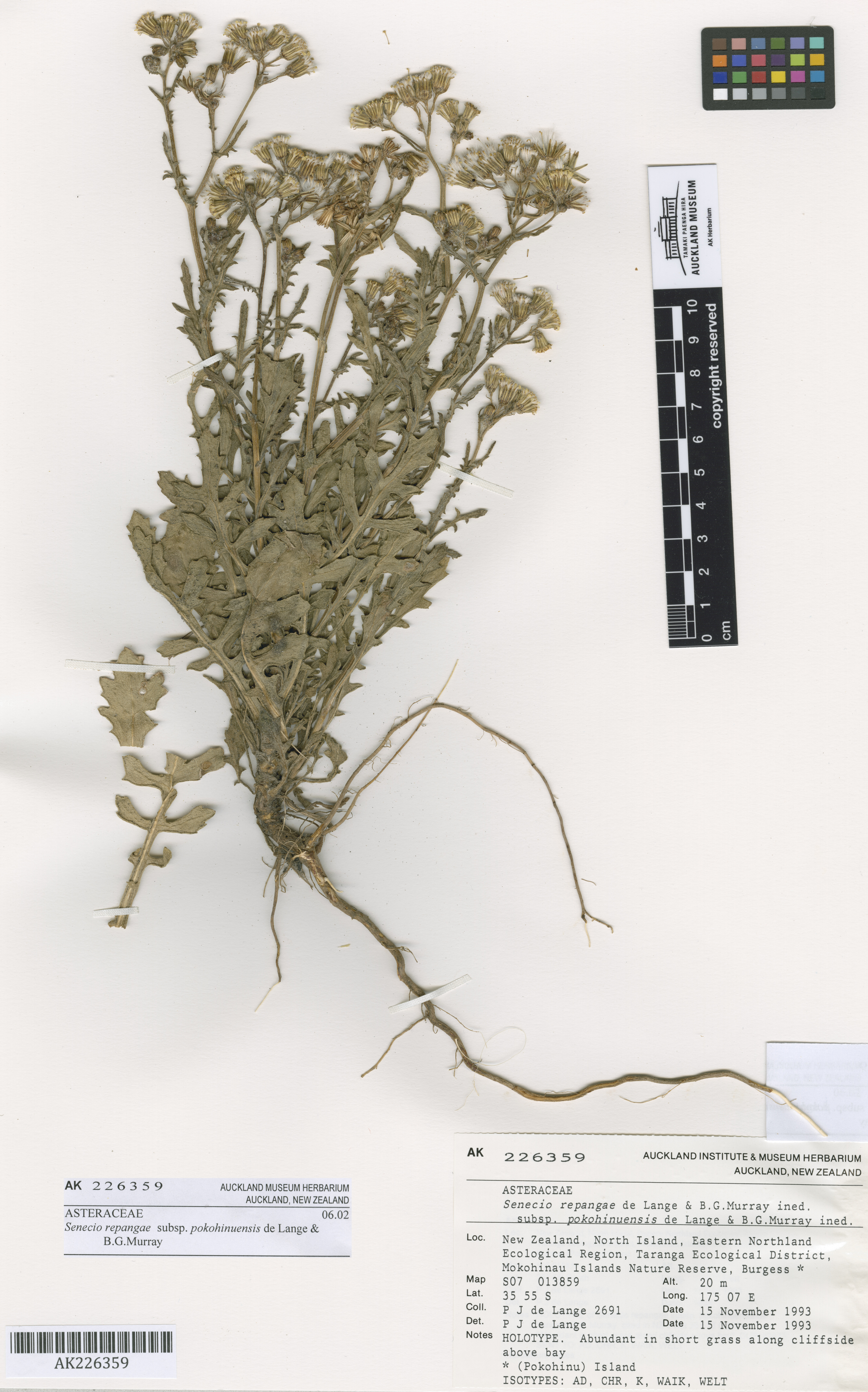
Holotype from the herbarium of the Auckland War Memorial Museum

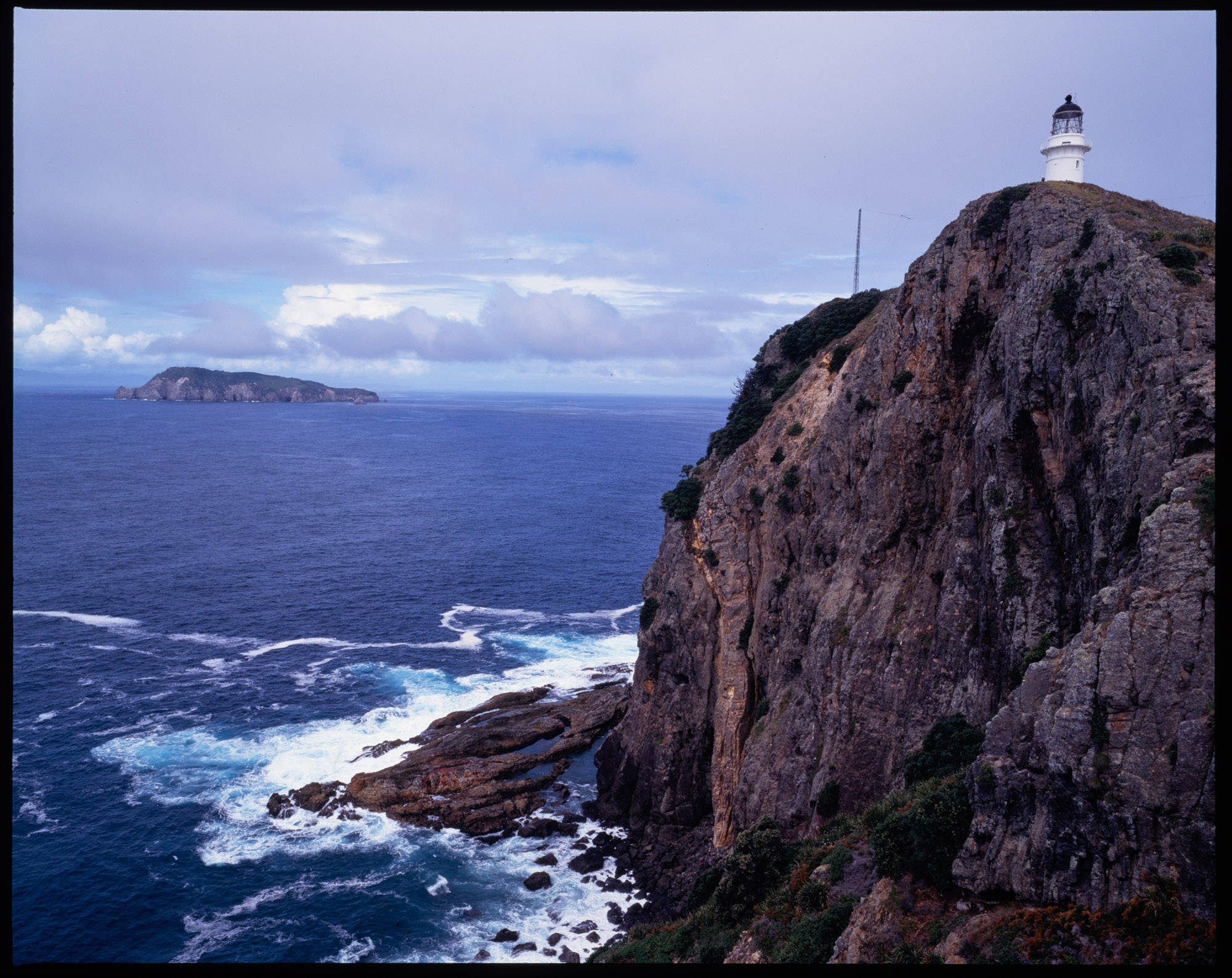
The species is endemic to the Mokohinau Islands
