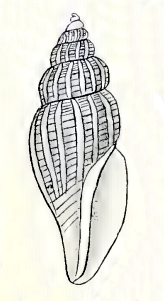
- Original image of a shell of Mangelia subaustralis

Scientific classification
- Kingdom: Animalia
- Phylum: Mollusca
- Class: Gastropoda
- Subclass: Caenogastropoda
- Order: Neogastropoda
- Superfamily: Conoidea
- Family: Mangeliidae
- Genus: Mangelia
- Species: M. subaustralis

Binomial name
- Mangelia subaustralis Suter, H.H., 1899

Synonyms
- Mangilia subaustralis Suter, H.H., 1899

= Mangelia subaustralis =

Species of gastropod

Mangelia subaustralis is a species of sea snail, a marine gastropod mollusk in the family Mangeliidae

== Description ==
The length of the shell attains 11.5 mm, its diameter 4.5 mm.

(Original description) The spire is about of the same height as the aperture. The protoconch has a smooth nucleus, the second whorl is reticulate. Each subsequent whorl contains about 18 axial riblets. The spiral cords are strongly equidistant, and do not pass over the riblets. The suture is submargined

The white shell has a fusiform shape. It is turriculate, distinctly axially costate and with fine spiral threads. The siphonal canal is very narrow. The sculpture consists of close straight rounded and prominent axial ribs, about 18 on the body whorl. The interstices have about the same width as the ribs, which are obsolete on the lower part of the base, flexed and less prominent on the shoulder. The surface is crossed by equidistant spiral riblets, separated by linear grooves, rubbed off on the top of the ribs, much finer and dense on the shoulder. The colour is yellowish-white. The spire is conic, turreted, of the same height as the aperture. The protoconch consists of about 2 whorls. The nucleus is smooth, convex, slightly lateral, the second whorl convex, and minutely reticulated. The 6½ subsequent whorls are distinctly shouldered, flatly rounded below the angle. The base is much narrowed. The suture is impressed and submargined. The aperture is oblique, very narrow, angled above, narrowed and drawn out to a short siphonal canal below. Its base is not notched. The outer lip is thickened by the last rib, angled above, then moderately convex, with a shallow sinus below the suture. The columella is vertical, straight, excavated on meeting the faintly convex parietal wall. The inner lip is narrow and thin.

== Distribution ==
This marine species is endemic to New Zealand and occurs off Ninety Mile Beach, North Island.
