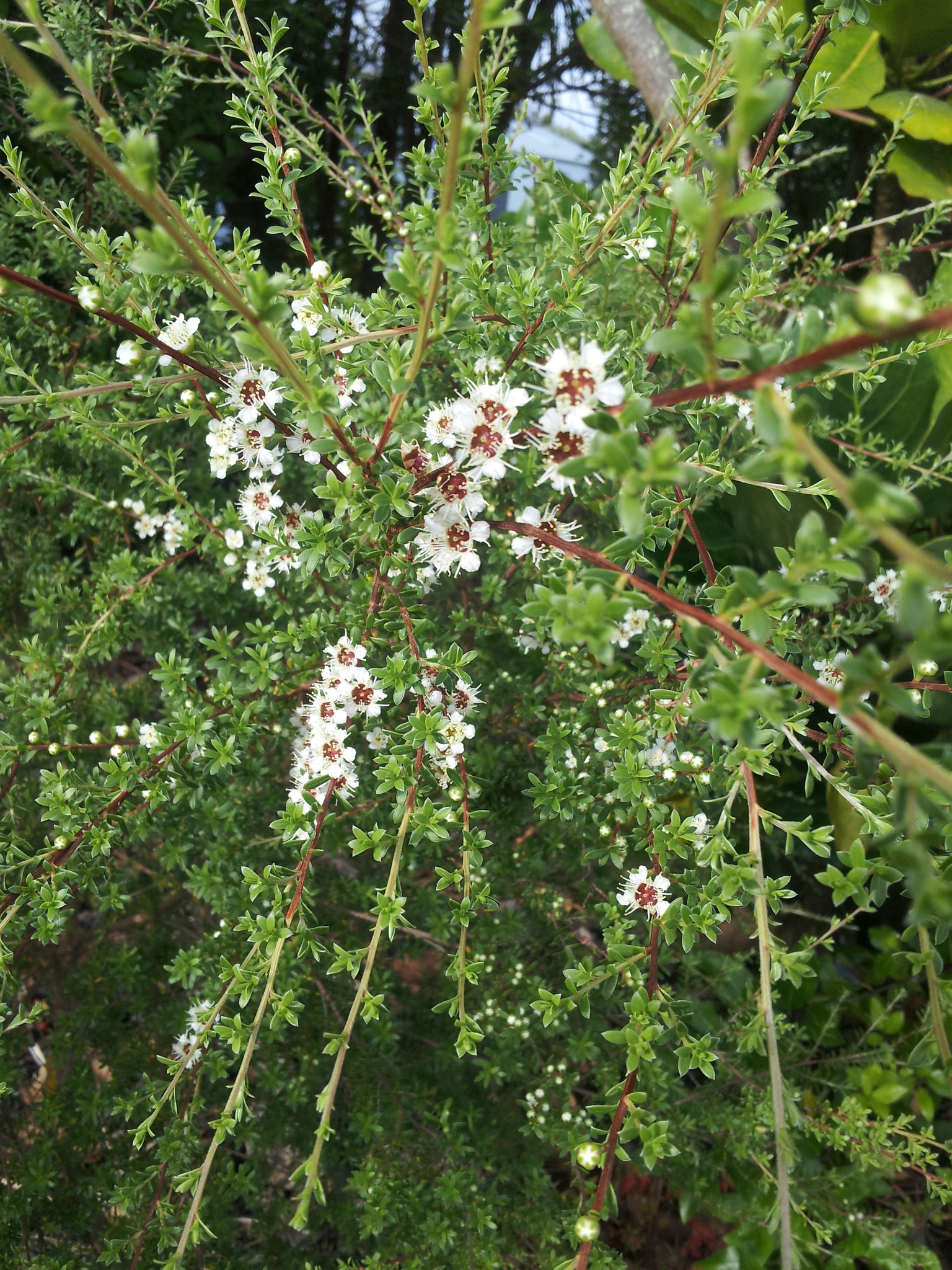
- Kunzea amathicola foliage and flowers

Conservation status
- Near Threatened (IUCN 3.1)

Scientific classification
- Kingdom: Plantae
- Clade: Tracheophytes
- Clade: Angiosperms
- Clade: Eudicots
- Clade: Rosids
- Order: Myrtales
- Family: Myrtaceae
- Genus: Kunzea
- Species: K. amathicola

Binomial name
- Kunzea amathicola de Lange & Toelken

= Kunzea amathicola =

Species of flowering plant

Kunzea amathicola, also known by the Māori names mānuka and rawiritoa, is a flowering plant in the myrtle family, Myrtaceae and is endemic to New Zealand. It is a densely-branched, densely-foliaged large shrub or tree with sprays of large white flowers with a red centre.

== Description ==
Kunzea amathicola is a densely-branched large shrub or tree which grows to a height of up to 15 m (50 ft) but is commonly a dense, rounded shrub 2 m (7 ft) high and 3 m (10 ft) wide with interwoven branches. The branches are densely covered with silky hairs and the leaves are of two forms, juvenile and mature. Adult leaves are oblong, lance-shaped to egg-shaped, 6–12 mm (0.2–0.5 in) long and 2–4 mm (0.08–0.2 in) wide while the juvenile leaves are egg-shaped, 2.5–5 mm (0.1–0.2 in) long and 1–2.5 mm (0.04–0.1 in) wide. The flowers are arranged in groups of between five and twenty flowers and the individual flowers are 7–12.5 mm (0.3–0.5 in) in diameter. The floral cup is 2–4 mm (0.08–0.2 in) long and 3–6 mm (0.1–0.2 in) in diameter. The sepal lobes are 0.5–1.5 mm (0.02–0.06 in) long and 0.5–2 mm (0.02–0.08 in) wide. The petals are white, more or less round to egg-shaped, about 2–4 mm (0.08–0.2 in) long and wide and there are between 38 and 90 white stamens. Flowers are present in most months and the fruit are hemispherical capsules which are 2–5 mm (0.08–0.2 in) long and 3.5–6 mm (0.1–0.2 in) wide.

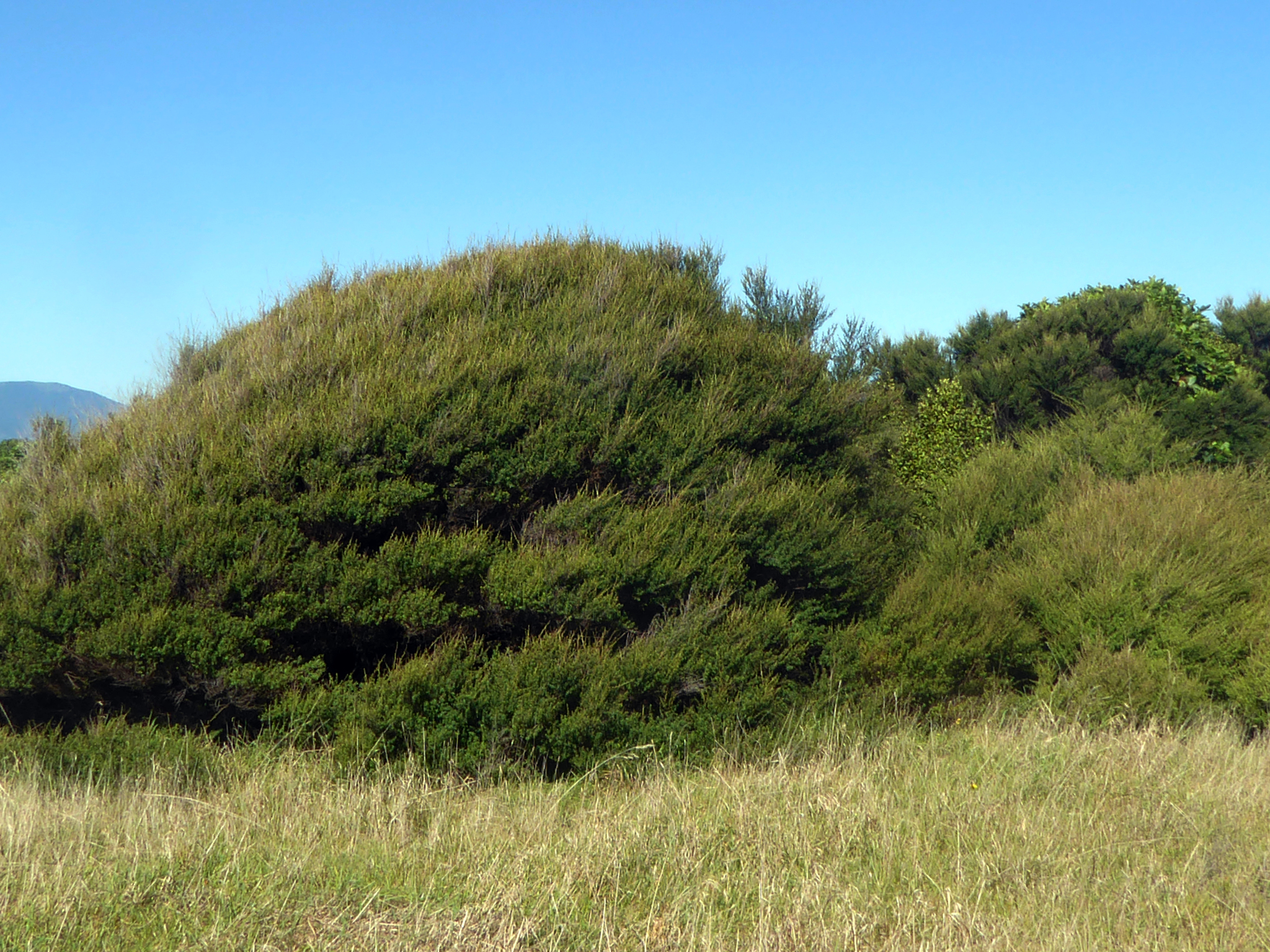
Kunzea amathicola growing in the Kapiti Island Nature Reserve

== Taxonomy and naming ==
Kunzea amathicola was first formally described in 2014 by Peter James de Lange and Hellmut Toelken and the description was published in PhytoKeys. The specific epithet (amathicola) is derived from the Ancient Greek amathos meaning "sand" and the Latin -cola meaning "dweller" referring to the usual habitat of this species.

== Distribution and habitat ==
This Kunzea species usually grows on sand dunes or in sandy soils in coastal and near-coastal areas on both the North and South Islands as well as the Little Barrier Island. In the North Island it is most common on the west coast between Wellington and Te Paki and in the South Island from Farewell Spit to West Whanganui Inlet.

== Use in horticulture ==
Rawiritoa is most easily propagated from fresh seed and is fast-growing is a sunny position in well-drained soil.
