= Burgess Island / Pokohinu =

Island in New Zealand

Burgess Island (Pokohinu)
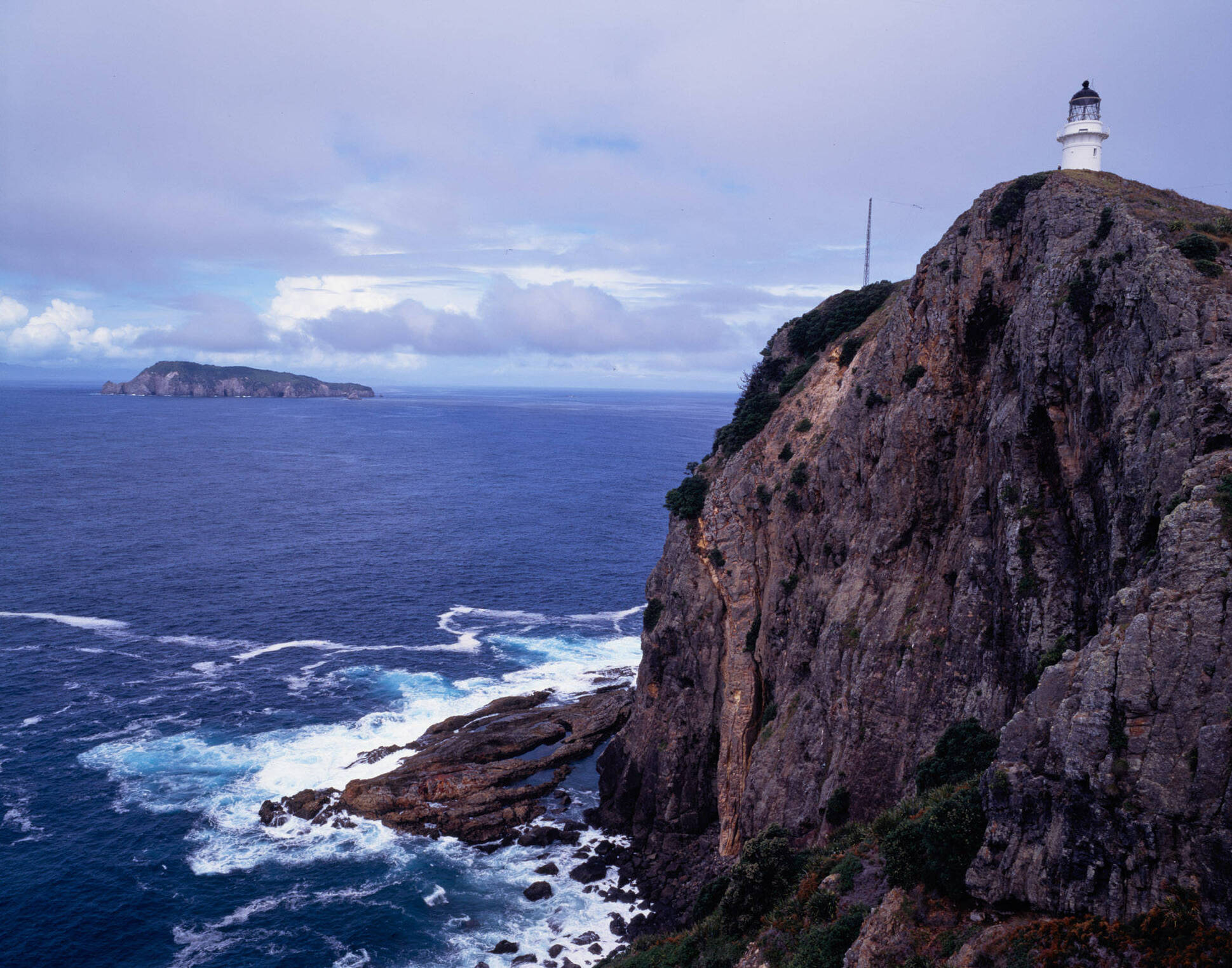
- Interactive map of Burgess Island (Pokohinu)

Geography
- Location: Mokohinau Islands
- Coordinates: 35.90529°S 175.1135°E

Administration
- New Zealand
- Region: Auckland

Demographics
- Population: uninhabited

Burgess Island (Pokohinu) is an island in the Mokohinau Islands, It sits 100 km north-west of Auckland and 25 km northwest from Great Barrier Island, New Zealand. It has a population of red-crowned parakeet, tūī, bellbird, and grey-faced petrel.

Burgess Island is the only island in the Mokohinau Islands you are allowed to land on. There are no public ferry services avaliable to get to the island, Charter Boats sometimes visit though.

A lighthouse was built on the island in 1883. The lighthouse keepers raised stock on the island until the 1970s when the lighthouse become automated. It was one of the last lighthouses to become automated, with the last lighthouse keeper leaving Burgess Island in 1980.

== Climate ==
Climate data for Mokohinau Island Aws (1991–2020 normals, extremes 1972–1980, 1994–present)
Month	Jan	Feb	Mar	Apr	May	Jun	Jul	Aug	Sep	Oct	Nov	Dec	Year
Record high °C (°F)	29.0 (84.2)	29.5 (85.1)	27.8 (82.0)	24.7 (76.5)	22.7 (72.9)	19.5 (67.1)	18.5 (65.3)	19.9 (67.8)	20.1 (68.2)	23.2 (73.8)	23.6 (74.5)	27.8 (82.0)	29.5 (85.1)
Mean maximum °C (°F)	25.1 (77.2)	25.7 (78.3)	24.4 (75.9)	22.7 (72.9)	20.1 (68.2)	18.0 (64.4)	16.9 (62.4)	17.0 (62.6)	18.2 (64.8)	19.6 (67.3)	21.5 (70.7)	23.8 (74.8)	26.3 (79.3)
Mean daily maximum °C (°F)	22.4 (72.3)	23.0 (73.4)	21.8 (71.2)	19.8 (67.6)	17.5 (63.5)	15.6 (60.1)	14.8 (58.6)	14.8 (58.6)	15.7 (60.3)	17.1 (62.8)	18.7 (65.7)	20.7 (69.3)	18.5 (65.3)
Daily mean °C (°F)	20.0 (68.0)	20.6 (69.1)	19.6 (67.3)	17.9 (64.2)	15.9 (60.6)	14.1 (57.4)	13.2 (55.8)	13.1 (55.6)	13.8 (56.8)	15.0 (59.0)	16.4 (61.5)	18.4 (65.1)	16.5 (61.7)
Mean daily minimum °C (°F)	17.5 (63.5)	18.3 (64.9)	17.5 (63.5)	16.1 (61.0)	14.3 (57.7)	12.6 (54.7)	11.7 (53.1)	11.5 (52.7)	12.0 (53.6)	12.9 (55.2)	14.0 (57.2)	16.0 (60.8)	14.5 (58.2)
Mean minimum °C (°F)	14.7 (58.5)	15.5 (59.9)	15.3 (59.5)	12.6 (54.7)	10.6 (51.1)	9.4 (48.9)	8.4 (47.1)	8.2 (46.8)	8.8 (47.8)	10.0 (50.0)	10.9 (51.6)	13.5 (56.3)	7.2 (45.0)
Record low °C (°F)	6.5 (43.7)	12.2 (54.0)	10.8 (51.4)	7.6 (45.7)	3.0 (37.4)	1.8 (35.2)	4.5 (40.1)	2.0 (35.6)	3.2 (37.8)	5.5 (41.9)	8.4 (47.1)	7.4 (45.3)	1.8 (35.2)
Average rainfall mm (inches)	61.2 (2.41)	57.3 (2.26)	84.9 (3.34)	75.4 (2.97)	88.8 (3.50)	101.4 (3.99)	123.8 (4.87)	93.7 (3.69)	62.6 (2.46)	56.0 (2.20)	46.0 (1.81)	69.3 (2.73)	920.4 (36.23)
Source: NIWA

== See also ==
- List of islands of New Zealand
