= Atihau Island =

Island in New Zealand

- Interactive map of Atihau Island

Geography
- Coordinates: 35.912339°S 175.098442°E

Administration
- New Zealand
- Region: Auckland

Demographics
- Population: uninhabited

Atihau Island is an island which lays on the west of the Mokohinau Islands in New Zealand.

== See also ==
- List of islands of New Zealand
