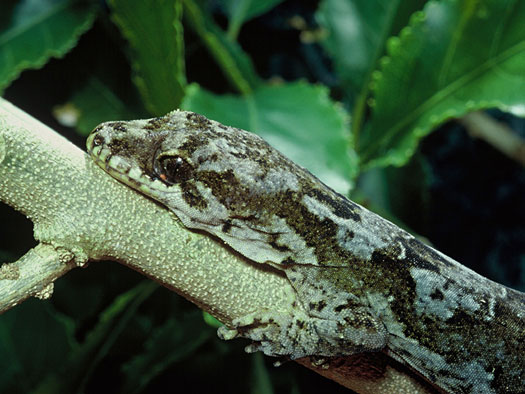
- Close up of head and upper body

Conservation status
- CITES Appendix III

Scientific classification
- Kingdom: Animalia
- Phylum: Chordata
- Order: Squamata
- Suborder: Gekkota
- Family: Diplodactylidae
- Genus: Dactylocnemis; Steindachner, 1867
- Species: D. pacificus

Binomial name
- Dactylocnemis pacificus (Gray, 1842)
- Distribution of the Pacific gecko on a map of the North Island Known native range

Synonyms
- Hoplodactylus pacificus

= Dactylocnemis =

Genus of lizards

Dactylocnemis pacificus, the Pacific gecko or Pacific sticky-toed gecko, is a species in the family Gekkonidae, endemic to the North Island and offshore islands of New Zealand. D. pacificus is the only described species in the genus Dactylocnemis, but five offshore island forms may represent new species, one of which is the Mokohinau gecko.

== Taxonomy ==
The Pacific gecko was first described by John Edward Gray in 1842 as Naultinus pacificus. By 1851 the species had been recombined as Platydactylus pacificus, Dactylocnemis pacificus in 1867, and Hoplodactylus pacificus in 1995. In 2011 after phylogenetic analysis, the species was placed back into the genus Dactylocnemis.

The genus Dactylocnemis was described by Franz Steindachner in 1867, who named the Pacific gecko the type species. The genus was later synonymised with Hoplodactylus, but brought out of synonymy in 2011.

While currently only Dactylocnemis pacificus has been formally described, there are currently five undescribed populations of Dactylocnemis lizards which may either be species or subspecies of Dactylocnemis pacificus. These include the Matapia Island geckos, North Cape geckos, the Mokohinau gecko on the Mokohinau Islands, the Poor Knights Islands geckos, and the Manawatāwhi / Three Kings Islands geckos.

Poor Knights Islands geckos

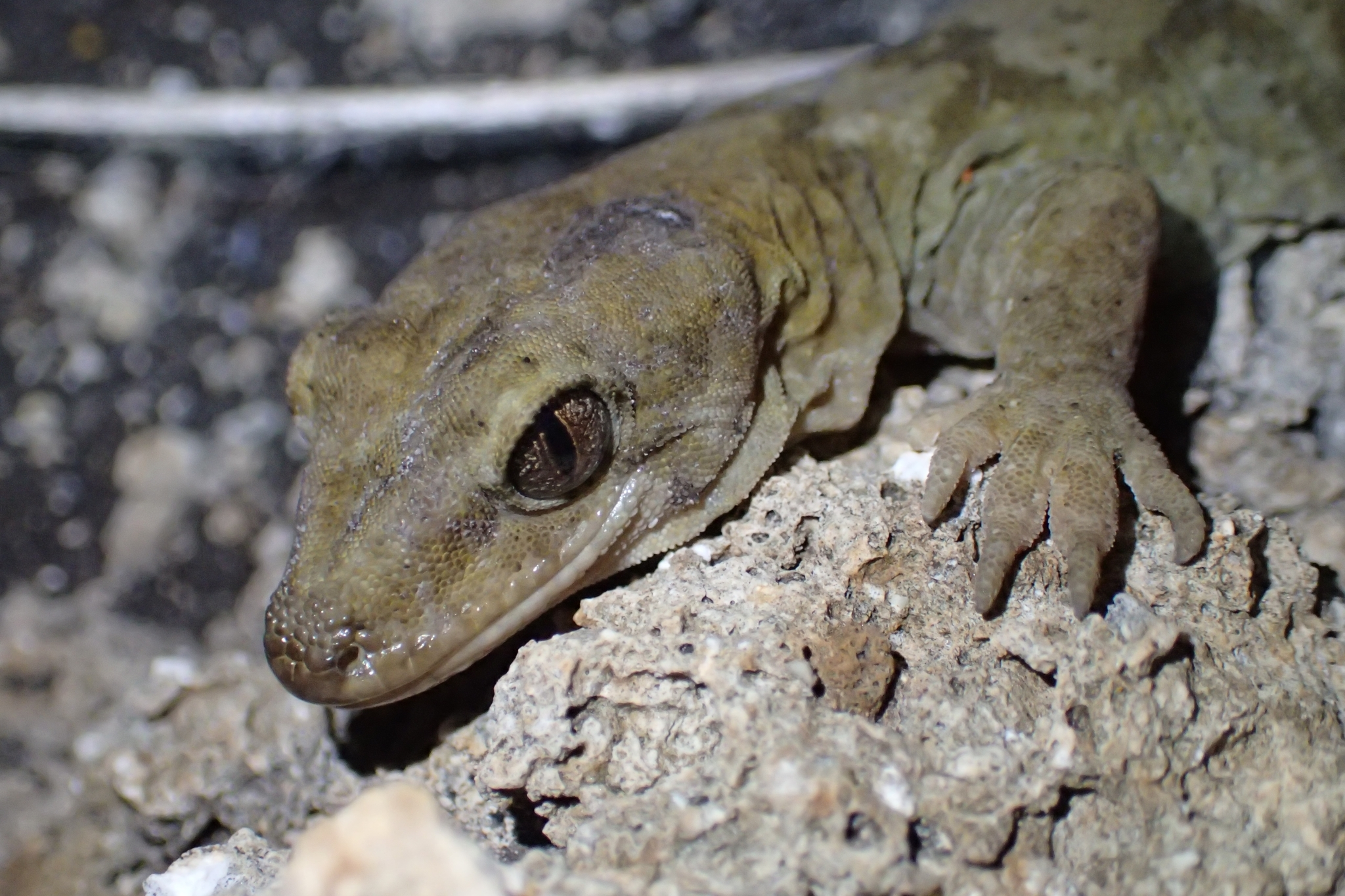

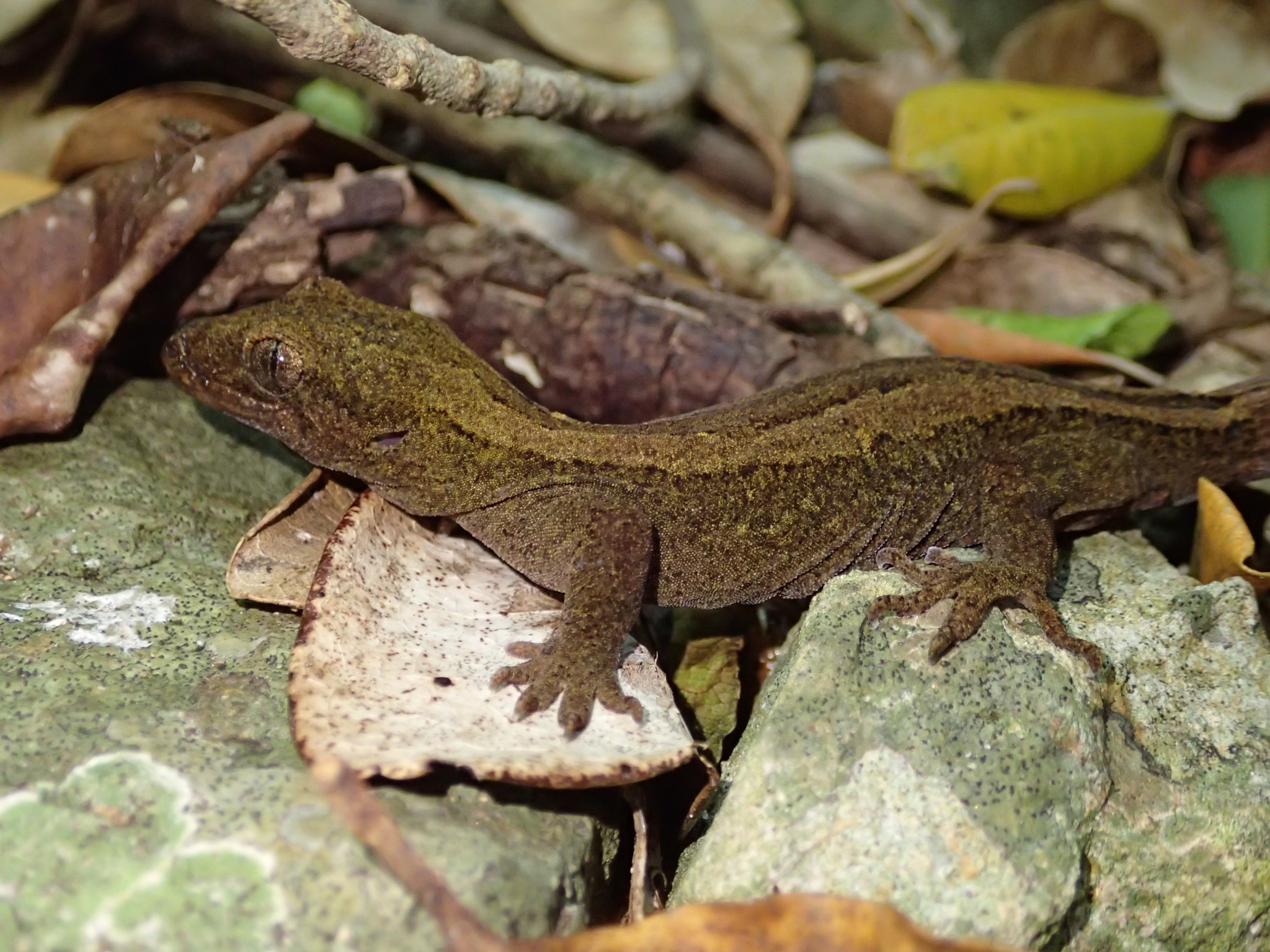

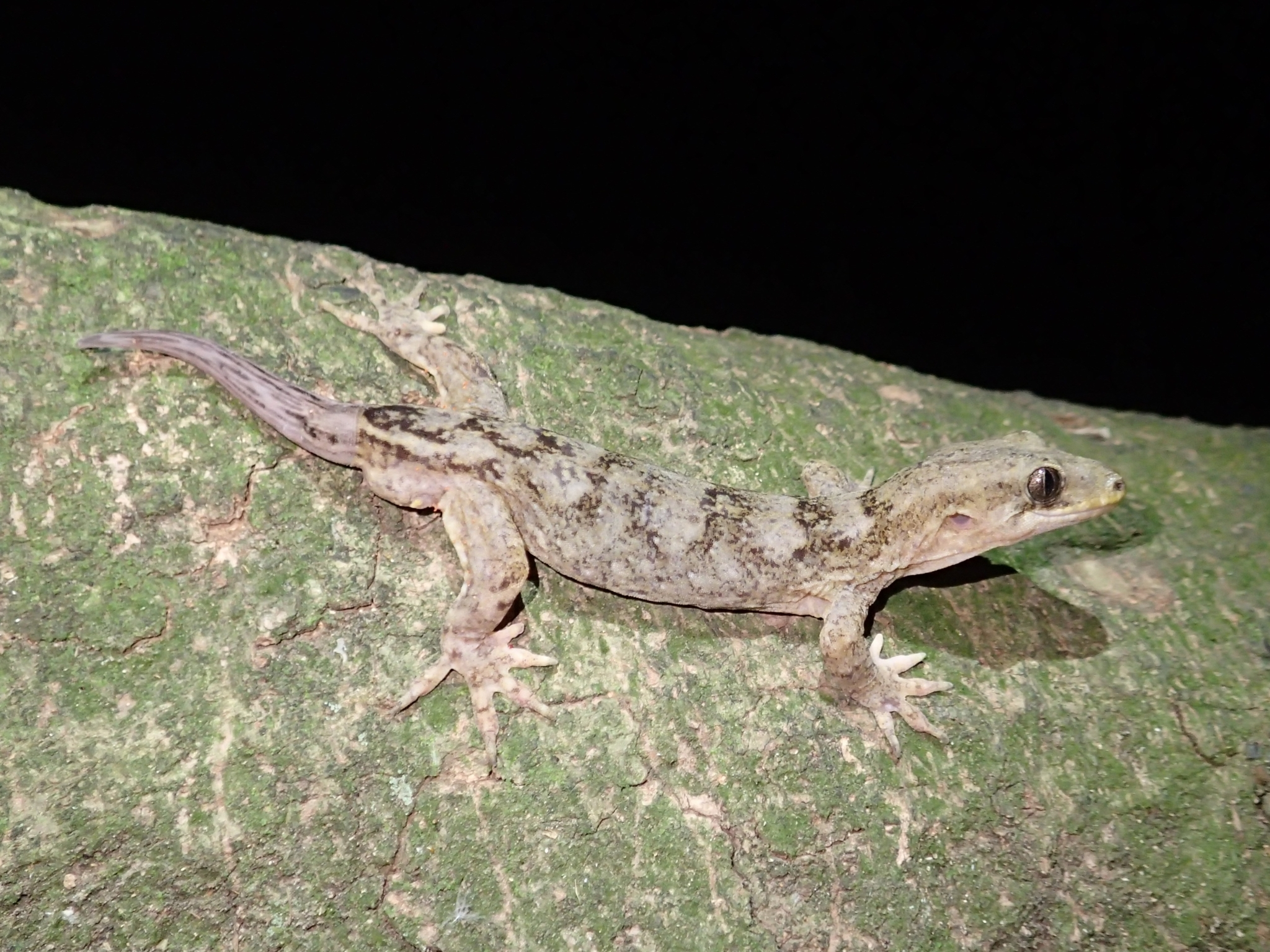

== Description ==
The species can grow up to 80 mm (3.1 in) in length. It has a variable body colour, typically a mottled pattern of brown, greyish brown or olive green. The underside of the Pacific gecko is pale grey in colour, and occasionally speckled with black. The species can be differentiated from the Raukawa gecko and the gold-striped gecko due to the Pacific gecko's rostral scale being in contact with nostrils.

== Behaviour ==
The species is nocturnal, hiding beneath loose bark or within trees in the daytime, or on occasion sun-basking. The species forages on trees and within foliage at night time, and has an omnivorous diet, feeling on fruits, nectar and invertebrates.

Pacific geckos mate between Match and May, and give birth to one or two young between February and March. Young geckos take between three and four years to become sexually mature.

== Distribution and habitat ==
The species is found on the North Island, from Whanganui north to the Bay of Islands. The species is found in a range of coastal and lowland habitats, including beaches, scrubland and forest.

== Gallery ==
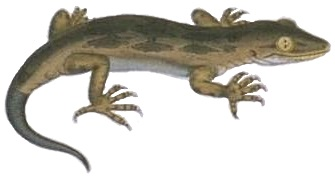
Illustration by Charles Frédéric Girard in 1858 from the United States Exploring Expedition Herpetology Atlas

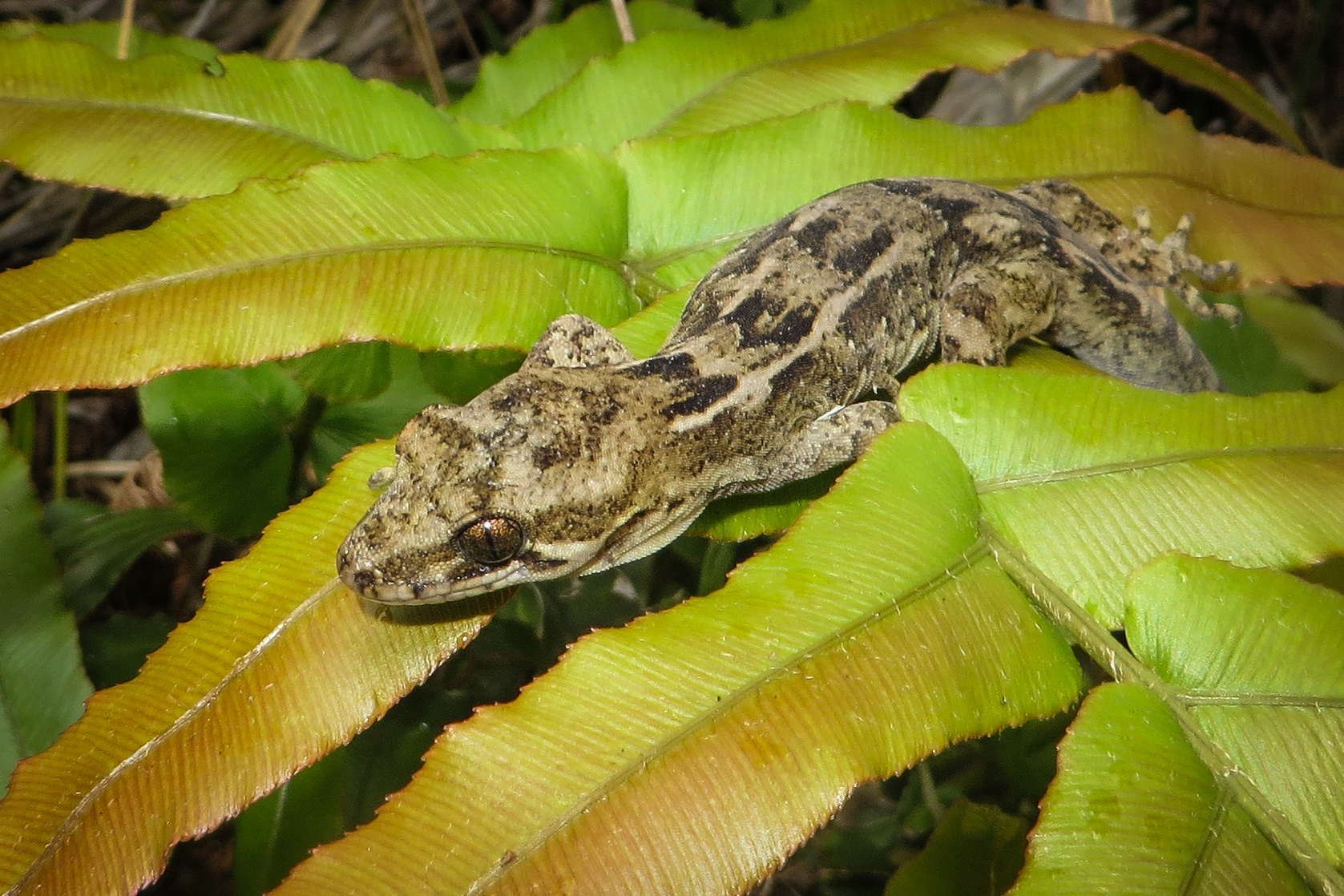
D. pacificus seen in the central Waikato Region

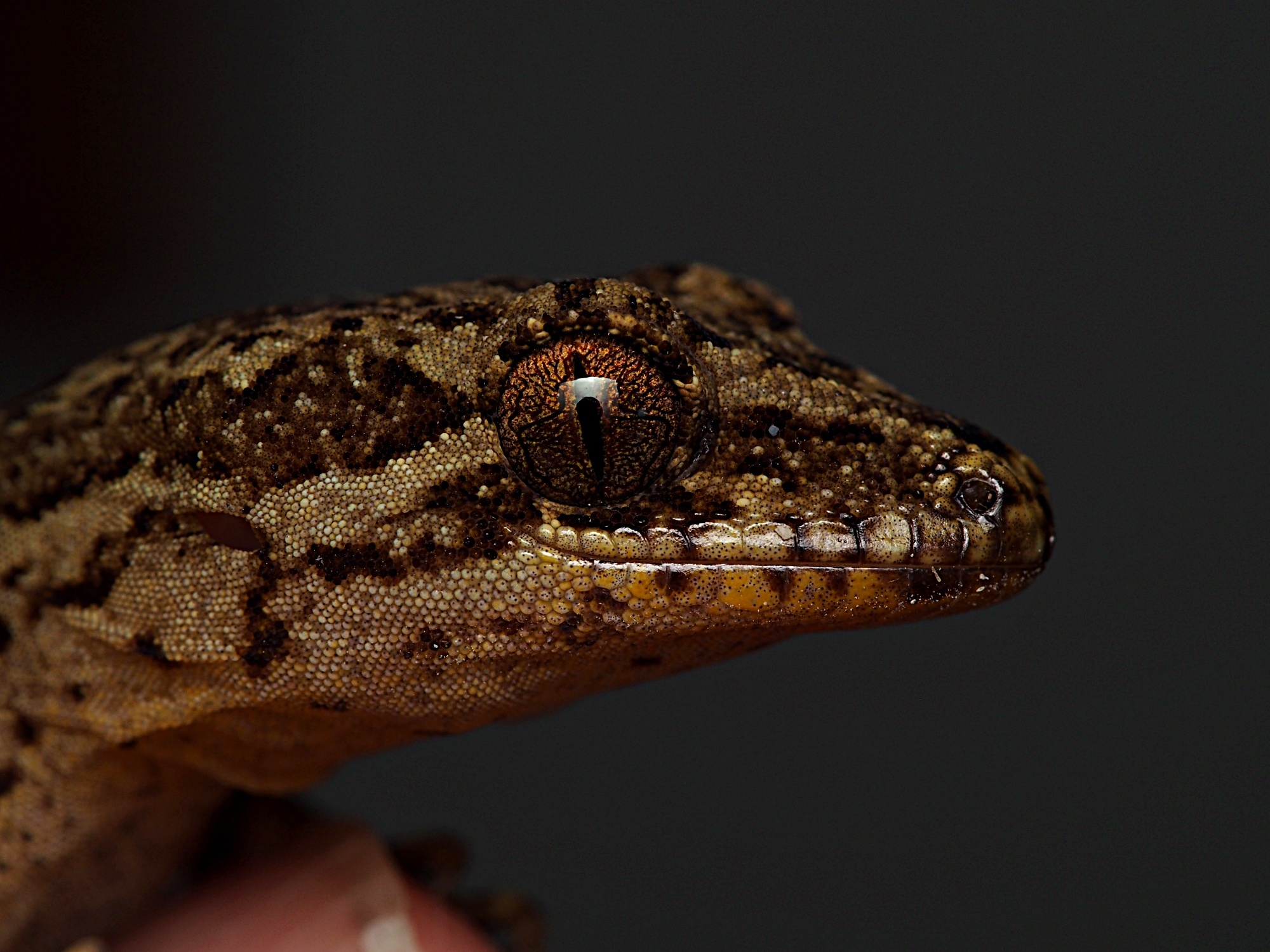
Close-up of face of D. pacificus, seen near the Bay of Islands
