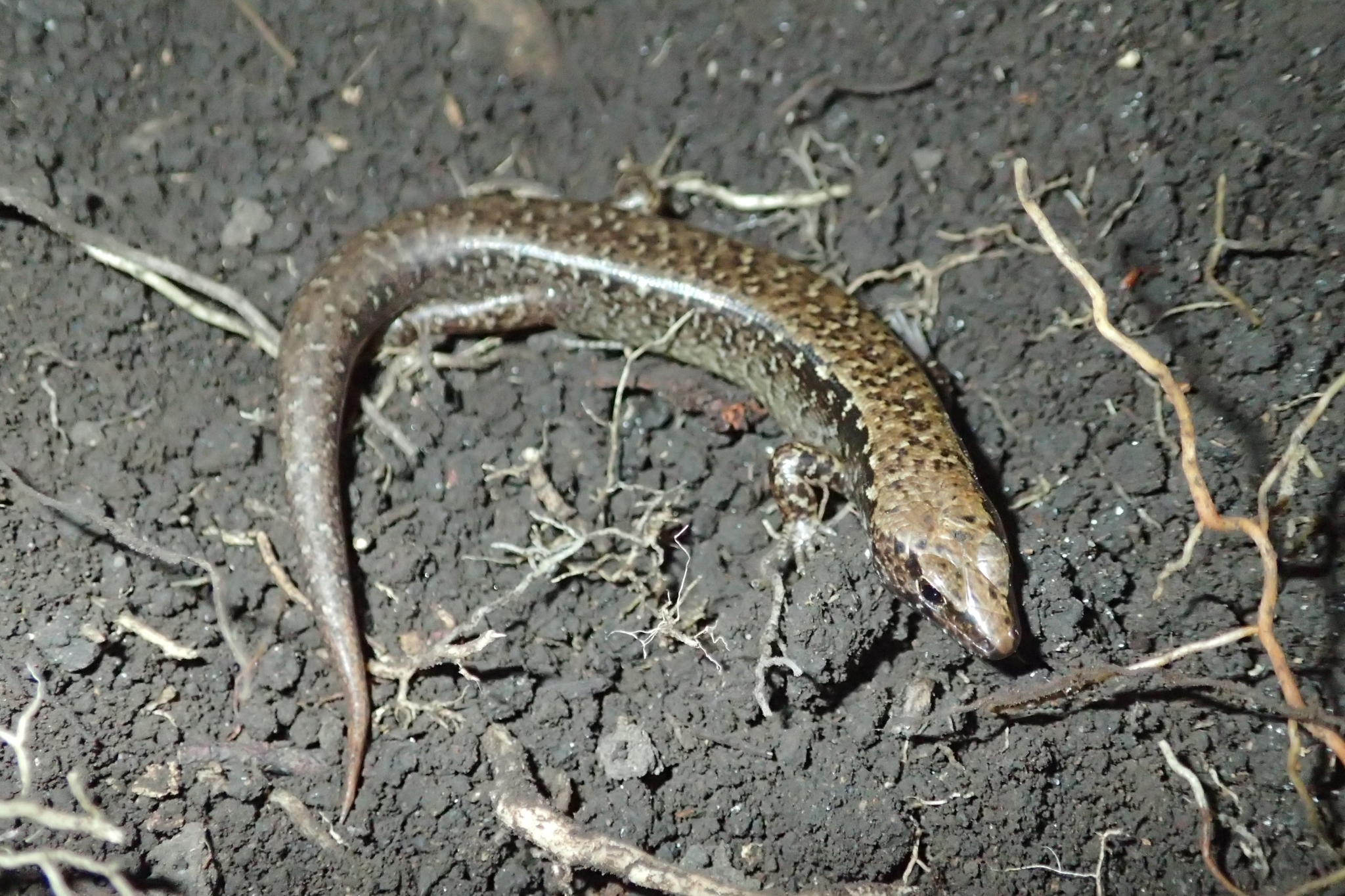

Scientific classification
- Kingdom: Animalia
- Phylum: Chordata
- Class: Reptilia
- Order: Squamata
- Family: Scincidae
- Genus: Oligosoma
- Species: O. townsi

Binomial name
- Oligosoma townsi (Chapple et al., 2008)
- Distribution of the Mokohinau skink on the North Island map Known native range

Synonyms
- Cyclodina townsi Chapple et al., 2008

= Mokohinau skink =

Species of lizard

The Mokohinau skink (Oligosoma townsi), also known commonly as Towns' skink and the Hauraki skink, is a species of lizard in the family Scincidae. The species is endemic to New Zealand.

== Taxonomy and etymology ==
The species was first described as Cyclodina townsi by David G. Chapple, Geoff B. Patterson, Dianne M. Gleeson and Charles H. Daugherty in 2008, who identified the species as being phylogenetically and morphologicaly distinct from the marbled skink. It was placed in its modern genus, Oligosoma, in 2009. The specific name, townsi, is in honor of Kiwi herpetologist David Towns.

== Description ==
O. townsi reaches a maximum snout-vent length of up to 95 mm (3.7 in). It can be distinguished from other species due to the black-edged teardrop and alternating balack and white patterning on the species' lower jaw.

== Geographic range ==
In New Zealand O. townsi is found on offshore island in the eastern Northland Region and Auckland Region including Three Kings Islands, the Poor Knights Islands, Hen and Chicken Islands, Great Barrier Island, Little Barrier Island and the Mokohinau Islands.

== Habitat ==
O. townsi occupies broadleaf forest and low scrub, usually found on boulder beaches covered in vines, leaf litter and scree.

== Reproduction and behaviour ==
O. townsi is viviparous and is believed to be nocturnal. The species primarily eats insects, and will occasionally consume fruit.
