= Scott Point (Northland) =

Geographic feature in Northland Region, New Zealand

Scott Point Tiriparepa / Scott Point
- Coastal Point
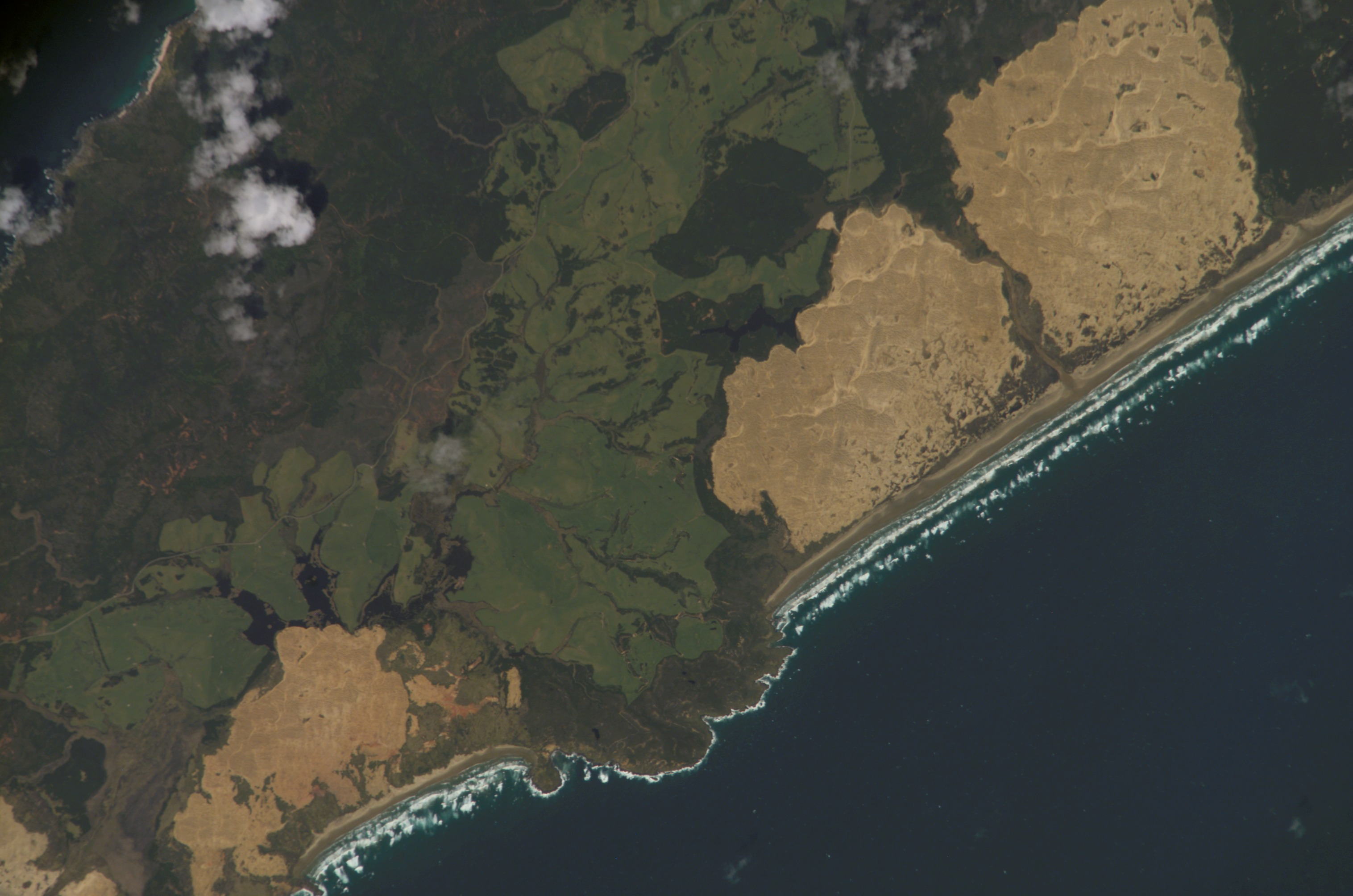
- View of Scott Point and surrounding area in 2007
- Interactive map of Scott Point
- Coordinates: 34.524°S 172.706°E
- Location: Kaipara Harbour, New Zealand

Scott Point (officially Tiriparepa / Scott Point) is a point at the northern end of Ninety Mile Beach in the Northland Region, New Zealand. It is the site of a major intertidal green-lipped mussel population.
