= Wakatehāua Island =

Group of islands in New Zealand

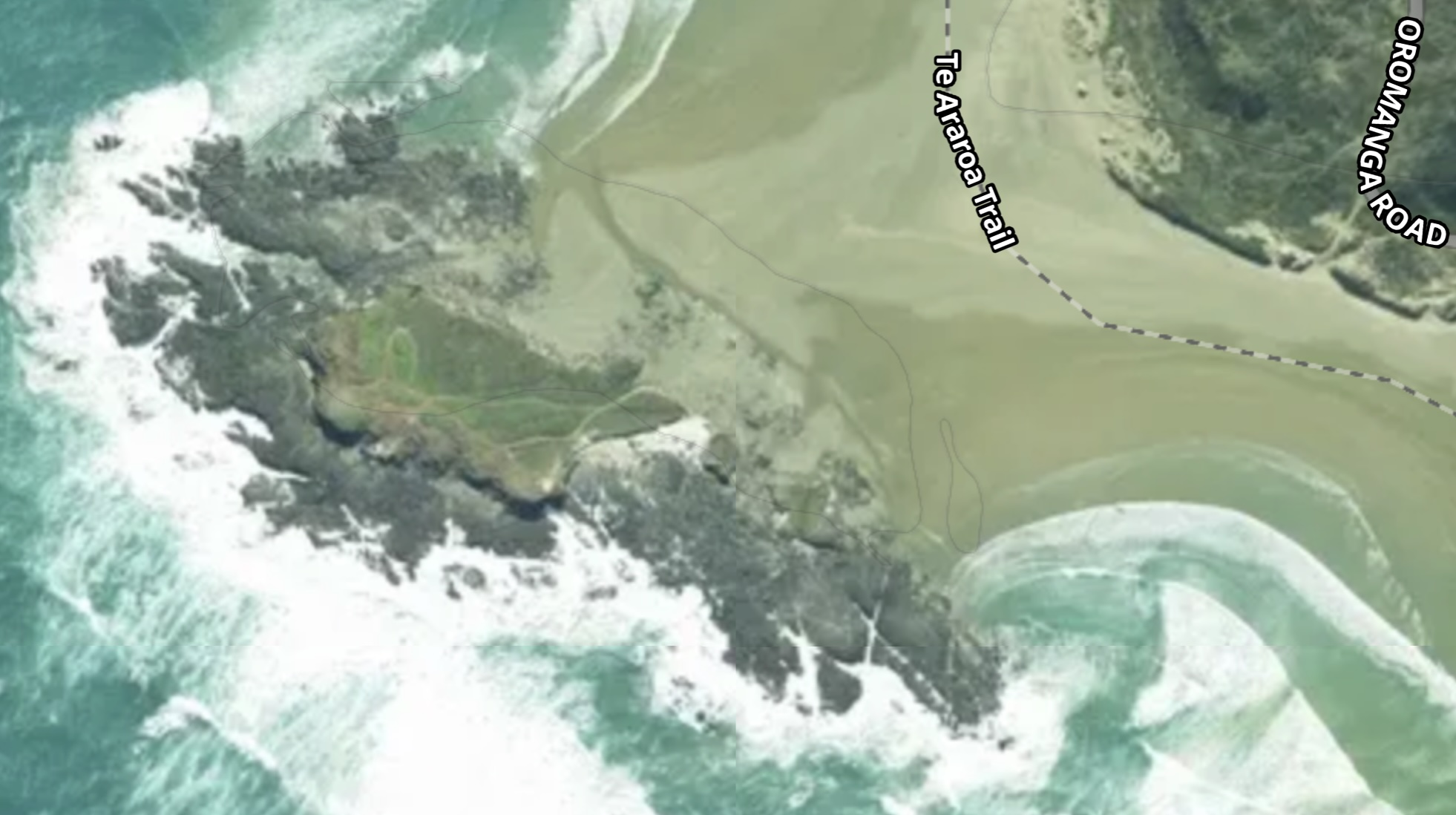
- Wakatehāua Island.
- Interactive map of Wakatehāua Island

Geography
- Location: Te-Oneroa-a-Tōhē / Ninety Mile Beach
- Coordinates: 34.686°S 172.890°E
- Area: .071 km^{2} (0.027 sq mi)
- Length: .59 km (0.367 mi)
- Width: .26 km (0.162 mi)
- Highest elevation: 7 m (23 ft)

Administration
- New Zealand

Wakatehāua Island is a very small island, beside Te-Oneroa-a-Tōhē / Ninety Mile Beach, one of only two Northland west coast islands (the other being Matapia Island, further up the beach). As the island looked like a canoe, it was given the name Te Waka e Haua. The area may have been populated from the 14th century. Senecio repangae grows on the island. In 1935 tree stumps were exposed, which it was suggested showed evidence that the island had been part of the mainland until they were covered by sand.

The island was being used for camping in 1935. In 1936 the Ministry of Works blasted some rocks to allow driving along the beach by the island at most states of tide.

== See also ==
- List of islands of New Zealand
