= Peter de Lange (botanist) =

New Zealand botanist (born 1966)

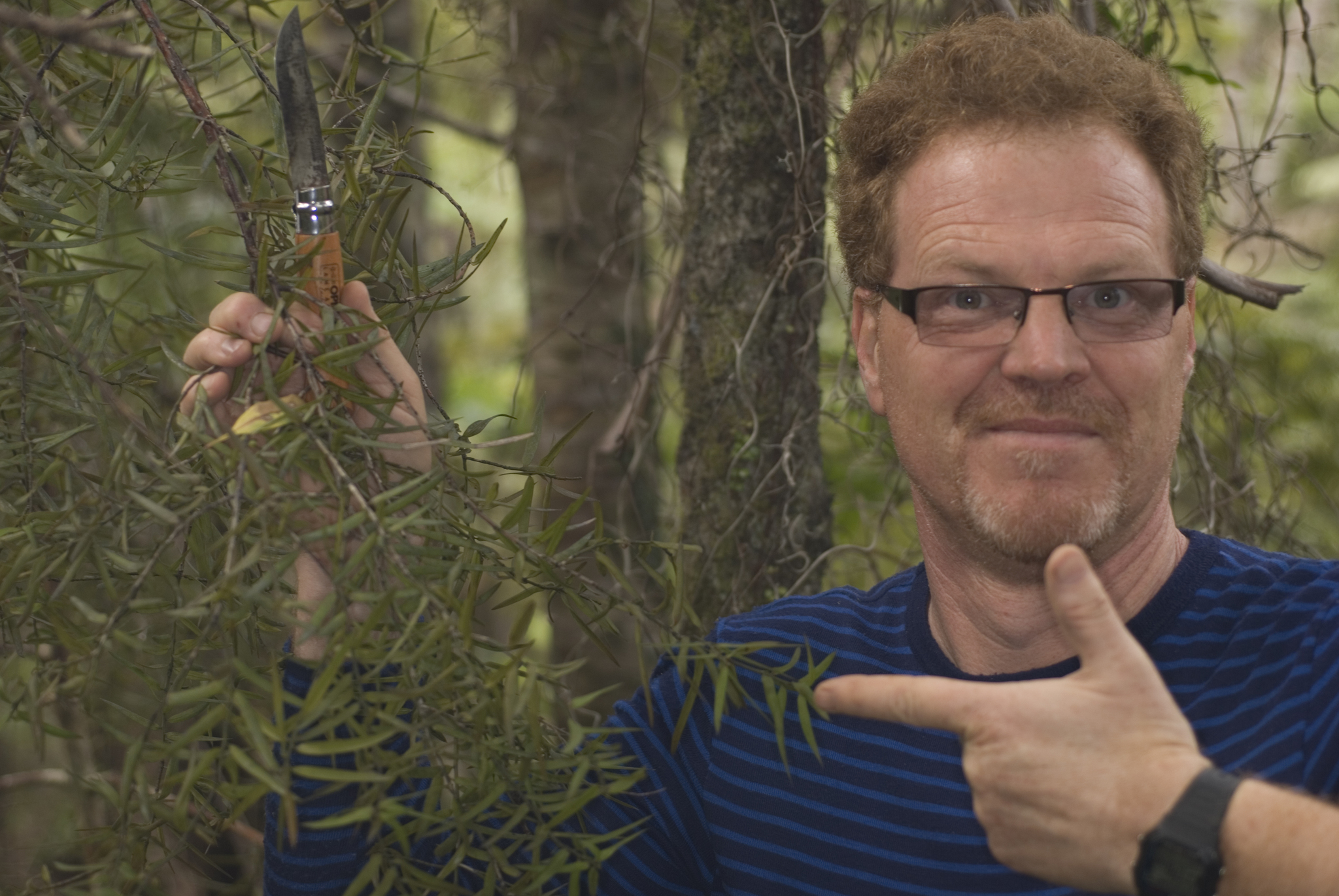
- Peter de Lange
- Born: 1966; Hamilton
- Education: Doctor of Philosophy
- Alma mater: University of Waikato; University of Auckland
- Occupation: Botanist, botanical collector, university teacher
- Employer: Department of Conservation (1990–2017); Unitec Institute of Technology (2017–); University of Sassari (2013–2013)
- Awards: Loder Cup (2017); Allan Mere award (2006)

Peter James de Lange (born 1966) is a New Zealand botanist at Unitec Institute of Technology. He is a Fellow of the Linnean Society, and has received the New Zealand Botanical Society Allan Mere award and the Loder Cup for his botanical work. Two species are named in his honour. The standard author abbreviation de Lange is used to indicate this person as the author when citing a botanical name.

== Education ==
Born and schooled in Hamilton, New Zealand, de Lange graduated from the University of Waikato as B.Sc. in biological and earth sciences, then as M.Sc. in paleoecology and tephrochronostratigraphy. He has a PhD from the University of Auckland, the subject of his thesis being the biosystematics of Kunzea ericoides (kānuka).

== Career ==
From 1990 to 2017 de Lange worked as a threatened plant scientist in the Ecosystems and Species Unit of Research and Development in the New Zealand Department of Conservation. He is an adjunct Professor at the University of Sassari in Sardinia and now employed as a Professor in the School of Environmental & Animal Sciences, Unitec Institute of Technology in New Zealand.

== Honours and awards ==
De Lange is a Fellow of the Linnean Society, recipient of the New Zealand Botanical Society Allan Mere award (2006) and also the Loder Cup (2017) for his botanical work. One plant, the Three Kings Islands endemic kawakawa (pepper) described in 1997 as Macropiper excelsum subsp peltatum f. delangei and now placed in Piper, as P. excelsum subsp. delangei is named in his honour. In February 2021 a lichen, Amandinea delangei was also named in his honour based on specimens he had collected from Te Wakatehaua, Oneroa-o-Tohe (Ninety Mile Beach), Te Aupouri, Northland, North Island, New Zealand. He is the author of 30 books and 180 scientific papers.

== Personal life ==
De Lange has two sons, including Theodore de Lange, a postgraduate science student who assists him with research, such as with noting new locations of the threatened lichen Caloplaca maculata D.J.Galloway.

== See also ==
- Category:Taxa named by Peter James de Lange
