= Mokohinau Islands Lighthouse =

Lighthouse in New Zealand

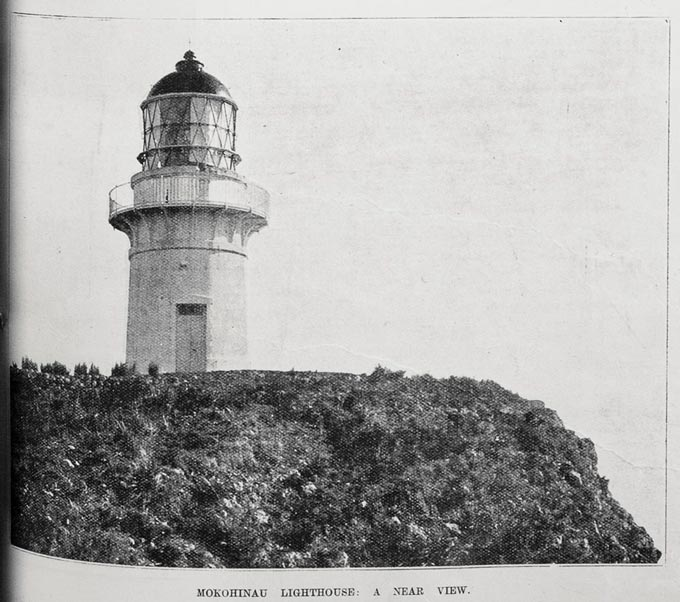
- The lighthouse, 25 September 1902
- Location: Mokohinau Islands; North Island; New Zealand
- Coordinates: 35°54′23″S 175°06′54″E

Tower
- Constructed: 1883
- Construction: stone tower
- Automated: 1980
- Height: 14 metres (46 ft)
- Shape: cylindrical tower with balcony and lantern
- Markings: white tower, black balcony
- Power source: solar power

Light
- First lit: 1883
- Focal height: 122 metres (400 ft)
- Range: 19 nautical miles (35 km; 22 mi)
- Characteristic: Fl W 10s.

Mokohinau Islands Lighthouse is a lighthouse on Burgess Island, one of the Mokohinau Islands, which lie off the northeast coast of the North Island of New Zealand. It is owned and operated by Maritime New Zealand. The lighthouse sits at the entrance to the Hauraki Gulf as the landfall light for vessels approaching Auckland from the north and northeast.

The lighthouse was built in 1883 and first lit during June of that year. Its isolated position, approximately 50 km northeast of Cape Rodney makes it one of the most distant lighthouses from the mainland.

During World War II, the lighthouse was turned off as a German destroyer was suspected to be in the area laying mines. The lighthouse was not relit until 1947.

In 1980, the lighthouse was fully automated and the lighthouse keepers were withdrawn. The lighthouse is now monitored remotely from Wellington. The white light flashes every 10 seconds and can be seen for 19 nautical miles (35 km).

== See also ==
- List of lighthouses in New Zealand
