= Mokohinau gecko =

Conservation status
- Naturally Uncommon (NZ TCS)

Scientific classification
- Domain: Eukaryota
- Kingdom: Animalia
- Phylum: Chordata
- Class: Reptilia
- Order: Squamata
- Infraorder: Gekkota
- Family: Diplodactylidae
- Genus: Dactylocnemis
- Species: D. "Mokohinau"

Binomial name
- Dactylocnemis "Mokohinau"
- Distribution of the Mokohinau gecko on a North Island map Known native range

Species of lizard

The Mokohinau gecko (Dactylocnemis "Mokohinau") is an undescribed species of gecko found in the Mokohinau Islands, 100 km (62 mi) north of Auckland in the Auckland Region of New Zealand.

== Taxonomy ==
Currently Dactylocnemis pacificus is the only described member of the genus Dactylocnemis, however five geographically isolated populations, including the Mokohinau gecko, likely represent distinct species. The Mokohinau gecko has been variously referred to as Hoplodactylus "Mokohinau", Hoplodactylus "Mokohinaus", Dactylocnemis "Mokohinaus" and Dactylocnemis "Mokohinau". The interim name was standardised as Dactylocnemis "Mokohinau" in 2014.

== Description ==
The gecko has a length of up to 90 mm (3.5 in), with its tail making up approximately half of its total body length. The species is highly variable in colour and pattern, often grey, brown or olive green with a cream-coloured underside. Often geckos will have a mustard-yellow crescent on their necks. The species has brown or olive-coloured eyes, and 3-4 large cloacal spurs on other side of its body. It can be distinguished from Duvaucel's gecko due to adult Mokohinau geckos being smaller in size, and having fewer subdigital lamellae (between 10 and 14).

== Behaviour ==
The species living in semi-arboreal coastal and cliff habitats and is nocturnal, although on occasion may be seen sun basking. The species may occasionally enter water and be pray for marine fish species surrounding the islands. Other than around rocks and rock crevices, Mokohinau geckos can often be found on Muehlenbeckia vines, flax, trees or below dense vegetation. Typically the species reproduces annually, giving birth to one or two babies during the late summer or early autumn. The species primarily eats insects.

== Geographic distribution and habitat ==
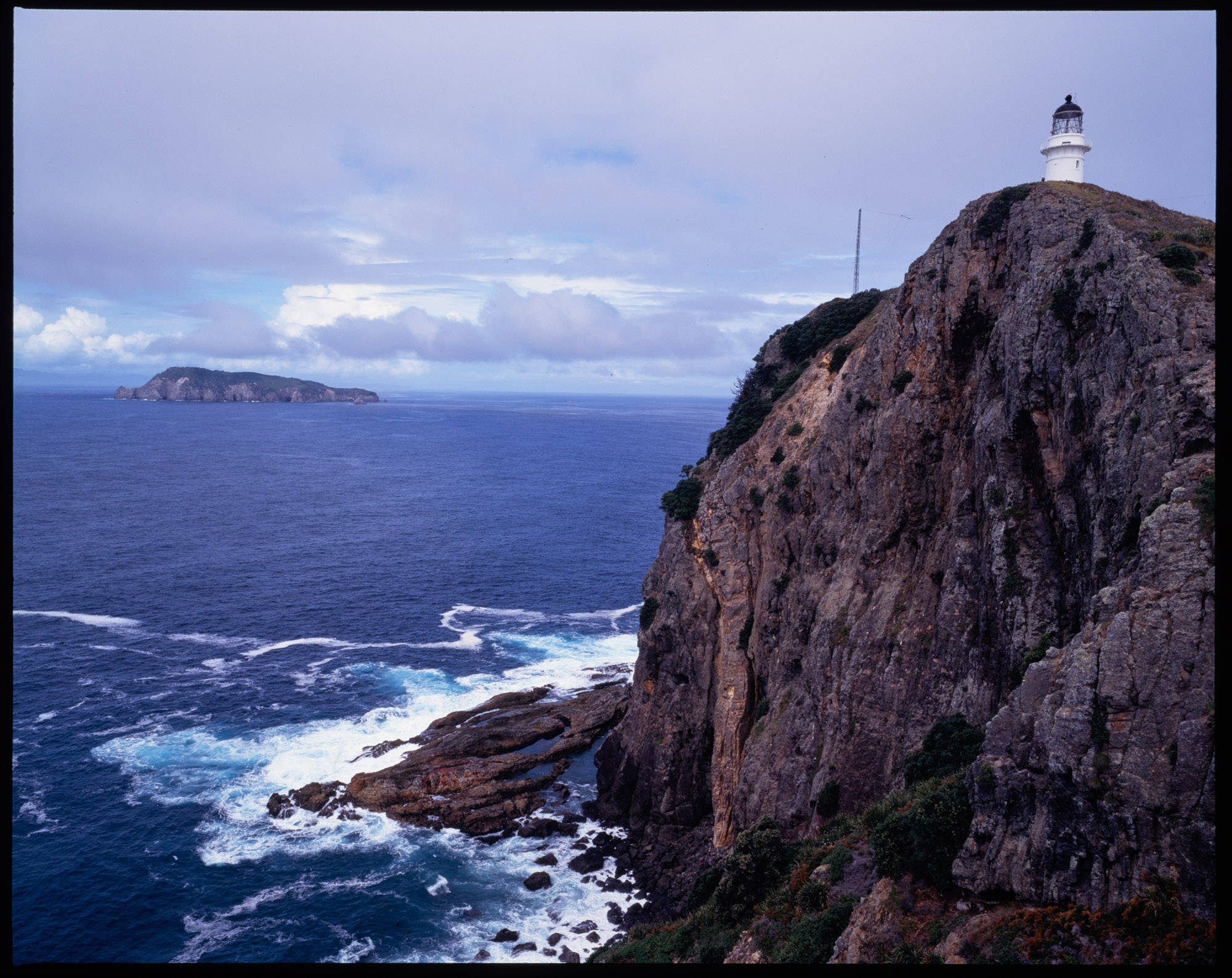
The species is endemic to the Mokohinau Islands

The Mokohinau gecko is found exclusively in the Mokohinau Islands of the Auckland Region, New Zealand.
