= Te Paki Sand Dunes =

Sand dunes in northern New Zealand

Te Paki Sand Dunes Giant Sand Dunes
- Sand dunes
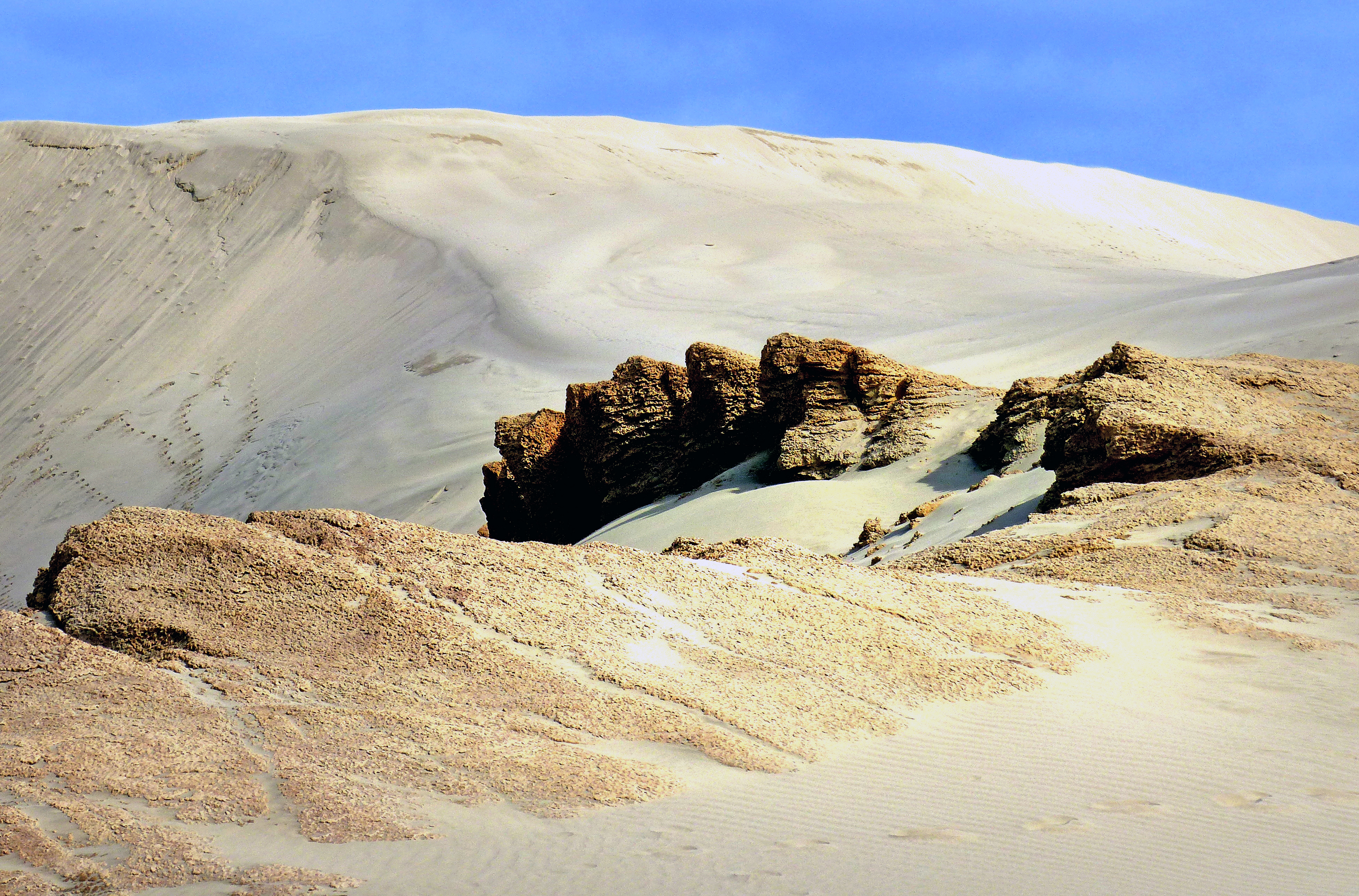
- A Te Paki Sand Dune

- Location within Northland Region Location within North Island Location within New Zealand
- Coordinates: 34.54°S 172.77°E
- Location: Northland, New Zealand

Area
  - Total: 10 square kilometres (3.9 mi^{2})
- Elevation: 150 m (490 ft)

Te Paki Sand Dunes, also called the Giant Sand Dunes, are a collection of sand dunes located on the Northland Peninsula of New Zealand. The dunes abut the Ninety Mile Beach and are a popular spot for sandboarding.

== Geography ==
The dunes are located on the western (Tasman Sea) side of the Aupouri Peninsula and are southeast of Cape Reinga Lighthouse. They cover an area of approximately 10 kilometres (6.2 mi) by 1 kilometre (0.62 mi), with some individual dunes rising up to 150 metres (490 ft).

Te Paki Stream runs through the area and contains many native flora and fauna.

== History ==
In 1966 the Department of Lands and Survey purchased the Te Paki Station to create a coastal park. In 1969 the Department contracted archaeologist Janet Davidson to undertake an archaeological survey. Her fieldwork, which was completed between 1969 and 1971, found that the Te Paki dunes have a rich archaeological history which can be threatened by erosion and difficult to protect. A variety of site types were recorded: 45 pa sites; 207 pit, terrace and hut sites; middens; and 19th century sandstone walls. Taro were also found growing.

== Ecology ==
The wider Te Paki area is home to a diverse range of ecosystems and of native flora and fauna.

== Sandboarding ==
Sandsurfing is a popular activity at the dunes. Guided tours around Cape Reinga often stop at the dunes to sandboard.

== Climate ==
Climate data for Te Paki (1951–1980)
Month	Jan	Feb	Mar	Apr	May	Jun	Jul	Aug	Sep	Oct	Nov	Dec	Year
Mean daily maximum °C (°F)	23.2 (73.8)	23.7 (74.7)	22.9 (73.2)	20.7 (69.3)	18.4 (65.1)	16.6 (61.9)	15.7 (60.3)	16.0 (60.8)	16.8 (62.2)	18.0 (64.4)	19.8 (67.6)	21.6 (70.9)	19.5 (67.0)
Daily mean °C (°F)	18.8 (65.8)	19.3 (66.7)	18.6 (65.5)	16.5 (61.7)	14.5 (58.1)	12.9 (55.2)	11.7 (53.1)	12.2 (54.0)	12.8 (55.0)	14.1 (57.4)	15.7 (60.3)	17.3 (63.1)	15.4 (59.7)
Mean daily minimum °C (°F)	14.3 (57.7)	14.9 (58.8)	14.2 (57.6)	12.3 (54.1)	10.6 (51.1)	9.1 (48.4)	7.7 (45.9)	8.3 (46.9)	8.8 (47.8)	10.1 (50.2)	11.6 (52.9)	13.0 (55.4)	11.2 (52.2)
Average rainfall mm (inches)	90 (3.5)	116 (4.6)	95 (3.7)	135 (5.3)	141 (5.6)	171 (6.7)	173 (6.8)	170 (6.7)	127 (5.0)	94 (3.7)	83 (3.3)	75 (3.0)	1,470 (57.9)
Mean monthly sunshine hours	229	181	176	162	144	119	135	150	168	185	209	220	2,078
Source: NIWA
