= Ninety Mile Beach, New Zealand =

Beach in the North Island of New Zealand

Te-Oneroa-a-Tōhē / Ninety Mile Beach
- Beach
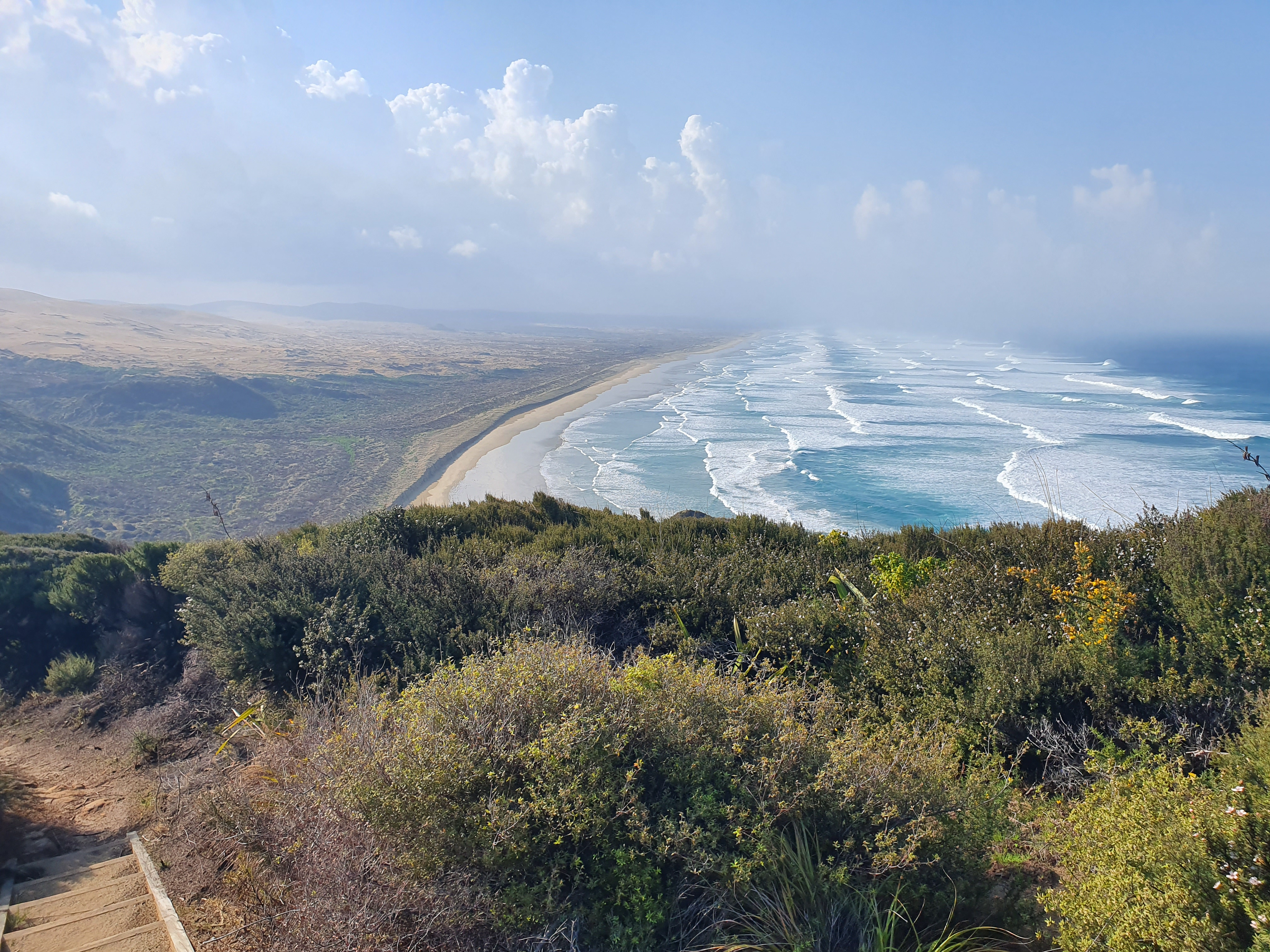
- Te-Oneroa-a-Tōhē / Ninety Mile Beach, as viewed from Tiriparepa / Scott Point

- Location within New Zealand
- Coordinates: 34°43′S 172°56′E
- Location: Northland Region
- Water bodies: Tasman Sea

Dimensions
  - Length: 88 kilometres (55 mi)

Te-Oneroa-a-Tōhē / Ninety Mile Beach is on the western coast of the far north of the North Island of New Zealand. The beach is actually 88 kilometres (55 miles) long. Its southern end is close to the headland of Tauroa Point (Reef Point), to the west of Ahipara Bay, near Kaitaia. From there it sweeps briefly northeast before running northwest along the Aupōuri Peninsula for the majority of its length. It ends at Tiriparepa / Scott Point, 5 kilometres (3 mi) south of Cape Maria van Diemen and about 10 kilometres (6 mi) south of Cape Reinga / Te Rerenga Wairua.

The beach is officially a public highway and is used as an alternative to State Highway 1 north of Kaitaia, though mainly for tourist trips, or when the main road is closed due to landslides or floods. The beach and the dunes at Te Paki in the north are a tourist destination. The Te Paki dunes, which look much like a desert landscape, are used for sandboarding.

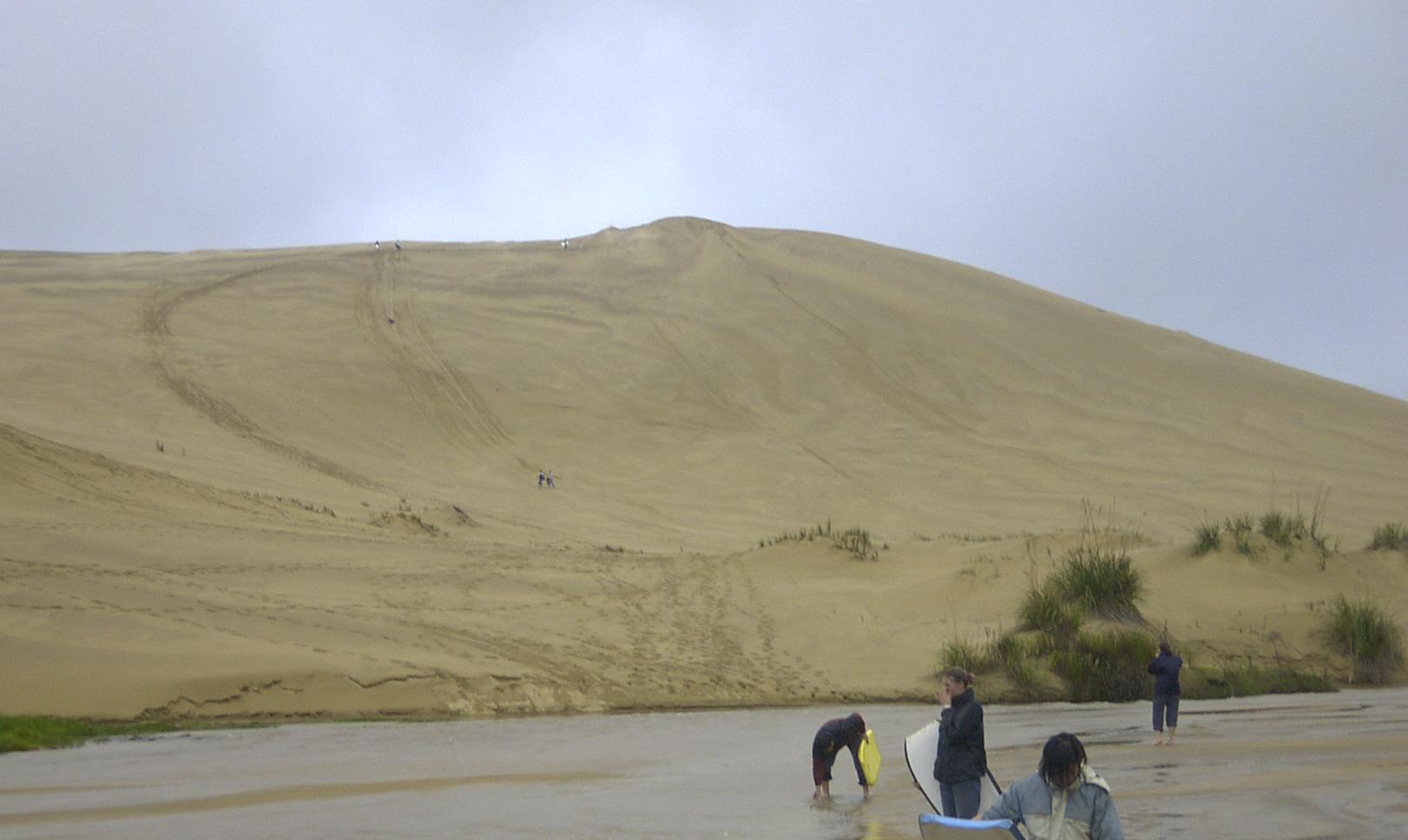
Bodyboarding down the Te Paki dunes is a popular tourist activity.

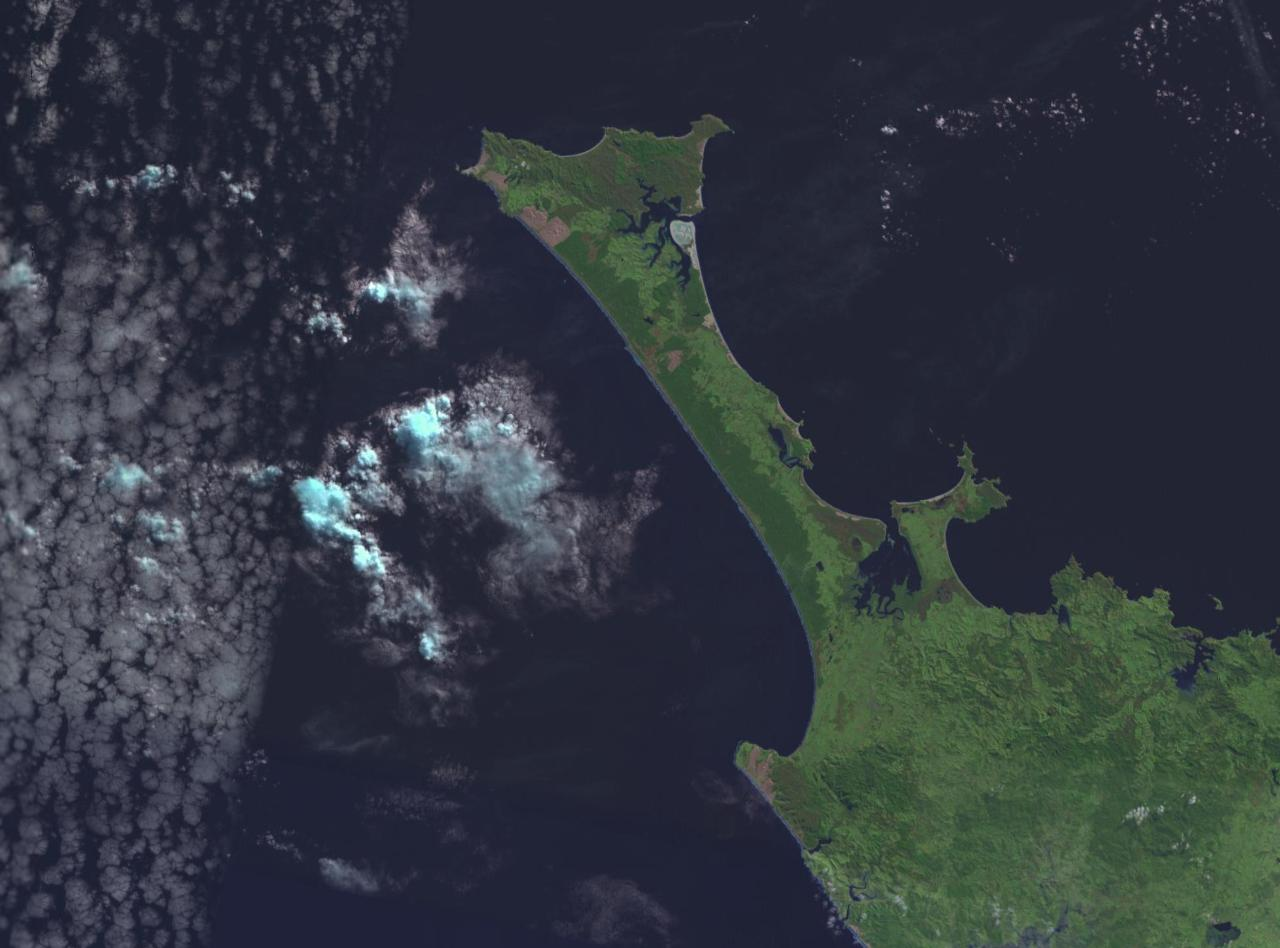
NASA satellite photo of the Aupōuri Peninsula and Ninety Mile Beach

== History ==
In the days of sailing ships a number of vessels were wrecked on the beach.

In 1932 the beach was used as the runway for some of the earliest airmail services between Australia and New Zealand.

Ninety Mile Beach was included as part of Te Araroa when it officially opened in 2011.

In a 2013 feature for the British television motoring programme Top Gear, Jeremy Clarkson drove the length of the beach in a Toyota Corolla as part of a race against an AC45 racing yacht crewed by British Olympic sailor Sir Ben Ainslie and the winning crew of the 2010 America's Cup, with James May also on board.

== Name ==
Te-Oneroa-a-Tōhē / Ninety Mile Beach is one of many places in New Zealand to have a dual name, consisting of both its former English name and its Māori name. This dual name was adopted in 2014 as a result of a Treaty of Waitangi settlement between the New Zealand government and Ngāti Kurī, an iwi based in the area around the beach. The Māori name for the beach translates as "the long beach of Tōhē", referencing an early ancestor of Ngāti Kurī. The English portion of the dual name has unclear origins and is often the source of confusion, given that the beach is only 55 miles (88.5 km) long – not ninety. A common story for the name holds that early Europeans took three days to traverse the beach, with their horses typically able to cover thirty miles per day. According to the legend, the Europeans took this to mean that the beach was 90 miles long, failing to account for their slower speed due to the sand.

== See also ==
- In Re the Ninety-Mile Beach, a court decision regarding title to the foreshore
- Matapia Island
- Wakatehāua Island

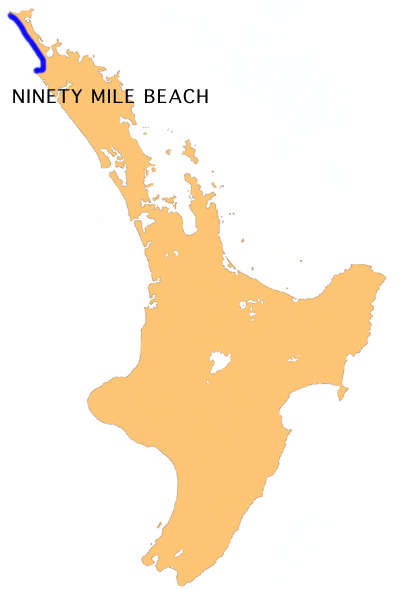
Location of Ninety Mile Beach
