= Mokohinau Islands =

Island group in New Zealand

Māori: Mokohinau
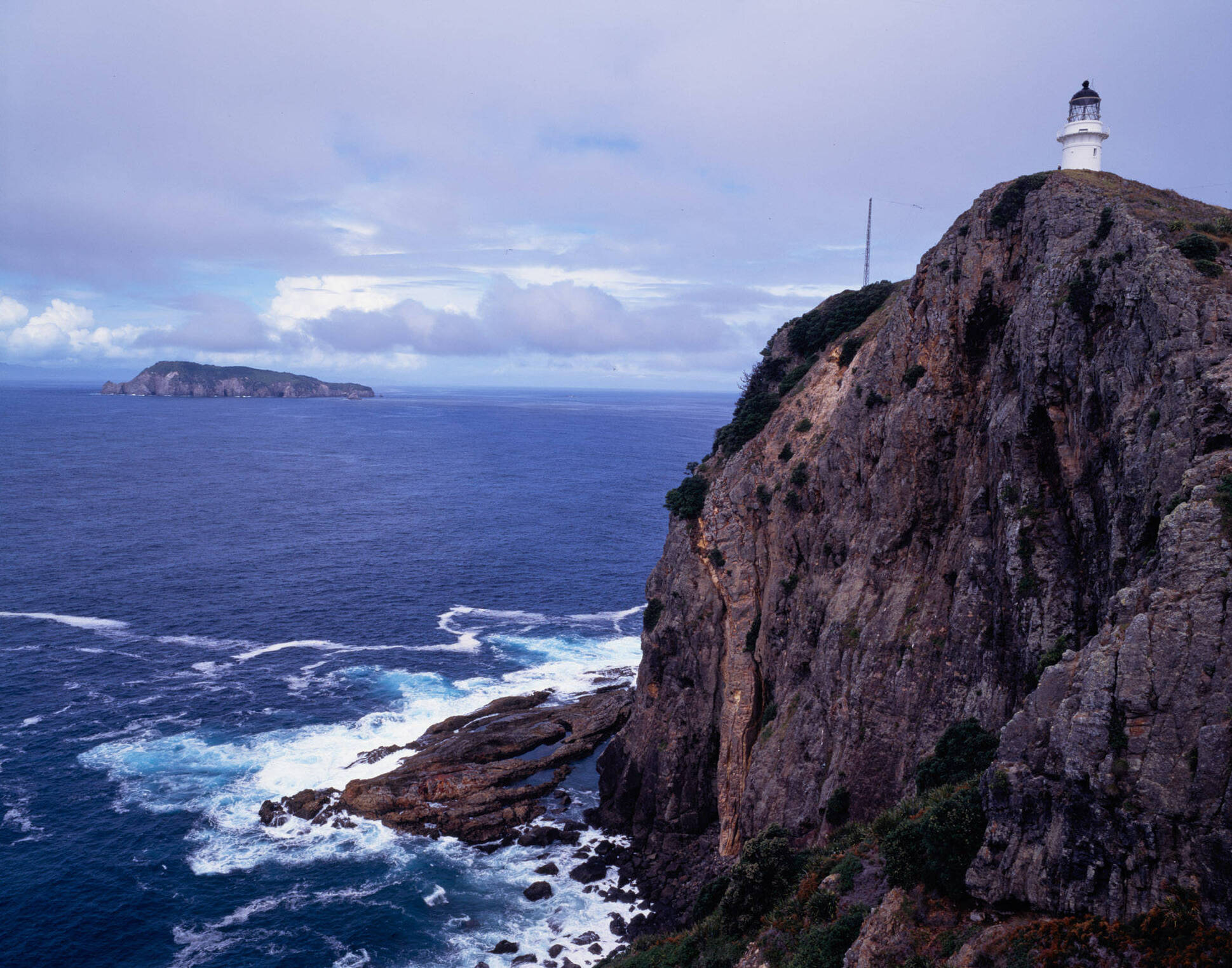
- View of the Mokohinau Islands Lighthouse on Burgess Island / Pokohinu, with Fanal island (Motukino) in the distance
- Interactive map of Mokohinau Islands

Geography
- Coordinates: 35°55′S 175°07′E
- Area: 1.6 km^{2} (0.62 sq mi)
- Highest elevation: 136 m (446 ft)

Administration
- New Zealand

Demographics
- Population: 0

The Mokohinau Islands (Pokohinau), sometimes spelt Mokohīnau Islands are a small group of islands that lie off the northeast coast of New Zealand's North Island. The islands are 100 km (62 mi) northeast of Auckland, 21 km (13 mi) northwest of Great Barrier Island and approximately 52 km (32 mi) east of Bream Head. The main islands of the group include Fanal Island (Motukino), Burgess Island (Pokohinu), Flax Island (Hokoromea), and Atihau Island. Smaller islands include Bird Rock. Most of them are managed by the Department of Conservation as nature reserves and wildlife sanctuaries. Landing is not allowed without a permit, with the exception of Burgess Island, much of which is managed as a scenic reserve by the Department of Conservation. The remainder of Burgess Island is Crown Land and is administered by the Ministry of Transport. The total land area of the Mokohinau Islands is 160 ha (400 acres).

== Geology ==
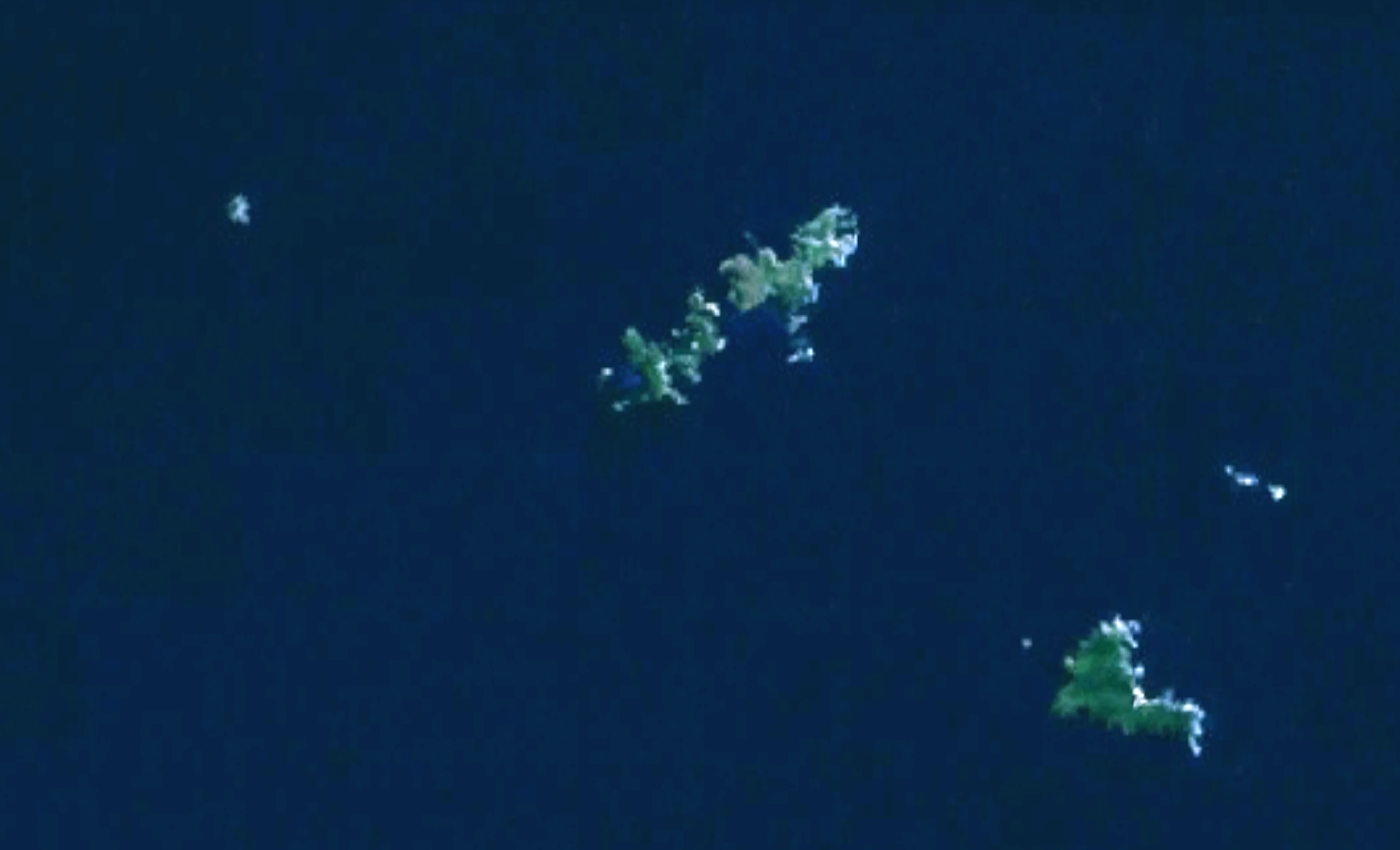
Satellite view of the islands

The islands are volcanic stacks sitting at the edge of the continental shelf. Mokohinau formed between 10 and 8.5 million years ago, as a part of the Coromandel Volcanic Zone, which has since moved southwards to form the modern Taupō Volcanic Zone.

== History ==
The islands were often visited seasonally by Māori for muttonbirding, harvesting the chicks of petrels for food and oil. Today, the main attractions for the rare tourists are the very clear waters teeming with wildlife.

Like many neighbouring Hauraki Gulf islands, the group is free of mammalian pests and being left to naturally regenerate. The Mokohinau Islands are home to a number of New Zealand's smallest endangered species, such as the Mokohinau skink, the Mokohinau gecko, the robust skink and the Mokohinau stag beetle as well as a number of endangered plant species.

Burgess Island is also the location of the Mokohinau Islands Lighthouse, one of the most distant lights from the mainland. The light was built in 1883 and was one of the last in the country to be fully automated in 1980.

== Climate ==
Mokohinau Island has a mild oceanic climate (Cfb) with mild, somewhat humid summers and mild winters, with rainfall spread throughout the months. Frost has never been recorded.

Climate data for Mokohinau Island Aws (1991–2020 normals, extremes 1972–1980, 1994–present)
Month	Jan	Feb	Mar	Apr	May	Jun	Jul	Aug	Sep	Oct	Nov	Dec	Year
Record high °C (°F)	29.0 (84.2)	29.5 (85.1)	27.8 (82.0)	24.7 (76.5)	22.7 (72.9)	19.5 (67.1)	18.5 (65.3)	19.9 (67.8)	20.1 (68.2)	23.2 (73.8)	23.6 (74.5)	27.8 (82.0)	29.5 (85.1)
Mean daily maximum °C (°F)	22.4 (72.3)	23.0 (73.4)	21.8 (71.2)	19.8 (67.6)	17.5 (63.5)	15.6 (60.1)	14.8 (58.6)	14.8 (58.6)	15.7 (60.3)	17.1 (62.8)	18.7 (65.7)	20.7 (69.3)	18.5 (65.3)
Daily mean °C (°F)	20.0 (68.0)	20.6 (69.1)	19.6 (67.3)	17.9 (64.2)	15.9 (60.6)	14.1 (57.4)	13.2 (55.8)	13.1 (55.6)	13.8 (56.8)	15.0 (59.0)	16.4 (61.5)	18.4 (65.1)	16.5 (61.7)
Mean daily minimum °C (°F)	17.5 (63.5)	18.3 (64.9)	17.5 (63.5)	16.1 (61.0)	14.3 (57.7)	12.6 (54.7)	11.7 (53.1)	11.5 (52.7)	12.0 (53.6)	12.9 (55.2)	14.0 (57.2)	16.0 (60.8)	14.5 (58.2)
Record low °C (°F)	6.5 (43.7)	12.2 (54.0)	10.8 (51.4)	7.6 (45.7)	3.0 (37.4)	1.8 (35.2)	4.5 (40.1)	2.0 (35.6)	3.2 (37.8)	5.5 (41.9)	8.4 (47.1)	7.4 (45.3)	1.8 (35.2)
Average rainfall mm (inches)	61.2 (2.41)	57.3 (2.26)	84.9 (3.34)	75.4 (2.97)	88.8 (3.50)	101.4 (3.99)	123.8 (4.87)	93.7 (3.69)	62.6 (2.46)	56.0 (2.20)	46.0 (1.81)	69.3 (2.73)	920.4 (36.23)
Source: NIWA

== See also ==
- Hauraki Gulf
- List of islands of New Zealand
- Desert island
