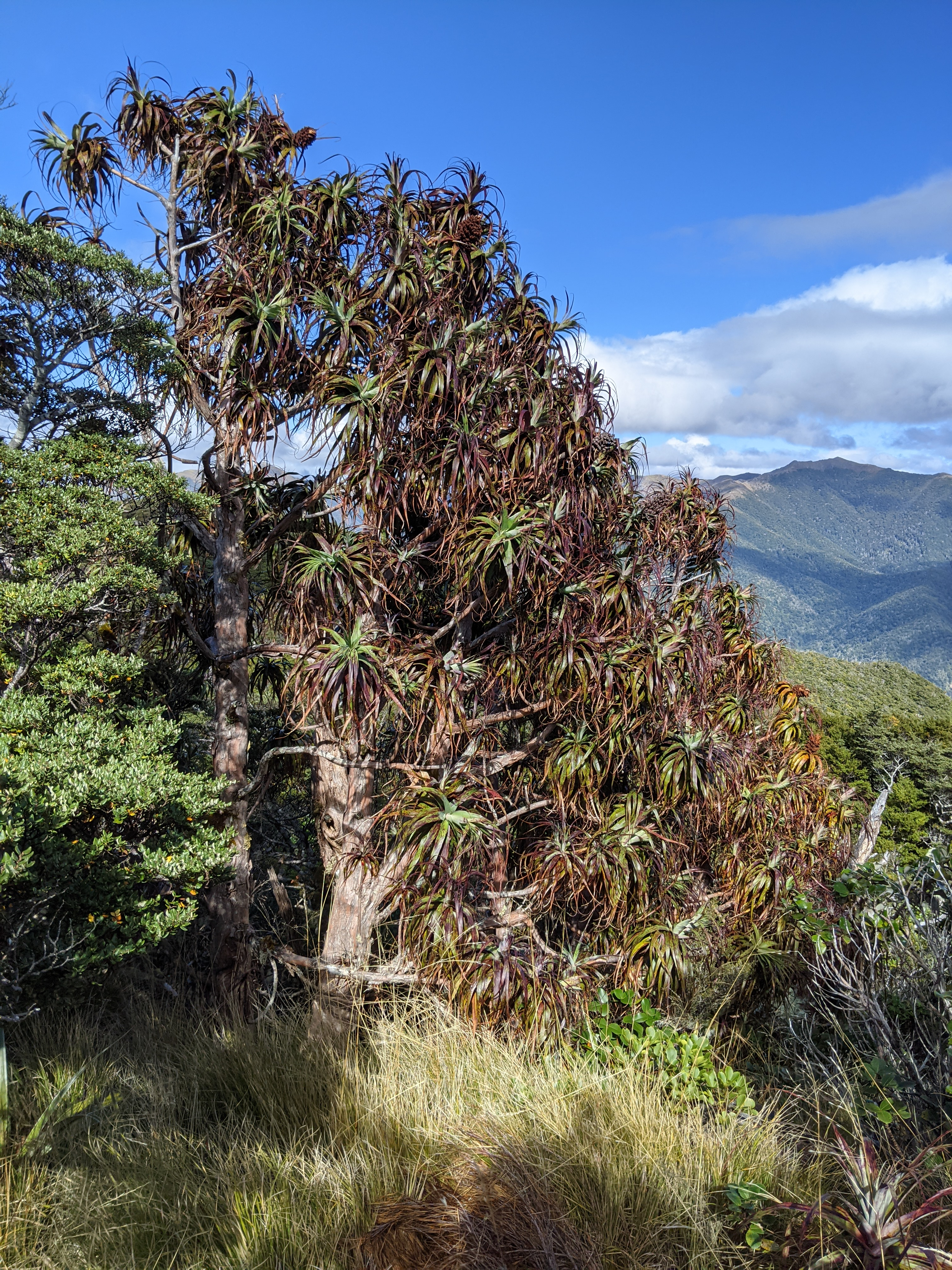

Conservation status
- Least Concern (IUCN 3.1)

Scientific classification
- Kingdom: Plantae
- Clade: Tracheophytes
- Clade: Angiosperms
- Clade: Eudicots
- Clade: Asterids
- Order: Ericales
- Family: Ericaceae
- Genus: Dracophyllum
- Species: D. traversii

Binomial name
- Dracophyllum traversii Hook.f.

Synonyms
- D. pyramidale W.R.B.Oliv.

= Dracophyllum traversii =

Species of flowering plant

Dracophyllum traversii, commonly known as mountain neinei, grass tree, and pineapple tree is a species of flowering plant in the heath family Ericaceae. It is a deciduous tree (or, in some cases, a shrub) endemic to New Zealand. It reaches a height of 0.2–13 m (0.66–42.65 ft) and has leaves which form tufts at the end of its branches. It has a lifespan of between 500 and 600 years.

Similar to some other Dracophyllum species, it has a candelabra-shaped canopy; long, thin, green leaves; and a prominent pyramid-shaped inflorescence. It has tiny red flowers, between 500 and 3000 on each panicle, and equally tiny reddish-brown dry fruit. D. traversii inhabits a variety of forest and shrubland types, from lowland to subalpine, in gorges, on cliffs, and on mountainsides. It has a range that stretches from Waima forest at the top of New Zealand's North Island, down to Otago and Fiordland in the South Island.

It was first described by Joseph Dalton Hooker in 1867, and was placed by Walter Oliver in the subgenus Dracophyllum in 1928. A cladistic analysis using genetic sequencing was published in 2010, revealing that D. traversii was indeed related to D. latifolium as Oliver had thought. The status of D. pyramidale as a synonym is disputed by taxonomic institutions and botanists, with Plants of the World Online not recognising the positions of the New Zealand Organism Register, New Zealand Plant Conversation Network, and various New Zealand botanists.

== Description ==
Dracophyllum traversii is a shrub or tree that grows to a height of 0.2–13 m (0.7–42.7 ft) tall, though those growing in exposed subalpine areas often do not reach 1 m (3.3 ft). Similar to D. elegantissimum, it forms a candelabra-like canopy with its branches, which have flaky light brown bark. Its leaves, which concentrate at the ends of branches like species in the family Bromeliaceae, are 9–86 by 1.7–5 cm (3.5–33.9 by 0.7–2.0 in), leathery, and very finely toothed such that there are 18 to 20 teeth every 10 mm (0.4 in). Plants which grow at the upper reaches of the tree line have a grey wax on their leaves, as well as change colour during Winter from green to a reddish-purple, as a result of anthocyanins.

It flowers from October to February with densely packed 18–40 cm (7.1–15.7 in) long panicle (branched inflorescence), though those growing in full sun may be shorter, producing 500–3000 or more red (though sometimes green) flowers on each. The panicle has a central axis 1.3–1.65 cm (0.51–0.65 in) in diameter with 3–6 cm (1.2–2.4 in) branches at right angles. It is covered in inflorescence bracts (modified leaves) which are 130–240 by 25–50 mm (5.12–9.45 by 0.98–1.97 in) and light green with a white colour at their base and pink at the tip. Its flowers are recaulescent and suspended off of tiny 4.0–4.8 by 0.5–0.7 mm bracteoles and 0.5–2.0 mm long hairy pedicels.

The sepals are a red (sometimes green) colour, egg-shaped, and 1.2–3.0 by 1.1–2.5 mm, which is the same length as the corolla tube. The corolla (petals) itself is red, though the 2.7–3.0 by 4–5 mm bell-shaped tube is occasionally white. Its lobes are reflexed and are 2.5–2.8 by 2.0–2.5 mm. The stamens occur at the top of the corolla tube and consist of a 1.8–2.0 mm long pink (becoming yellow) oblong anther suspended off of a 1.0–1.5 mm long filament. It has a 1.4–1.5 by 1.8–2.0 mm hairless, almost globe-shaped, ovary and 1.0–1.5 by 1.0–1.5 nectary scales. The stigmas are five-lobed and have 2–3 mm long styles.

It fruits from December to May producing yellow-brown coloured 0.95–1 mm long egg-shaped seeds. Surrounding the seeds are red to purple-brown 1.9–2.0 by 2.8–3.0 mm hairless fruit. D. traversii is morphologically very similar to D. latifolium, but differs by its more robust growth habit and leaf and flower characteristics. Its leaves are serrulate as opposed to the serrate leaves of D. latifolium, and it has larger, hairless, sepals, as well as a longer and wider corolla tube and globe-shaped ovary. Its seeds are also much smaller than that of D. latifolium.

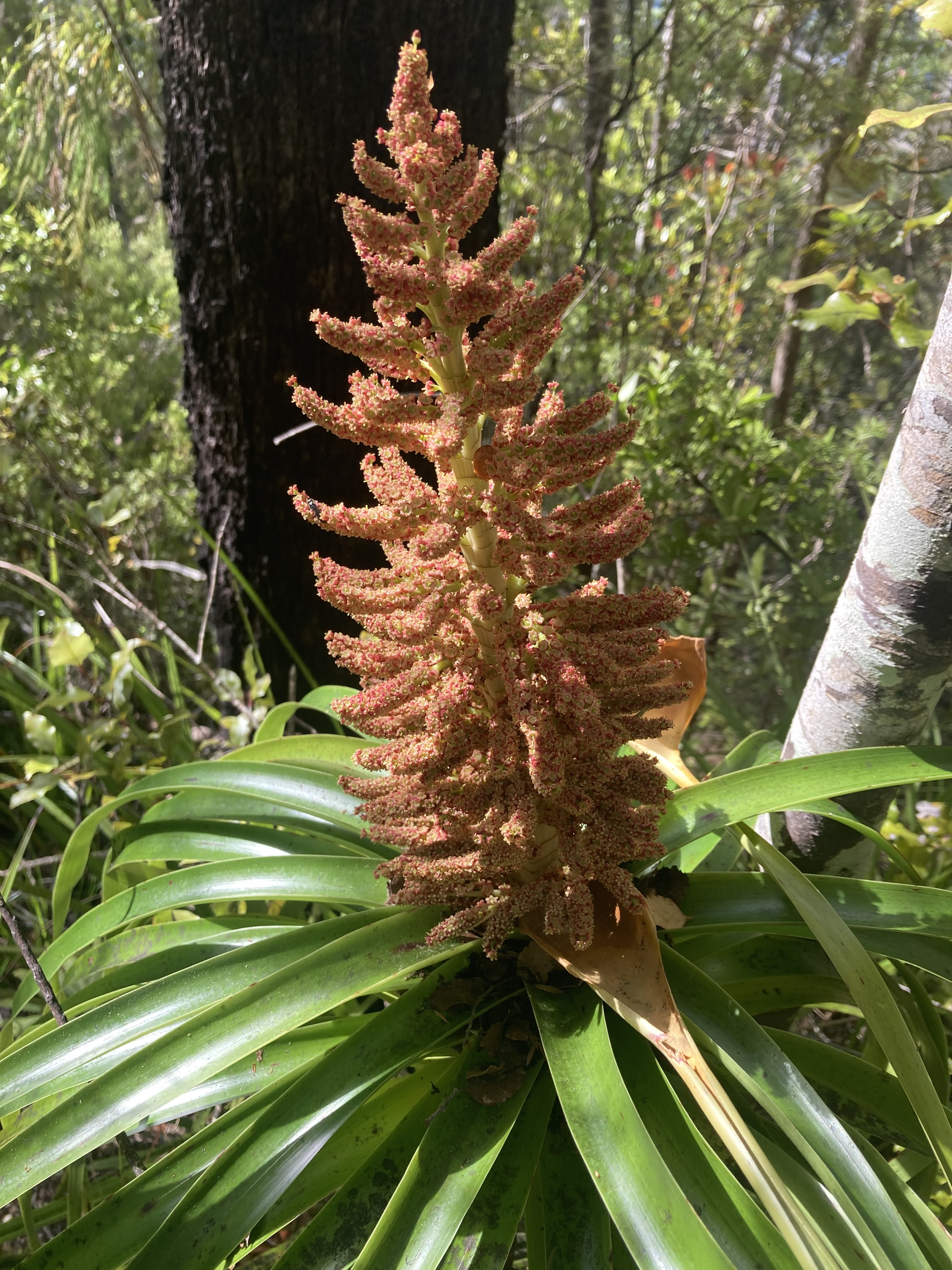
Flowering inflorescence

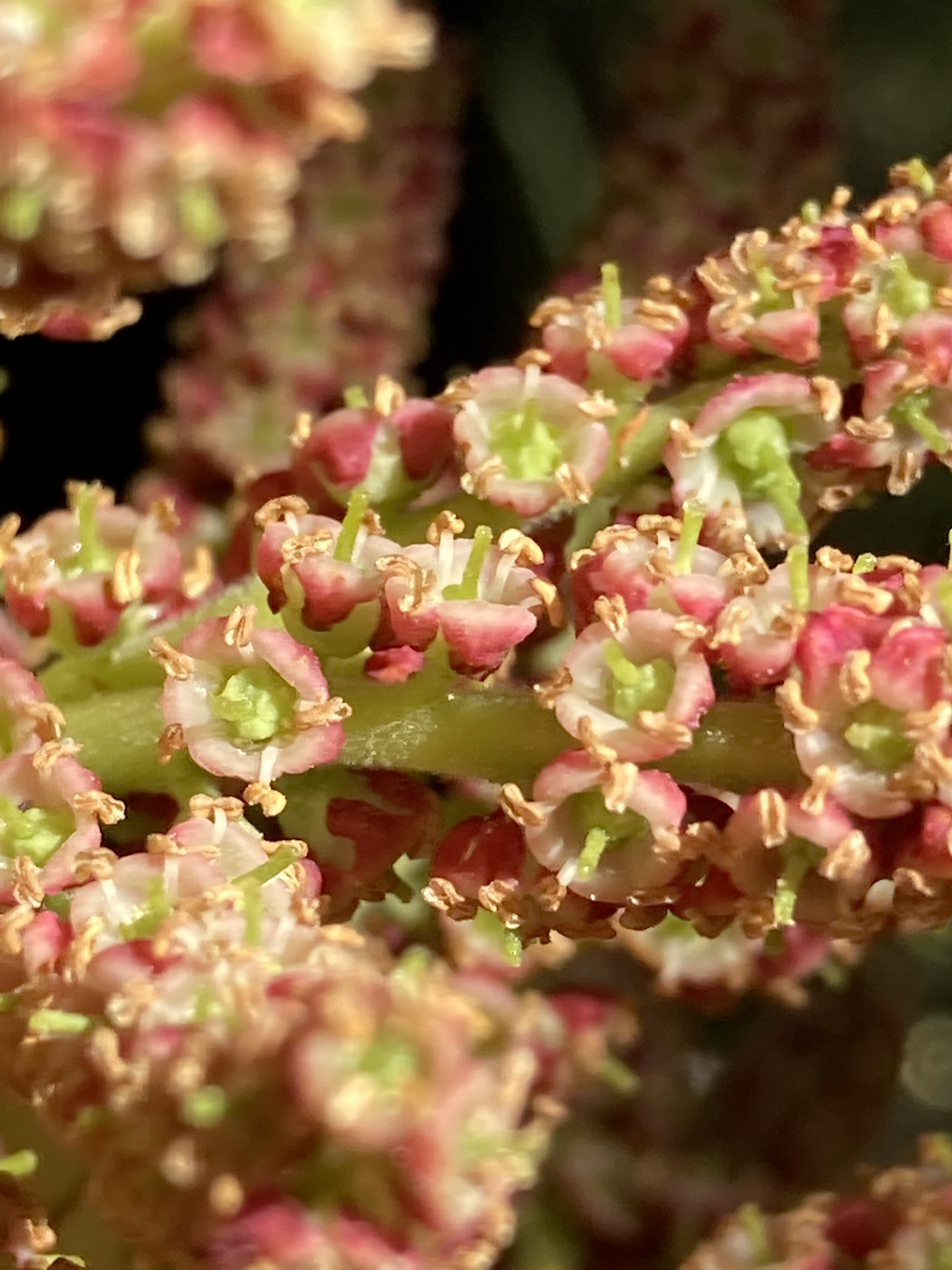
The very small individual flowers

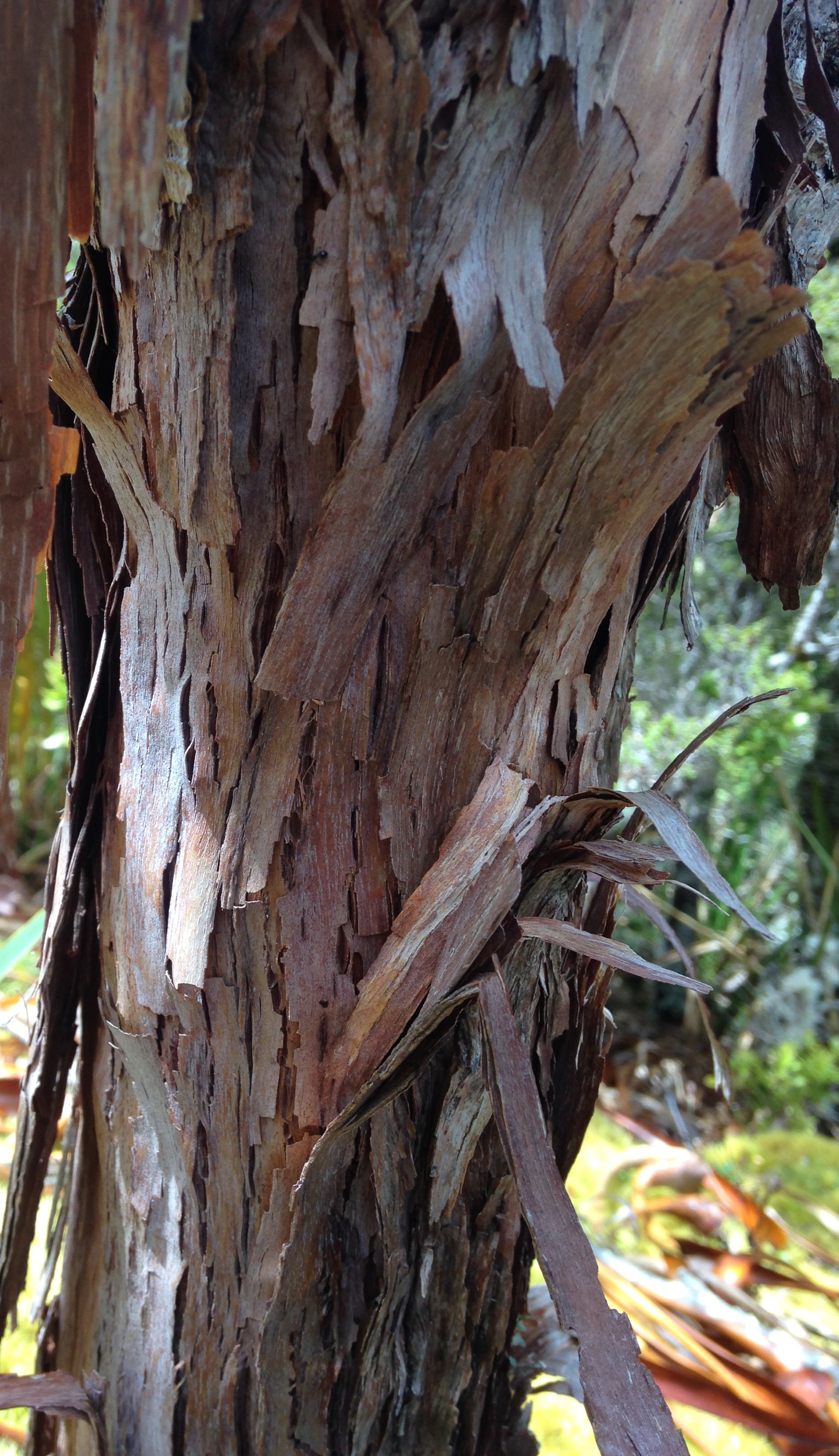
The flaky bark on the trunk

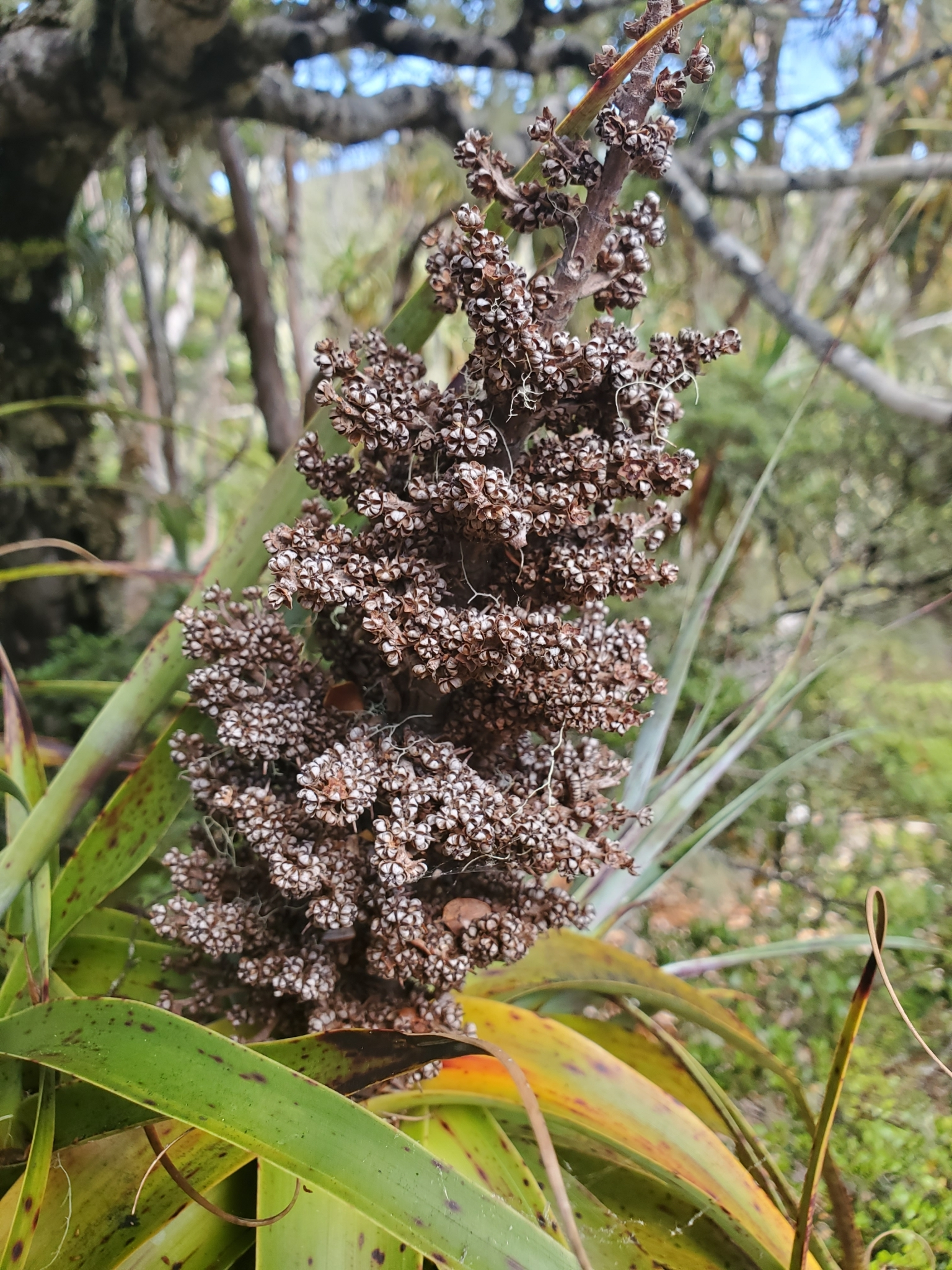
A fruited inflorescence

== Taxonomy ==
- - - - - - - - D. acerosum
              - D. densum
              - D. filifolium
              - D. kirkii
              - D. ophioliticum
              - D. patens
              - D. rosmarinifolium
              - D. trimorphum
            - D. arboreum
            - D. longifolium
            - D. muscoides
            - D. pronum
            - D. scoparium
        - - D. strictum
    - - - - D. fiordense
          - D. menziesii
        - - D. latifolium
          - D. townsonii
      - - D. traversii
  - other Dracophyllum spp.

Cladogram showing the phylogeny of selected species within the genus Dracophyllum, from research published in 2010.
Subgenus Oreothamnus
Subgenus Dracophyllum

Dracophyllum traversii was first described by Joseph Dalton Hooker in 1867, (Note: Part I of the book, pages 1–392, was published in 1864, but part II, pages 393–end (including the section on D. traversii), was published in 1867.) in his Handbook of New Zealand Flora. He described it as "Much the largest species of the genus," and designated the type specimen as one he and J. Haast had collected 914 m (3000 ft) above sea level on the Arthur's pass in the province of Nelson, 1865. (Note: He refers to the location as being in the "Middle Island," which is an archaic name for the South Island.) The New Zealand Plant Conservation Network regards Dracophyllum pyramidale, a similar plant first described by W. R. B. Oliver in 1952, as a synonym of D. traversii. Anthony Peter Druce first merged the two species in an unpublished check-list in 1980. Plants of the World Online, however, regards them as separate species, D. traversii occurring in the South Island and D. pyramidale in the North Island. One 1987 study on the flora of north-west Nelson claimed the only visible difference between D. traversii and D. pyramidale was a wax on the surface of the leaves of D. traversii. Stephanus Venter revised the genus in 2021, maintaining the synonymy of D. pyramidale, citing the 1994 "Trees and Shrubs of New Zealand," and describing the latter as simply a more robust form of D. traversii, with a lower altitude habitat and sheaths and inflorescences of varying lengths.

=== Etymology ===
Dracophyllum means 'dragon leaf', drawing from its similarity to the Dragon Tree from the Canary Islands. The specific epithet traversii refers to William Thomas Locke Travers, a New Zealand lawyer, politician, explorer, and naturalist who lived in New Zealand from 1849. He conducted a study of the flora of the Nelson, Marlborough, and Canterbury regions.

=== Classification and evolution ===
Dracophyllum traversii's placement within the genus Dracophyllum was first attempted by Walter Oliver in a 1928 article of the Transactions and Proceedings of the Royal Society of New Zealand. Later, in 1952, he revised his work in a supplement, placing it in the subgenus Dracophyllum (referred to as Eudracophyllum) and in a group with D. latifolium, though basing his research purely on morphological characteristics. Wagstaff et al. 2010 used cladistics to produce a phylogenetic tree of the tribe Richeeae and other species using genetic sequencing. They found that only the subgenus Oreothamnus and the tribe Richeeae were monophyletic and that there is strong genetic evidence for D. traversii's clade. The paraphyly of the genus Dracophyllum, as well as the polyphyly of the closely related genus Richea, they argued, suggested that a major taxonomic revision was required. Venter 2021 undertook this revision. D. traversii's current placement can be summarised in the cladogram at right.

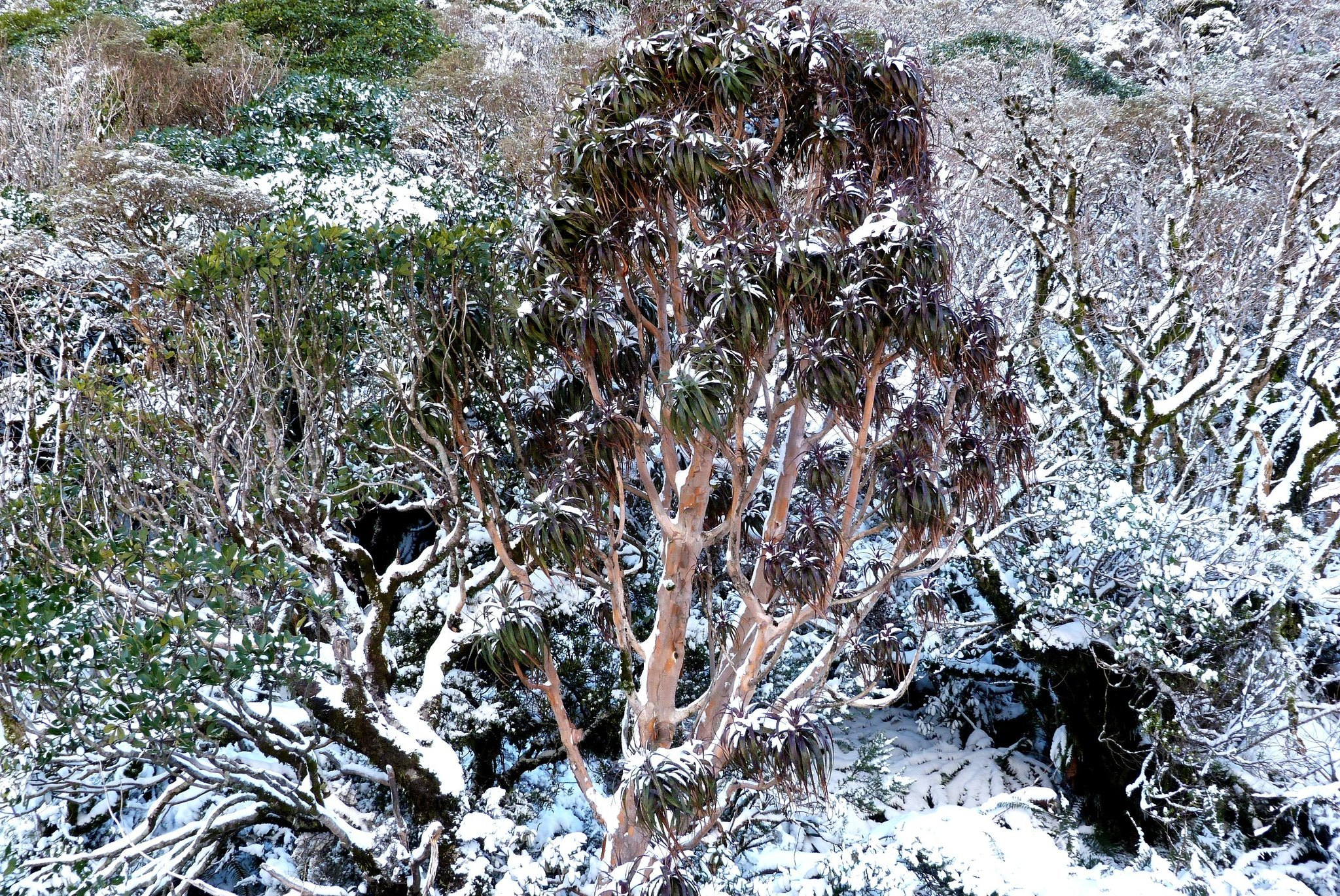
D. traversii covered in snow on Arthur's pass, where the first type specimen was taken.

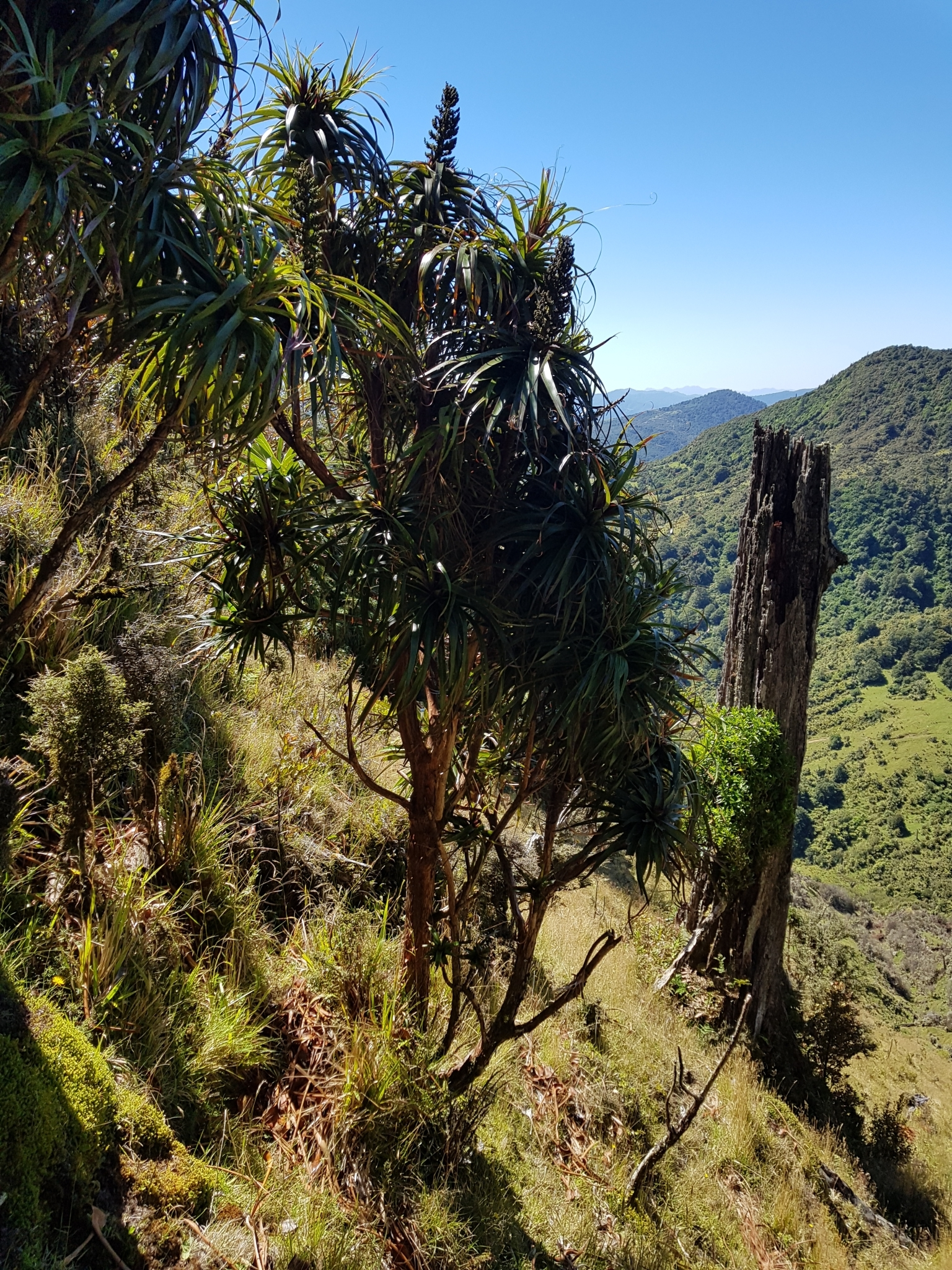
The northern form of D. traversii near Gisborne

== Distribution and habitat ==
Dracophyllum traversii is endemic to New Zealand and is found in both the North and South Islands. In the North Island it can be found from Waima Forest south to Taumarunui but also stretches east to the East Cape. It is also found in the Coromandel, Great and Little Barrier Islands, as well as areas in the Central volcanic Plateau. In the South, it is found in North-west Nelson down to Fiordland and Central Otago. It grows through a large vertical region, from sea level up to 1,768 m (5,801 ft) on 3–75 degrees steep gradients. Common areas it can be found on include: gorges, mountainsides, saddles, and cliffs. Full sun is preferred, though it will also grow in some shade. The New Zealand Threat Classification System classified it in 2023 as "Not Threatened," giving it an estimated population of at least 100,000.

Dracophyllum traversii inhabits lowland and subalpine shrubland, consisting of either simply Olearia lacunosa (lancewood tree daisy); or Olearia colensoi (tupare), D. longifolium (inaka), and Coprosma; or just Nothofagus menziesii (silver beech), as well as lowland and subalpine forests, made up of several types. These include: Nothofagus menziesii, Lepidothamnus intermedius (yellow silver pine), and Weinmannia racemosa (kāmahi) forest; or Nothofagus menziesii, Phyllocladus glaucus (toatoa), and Weinmannia racemosa forest; or Libocedrus plumosa (kawaka), Knightia excelsa (rewarewa), and Astelia fragrans (bush flax) forest; or Nothofagus menziesii, and Gahnia rigida (Gahnia) forest; or Phyllocladus alpinus (mountain toatoa) and Libocedrus bidwillii (pāhautea) forest. Soil types in these areas are made up of clay or clay loam from sandstone, limestone, graywacke or shale.

== Ecology ==
=== Pests ===
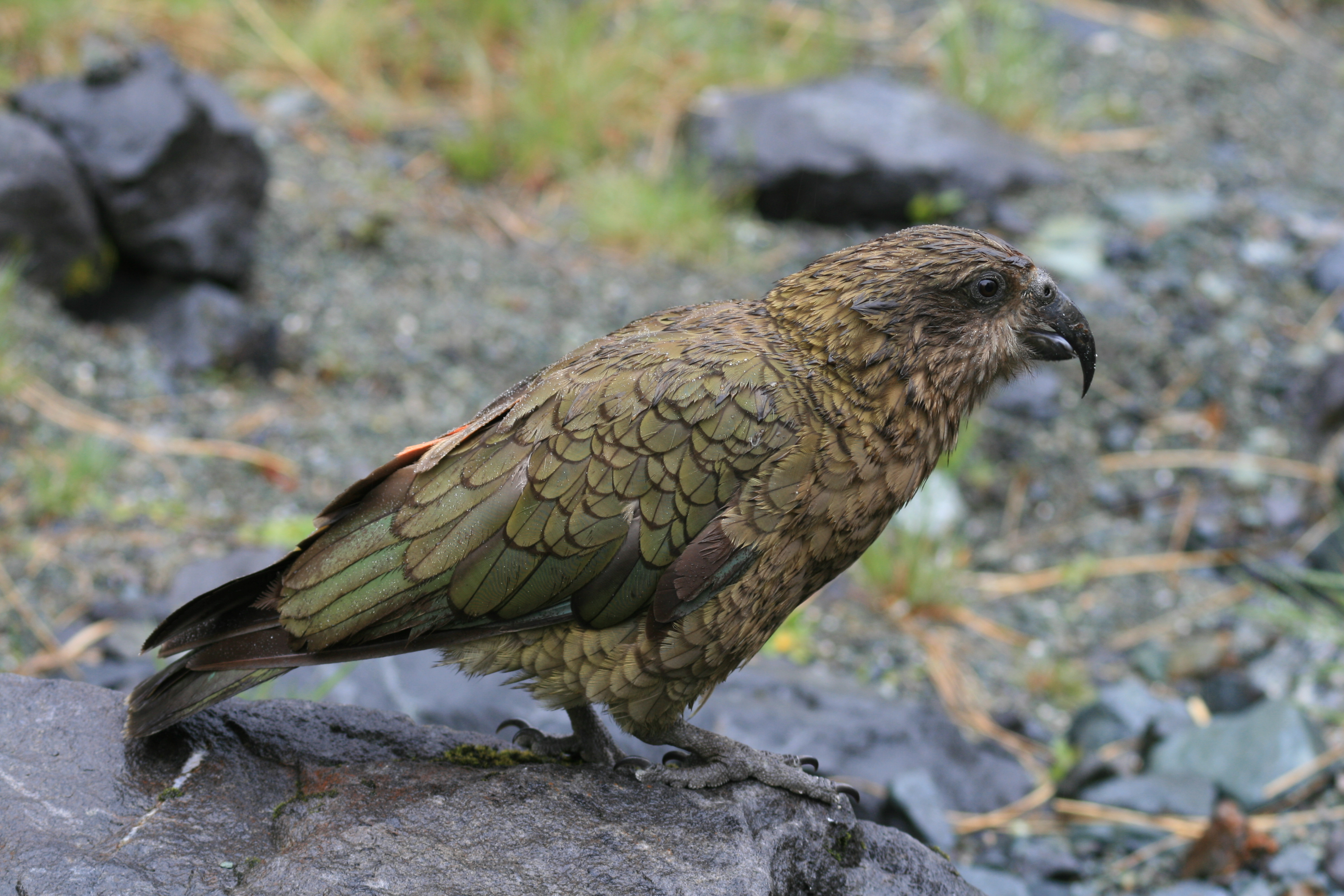
Nestor notabilis or the kea feeds on the young shoots and foliage.

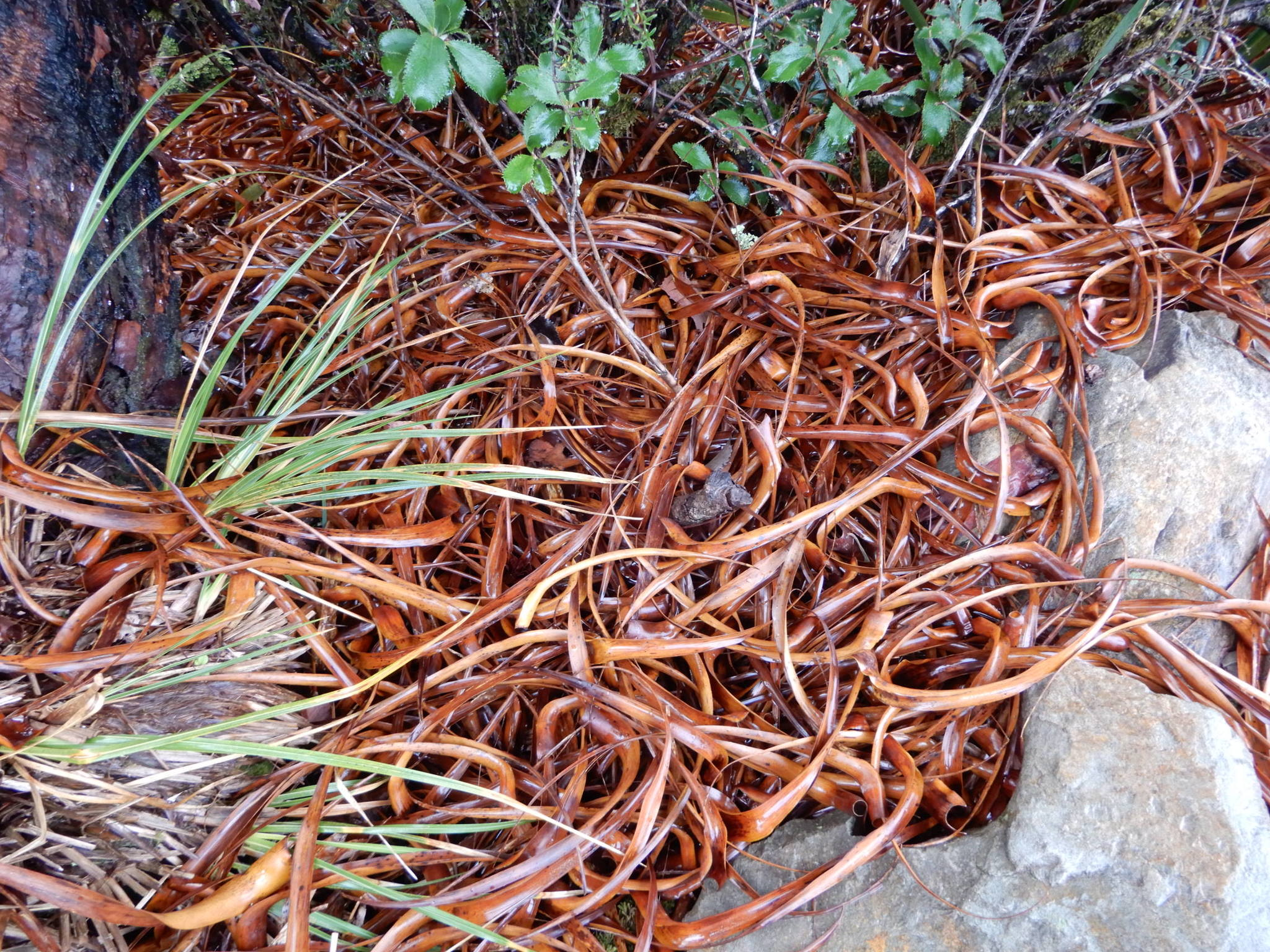
Dead leaves are used to suppress the growth of other plants.

The botanist Peter Haase conducted an ecological study, published in 1986, of D. traversii in Arthur's pass. Kea were found to feed on D. traversii during the winter, mainly eating the young foliage and shoot apices, which are also eaten by an unidentified larva. Scales in the genus Coelostomidia were identified laying their eggs under old bark and scars on leaves. The fruit, however, are almost not preyed upon at all, with only an estimated 0.01% eaten by larvae.

=== Phenology ===
The seeds are dispersed by wind, and although they are not specially adapted to do so, their low mass means that they can still travel a sufficient distance. Haase calculated that seeds from a height of 5 m (16 ft) and in a wind speed of 2 m/s (6.6 ft/s) would travel around 10 m (33 ft), so twice that of the height from which they were dispersed. Since each panicle contains around 2500 flowers, he estimated that each one produced 25,000 filled seeds, and a plant with a maximum of 30 of such panicles could hence produce 750,000 seeds. He also estimated that D. traversii has a lifespan of 500 – 600 years, while the juvenile stage takes between 100 and 150 years. It is deciduous, losing its leaves during the growing season, mainly from December through to March and has an average annual wood increment for adult trees of 0.4 – 0.49 mm and 0.6 – 0.9 mm for juvenile trees. Because it is deciduous the area under trees is often covered with leaf litter, in some places to 10 cm (4 in) or more deep, which prohibits the growth of other plants. Typically leaves are shed after six years and full growth takes 2 – 3 growing seasons, with each occurring from around September to April. Venter noted in his 2009 thesis that he had only observed one bird pollinating D. traversii, Anthornis melanura (the New Zealand bellbird), which was the first time any bird had been recorded doing so. Germination of seeds is generally sporadic, Haase managed to attain an 80% success rate and time of just 18 days, though only after 6–8 weeks of moist 4˚C storage. The seeds will not germinate without light.

== Cultivation ==
Dracophyllum traversii is best propagated from seed and needs a constantly moist soil, though will likely be very slow growing and difficult to establish. It grows best in a semi-shaded area in humus; plants that are collected in the wild generally perish a few months after being planted in cultivation.
