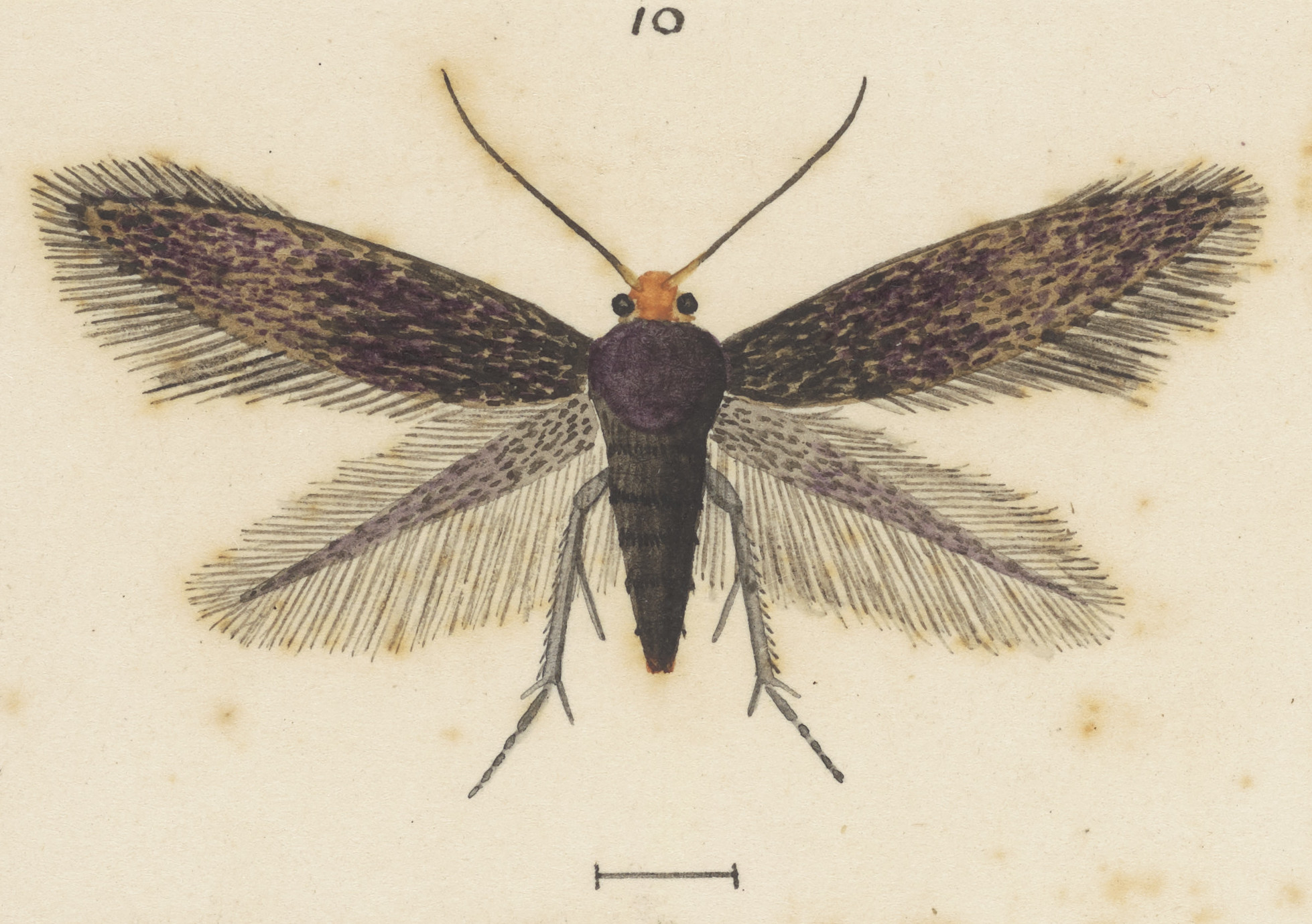

Scientific classification
- Kingdom: Animalia
- Phylum: Arthropoda
- Class: Insecta
- Order: Lepidoptera
- Family: Nepticulidae
- Genus: Stigmella
- Species: S. progonopis

Binomial name
- Stigmella progonopis (Meyrick, 1921)

Synonyms
- Nepticula progonopis Meyrick, 1921

= Stigmella progonopis =

Species of moth endemic to New Zealand

Stigmella progonopis is a moth of the family Nepticulidae. This species was first described by Edward Meyrick in 1921. It is endemic to New Zealand and has been observed in the North, South and Stewart Islands. This species inhabits montane to subalpine native forest and shrubland. Larvae are leaf miners and have been recorded from April to August. They feed on Dracophyllum traversii, Dracophyllum longifolium, Dracophyllum menziesii, Dracophyllum latifolium and Gaultheria crassa. Adults are on the wing in January and February and there is one generation per year.

== Taxonomy ==
S. progonopis was first described by Edward Meyrick in 1921 using a specimen collected by George Hudson on the main spur of Mount Arthur at the bush line at 4000 ft and originally named Nepticula progonopis. In 1928 George Hudson discussed and illustrated that species under that name in his book The butterflies and moths of New Zealand. In 1988 John S. Dugdale placed Nepticula ogygia in the genus Stigmella. In 1989 Hans Donner and Christopher Wilkinson agreed with this placement in their monograph on New Zealand Nepticulidae. This placement was again confirmed in a 2016 revision of the global species placed in the family Nepticulidae. The male holotype specimen is held at the Natural History Museum, London.

== Description ==
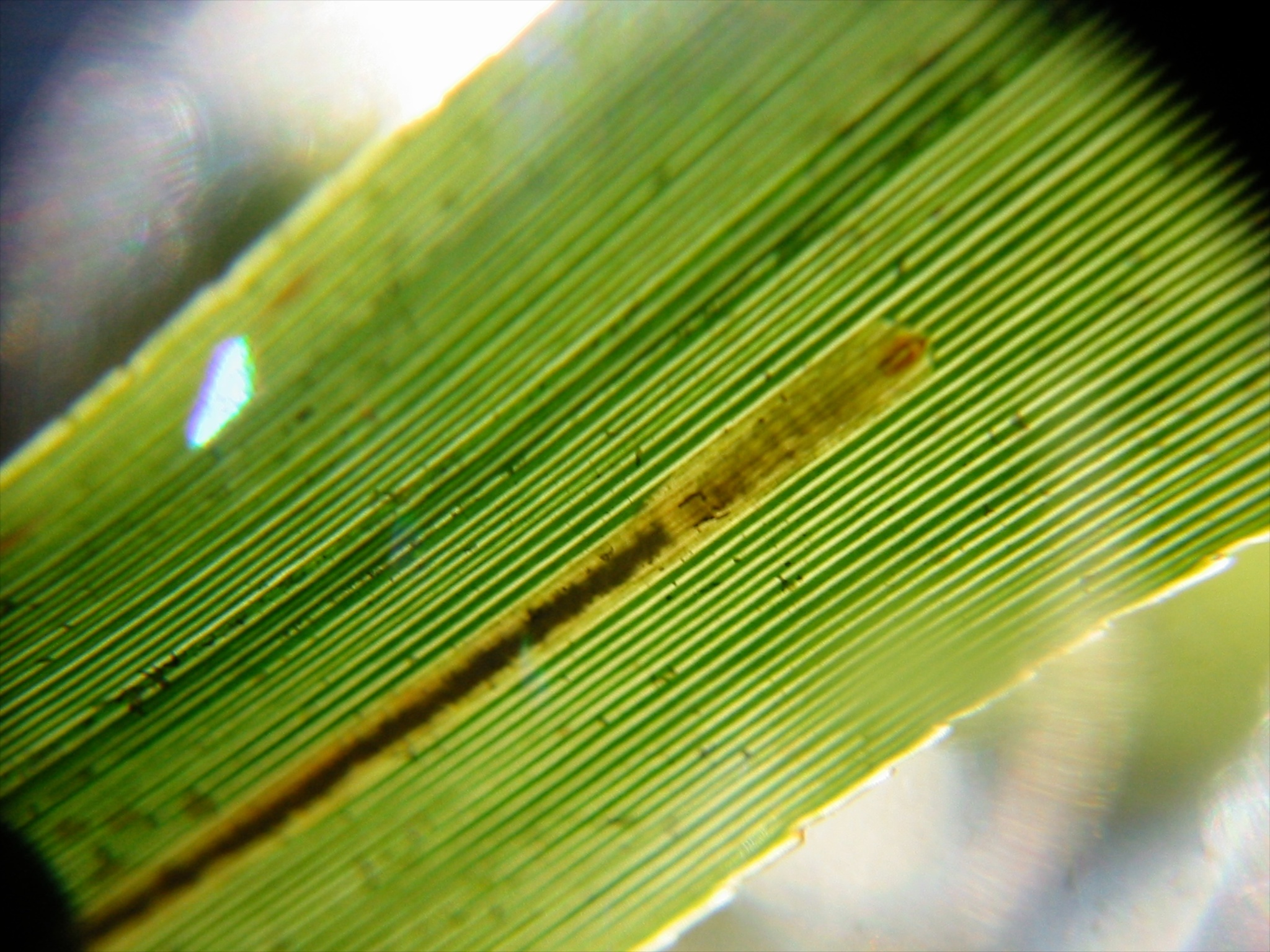
S. progonopis larva mining a Dracophyllum latifolium leaf.

The larvae of this species are coloured a pale yellow.

Donner and Christopher described the leaf mine of the larva of this species as follows:

Mine: long, linear galleries originating near leaf-base. When the larva reaches the apex of the leaf it crosses a leaf rib and eats its way back towards the egg site. Each mine is visible as a brown streak, and often there are several mines on one leaf.

The cocoon is made of brown coloured silk and is placed in between the tightly packed stalks of older leaves on the plant shoot.

Meyrick described the adult male of this species as follows:

♂. 6mm. Head deep orange. Antennae dark grey, eye-caps whitish. Thorax dark purple-grey, Abdomen dark grey. Forewings lanceolate; dark purple-grey: cilia grey, toward base mixed with dark purple-grey. Hindwings with frenulum long, simple; dark grey; cilia grey.

The female is similar in appearance to the male but is of smaller size.

== Distribution ==
This species is endemic to New Zealand. Other than its type locality this species has also been observed at Arthur's Pass, as well as at localities Fiordland, Otago, Southland and on Stewart Island. The mines of this species have been observed on Dracophyllum latifolium in the Waitākere Ranges in the Auckland region.

== Habitat and hosts ==
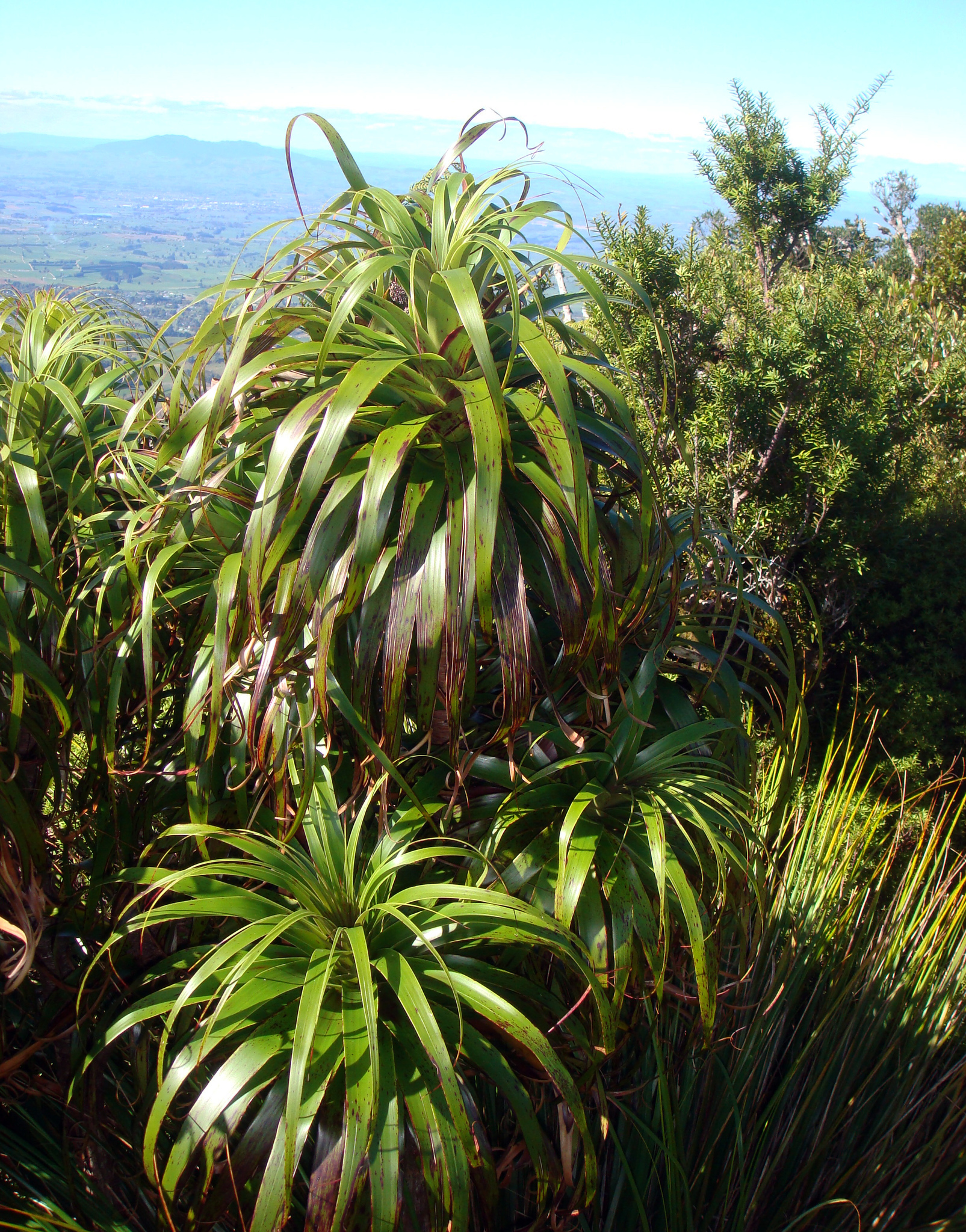
Larval host plant D. traversii.

This species inhabits montane to subalpine native forest and shrubland. The larvae are leaf miners and feed on Dracophyllum traversii, Dracophyllum longifolium, Dracophyllum menziesii, Dracophyllum latifolium and Gaultheria crassa.

== Behaviour ==
Larvae have been recorded from April to August. Adults have been recorded on the wing in January and February. There is one generation per year.
