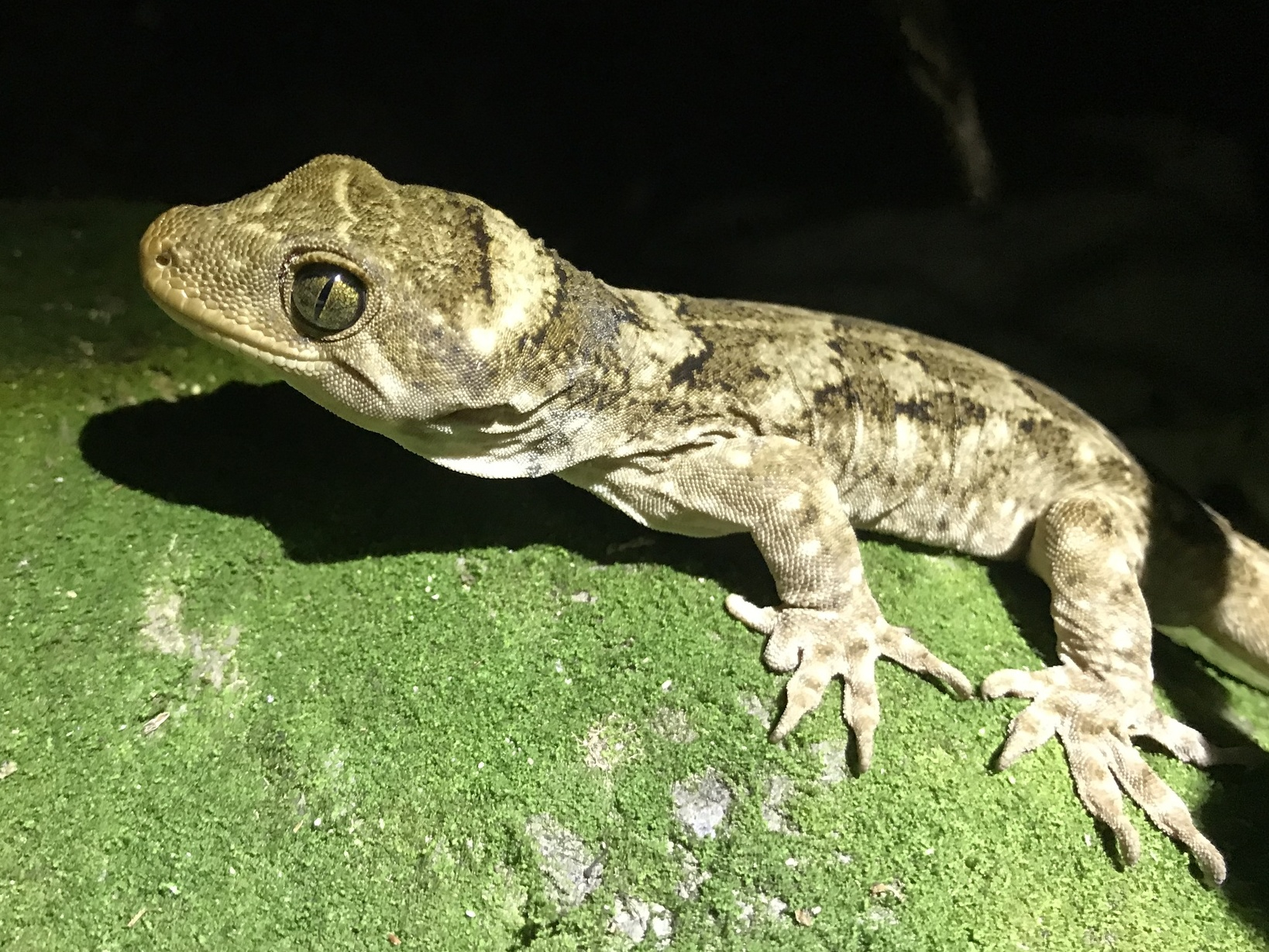
- Hoplodactylus tohu on Mana Island, New Zealand

Scientific classification
- Kingdom: Animalia
- Phylum: Chordata
- Class: Reptilia
- Order: Squamata
- Suborder: Gekkota
- Family: Diplodactylidae
- Genus: Hoplodactylus
- Species: H. tohu

Binomial name
- Hoplodactylus tohu Scarsbrook, Walton, Lawrence, & Hitchmough, 2023

= Hoplodactylus tohu =

Species of lizard

Hoplodactylus tohu, the Tohu gecko (Māori: mokomoko a Tohu), is a species of lizard of the family Diplodactylidae. The lizard is found in the Marlborough Sounds / Cook Strait area of New Zealand.

== Taxonomy ==
This species of gecko was described by University of Otago researchers led by Lachie Scarsbrook in 2023. Previously thought to be the same species as the Duvaucel's gecko, genetic testing revealed differences that justified erection of a new species.

Hoplodactylus tohu is one of two species in the genus Hoplodactylus; until 2023, the genus was thought to only contain Duvaucel's gecko (Hoplodactylus duvaucelii).

Tohu gecko can be distinguished from Duvaucel's gecko by several distinct features, with Tohu gecko being smaller once fully grown, has fewer digits, and longer claws.

== Etymology ==
The generic name Tohu gecko and the Māori name mokomoko a Tohu refer to the Te Ātiawa ancestor Tohu Kākahi. The Brothers Islands (Māori: Ngāwhatu Kai Ponu), where the largest extant population exists, falls under the regional tribal authority of Te Ātiawa.

== Distribution ==
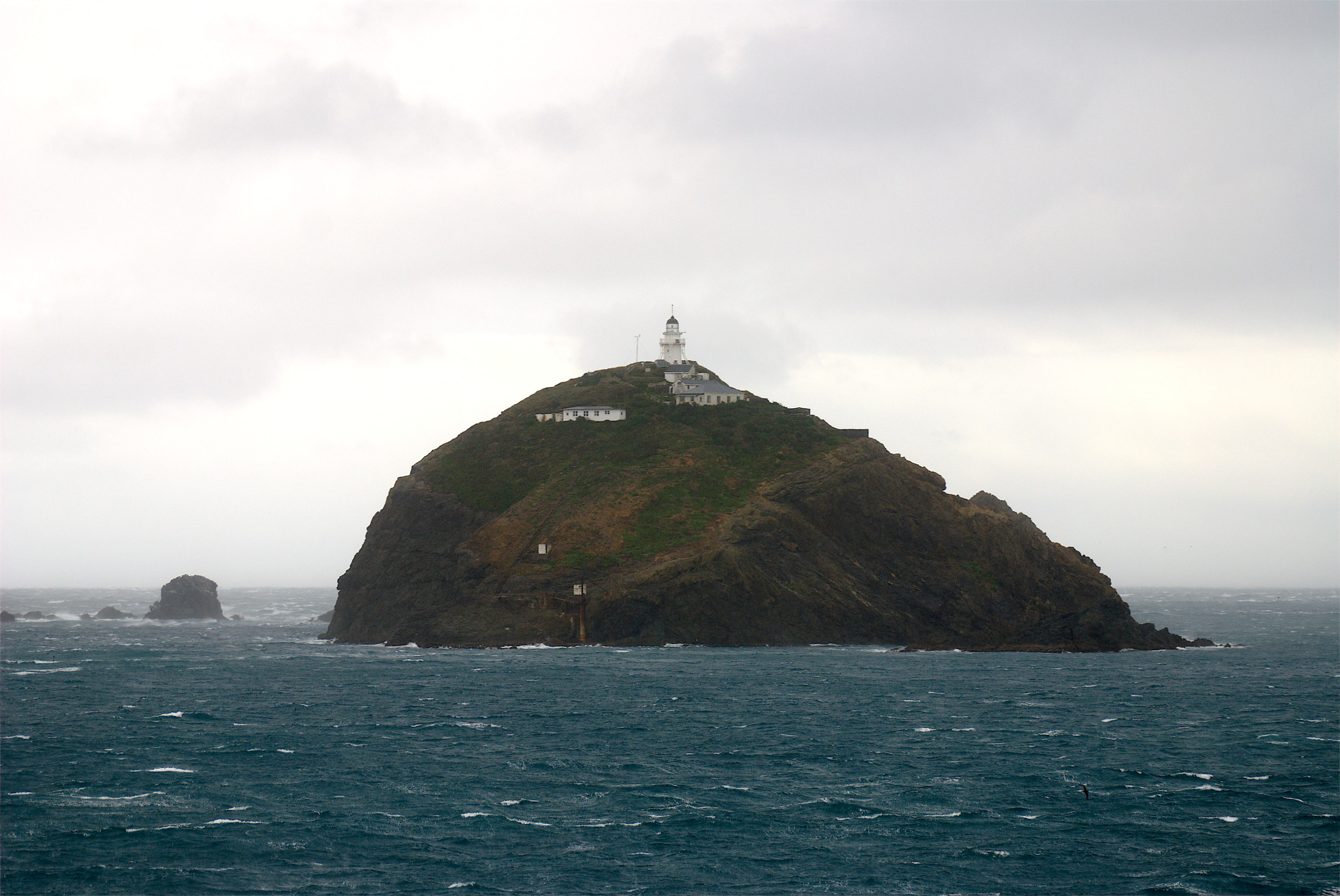
Brothers Island

Hoplodactylus tohu was formerly widespread on the main islands of New Zealand, but is currently only found on some islands in the northwestern Marlborough Sounds and Cook Strait. Currently the largest and most stable population of Tohu gecko is located on North Brother Island. A population of 40 of these geckos, thought at the time to be H. duvaucelii, were translocated in 1998 to Mana Island, where they have successfully established and bred.
