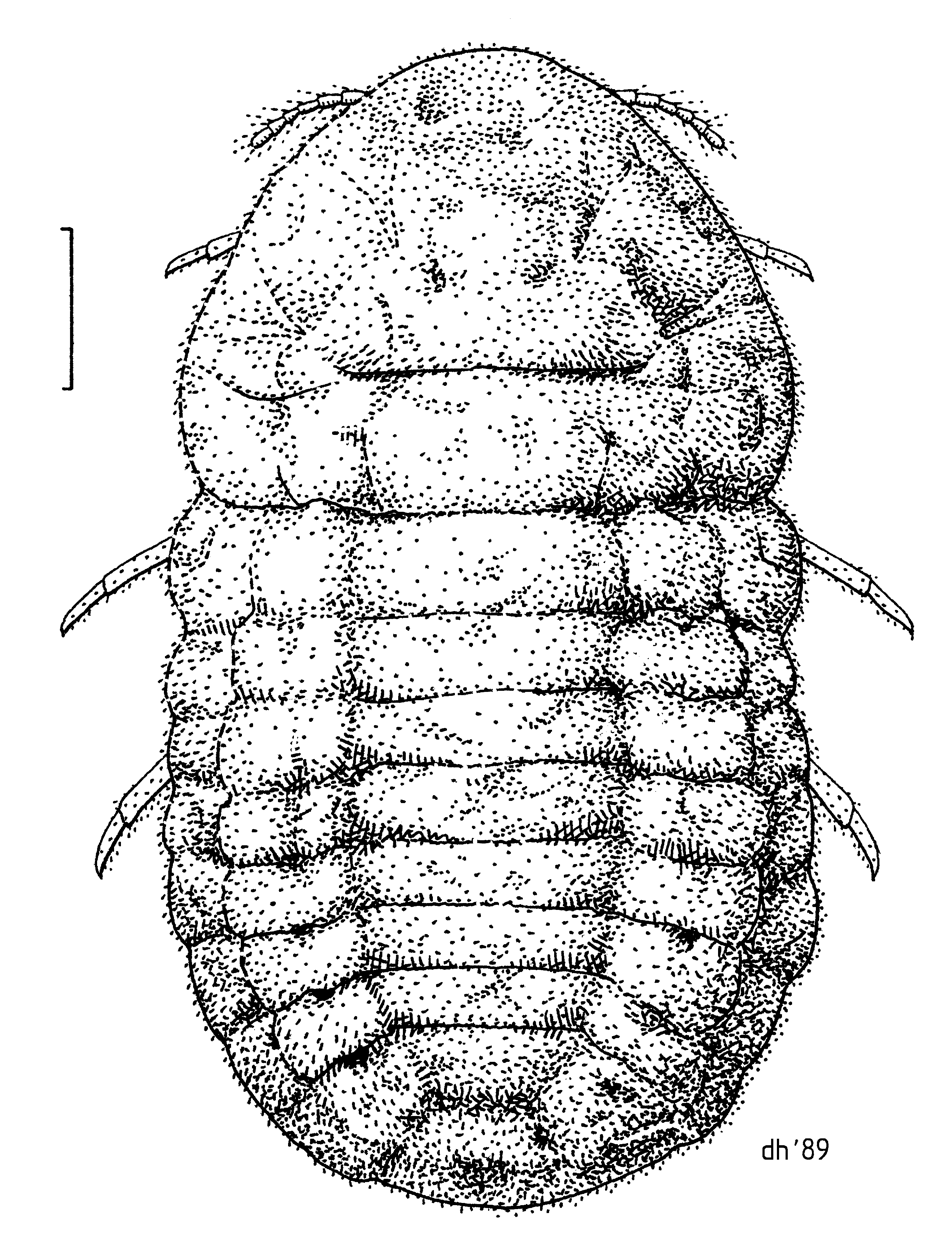
- Coelostomidia zealandica female, illustrated by Des Helmore

Scientific classification
- Kingdom: Animalia
- Phylum: Arthropoda
- Class: Insecta
- Order: Hemiptera
- Suborder: Sternorrhyncha
- Family: Coelostomidiidae
- Genus: Coelostomidia
- Species: C. zealandica

Binomial name
- Coelostomidia zealandica (Maskell, 1880)

Synonyms
- Coelostoma zealandica Maskell, 1880; Caelostoma zealandicum Maskell, 1884 (typographical error)

= Coelostomidia zealandica =

Species of true bug

Coelostomidia zealandica (common name: great giant scale) is a scale insect endemic to New Zealand. The female is notably larger and very different in appearance from the small winged male.

== Range ==
Coelostomidia zealandia is found on both the North and South Island of New Zealand.

== Description ==
This is a large scale insect, with the females reaching a length up to 15mm. There are at least three instar stages.

== Taxonomy ==
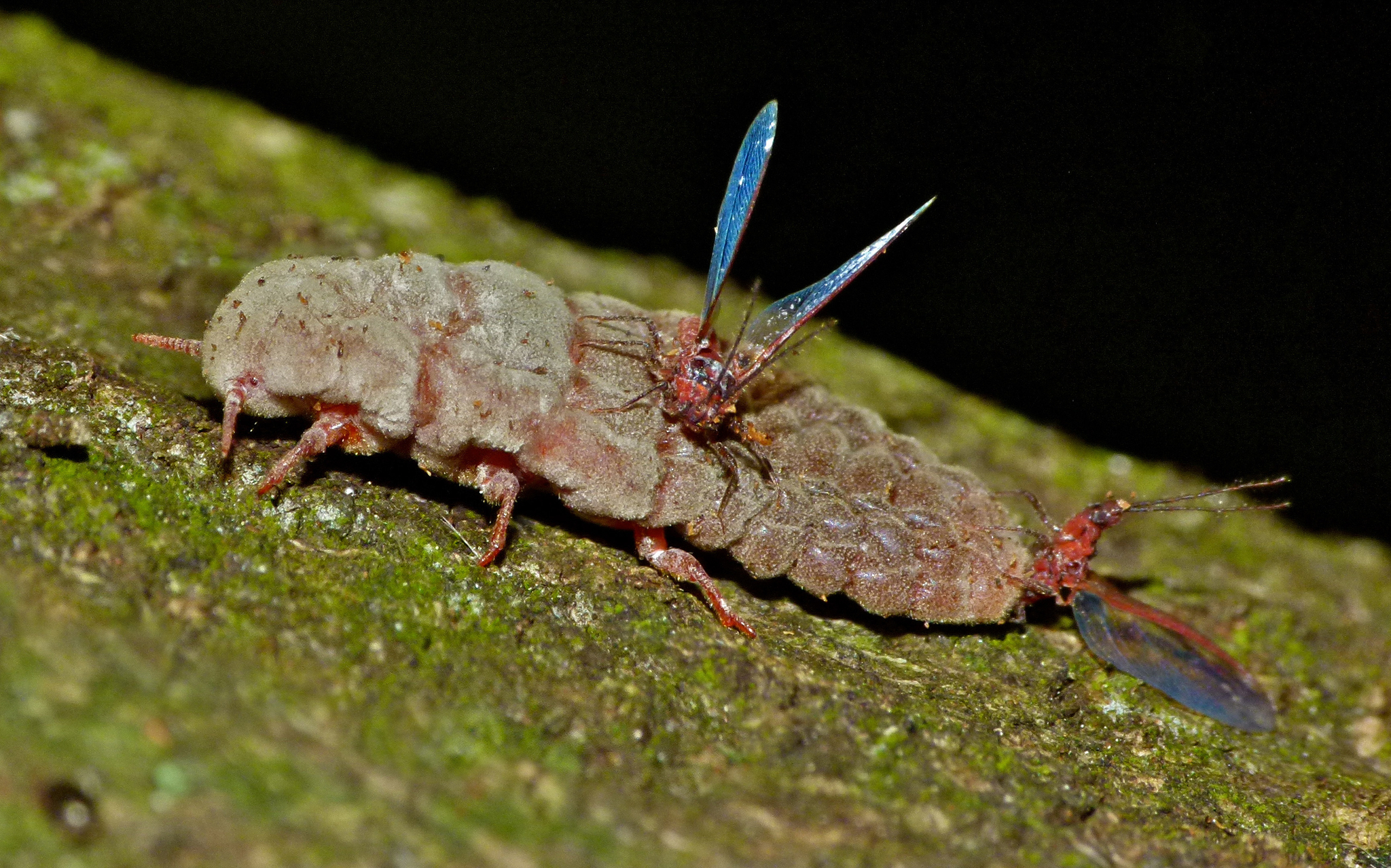
Male perched on female Coelostomidia zealandica

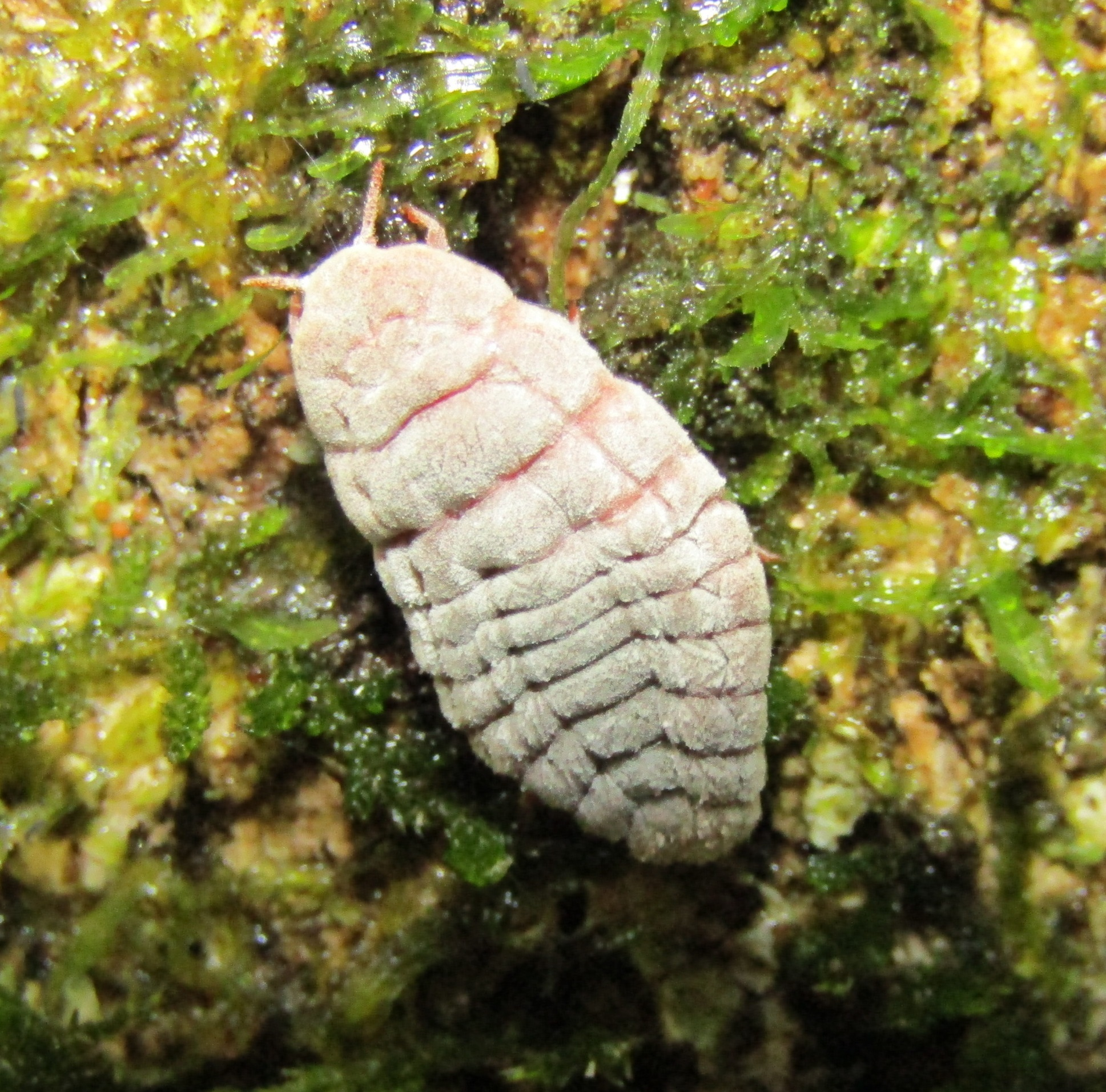
Female observed near Wellington, New Zealand

This species was described in 1880 by William Maskell as Coelostoma zealandica from specimens collected in Otago on the bark of trees, and Canterbury "buried in the ground and in the chinks of rocks, by the Sumner Road, Lyttelton, interspersed with another curious Coccid, feeding on Muehlenbeckia, a creeping plant growing thereabouts". The new genus name Coelostoma was later found to be already in use, and Cockerell in 1900 proposed the new genus Coelostomidia to replace it. C. zealandica was redescribed by Morrison & Morrison in 1922, who also provided a full diagnosis of Coelostomidia. The type specimens are now housed in the New Zealand Arthropod Collection, Landcare Research, Auckland.

== Ecology ==
=== Excretion of honeydew ===
C. zealandica feeds on sap and then excretes honeydew that is rich in sugar and provides a food source for birds, insects and lizards such as gecko. For example, the Duvaucel's gecko feeds on honeydew from ngaio trees (Myoporum laetum) that host a high density of scale insects. Trees infested with a large number of scale insects can become coated with a sooty mould - a black fungus complex.
