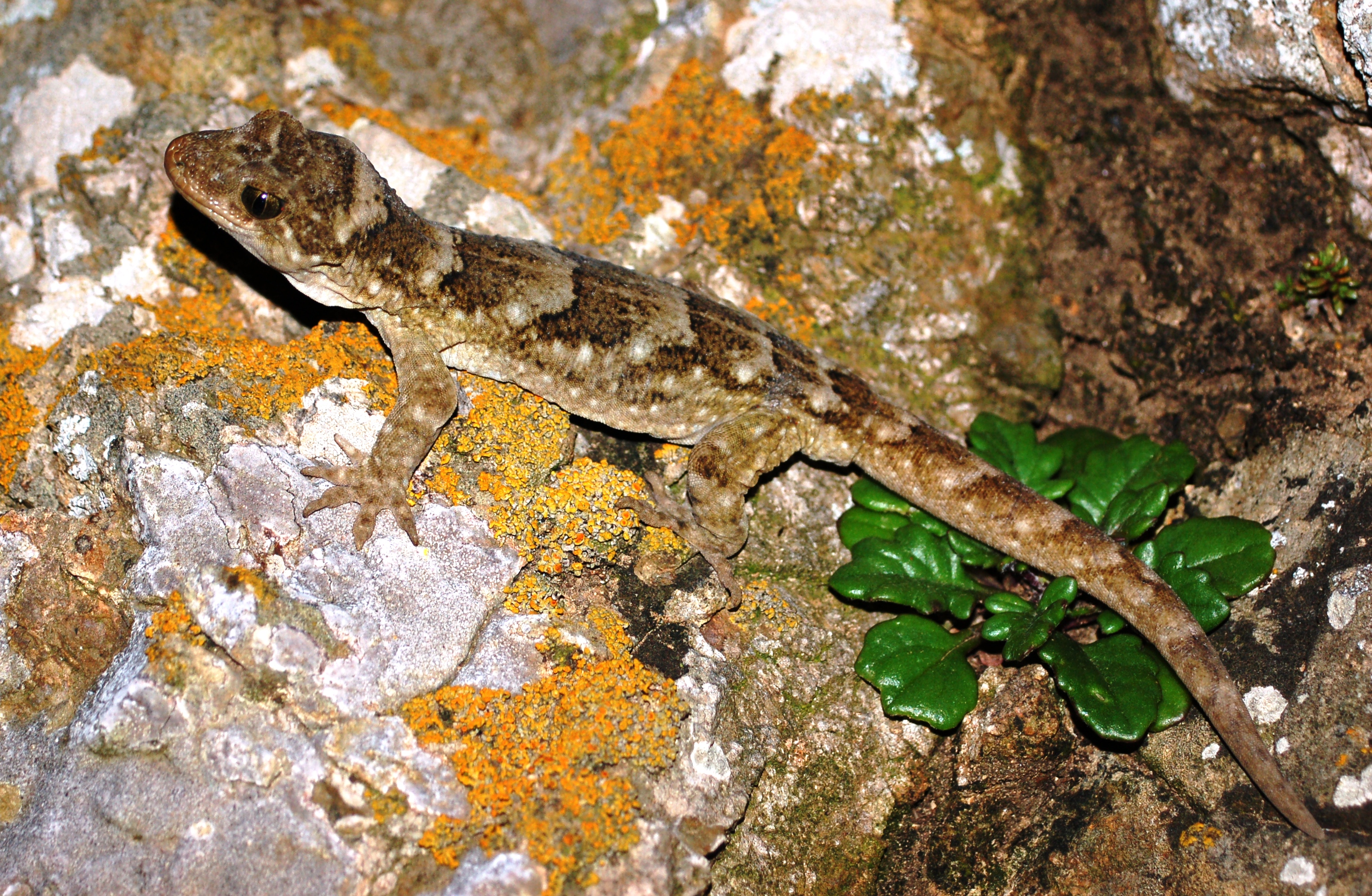
- Duvaucel's gecko (Hoplodactylus duvaucelii)

Scientific classification
- Kingdom: Animalia
- Phylum: Chordata
- Class: Reptilia
- Order: Squamata
- Suborder: Gekkota
- Family: Diplodactylidae
- Genus: Hoplodactylus; Fitzinger, 1843

Species
- See text

= Hoplodactylus =

Genus of lizards

Hoplodactylus is a genus of geckos in the family Diplodactylidae. The genus is endemic to New Zealand, one of the seven genera of geckos found only in New Zealand. Hoplodactylus comprises two species of large to gigantic brownish lizards.

== Description ==
Species in this genus (now split into several genera) tend to have rather dull colouration with little variation on a generally brown/grey theme, although mottled greens are seen in some species, notably the forest gecko (Mokopirirakau granulatus). The one exception to this rule of general drabness in colouration is the striking "herring boned" colour pattern of green, brown, black and white that is displayed by the "Harlequin Gecko" (Tukutuku rakiurae).

Although generally species of this genus cannot compete with those of Naultinus in terms of their vivid and beautiful colouration, Hoplodactylus species do have the ability to subtly change their skin colour pattern to give better camouflage, thus reducing the risk of predation. "In some of the Hoplodactylus species, the ability to change colour provides a supplementary method of thermoregulation"(*1). When basking in cold conditions they can darken their skin to increase the amount of heat absorbed and conversely they can lighten the shades in hot weather to reflect more light and keep cool. All species in this genus have more or less nocturnal activity patterns in contrast to the solely diurnal nature of Naultinus species and unlike species in the latter genus, are not purely arboreal and will forage on the ground.

Hoplodactylus species do not have prehensile tails and are thus generally less reluctant to drop them when disturbed by predators than species in the genus Naultinus.

Many species of the genus Hoplodactylus also have toes that are broader and more expanded than do their relatives in the genus Naultinus.

The key differences between New Zealand's two endemic gecko genera are summarised in the table below

| Hoplodactylus | Naultinus |
|---|---|
| Mainly grey-brown | Mainly green |
| Nocturnal | Diurnal |
| Terrestrial - sometimes on tree trunks | Arboreal: on foliage |
| Active-prey-searching | Sit-and-wait predator |
| Fast moving | Slow moving |
| Can change intensity of skin colour | Skin colour intensity cannot be changed |
| Wide, non-prehensile tails - readily shed | Narrow, tapering prehensile tails - reluctantly shed |
| Wider toe pad to assist climbing smooth surfaces in some species | Thin toe pads adapted for grasping twigs and foliage |

*references used for this table;

== Species ==
Hoplodactylus duvaucelii is the largest species of gecko remaining in New Zealand, although due to predation by introduced mammals such as the brown rat their confirmed range is at present largely restricted to pest-free offshore islands. However, in 2010 a Duvaucel's gecko was caught in a trap near Maungatautari, indicating that there are remnant populations on the New Zealand mainland. In 2023, the population of Hoplodactylus from islands in Cook Strait was determined to be a distinct species, Hoplodactylus tohu, which is believed to have formerly had a range across the South Island.

The extinct Hoplodactylus delcourti is the largest known gecko in the world. It was first described in 1986, though the only known specimen was collected in the early 19th century but was overlooked in a French museum for more than a century. However, it was later shown by genetic evidence to be nested within New Caledonian geckos, warranting its placement in the separate genus Gigarcanum, meaning that it is unlikely that the specimen originated in New Zealand, and thus was probably not the kawekaweau of Maori legend.

== Species list ==
- Duvaucel's gecko, Hoplodactylus duvaucelii
- Te mokomoko a Tohu, Hoplodactylus tohu
