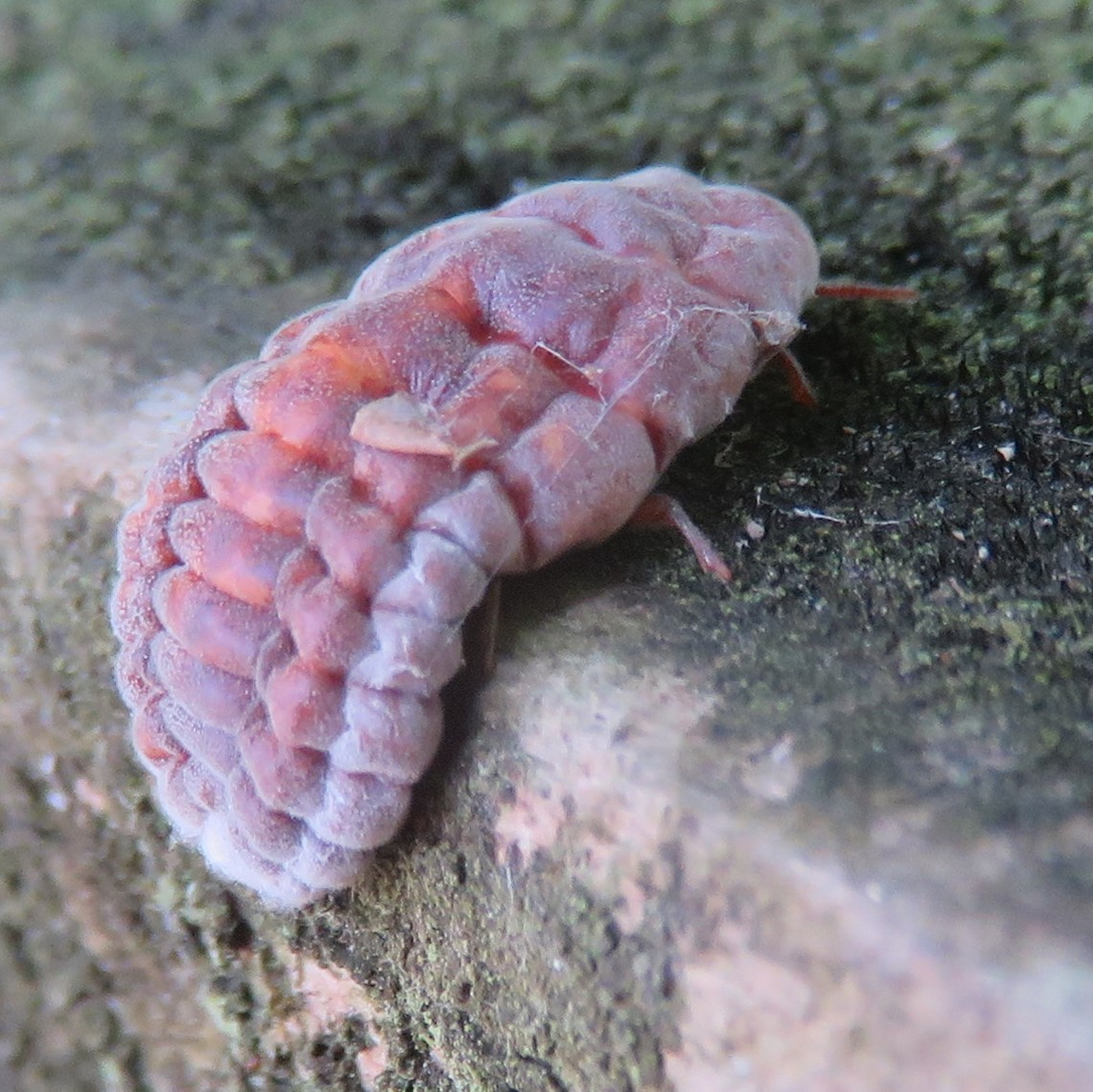
- Adult female Coelostomidia zealandica

Scientific classification
- Kingdom: Animalia
- Phylum: Arthropoda
- Class: Insecta
- Order: Hemiptera
- Suborder: Sternorrhyncha
- Infraorder: Coccomorpha
- Superfamily: Coccoidea
- Family: Coelostomidiidae; Morrison 1928

= Coelostomidiidae =

Family of true bugs

Coelostomidiidae is a family of scales and mealybugs in the order Hemiptera. There are about 5 genera and 11 described species in Coelostomidiidae.

== Genera ==
These genera belong to the family Coelostomidiidae:

- Coelostomidia Cockerell 1900
- Crambostoma Gavrilov-Zimin 2018
- Eremostoma Gavrilov-Zimin 2018
- † Cancerococcus Koteja, 1988
