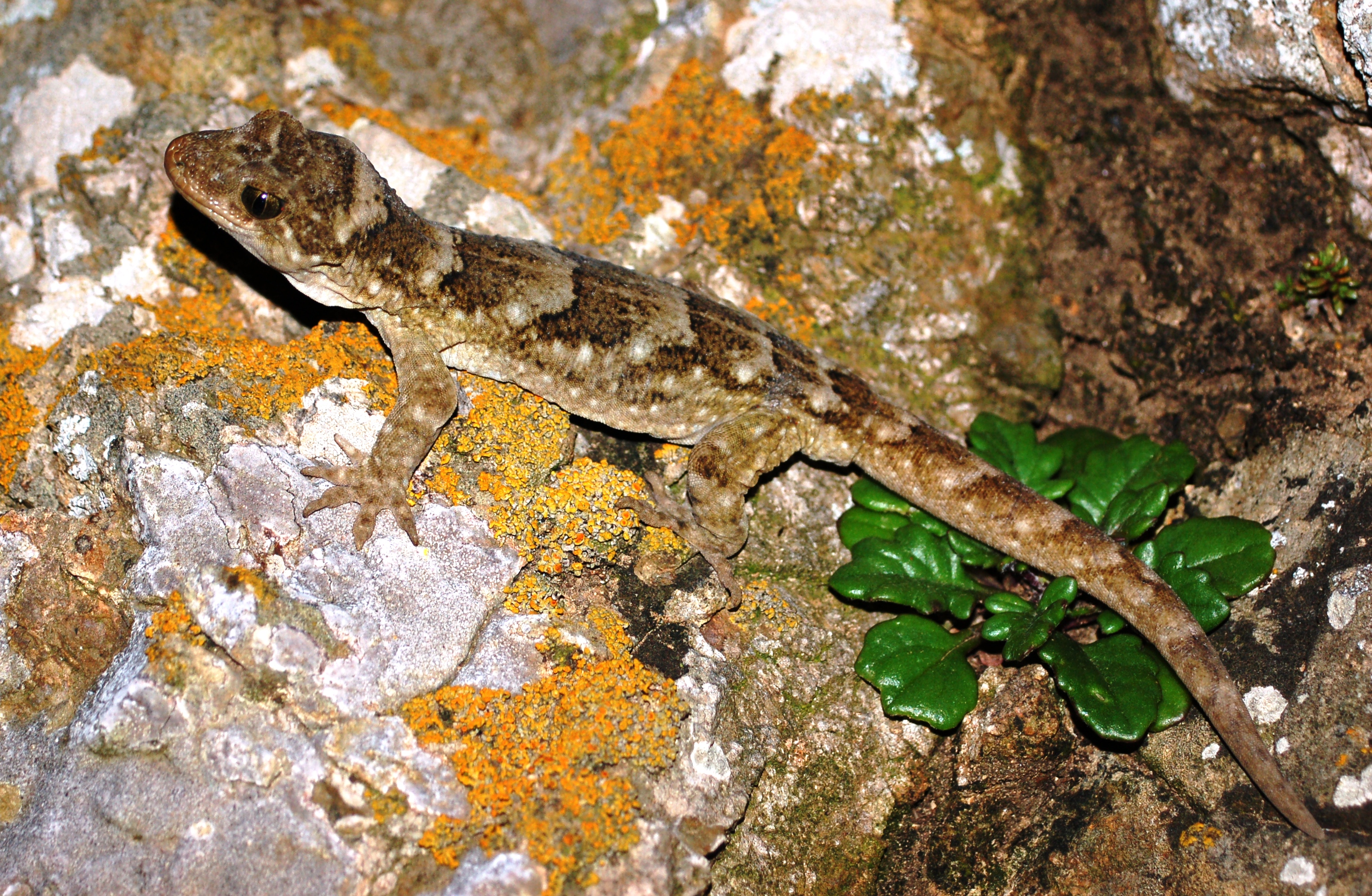

Conservation status
- Near Threatened (IUCN 3.1)
- CITES Appendix III

Scientific classification
- Kingdom: Animalia
- Phylum: Chordata
- Class: Reptilia
- Order: Squamata
- Suborder: Gekkota
- Family: Diplodactylidae
- Genus: Hoplodactylus
- Species: H. duvaucelii

Binomial name
- Hoplodactylus duvaucelii (A.M.C. Duméril & Bibron, 1836)
- Distribution of Duvaucel's gecko on the North Island map Known native range

Synonyms
- List: Platydactylus duvaucelii A.M.C. Duméril & Bibron, 1836; Hoplodactylus duvaucelii Fitzinger, 1843; Pentadactylus duvaucelii Gray, 1845; Hoplodactylus duvaucelii Boulenger, 1885; Naultinus duvauceli Chrapliwy, 1961; Woodworthia duvaucelii Jewell, 2008; Hoplodactylus duvaucelii Nielsen et al., 2011

= Duvaucel's gecko =

Species of reptile

Duvaucel's gecko (Hoplodactylus duvaucelii) is a species of lizard in the family Diplodactylidae. The species is endemic to New Zealand and regarded as 'at risk' by the New Zealand Department of Conservation (DOC) due to distribution limitations.

== Taxonomy ==
The species was first named Platydactyle de Duvacel or Platydactylus duvaucelii in 1836 by André Marie Constant Duméril and Gabriel Bibron, who named the species after Alfred Duvaucel, a French naturalist who explored India. The pair believed that the specimens were collected by Duvaucel when exploring Bengal as the museum specimens taken to Europe had been credited to him, and only later were the animals found to have come from New Zealand. In 1843 Leopold Fitzinger described the genus Hoplodactylus and named Duvaucel's gecko as the type species for this genus, leading to the currently used binomial name.

== Description ==
H. duvaucelii is the largest extant gecko species in New Zealand. The body measures 160mm snout-to-vent length (SVL) and approximately 30cm total, including the tail, weighing up to 120g. Lifespan in the wild is estimated at 50 years, while in captivity this is lower at over 40 years. Duvaucel's gecko is a heavy-bodied lizard with a relatively large head and long toes with expanded pads. Its colouration is mainly grey, often with a faint olive-green hue. Usually, irregular blotches lie across the body from side to side between the back of the head and the base of the tail, which is never striped. The front feet are smaller than those at the back. Foot area correlates with the SVL measurement, increasing as body size does at both the front and back feet.

== Reproduction ==
Duvaucel's gecko is likely a polygynandrous species. The mating period is between September and October. Viviparous juveniles are born after a 5-8 month gestation period during February and May. Maturity is reached at seven years of age, and after this period juveniles will be birthed annually or biannually. One juvenile is produced during each reproductive cycle, though a maximum of two offspring has been known to occur. This correlates with a low annual reproductive output compared to other New Zealand gecko species. Little parental care input is made by the parents towards juveniles as they are mostly independent after birth, however inside of the body viviparity provides better incubation conditions upon juveniles from the mother. Female individuals experience hormonal changes during the pre-ovulatory period, exhibiting increased oestradiol and progesterone compared with nonreproductive females.

Courtship includes physical and chemosensory behaviour by both sexes. Males initiate courtship rituals by approaching the female and displaying tongue flicks. He will touch his snout to the female's head, dorsal surface, and cloacal area and bite upon her body. The female individual will respond in defence with tail displays including flicks and thrashes, and biting the male. Upon this behaviour, the male will initiate the courtship grip, and if interested, the female will stiffen her body in the courtship pose and cease tail displays. Otherwise, the female will move away from the male and seek refuge. A rejected male will act aggressively towards the female and guard the entrance to her refuge site in an enlarged stance with arched back posture and extended legs. Mating begins when the male positions himself atop the female, join tails with the female, and inserts the hemipenis into the cloaca. Copulation then proceeds for approximately 14 minutes before hemipenis extraction and separation of individuals to seek refuge.

== Diet ==
Duvaucel's gecko is an opportunistic omnivore, relying on sugar resources in its diet from fruit, nectar, and honeydew, but also occasionally consuming invertebrates. It also consuumes insects, arachnids, and smaller reptiles. Honeydew is an annual resource, versus seasonal production of flowers and fruit and varied opportunities of predation events. It forages both on the ground and arboreally in scrub, forest, and shoreline habitats in localised sites.

Duvaucel's gecko prefers fruit from kawakawa (Piper excelsum), karamū (Coprosma robusta), and shrubby tororaro (Muehlenbeckia astonii) species. Individuals will consume only ripe fruiting bodies, foraging both in plants and below them. Frugivory can contribute to the dispersal of the consumed plant species, though this is dependent on seed retention time in the gut. Adult individuals have a greater seed retention time than juveniles, excreting waste after multiple days and displaying the ability to disperse seeds away from the parent plant effectively. There is a significantly lower retention time for non-native plants than native plants. Observation of individuals repeatedly at the same location could suggest localised feeding over time until a resource is exhausted, decreasing the effectiveness of dispersal behaviour when fruit resources are high.

Ngaio (Myoporum laetum) infested with high densities of honeydew-producing scale insects, namely endemic Coelostomidia zealandica, is a favoured resource over other insect-infested plant species. Nectivorous feeding behaviour occurs by foraging along stems and foliage until a flower is located, then through an arching neck motion pushing the snout into the nectar repository of the flower. This contributes to the dispersal of pollen for ngaio as well as pōhutukawa (Metrosideros excelsa) as it is captured on the throat whilst feeding. Direct licking of honeydew droplets off plant stems is another method of obtaining this resource. Adult Duvaucel's gecko are present in large amounts at heavily infested ngaio trees, whereas juveniles are more commonly located on trees with lower densities of honeydew. Body size may therefore influence resource selection behaviour, displacing smaller individuals to lower-resource areas as a means of competition.

== Geographic range and habitat ==
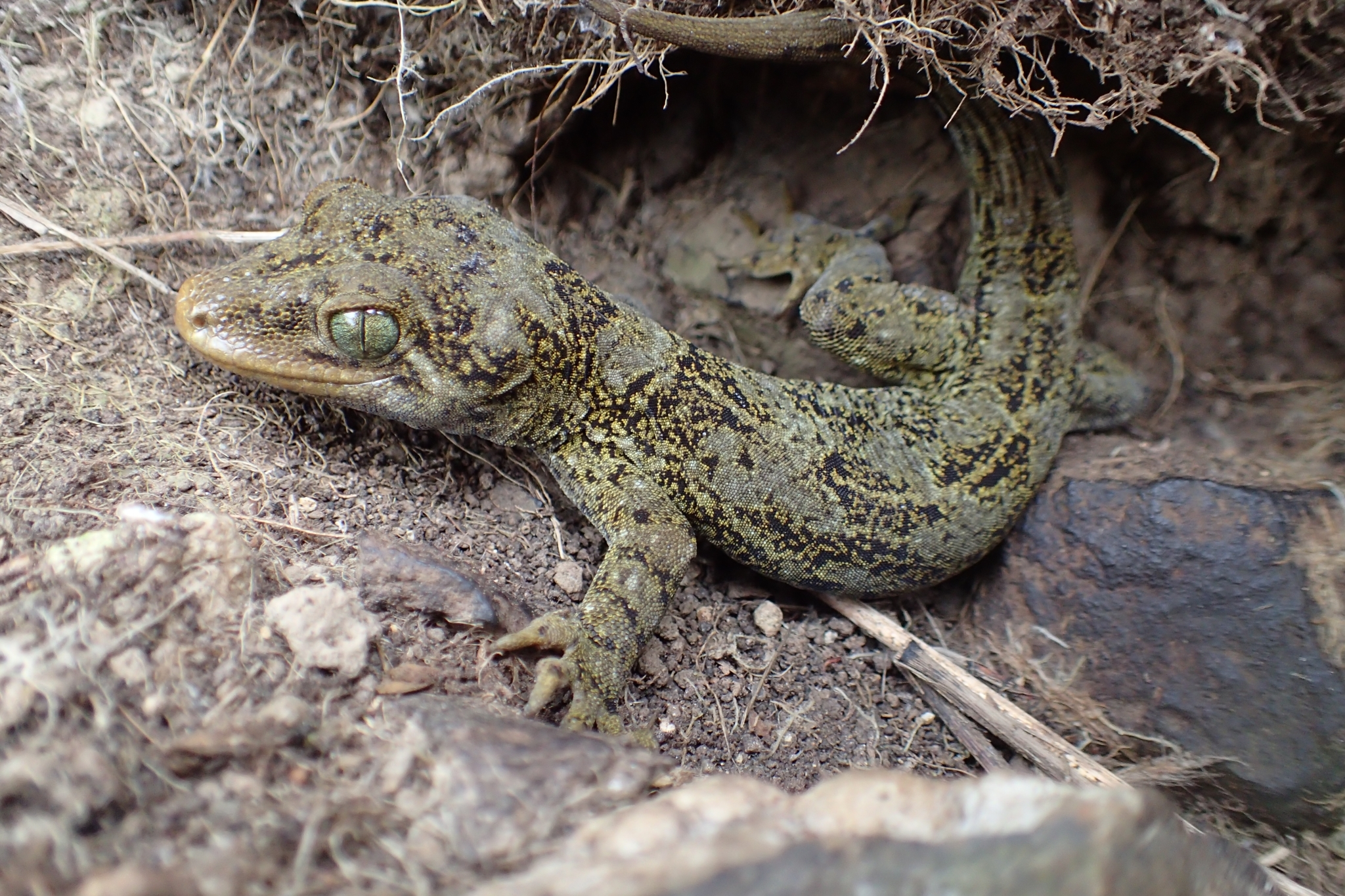
Duvaucel's gecko in a rocky area of the Hen and Chicken Islands

Subfossil and genetic evidence suggests that Duvaucel's gecko were once found throughout the New Zealand mainland. During Polynesian and later European colonisation of New Zealand, human induced habitat loss and predation by the kiore, the Polynesian rat (Rattus exulans), restricted the Duvaucel's gecko range to predator free or controlled offshore island sites. H. duvaucelii are mostly located on 11 New Zealand offshore island sites in the Cook Strait (Mana Island and North Brother Island) and across the eastern coast of the North Island (including Great Barrier Island, Poor Knights Island, Motuora Island, and Tiritiri Matangi).

Population partitioning of these two island groups has been observed, with individuals exhibiting a larger size on the Cook Strait Island subpopulations compared to the Northern Island subpopulations.

Conservation work has aided in range expansion via the translocation of populations, including the 2016 reintroduction of 80 individuals to the mainland at predator free Tawharanui Open Sanctuary on the Tawharanui Peninsula. Individuals have also been translocated to the Massey University captive breeding program in Auckland.

Duvaucel's gecko are habitat generalists, occupying lowland forests, tussock vegetation, and coastal cliffs.

Range overlap on offshore islands with predator species, particularly tuatara (Sphenodon punctatus) and kiore, has induced behavioural changes in the Duvaucel's gecko. Overall, increased cryptic behaviour has been observed by Duvaucel's gecko in the presence of these species. Tuatara are also a nocturnal species with similar habitat and diet to Duvaucel's gecko, leading to resource competition and exclusion during nighttime foraging. Duvaucel's gecko have adapted to this competitive stressor through temporal avoidance behaviour, foraging later into the night when tuatara are less active. High site fidelity of Duvaucel's gecko is a cause of increased aggression with territorial tuatara individuals. Likewise, interaction and predation pressure by kiore has led to spatial avoidance at the microhabitat scale. For example, Duvaucel's geckos are shifting microhabitats to more open spaces, occupying arboreal habitat higher up the forest strata, or becoming excluded from the forest altogether and occupying shoreline and coastal cliff regions. By occupying different spatial and temporal ranges, Duvaucel's gecko can reduce predation risk and competition enforced by predatory species.

In addition to habitat behaviour, predatory species presence has negative consequences for population metrics. Recruitment is restricted due to high predation on naïve juvenile individuals, causing long term conservation concerns for the Duvaucel's gecko. Increased cryptic behaviour causes difficulty in population monitoring as individuals are less active and occupy changing habitats. Small populations are especially vulnerable, as they are limited in future recruitment possibilities and restricted to less genetic variation.

== Social behaviour ==
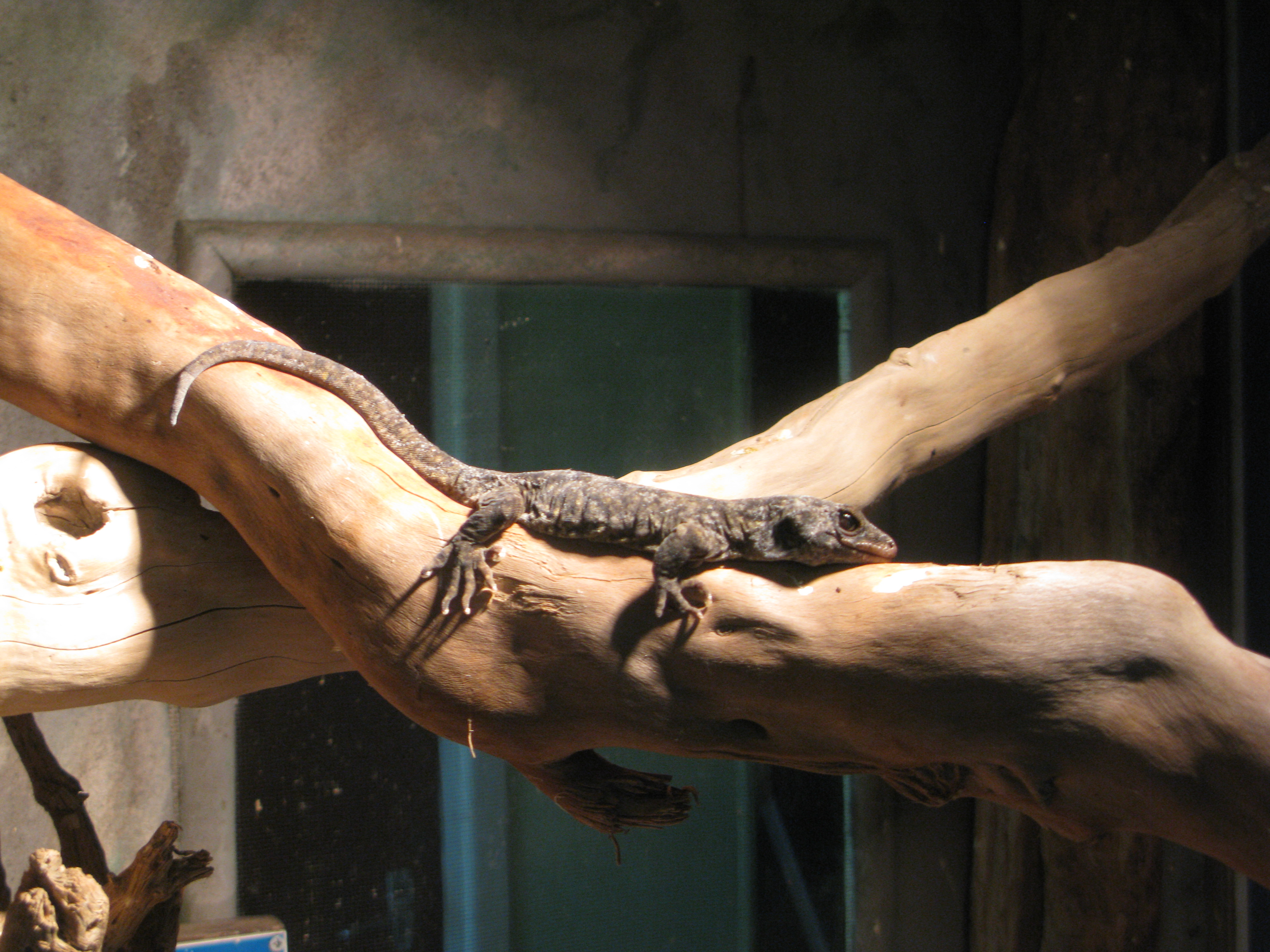
Duvaucel's gecko basking under a light.

Duvaucel's gecko are a highly social species. They show high site fidelity and maintain social groups by seeking refuge in social aggregations. Sun basking behaviour is performed throughout the day for temperature regulation. Chemosensory identification is used to communicate with conspecific individuals.

High site fidelity is reflected in the shared exploitation of local resources, including food and shelter sites. This enables the building of sociality between individuals of a local population through familiarity.

Year round diurnal social aggregations are formed as refuge throughout the day. Groups of 2-8 individuals will aggregate together throughout the day in secluded areas, including rock crevices, tree hollows, or ground vegetation. Aggregations will always have only one male present, with the other individuals compoased of females and their juvenile offspring. Aggregation groups will often remain the same but are tolerant of incoming individuals provided there is space and they are not of the male sex. This enforces social familiarity between aggregate groups, as well as provides evidence for kin sociality because of tolerance of adults for juvenile individuals. Aggregations are not compulsory for thermoregulation, but may have mating benefits for males. Aggregation-forming males are larger than their solo counterparts, indicating female guarding or male competition benefits during the breeding season.

Scent communication is carried out by marking sites and later identification by a conspecific individual. Snout rubbing or cloacal dragging across a resource marks the site with hormones, identified via tongue flicking behaviour that carries the scent into the highly developed olfactory system. This form of communication is used in male competition, mating opportunities, between juveniles and mothers, as well as the recognition of an unknown conspecific in the area.

== Conservation efforts ==
Past conservation of the Duvaucel's gecko has primarily focused on translocation and predator-free regimes to increase population growth. Translocations to the Massey University Reptile Facility captive breeding program have led to successful translocations since 2006, as well as study into the species. An early study found that H. duvaucelii is well suited for captive breeding due to non-chronic elevation of stress related hormones in captive individuals.

Individual and population sampling methods are focal points of conservation literature to better understand population metrics of this cryptic species. Artificial retreats formed of tree trunk coverings have been shown to increase population monitoring in the early post-translocation period, mimicking natural aggregation sites to encourage localised dispersal. Radiotelemetry methods using backpack devices are effective in tracking movement and habitat use of Duvaucel's gecko individuals. Additionally, footprint tracking enables population density and age estimates of the species, as well as wider habitat use.

Parasitic associations have been found, including that of vector Geckobia naultina, which aggregate at the periphery of the eyes and cause a Rickettsia-like parasite in the blood.

Future conservation concerns lie in climate change effects on islands, such as further range decrease. Predator control is critical to enabling the long term survival of this species.

== See also ==
- Geckos of New Zealand
