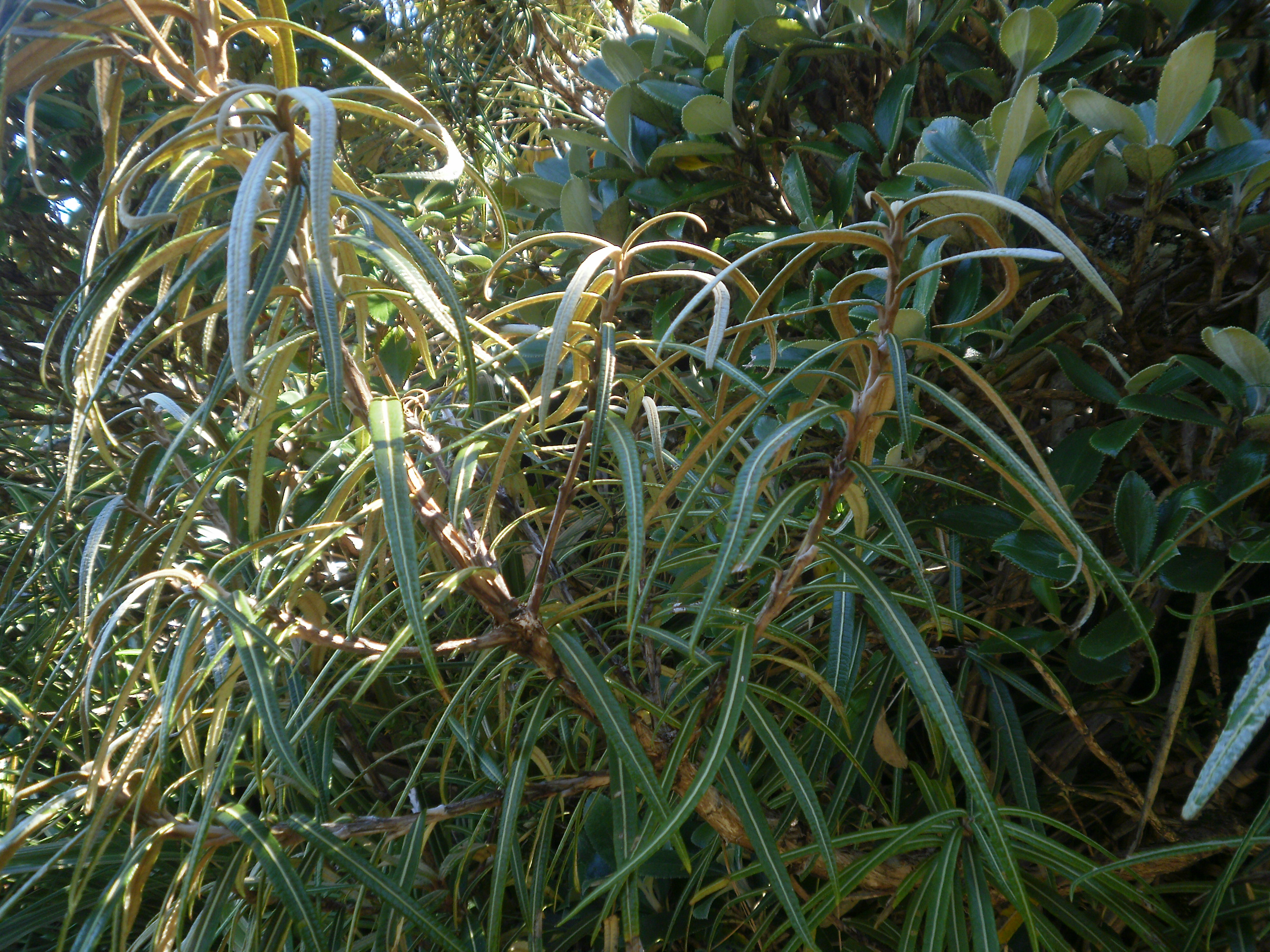

Scientific classification
- Kingdom: Plantae
- Clade: Tracheophytes
- Clade: Angiosperms
- Clade: Eudicots
- Clade: Asterids
- Order: Asterales
- Family: Asteraceae
- Genus: Olearia
- Species: O. lacunosa

Binomial name
- Olearia lacunosa Hook.f

= Olearia lacunosa =

Species of tree

Olearia lacunosa, commonly known as the lancewood tree daisy, is a lowland to sub-alpine shrub or small tree, native to New Zealand. It grows from the lower North Island, southwards along mainly the west coast of the South Island.

Olearia lacunosa can grow up to 5 metres high and has long narrow leaves that are dark green above and brown underneath.
