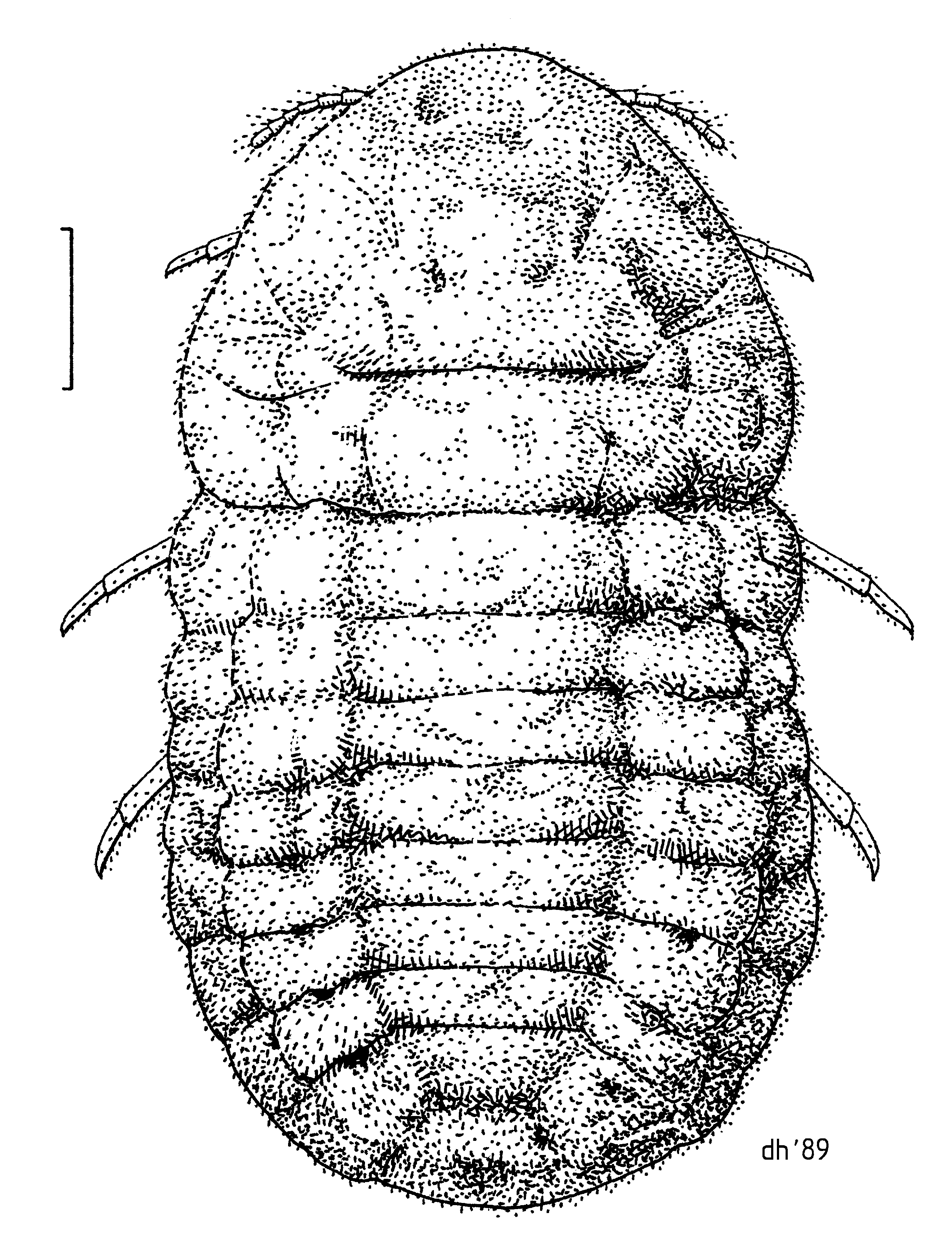
- Female Coelostomidia zealandica by Des Helmore
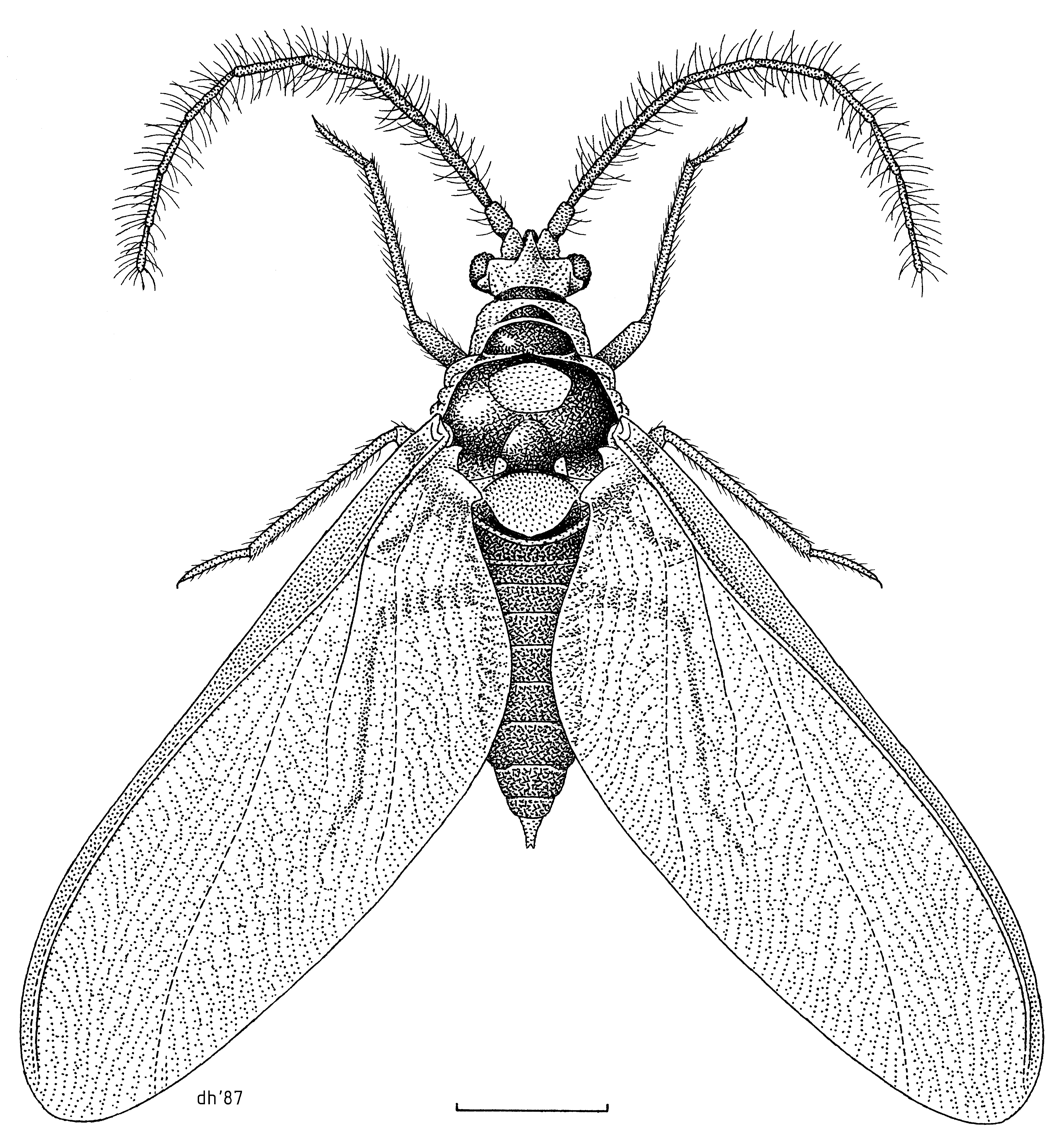
- Male Coelostomidia wairoensis by Des Helmore

Scientific classification
- Kingdom: Animalia
- Phylum: Arthropoda
- Clade: Pancrustacea
- Class: Insecta
- Order: Hemiptera
- Suborder: Sternorrhyncha
- Family: Coelostomidiidae
- Genus: Coelostomidia (Maskell, 1880)

Species
- See text

Synonyms
- Caelostoma Maskell, 1884; Coelostoma Maskell, 1880; Coelostomidea MacGillivray, 1921

= Coelostomidia =

Genus of true bugs

Coelostomidia is a genus of true bugs belonging to the family Coelostomidiidae. The species of this genus are endemic to New Zealand.

Species:

- Coelostomidia deboerae Morales, 1991
- Coelostomidia jenniferae Morales, 1991
- Coelostomidia montana Green, 1929
- Coelostomidia pilosa (Maskell, 1891)
- Coelostomidia wairoensis (Maskell, 1884)
- Coelostomidia zealandica (Maskell, 1880)
