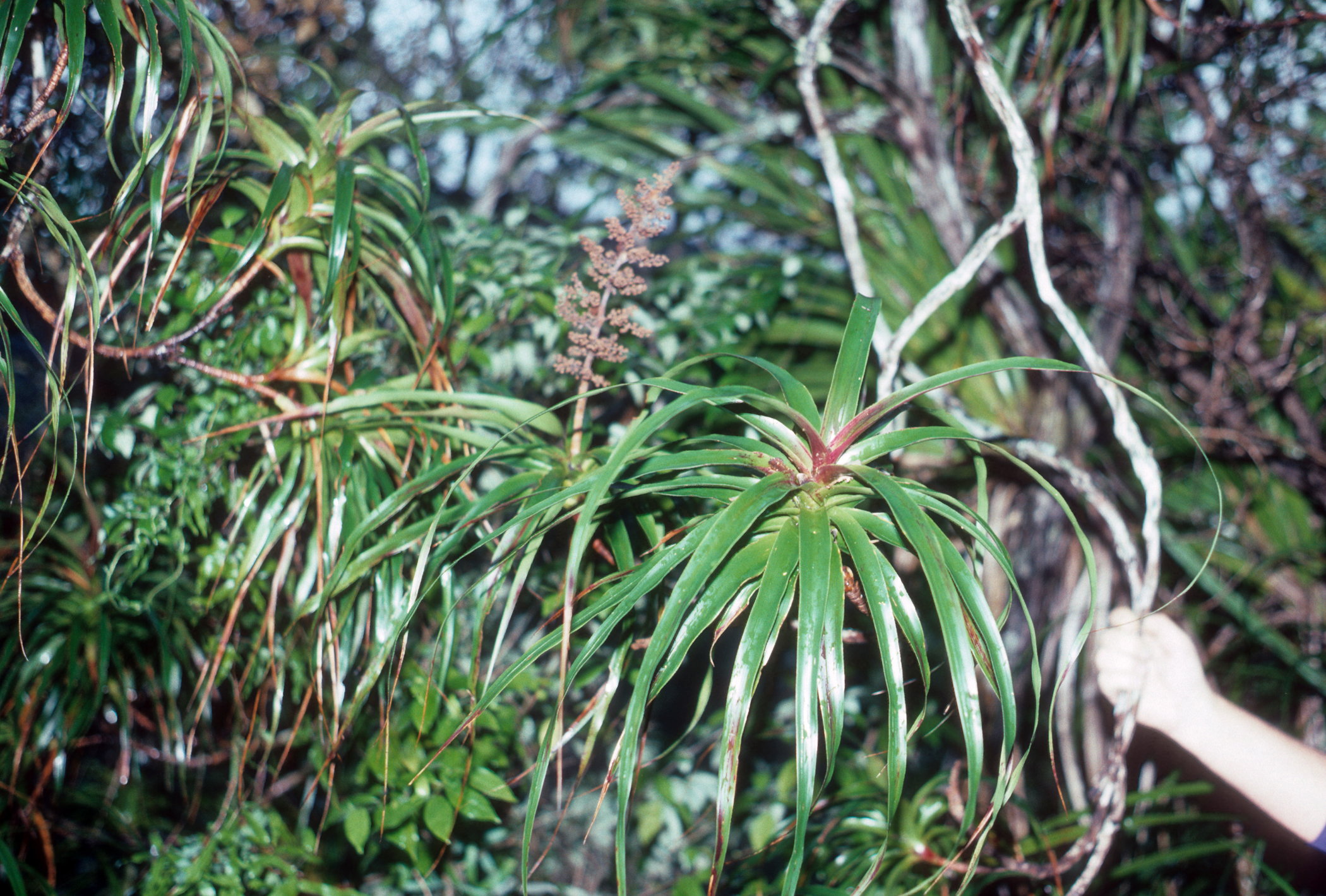

Scientific classification
- Kingdom: Plantae
- Clade: Tracheophytes
- Clade: Angiosperms
- Clade: Eudicots
- Clade: Asterids
- Order: Ericales
- Family: Ericaceae
- Genus: Dracophyllum
- Species: D. latifolium

Binomial name
- Dracophyllum latifolium A. Cunn.

= Dracophyllum latifolium =

Species of flowering plant

Dracophyllum latifolium, commonly called needle-leaved neinei or spider wood, is a species of plant in the family Ericaceae. It is endemic to the North Island of New Zealand. It is a tall shrub or tree, 3–10 m tall.
