= Kunzea dactylota =

Scientific classification
- Kingdom: Plantae
- Clade: Tracheophytes
- Clade: Angiosperms
- Clade: Eudicots
- Clade: Rosids
- Order: Myrtales
- Family: Myrtaceae
- Genus: Kunzea
- Species: K. dactylota

Binomial name
- Kunzea dactylota Toelken

Species of shrub

Kunzea dactylota is a flowering plant in the myrtle family, Myrtaceae and is endemic to a small area of New South Wales. It is a spreading shrub with small, finger-shaped leaves and clusters of white flowers near the end of the branches. It grows at high altitudes on the Southern Tablelands of the state.

== Description ==
Kunzea dactylota is a spreading shrub which grows to a height of about 1.3 m (4 ft) with its branches hairy when young. The leaves are linear in shape, appearing cylindrical, 5–8 mm (0.2–0.3 in) long and less than 1 mm (0.04 in) wide with a petiole less than 0.5 mm (0.02 in) long. The flowers are arranged in rounded heads of about seven to ten near the ends of the branches which often continue to grow during flowering. There are linear to lance-shaped bracts 4–7 mm (0.2–0.3 in) long and 1.0–1.5 mm (0.04–0.06 in) wide and smaller paired bracteoles at the base of the flowers. The floral cup is hairy and about 4 mm (0.2 in) long. The sepal lobes are triangular, about 2 mm (0.08 in) long and hairy. The petals are white, egg-shaped to almost round and about 1.5 mm (0.06 in) long. There are about 40-50 stamens which are about 3 mm (0.1 in) long. Flowering occurs between November and January.

== Taxonomy and naming ==
Kunzea dactylota was first formally described in 2016 by Hellmut R. Toelken from a specimen collected in the Tinderry Range and the description was published in Journal of the Adelaide Botanic Garden. The specific epithet (dactylota) is derived from the Ancient Greek word daktylos meaning "finger", referring to the finger-like appearance of the leaves of this species.

== Distribution and habitat ==
This kunzea grows in rocky places in heath with Tingiringi gum (Eucalyptus glaucescens) and snow gum (Eucalyptus pauciflora), mostly in the Tinderry Range.
