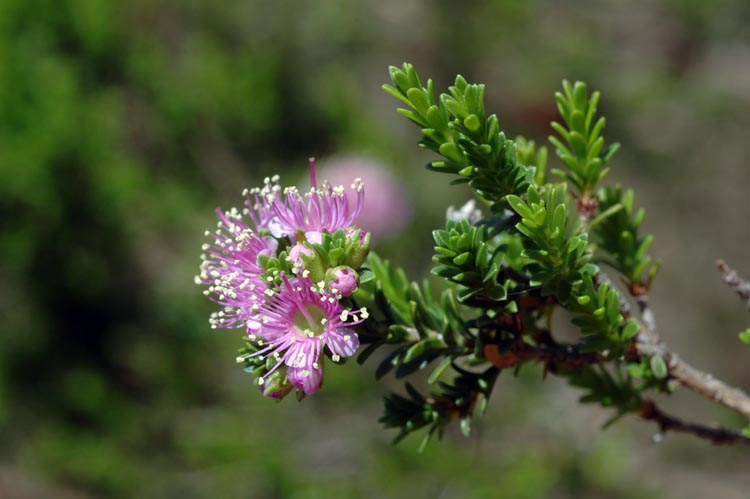

Scientific classification
- Kingdom: Plantae
- Clade: Tracheophytes
- Clade: Angiosperms
- Clade: Eudicots
- Clade: Rosids
- Order: Myrtales
- Family: Myrtaceae
- Genus: Kunzea
- Species: K. ciliata

Binomial name
- Kunzea ciliata Toelken

= Kunzea ciliata =

Species of shrub

Kunzea ciliata is a flowering plant in the myrtle family, Myrtaceae and is endemic to the south-west of Western Australia. It is a spreading shrub which typically grows to a height of 0.8 to 1.5 metres (3 to 5 ft) and blooms between October and November producing pink flowers.

== Description ==
Kunzea ciliata is a spreading shrub which usually grows to a height of 0.8–1.5 mm (0.03–0.06 in) with its branches densely hairy when young but glabrous later when corky bark develops. The leaves are narrow elliptic to lance-shaped with the narrower end towards the base, mostly 4–5 mm (0.16–0.20 in) long and about 1.5 mm (0.06 in) wide with a petiole up to 0.5 mm (0.02 in) long. The flowers are pink or pale pink and arranged in rounded clusters of twelve to eighteen mostly near the ends of longer branches which continue to grow after flowering. There are more or less hairy, leaf-like bracts 2–3 mm (0.08–0.1 in) long and smaller bracteoles in pairs at the base of the flowers. The floral cup is 3–4 mm (0.1–0.2 in) long and glabrous and the sepals are triangular and about 1 mm (0.04 in) long. The petals are broadly egg-shaped to almost round, about 3 mm (0.1 in) long and there are 43 to 48 stamens in several rows, each stamen 3.5–5 mm (0.1–0.2 in) long. Flowering occurs in October and November but sometimes in other months when conditions are favourable. The fruit that follows flowering is an urn-shaped capsule with the remains of the sepals attached.

== Taxonomy and naming ==
Kunzea capitata was first formally described in 1996 by Hellmut Toelken and the description was published in Journal of the Adelaide Botanic Garden. The specific epithet (ciliata) is derived from the Latin word cilium meaning "eyelash", referring to the hairy bracts.

== Distribution and habitat ==
Often found on or among granite slopes and gneiss outcrops in coastal areas, K. ciliata occurs between Cape Naturaliste and Cape Leeuwin where it grows in loamy sand soils.

== Conservation ==
Kunzea ciliata is listed as "not threatened" by the Government of Western Australia Department of Parks and Wildlife.
