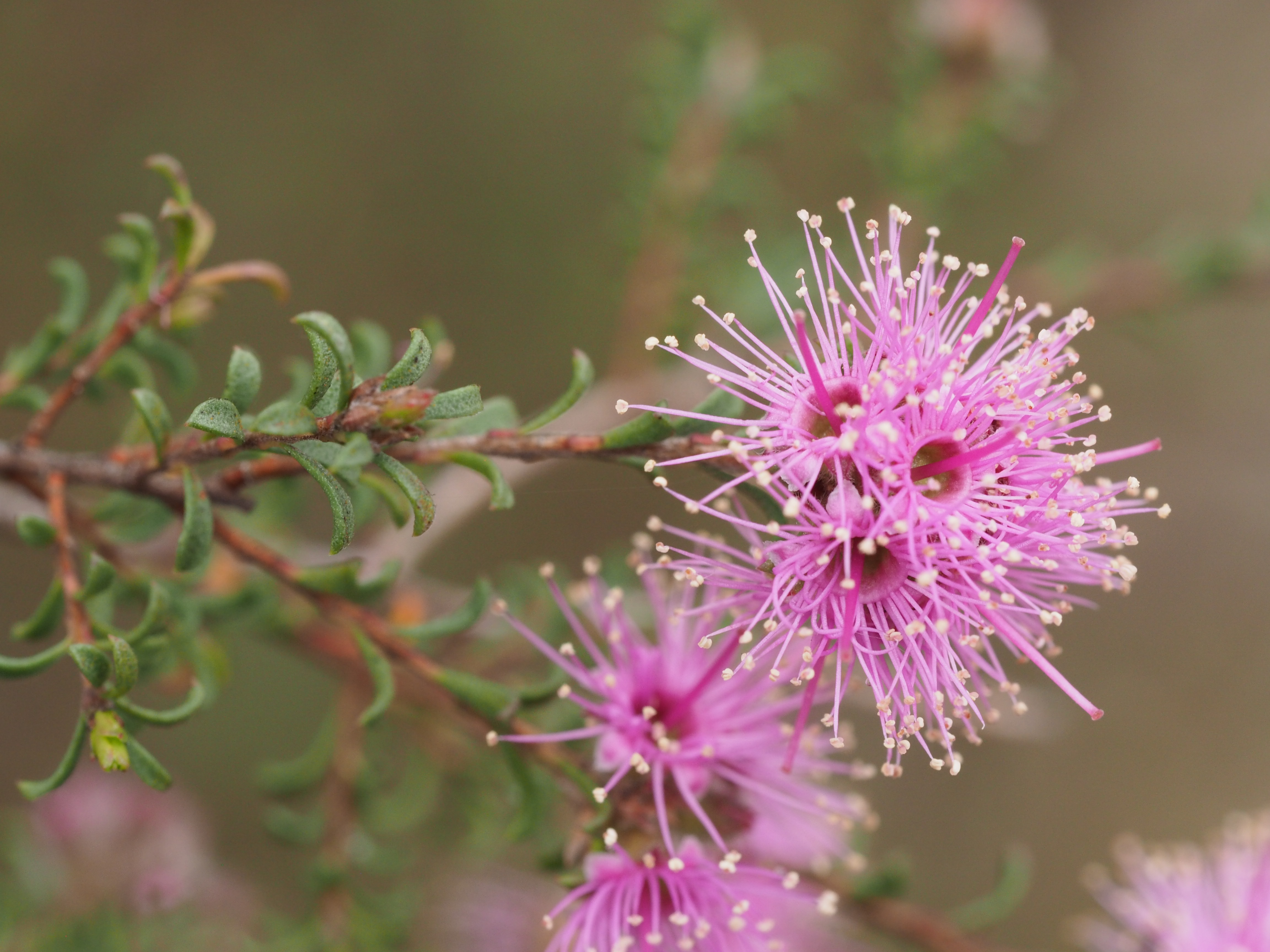
- Kunzea obovata growing near Tenterfield

Scientific classification
- Kingdom: Plantae
- Clade: Tracheophytes
- Clade: Angiosperms
- Clade: Eudicots
- Clade: Rosids
- Order: Myrtales
- Family: Myrtaceae
- Subfamily: Myrtoideae
- Tribe: Leptospermeae
- Genus: Kunzea; Rchb.

Synonyms
- Tillospermum Salisb.; Pentagonaster Klotzsch; Salisia Lindl.; Stenospermum Sweet ex Heynh.; Angasomyrtus Trudgen & Keighery

= Kunzea =

Genus of flowering plants

Kunzea is a genus of plants in the family Myrtaceae and is endemic to Australasia. They are shrubs, sometimes small trees and usually have small, crowded, rather aromatic leaves. The flowers are similar to those of plants in the genus Leptospermum but differ in having stamens that are longer than the petals. Most kunzeas are endemic to Western Australia but a few occur in eastern Australia and a few are found in New Zealand. The taxonomy of the genus is not settled and is complicated by the existence of a number of hybrids.

== Description ==
Plants in the genus Kunzea are shrubs or small trees, usually with their leaves arranged alternately along the branches. The flowers are arranged in clusters near the ends of the branches, which in some species, continue to grow after flowering. The flowers of most species lack a stalk but those that have one are usually solitary or in groups of two or three. In some species, the flowers are surrounded by enlarged bracts. There are five petals, five sepals and a large number of stamens which are always longer than the petals. The fruit is a usually a woody capsule. Kunzeas are similar to species in other genera of the Myrtaceae, especially Leptospermum but are distinguished from that genus by having stamens that are longer than the petals.

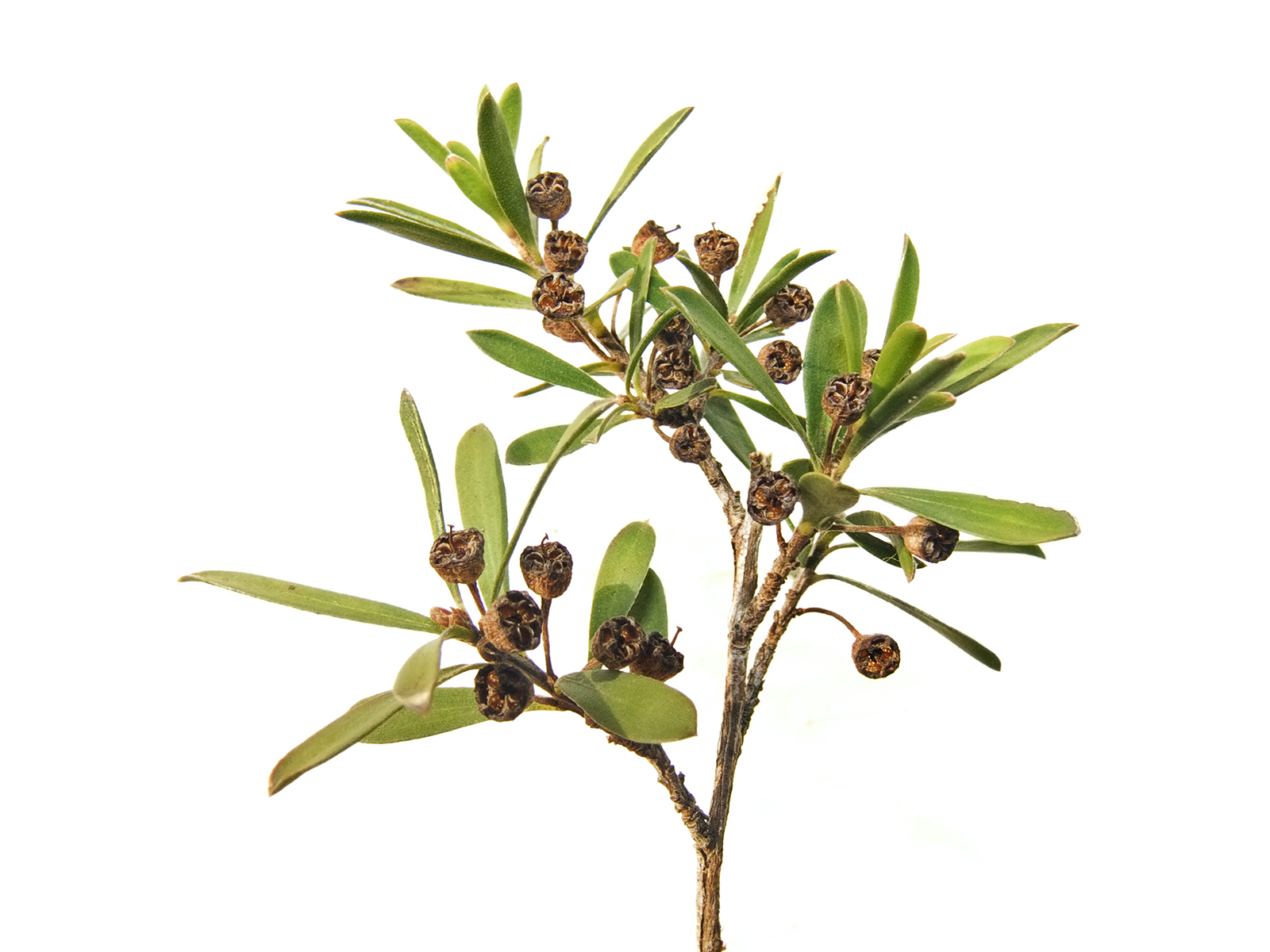
Kunzea phylicoides foliage and fruit

== Taxonomy and naming ==
The first formal description of a kunzea was published in 1828 by Ludwig Reichenbach in his book Conspectus Regni Vegetabilis. Reichenbach referred to three species – K. capitata, K. ericifolia and K. corifolia (now K. ambigua) – but did not nominate a type species. In 1981, Hellmut Toelken nominated K. capitata as the type species. Reichenbach named the genus after his "distinguished friend", the German naturalist Gustav Kunze, professor of botany in Leipzig. The taxonomy of the genus is not settled and hybrids often occur where two species occur in the same area.

== Distribution ==
The majority of Kunzea species are endemic to the south-west of Western Australia but there are species in every Australian state and in New Zealand.

== Use in horticulture ==
Some species of Kunzea are suitable for use in gardens. Kunzea ambigua is described as a "handsome shrub which attracts numerous birds and colourful soldier beetles when in flower". A form of this species from southern Victoria reputedly flowers profusely with sprays of scented flowers. Kunzea capitata and K. pulchella are red-flowering species from Western Australia and are described as "indeed outstanding" although they are sometimes difficult to establish in eastern states and need to be grafted onto hardier rootstock.

== Species ==
Sourced from the authoritative Australian Plant Name Index and Australian Plant Census as of January 2017 and the Kew Gardens World Checklist of Selected Plant Families.

- Kunzea acicularis Toelken & G.F.Craig – WA
- Kunzea acuminata Toelken – WA
- Kunzea affinis S.Moore – WA
- Kunzea amathicola de Lange & Toelken, rawiritoa – NZ
- Kunzea aristulata Toelken – NSW
- Kunzea ambigua (Sm.) Druce, tick bush – NSW, TAS, VIC
- Kunzea axillaris Toelken – NSW
- Kunzea badjaensis Toelken – NSW
- Kunzea baxteri (Klotzsch) Schauer, scarlet kunzea – WA
- Kunzea bracteolata Maiden & Betche – NSW, QLD
- Kunzea caduca Toelken – QLD
- Kunzea calida F.Muell. – QLD
- Kunzea cambagei Maiden & Betche – NSW
- Kunzea capitata (Sm.) Heynh., pink kunzea – NSW, QLD
- Kunzea ciliata Toelken – WA
- Kunzea cincinnata Toelken – WA
- Kunzea clavata Toelken – WA
- Kunzea dactylota Toelken – NSW
- Kunzea ericifolia (Sm.) Rchb. ex Heynh., spearwood, pondil – WA
- Kunzea ericoides (A.Rich.) Joy Thomps., manuoea, titira, atitira, kanuka - NZ
- Kunzea eriocalyx F.Muell. – WA
- Kunzea flavescens C.T.White & W.D.Francis, – QLD
- Kunzea glabrescens Toelken, spearwood – WA
- Kunzea graniticola Byrnes – QLD
- Kunzea jucunda Diels & E.Pritz. – WA
- Kunzea juniperoides Toelken – NSW
- Kunzea leptospermoides F.Muell. ex Miq, Yarra burgan - VIC
- Kunzea linearis (Kirk) de Lange & Toelken, rawiri manuka – NZ
- Kunzea micrantha Schauer – WA
- Kunzea micromera Schauer – WA
- Kunzea montana (Diels) Domin, mountain kunzea – WA
- Kunzea muelleri Benth., yellow kunzea – NSW
- Kunzea newbeyi Toelken – WA
- Kunzea obovata Byrnes – NSW, QLD
- Kunzea occidentalis Toelken – NSW
- Kunzea opposita F.Muell. – NSW, QLD
- Kunzea parvifolia Schauer, violet kunzea – NSW, QLD, VIC
- Kunzea pauciflora Schauer – WA
- Kunzea peduncularis F.Muell. – VIC
- Kunzea petrophila Toelken – NT
- Kunzea phylicoides (A.Cunn. ex Schauer) Druce – NSW, VIC
- Kunzea pomifera F.Muell., muntries – VIC, SA
- Kunzea praestans Schauer – WA
- Kunzea preissiana Schauer – WA
- Kunzea pulchella (Lindl.) A.S.George, granite kunzea – WA
- Kunzea recurva Schauer – WA
- Kunzea robusta de Lange & Toelken, manuka, kanuka, kopuka, rawirinui, maru, rauriki – NZ
- Kunzea × rosea (Turcz.) Govaerts – WA
- Kunzea rostrata Toelken – WA
- Kunzea rupestris Blakely – NSW
- Kunzea salina (Trudgen & Keighery) Toelken & de Lange – WA
- Kunzea salterae de Lange – NZ
- Kunzea sericothrix Toelken – QLD
- Kunzea serotina de Lange, makahikatoa – NZ
- Kunzea similis Toelken – WA
- Kunzea sinclairii (Kirk) W.Harris, Great Barrier Island kanuka – NZ
- Kunzea spathulata Toelken – WA
- Kunzea × squarrosa Turcz. – WA
- Kunzea strigosa Toelken & G.F.Craig – WA
- Kunzea sulphurea Tovey & P.Morris – WA
- Kunzea tenuicaulis de Lange, geothermal kanuka, geothermal kunzea, prostrate kanuka – NZ
- Kunzea toelkenii de Lange – NZ
- Kunzea triregenis de Lange, Three Kings kanuka – NZ
- Kunzea truncata Toelken – QLD

== Gallery ==
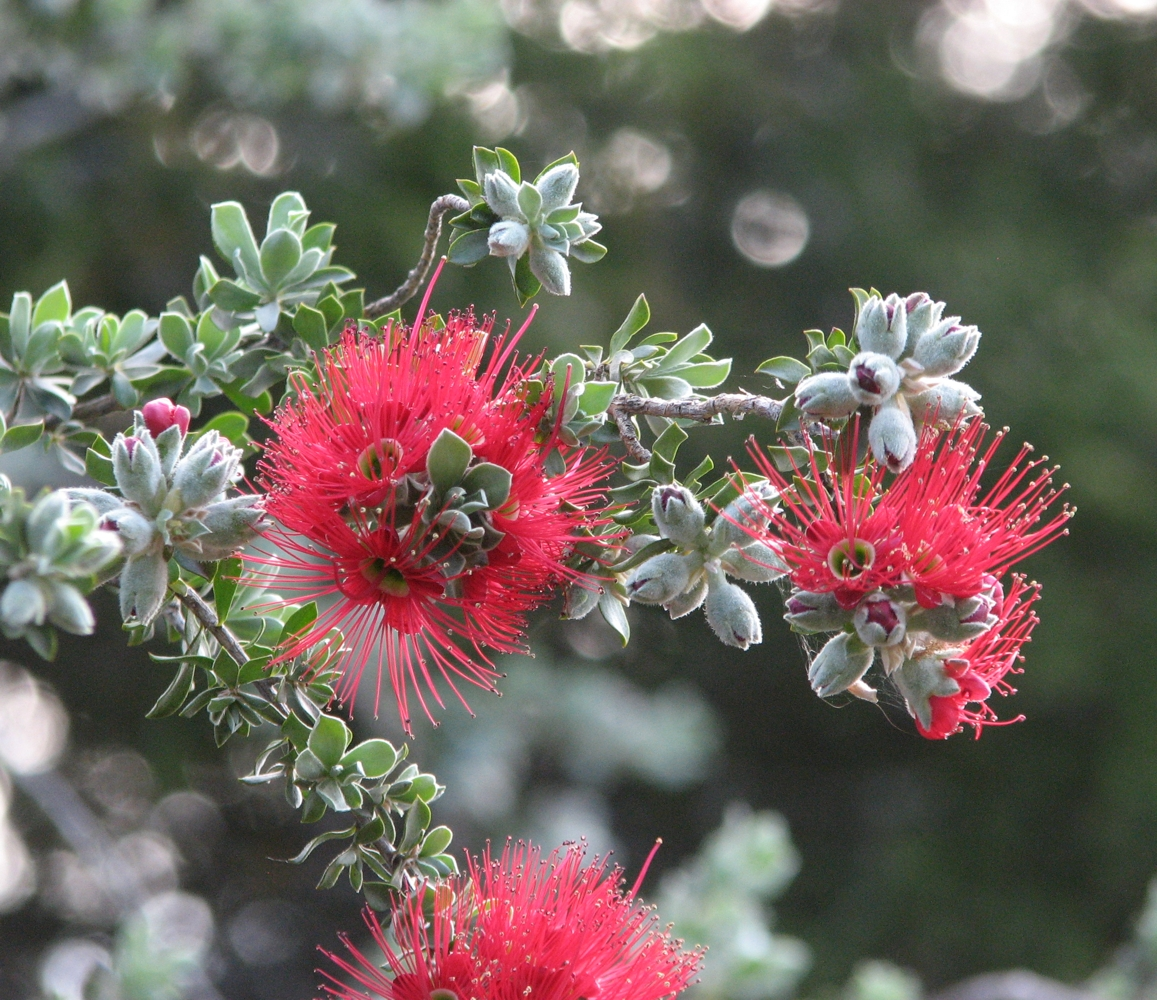
Kunzea pulchella in Maranoa Gardens

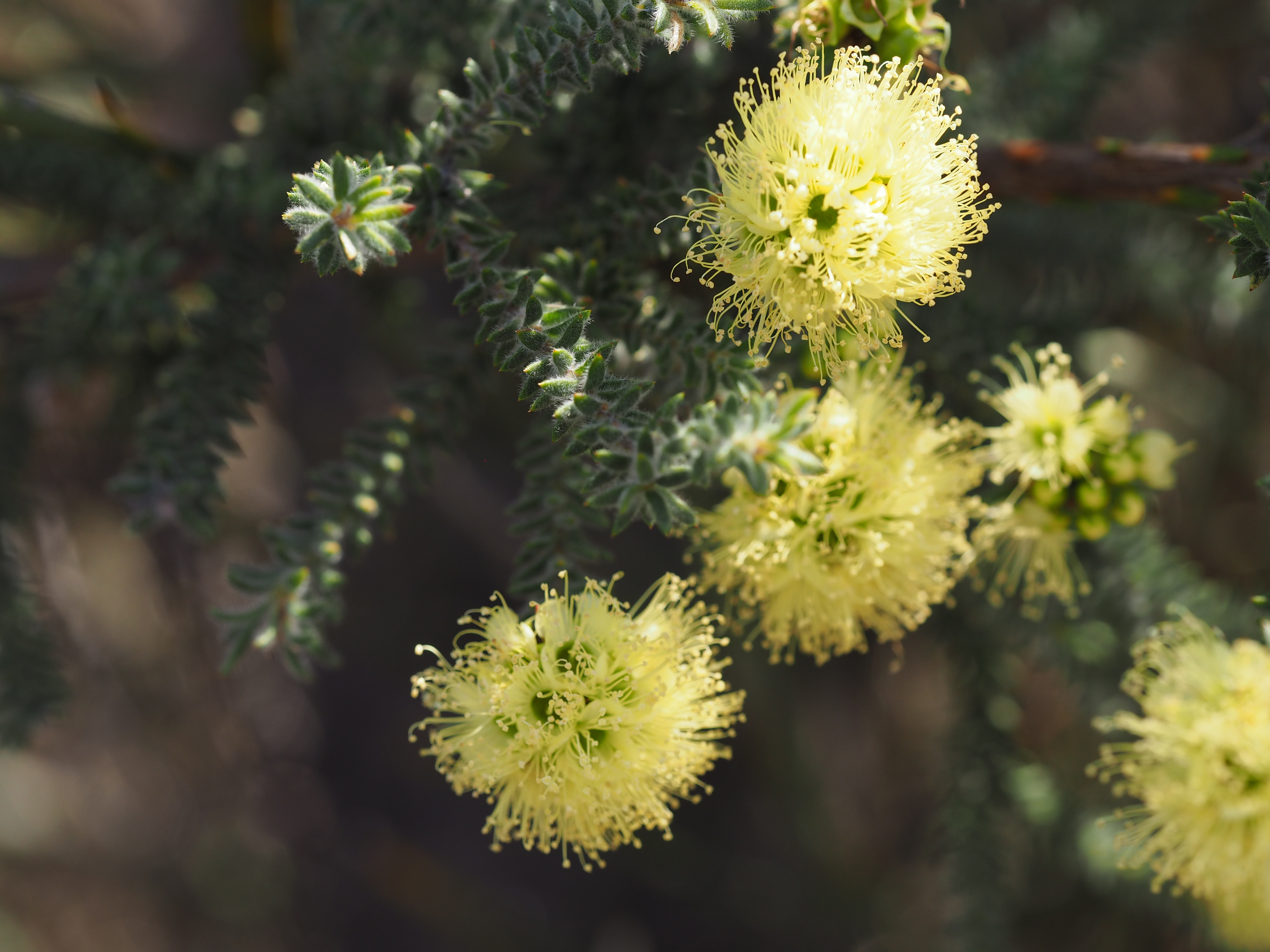
Kunzea ericifolia in Mount Barney National Park

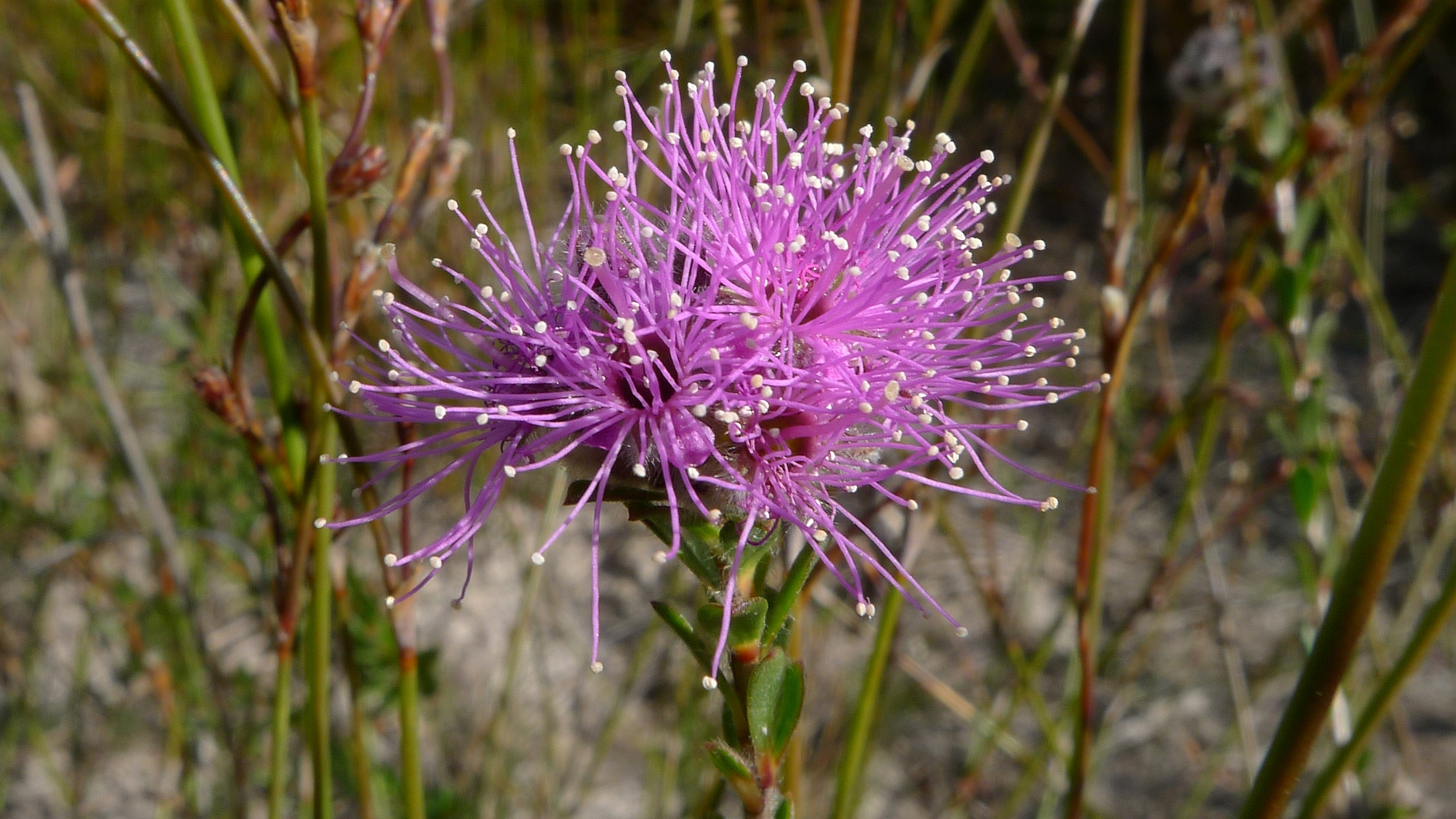
Kunzea capitata in the Royal National Park

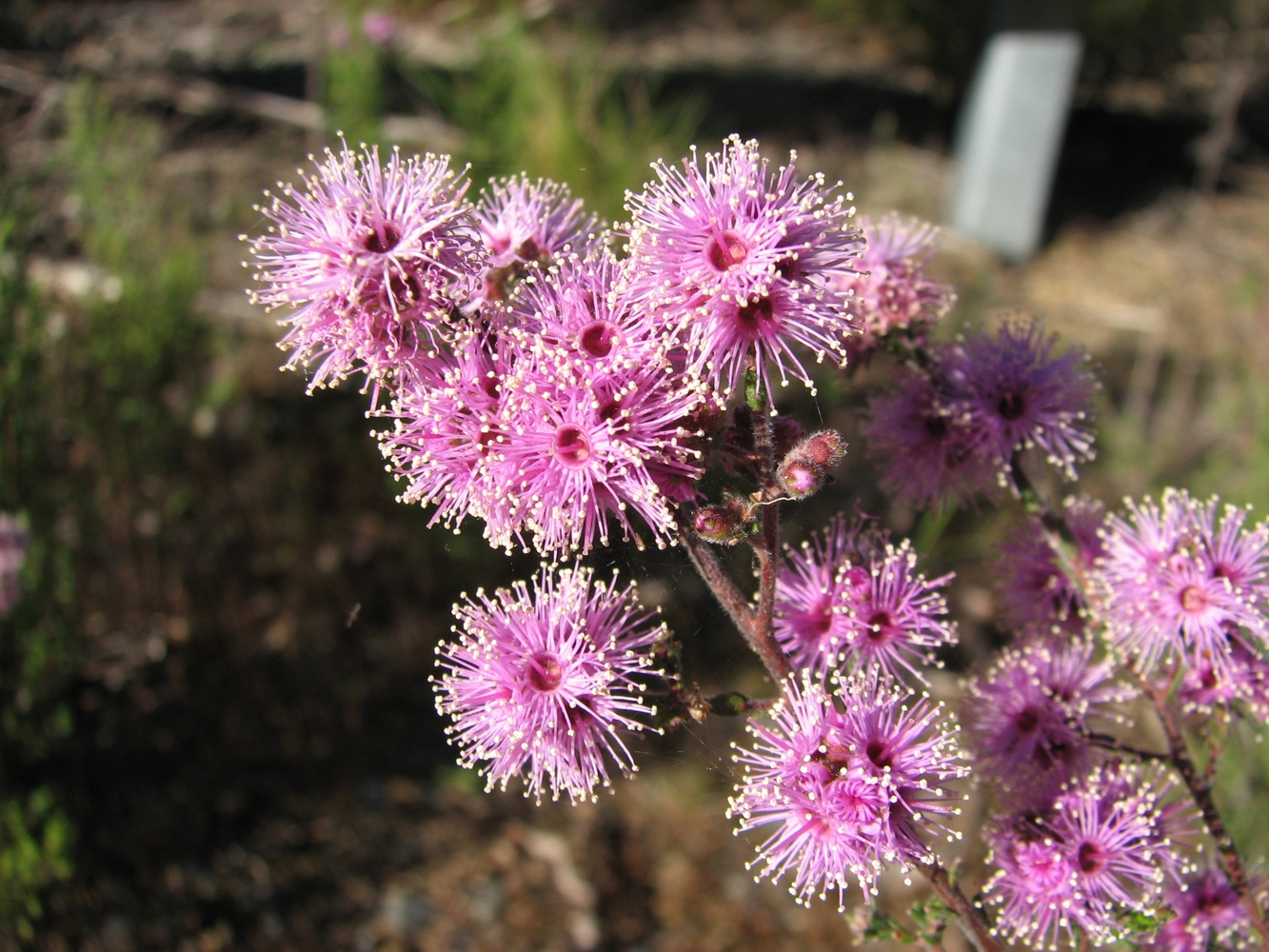
Kunzea parvifolia in the Mount Buffalo National Park

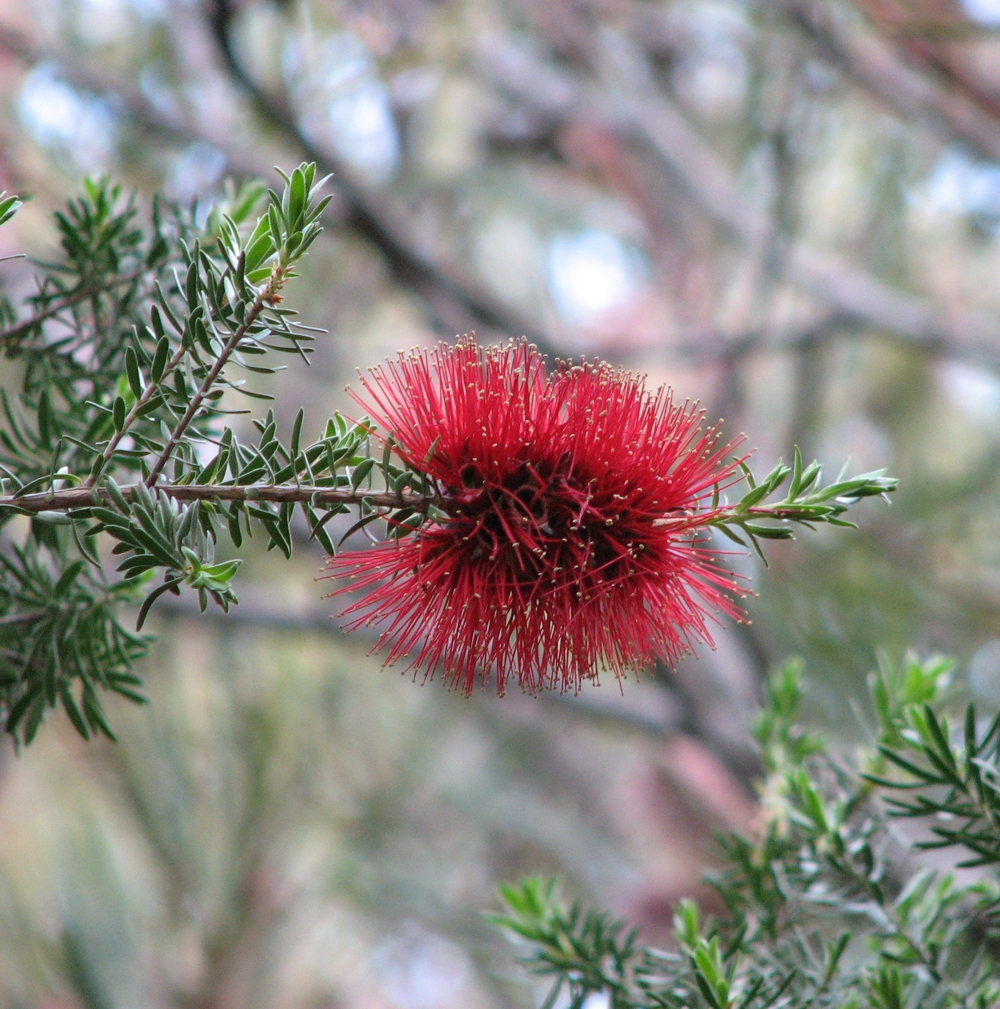
Kunzea baxteri in Maranoa Gardens
