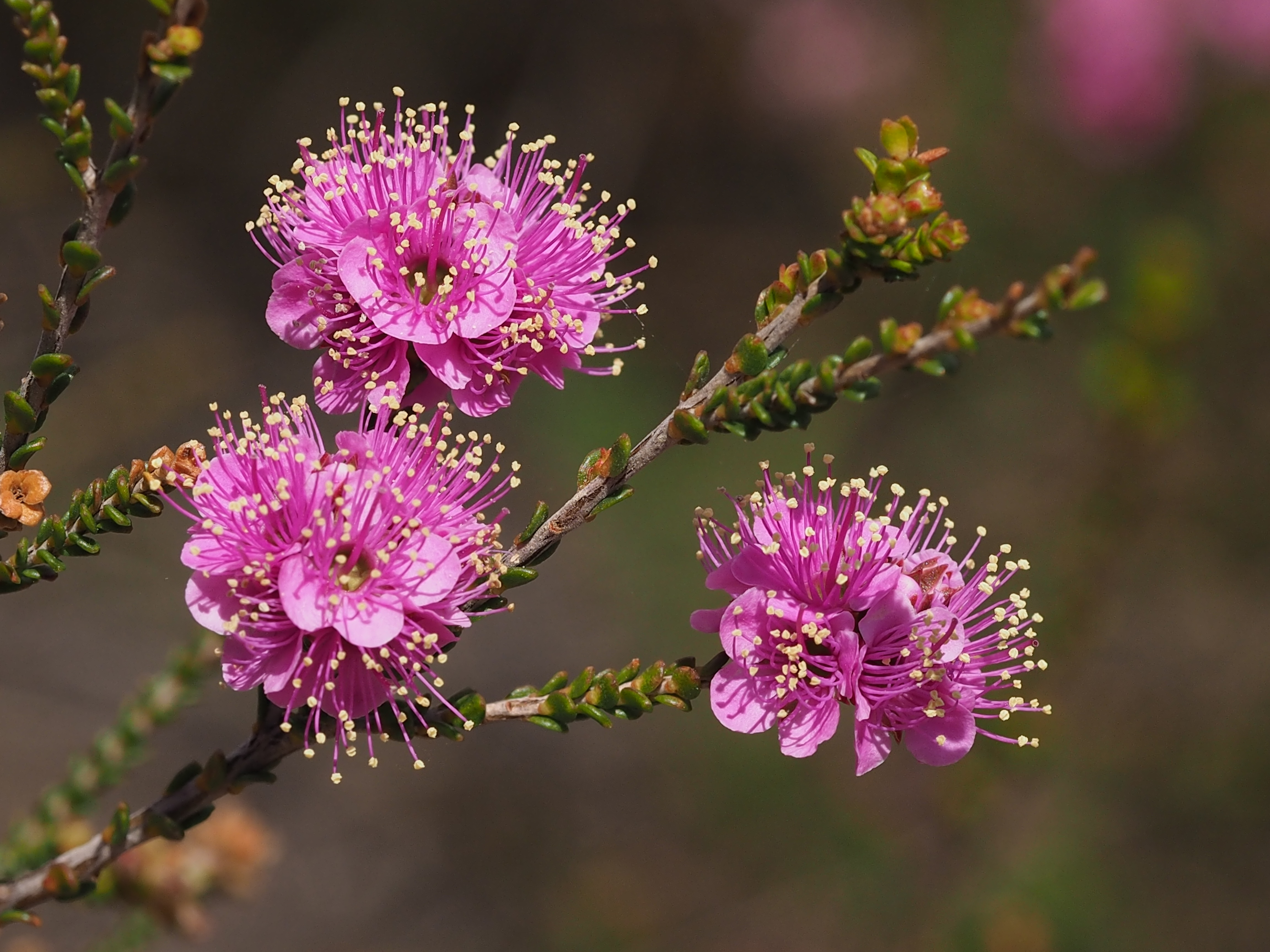

Scientific classification
- Kingdom: Plantae
- Clade: Tracheophytes
- Clade: Angiosperms
- Clade: Eudicots
- Clade: Rosids
- Order: Myrtales
- Family: Myrtaceae
- Genus: Kunzea
- Species: K. rostrata

Binomial name
- Kunzea rostrata Toelken

= Kunzea rostrata =

Species of flowering plant

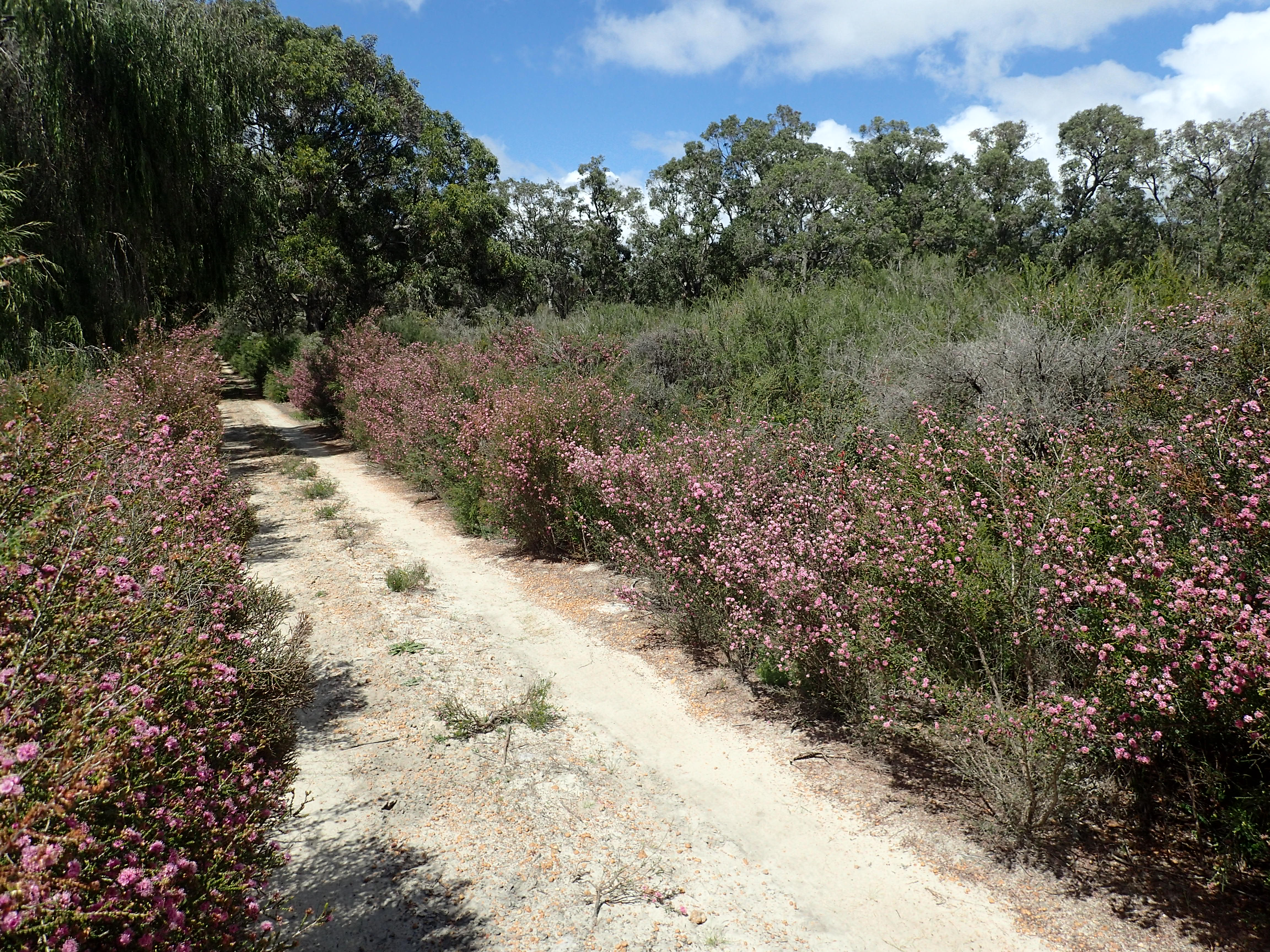
Habit in Yelverton National Park

Kunzea rostrata is a species of flowering plant in the myrtle family, Myrtaceae and is endemic to an area along the south west coast of Western Australia. It is a shrub with small, mostly elliptic leaves, and groups of between eleven and fifteen rose pink flowers, mainly on the ends of branches that continue to grow after flowering.

== Description ==
Kunzea rostrata is a shrub with many branches and that typically grows to a height of 1.6–3 m (5 ft 3 in – 9 ft 10 in). It has elliptic to egg-shaped leaves 2–3 mm (0.079–0.118 in) long and about 2 mm (0.079 in) wide on a petiole 0.2–0.5 mm (0.0079–0.0197 in) long. It has more or less spherical groups of flowers on the ends of branches that continue to grow after flowering. There are usually between eleven and fifteen rose pink flowers in the groups. There are egg-shaped bracts 2–2.5 mm (0.079–0.098 in) long and about 2 mm (0.079 in) wide at the base of the flowers and well as pairs of similar bracteoles. The floral cup is 3.5–4 mm (0.14–0.16 in) long at flowering time. The sepals are triangular to lance-shaped, 2–2.5 mm (0.079–0.098 in) and glabrous and the petals are egg-shaped and about 3 mm (0.12 in) long. There are between 25 and 38 stamens 4–55 mm (0.16–2.17 in) long in several whorls. Flowering occurs in October and November and the fruit is an urn-shaped capsule.

== Taxonomy and naming ==
Kunzea rostrata was first formally described in 1996 by Hellmut R. Toelken and the description was published in Journal of the Adelaide Botanic Garden. The specific epithet (rostrata) is a Latin word meaning 'beaked', referring to the point on the tip of the sepals.

== Distribution and habitat ==
This kunzea is only known from the area between Cape Naturaliste Peninsula and Cowaramup Bay near Gracetown, often found growing in grey sands or peaty soils along the coast.
