= Kunzea sericothrix =

Scientific classification
- Kingdom: Plantae
- Clade: Tracheophytes
- Clade: Angiosperms
- Clade: Eudicots
- Clade: Rosids
- Order: Myrtales
- Family: Myrtaceae
- Genus: Kunzea
- Species: K. sericothrix

Binomial name
- Kunzea sericothrix Toelken

Species of shrub

Kunzea sericothrix is a plant in the myrtle family, Myrtaceae and is endemic to Queensland. It is a small shrub with linear to lance-shaped leaves. It is only known from a single collection, and the details of its flowers are provisional.

== Description ==
Kunzea sericothrix is a shrub that grows to a height of about 0.5 m (2 ft). The branches, leaves and floral cup are covered with long, silky hairs. The leaves are arranged alternately along the branches and are linear to lance-shaped with the narrower end towards the base. They are 5–6 mm (0.2–0.2 in) long, 1–2 mm (0.04–0.08 in) wide and taper to an indistinct petiole. The flowers are only known from the buds of a single collection and the description of them is provisional. The flowers are arranged in rounded groups of five to eight flowers on the ends of the branches and are surrounded by egg-shaped bracts and pairs of bracteoles. The sepals are triangular and about 0.7 mm (0.03 in) long and the floral cup is longer than the sepals. The petals are more or less round and about 1.5 mm (0.06 in) long. There are about forty stamens in several whorls and are 0.9–1.8 mm (0.04–0.07 in) long. Flowering occurs in September.

== Taxonomy and naming ==
Kunzea sericothrix was first formally described in 2016 by Hellmut Toelken and the description was published in Journal of the Adelaide Botanic Gardens. The specific epithet (sericothrix) is derived from the Ancient Greek words serikos meaning "silken" or "silky" and thrix meaning "hair", referring to the fine, long hairs covering the plant.

== Distribution and habitat ==
The only collection of this kunzea was from a plant growing in a rocky watercourse in the Eungella National Park.

== Conservation status ==
This kunzea is listed as "endangered" under the Queensland Government Nature Conservation Act 1992.
