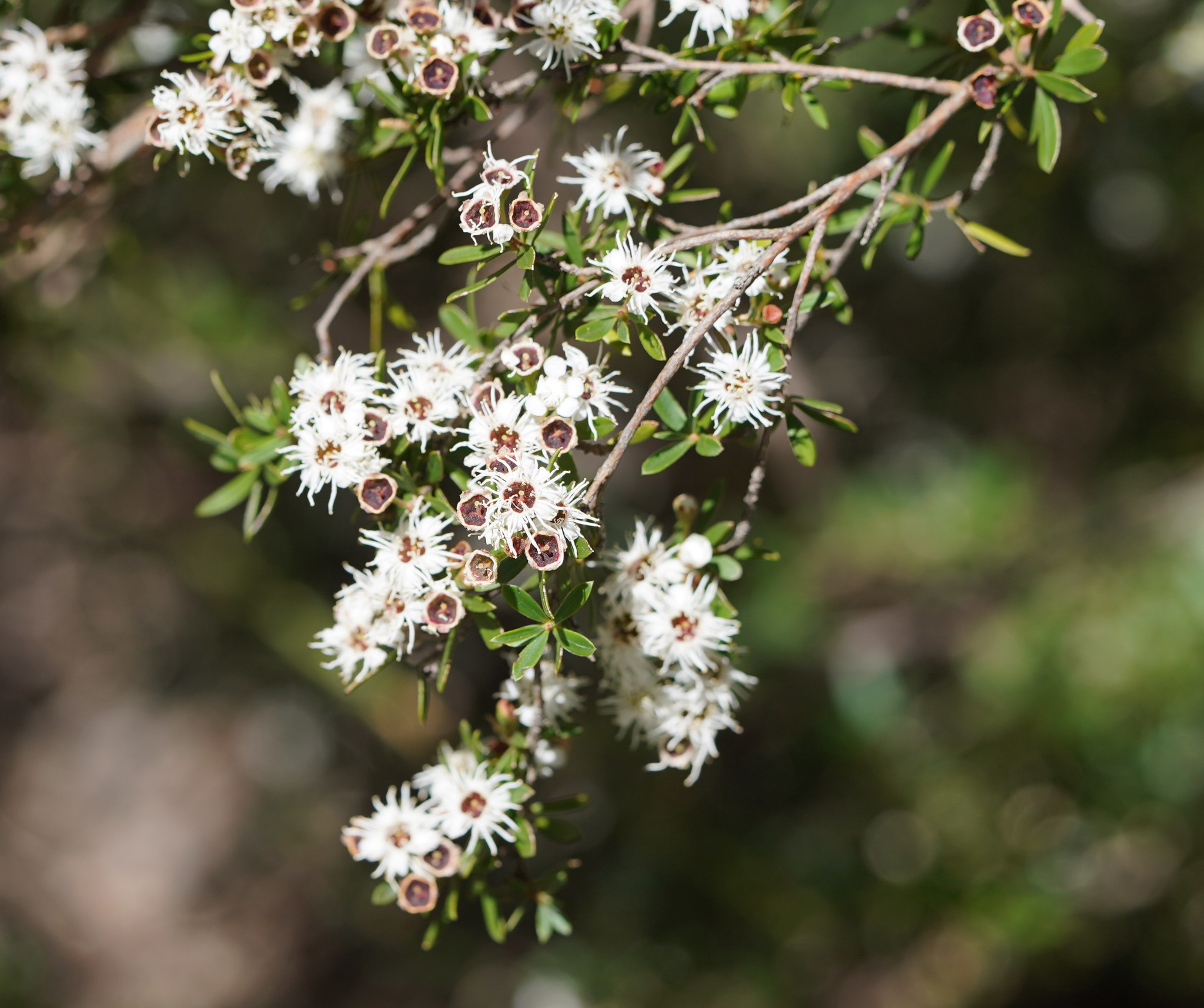
- On Mount Buffalo

Scientific classification
- Kingdom: Plantae
- Clade: Tracheophytes
- Clade: Angiosperms
- Clade: Eudicots
- Clade: Rosids
- Order: Myrtales
- Family: Myrtaceae
- Genus: Kunzea
- Species: K. peduncularis

Binomial name
- Kunzea peduncularis F.Muell.

= Kunzea peduncularis =

Mountain burgan

Species of flowering plant

Kunzea peduncularis, commonly known as mountain burgan, is a flowering plant in Myrtaceae, the myrtle family, and is endemic to Victoria, Australia. It is usually a dense shrub and has lance-shaped to egg-shaped leaves with the narrower end towards the base. Dense groups of white flowers appear in early summer.

== Description ==
Kunzea peduncularis is a spreading shrub which grows to a height of about 1–2 metres (3–7 feet) but sometimes a single-trunked tree more than 4 m (10 ft) tall. The leaves are arranged alternately, lance-shaped to egg-shaped with the narrower end towards the base, 5–13 mm (0.2–0.5 in) long and 2–3.5 mm (0.08–0.1 in) wide with a petiole 1 mm (0.04 in) or less long. The flowers are white and crowded in leaf axils near the ends of the branches on pedicels up to 1 mm (0.04 in) long. The floral cup is about 3 mm (0.1 in) and usually hairy. The sepal lobes are green, triangular and about 1 mm (0.04 in) long. The petals are white, almost round and about 2 mm (0.08 in) in diameter and there are 50-65 stamens which are up to 4 mm (0.2 in) long. Flowering occurs between November and January.

== Taxonomy and naming ==
Kunzea peduncularis was first formally described in 1855 by Ferdinand von Mueller from a specimen found "at the foot of the Australian Alps on the banks of rivers and rivulets". The description was published in his book Definitions of rare or hitherto undescribed Australian plants. The specific epithet (peduncularis) is derived from the Latin word pedunculus meaning "small, slender stalk".

This kunzea was formerly included in Kunzea ericoides but that species is now regarded as a New Zealand endemic.

== Distribution and habitat ==
Mountain burgan grows in montane and subalpine woodland in eastern Victoria, usually at altitudes above 900 m (3,000 ft).

== Use in horticulture ==
Kunzea peduncularis is suitable for use as a screening plant. It grows best in full sun in well-drained soils and attracts butterflies.
