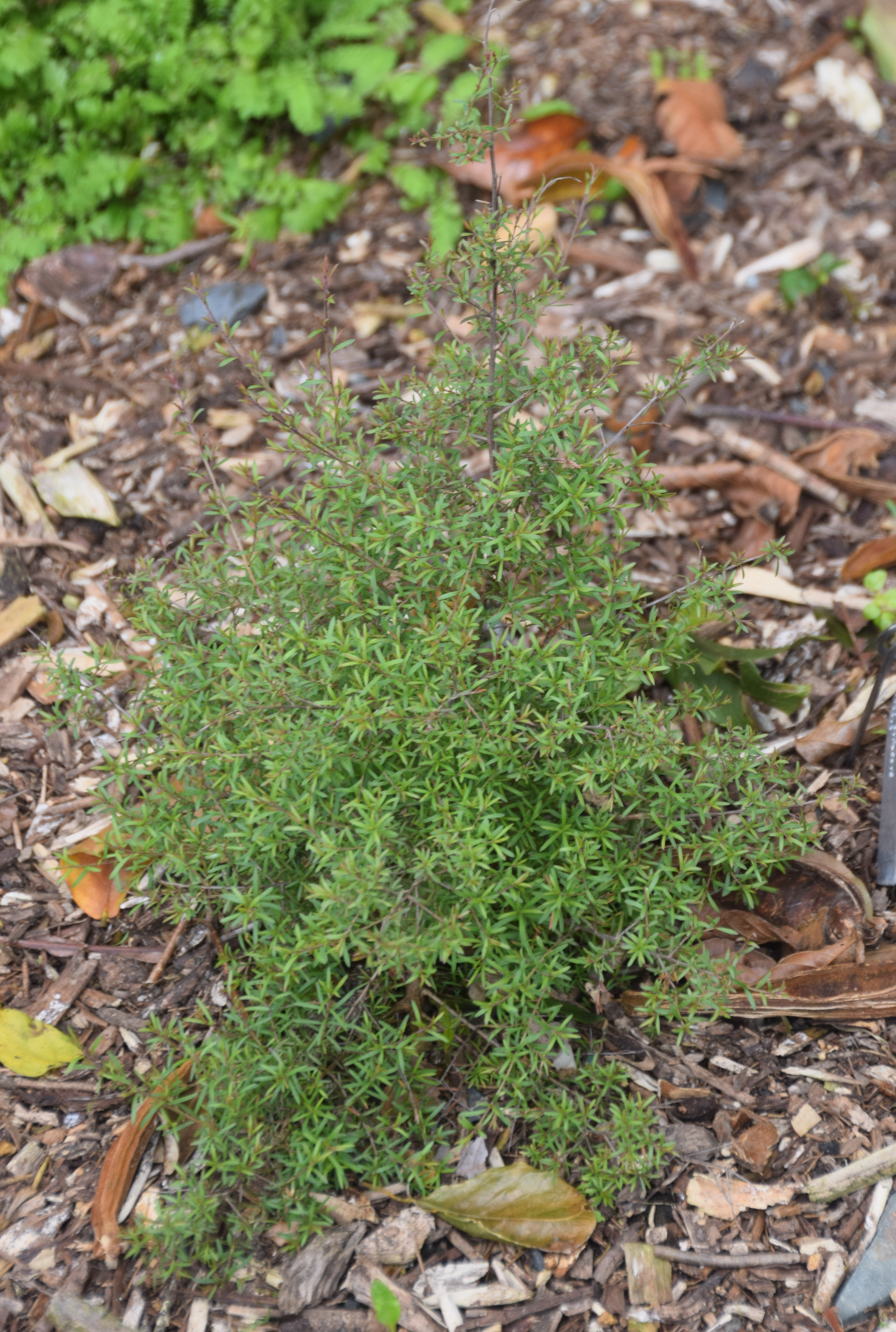
- In Auckland Botanic Gardens

Scientific classification
- Kingdom: Plantae
- Clade: Tracheophytes
- Clade: Angiosperms
- Clade: Eudicots
- Clade: Rosids
- Order: Myrtales
- Family: Myrtaceae
- Genus: Kunzea
- Species: K. salterae

Binomial name
- Kunzea salterae de Lange

= Kunzea salterae =

Species of flowering plant

Kunzea salterae, also known by the Māori name Moutohora kānuka, is a flowering plant in the myrtle family, Myrtaceae and is endemic to Moutohora Island in New Zealand. It is a much-branched shrub or small spreading tree with needle-like leaves, sprays of white flowers and small cup-shaped or urn-shaped fruit.

== Description ==
Kunzea salterae is a densely-branched shrub or small tree which grows to a height of 0.1–10 m (0.3–30 ft) with a pendulous or spreading crown 2–6 m (7–20 ft) wide. The leaves are linear to lance-shaped, 4–18 mm (0.2–0.7 in) long and 0.6–2 mm (0.02–0.08 in) wide. The flowers are white and arranged in groups of between two and eight and the individual flowers are 7–12.5 mm (0.3–0.5 in) in diameter on pedicels 1–3 mm (0.04–0.1 in) long. The five sepals are triangular, about 1 mm (0.04 in) long and wide and the five petals are more or less round, about 1.5 mm (0.06 in) long and wide. Flowering occurs between August and April and the fruit is a dry, cup-shaped to urn-shaped capsule 2–3 mm (0.08–0.1 in) long and 2–4 mm (0.08–0.2 in) wide.

== Taxonomy and naming ==
Kunzea salterae was first formally described in 2014 by Peter James de Lange and the description was published in PhytoKeys. The specific epithet (salterae) honours New Zealand botanist and draughtswoman Joshua Salter (born 1946) of Auckland.

== Distribution and habitat ==
This kunzea grows in shrubland and regenerating forest on Moutohora Island.

== Conservation status ==
Kunzea salterae is listed as "threatened - nationally vulnerable" under the New Zealand threat classification series 3.
