= Kunzea juniperoides =

Scientific classification
- Kingdom: Plantae
- Clade: Tracheophytes
- Clade: Angiosperms
- Clade: Eudicots
- Clade: Rosids
- Order: Myrtales
- Family: Myrtaceae
- Genus: Kunzea
- Species: K. juniperoides

Binomial name
- Kunzea juniperoides Toelken

Species of shrub

Kunzea juniperoides is a flowering plant in the myrtle family, Myrtaceae and is endemic to a small area of New South Wales. It is a small shrub with narrow leaves and small groups of white flowers near the end of the longer branches. It is distinguished from similar kunzeas by the large number of scale-like perules and bracts surrounding the groups of flowers.

== Description ==
Kunzea juniperoides is a shrub which grows to a height of 0.15–0.6 m (0.5–2 ft) with its branches hairy when young. The leaves are linear in shape, 3–8 mm (0.1–0.3 in) long and less than 1 mm (0.04 in) wide with a petiole less than 0.5 mm (0.02 in) long. The flowers are arranged in groups of mostly three to eight near the ends of the branches. There are large numbers of broadly egg-shaped bracts 3–5.5 mm (0.1–0.2 in) long and 2–4.5 mm (0.08–0.2 in) wide and smaller paired bracteoles at the base of the flowers. The floral cup is hairy and about 3 mm (0.1 in) long. The sepal lobes are egg-shaped to triangular, about 1 mm (0.04 in) long and glabrous. The petals are white, egg-shaped to almost round and about 1.5 mm (0.06 in) long. There are about 30-35 stamens which are about 2 mm (0.08 in) long.

== Taxonomy and naming ==
Kunzea juniperoides was first formally described in 2016 by Hellmut R. Toelken and the description was published in Journal of the Adelaide Botanic Garden. The specific epithet (juniperoides) refers to the similarity of the leaves of this species to those of miniature forms of Juniperus communis. (The suffix -oides means "likeness" in Latin.)

There are two subspecies:

- Kunzea juniperoides subsp. juniperoides which has leaves which are mostly 3–6 mm (0.1–0.2 in) long and grows in low heath near Braidwood;
- Kunzea juniperoides subsp. pervervosa which has leaves which are mostly 6.5–8 mm (0.26–0.31 in) long and grows in woodland on the Pigeon House Range.

== Distribution and habitat ==
This kunzea grows in heath and woodland on the South Coast and nearby tablelands of New South Wales.
