= Kunzea aristulata =

Scientific classification
- Kingdom: Plantae
- Clade: Tracheophytes
- Clade: Angiosperms
- Clade: Eudicots
- Clade: Rosids
- Order: Myrtales
- Family: Myrtaceae
- Genus: Kunzea
- Species: K. aristulata

Binomial name
- Kunzea aristulata Toelken

Species of flowering plant

Kunzea aristulata is a flowering plant in the myrtle family, Myrtaceae and is endemic to a small area of New South Wales. It is an erect, spreading shrub similar to Kunzea rupestris but is distinguished from it mainly by the shape of its leaves. It is only known from a remote area north of Yerranderie where it often grows on cliff edges.

== Description ==
Kunzea aristulata is an erect, spreading shrub which grows to a height of up to 2 m (7 ft) with its branches silky hairy when young. The leaves are elliptic to broad elliptic, 3–6 mm (0.1–0.2 in) long, about 2 mm (0.08 in) wide and covered with soft hairs when young. The leaves often abruptly taper to a sharp point. Only the midvein of the leaf is prominent. The flowers are usually arranged in clusters of between five and fifteen flowers on the ends of the branches. The floral cup is about 4 mm (0.2 in) long and glabrous. The sepal lobes are broadly triangular, 1–2 mm (0.04–0.08 in) long and pointed. The petals are white to cream-coloured, more or less round to egg-shaped, about 1 mm (0.04 in) long and there are about fifty stamens which are 1–2 mm (0.04–0.08 in) long. Flowering occurs in October and November and the fruit are urn-shaped capsules which are 4–5 mm (0.16–0.20 in) long and about 3 mm (0.1 in) wide.

== Taxonomy and naming ==
Kunzea aristulata was first formally described in 2016 by Hellmut Toelken and the description was published in Journal of the Adelaide Botanic Garden. The specific epithet (aristulata) is the diminutive form of the Latin word aristatus meaning "awned" or "with ears" referring to the short point on the end of the leaves.

== Distribution and habitat ==
This kunzea grows in open forest, often on cliff edges, north of Yerranderie.
