= Kunzea eriocalyx =

Conservation status
- Priority Two — Poorly Known Taxa (DEC)

Scientific classification
- Kingdom: Plantae
- Clade: Tracheophytes
- Clade: Angiosperms
- Clade: Eudicots
- Clade: Rosids
- Order: Myrtales
- Family: Myrtaceae
- Genus: Kunzea
- Species: K. eriocalyx

Binomial name
- Kunzea eriocalyx F.Muell.

Species of flowering plant

Kunzea eriocalyx is a flowering plant in the myrtle family, Myrtaceae and is endemic to a small area on the south coast of Western Australia. It is a shrub with spreading main stems with a few short side branches and which grows to a height of 0.5 to 1 metre (2 to 3 ft). It blooms between August and October producing pink flowers.

== Description ==
Kunzea eriocalyx is a shrub with spreading stems with a few short branches and which grows to a height of 0.5–1 m (2–3 ft). The leaves are mostly clustered on the ends of the side branches which also have groups of flowers in the flowering season. The leaves are linear, more or less shaped like a baseball bat, 2.5–4.5 mm (0.1–0.2 in) long and less than 1 mm (0.04 in) wide with a petiole up to 1 mm (0.04 in) long. The flowers are arranged in heads of mostly five to seven on the ends of the side branches. The flowers are surrounded by hairy bracts 3 mm (0.1 in) long and 2 mm (0.08 in) wide and shorter pairs of bracteoles. The floral cup is 2.5–3 mm (0.098–0.12 in) long and the five sepals are lance-shaped, hairy and about 1 mm (0.04 in) long. The five petals are 1.5–2 mm (0.06–0.08 in) long and pink and there eleven to fifteen stamens. Flowering occurs between August and October and is followed by fruit which are urn-shaped capsules with the sepals attached.

== Taxonomy and naming ==
Kunzea clavata was first formally described in 1860 by the botanist Ferdinand von Mueller and the description was published in the work Fragmenta Phytographiae Australiae. The type specimen was collected in the Middle Mount Barren. The specific epithet (eriocalyx) is derived from the Ancient Greek words erion meaning "wool" and kalyx meaning "cup", "outer envelope of a flower" or sepals.

== Distribution and habitat ==
Often found among rocky outcrops of quartzite, K. eriocalyx grows in a small area on the coast at the boundary of the Great Southern and Goldfields-Esperance regions of Western Australia centred around the Fitzgerald River National Park where it grows in sandy clay soils of laterite.

== Conservation ==
Kunzea eriocalyx is classified as "Priority Two" by the Western Australian Government Department of Parks and Wildlife meaning that it is poorly known and from only one or a few locations.
