= Kunzea calida =

Scientific classification
- Kingdom: Plantae
- Clade: Tracheophytes
- Clade: Angiosperms
- Clade: Eudicots
- Clade: Rosids
- Order: Myrtales
- Family: Myrtaceae
- Genus: Kunzea
- Species: K. calida

Binomial name
- Kunzea calida F.Muell.

Species of shrub

Kunzea calida is a plant in the myrtle family, Myrtaceae and is endemic to Queensland, Australia. It is a spreading shrub which has linear to lance-shaped leaves but which are rolled, making them appear cylindrical. The flowers are pinkish-purple and arranged in groups near the ends of the branches in September. It is only known in remote and rugged areas of the Mount Stewart Ranges near Homestead.

== Description ==
Kunzea calida is a spreading shrub which grows to a height of about 3 m (10 ft) and has flaky bark. The leaves are mostly arranged in opposite pairs along the branches and are linear to lance-shaped but mostly rolled so that they are 3–8 mm (0.1–0.3 in) long and less than 1 mm (0.04 in) wide on a short petiole. The leaves are covered with short, silky hairs. The flowers are pinkish-purple and arranged in rounded groups of three to twelve flowers on the ends of the branches. There are linear to lance-shaped bracts which are 4–7 mm (0.2–0.3 in) long and 1–2 mm (0.04–0.08 in) wide and paired bracteoles at the base of each flower. The floral cup is 3–4 mm (0.1–0.2 in) long and hairy. The sepals are triangular, about 1.5 mm (0.06 in) long and hairy. The petals are oblong to egg-shaped with the narrower end towards the base, about 1 mm (0.04 in) long and there are 50 to 64 stamens in several rows. Flowering in occurs September and is followed by fruit which an almost spherical capsule.

== Taxonomy and naming ==
Kunzea calida was first formally described in 1867 by Ferdinand von Mueller and the description was published in Fragmenta phytographiae Australiae. The specific epithet (calida) is a Latin word meaning "warm" or "hot".

== Distribution and habitat ==
The distribution of this kunzea is poorly understood but it occurs in open areas of the Mount Stewart Ranges.

== Conservation ==
Kunzea calida is classified as "Endangered" under the Queensland Nature Conservation Act 1992.
