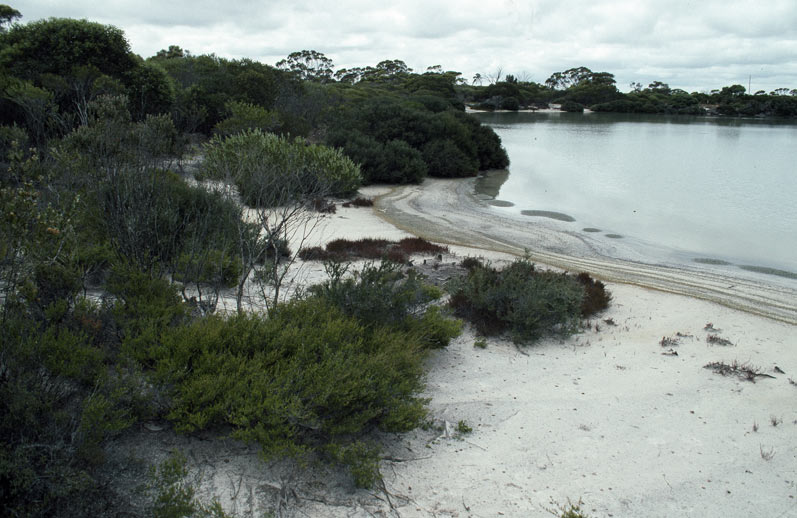
- Kunzea salina near Scaddan

Conservation status
- Priority Three — Poorly Known Taxa (DEC)

Scientific classification
- Kingdom: Plantae
- Clade: Tracheophytes
- Clade: Angiosperms
- Clade: Eudicots
- Clade: Rosids
- Order: Myrtales
- Family: Myrtaceae
- Genus: Kunzea
- Species: K. salina

Binomial name
- Kunzea salina (Trudgen & Keighery) de Lange & Toelken

Synonyms
- Angasomyrtus salina Trudgen & Keighery

= Kunzea salina =

Species of flowering plant

Kunzea salina is a species of flowering plant in the myrtle family, Myrtaceae and is endemic to the south of Western Australia. It is a low, spreading, densely branched shrub with leaves mostly arranged in opposite pairs and usually two sessile pale pink to white flowers arranged at the base of new shoots. It only grows near the edge of certain salt lakes.

== Description ==
Kunzea salina is a much-branched shrub that grows to a height of up to 0.4 m (1 ft 4 in) and spreads to about 2 m (6 ft 7 in) across. The leaves are mostly arranged in opposite pairs, linear to lance-shaped or elliptic, 3.5–6 mm (0.14–0.24 in) long and 0.5–1.5 mm (0.020–0.059 in) wide. The flowers are usually arranged in pairs, sometimes in groups of up to six at the base of new shoots. There are bracts and bracteoles at the base of the flowers and the floral cup is about 3 mm (0.12 in) long at flowering time. The sepal lobes are egg-shaped to triangular, 0.5–0.7 mm (0.020–0.028 in) long with a pointed tip. The petals are pale pink to white, broadly egg-shaped to almost round and about twice the size of the sepals. There are between sixteen and nineteen stamens arranged in two whorls. Flowering mainly occurs between November and February but depends on rainfall. The fruit is an urn-shaped capsule with the sepal lobes attached.

== Taxonomy and naming ==
This species was first formally described in 1983 by Malcolm Trudgen and Greg Keighery who gave it the name Angasomyrtus salina and published the description in the journal Nuytsia. The genus Angasomyrtus was named after the co-discoverer, Angas Hopkins, who is known for his work on the ecology and conservation of Western Australian flora. Following phylogenetic analyses of DNA sequences, Peter de Lange and Hellmut Toelken changed the name to Kunzea salina. The specific epithet (salina) refers to the saline habitat of this species.

== Distribution and habitat ==
Kunzea salina grows in white sand dunes over clay at the edges of small playa lakes north of Esperance in the Esperance Plains and Mallee biogeographic regions.
