= Kunzea sulphurea =

Scientific classification
- Kingdom: Plantae
- Clade: Tracheophytes
- Clade: Angiosperms
- Clade: Eudicots
- Clade: Rosids
- Order: Myrtales
- Family: Myrtaceae
- Genus: Kunzea
- Species: K. sulphurea

Binomial name
- Kunzea sulphurea Tovey & P.Morris

Species of shrub

Kunzea sulphurea is a flowering plant in the myrtle family, Myrtaceae and is endemic to Western Australia.

The erect and compact shrub or tree typically grows to a height of 1 to 3.5 metres (3 to 11 ft) but can reach as high as 6 metres (20 ft). It blooms between September and November producing yellow flowers.

Often found on dunes, ridge tops and seasonally wet flats in the South West and Great Southern regions of Western Australia where it grows in sandy soil types.
