= Kunzea strigosa =

Scientific classification
- Kingdom: Plantae
- Clade: Tracheophytes
- Clade: Angiosperms
- Clade: Eudicots
- Clade: Rosids
- Order: Myrtales
- Family: Myrtaceae
- Genus: Kunzea
- Species: K. strigosa

Binomial name
- Kunzea strigosa Toelken & G.F.Craig

Species of shrub

Kunzea strigosa is a flowering plant in the myrtle family, Myrtaceae and is endemic to Western Australia.

The shrub typically grows to a height of 1 to 2 metres (3 to 7 ft) with a few erect stems. It usually flowers August to November.

Often found in wet depressions between ridges or low on slopes in a small area on the coast near where the Great Southern meets the Goldfields-Esperance region centred around the Fitzgerald River National Park where it grows in a sandy to clay loam soils.
