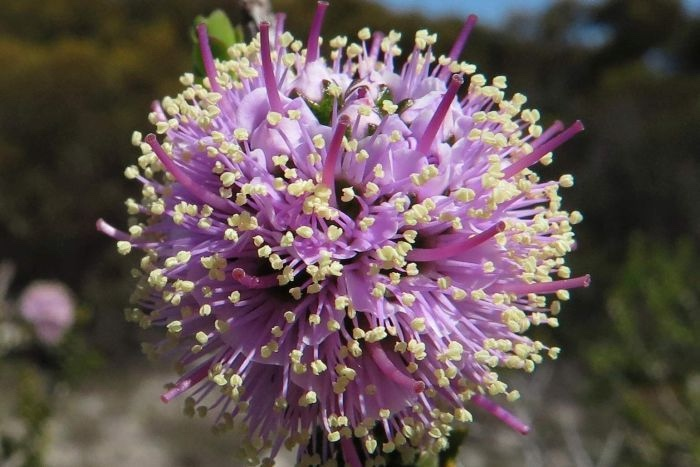
- Kunzea newbeyi in Monjebup Reserve

Conservation status
- Priority One — Poorly Known Taxa (DEC)

Scientific classification
- Kingdom: Plantae
- Clade: Tracheophytes
- Clade: Angiosperms
- Clade: Eudicots
- Clade: Rosids
- Order: Myrtales
- Family: Myrtaceae
- Genus: Kunzea
- Species: K. newbeyi

Binomial name
- Kunzea newbeyi Toelken

= Kunzea newbeyi =

Species of flowering plant

Kunzea newbeyi is a flowering plant in the myrtle family, Myrtaceae and is endemic to a small area along the south coast of Western Australia. It is a robust shrub with small leaves and groups of about twenty to thirty pink flowers in October and November.

== Description ==
Kunzea newbeyi is a robust shrub with several main stems and many side branches and which grows to a height of 0.6–2.3 m (2–8 ft). The leaves are glabrous, oblong to lance-shaped with the narrower end towards the base, 4–6 mm (0.16–0.24 in) long and about 2 mm (0.08 in) wide, not including the petiole which is a further 1–1.5 mm (0.04–0.06 in) long. The flowers are arranged in more or less spherical groups of 15 to 35, on the ends of branches which continue to grow after flowering. The flowers are surrounded by glabrous, egg-shaped bracts and bracteoles. The floral cup is about 4–5 mm (0.16–0.20 in) long and glabrous and the five sepals are egg-shaped to triangular and about 2 mm (0.08 in) long. The five petals are mid to deep pink, egg-shaped to almost round and 3–4 mm (0.1–0.2 in) long and there are about 40 to 50 stamens which are about twice as long as the petals. The style is 6.5–8 mm (0.26–0.31 in) long. Flowering occurs in October and November and is followed by fruit which are urn-shaped capsules with the sepals remaining as erect lobes.

== Taxonomy and naming ==
Kunzea newbeyi was first formally described by Hellmut R. Toelken in 1996 in the article A revision of the genus Kunzea (Myrtaceae) in the Journal of the Adelaide Botanic Garden. The specific epithet (newbeyi) honours Mr. K. Newbey who was the first to make a collection of this species.

== Distribution and habitat ==
This kunzea is often found on the dry lower slopes of breakaway areas in a small area along the southern coast in the Great Southern region.

== Conservation ==
Kunzea newbeyi is only known from five populations but has recently been discovered in large numbers in the Monjebup Reserve. It is classed as "Priority One" by the Government of Western Australia Department of Parks and Wildlife, meaning that it is known from only one or a few locations which are potentially at risk.
