= Kunzea truncata =

Conservation status
- Critically Endangered (NCA)

Scientific classification
- Kingdom: Plantae
- Clade: Tracheophytes
- Clade: Angiosperms
- Clade: Eudicots
- Clade: Rosids
- Order: Myrtales
- Family: Myrtaceae
- Genus: Kunzea
- Species: K. truncata

Binomial name
- Kunzea truncata Toelken, 2016

Species of flowering plant

Kunzea truncata is a species of shrub in the family Myrtaceae that is endemic to Queensland in Australia.

== Habitat ==
The species occurs in wet sclerophyll forest adjacent to the rainforests of the Wet Tropics.

== Distribution ==
The species has an extremely restricted distribution, with the two available location records being 359 metres apart in the catchment of Yamanie Creek, a tributary of the Herbert River. These records are located 35 kilometres from Cardwell.

== Description ==
The species has a perennial life cycle and is hermaphroditic. The species has dry, dehiscent, capsule fruit.

== Conservation ==
Under the Nature Conservation Act 1992 in Queensland it has been classified as Critically Endangered. The species has additionally been classified as a restricted plant under the Nature Conservation (Wildlife Management) Regulation 2006.
