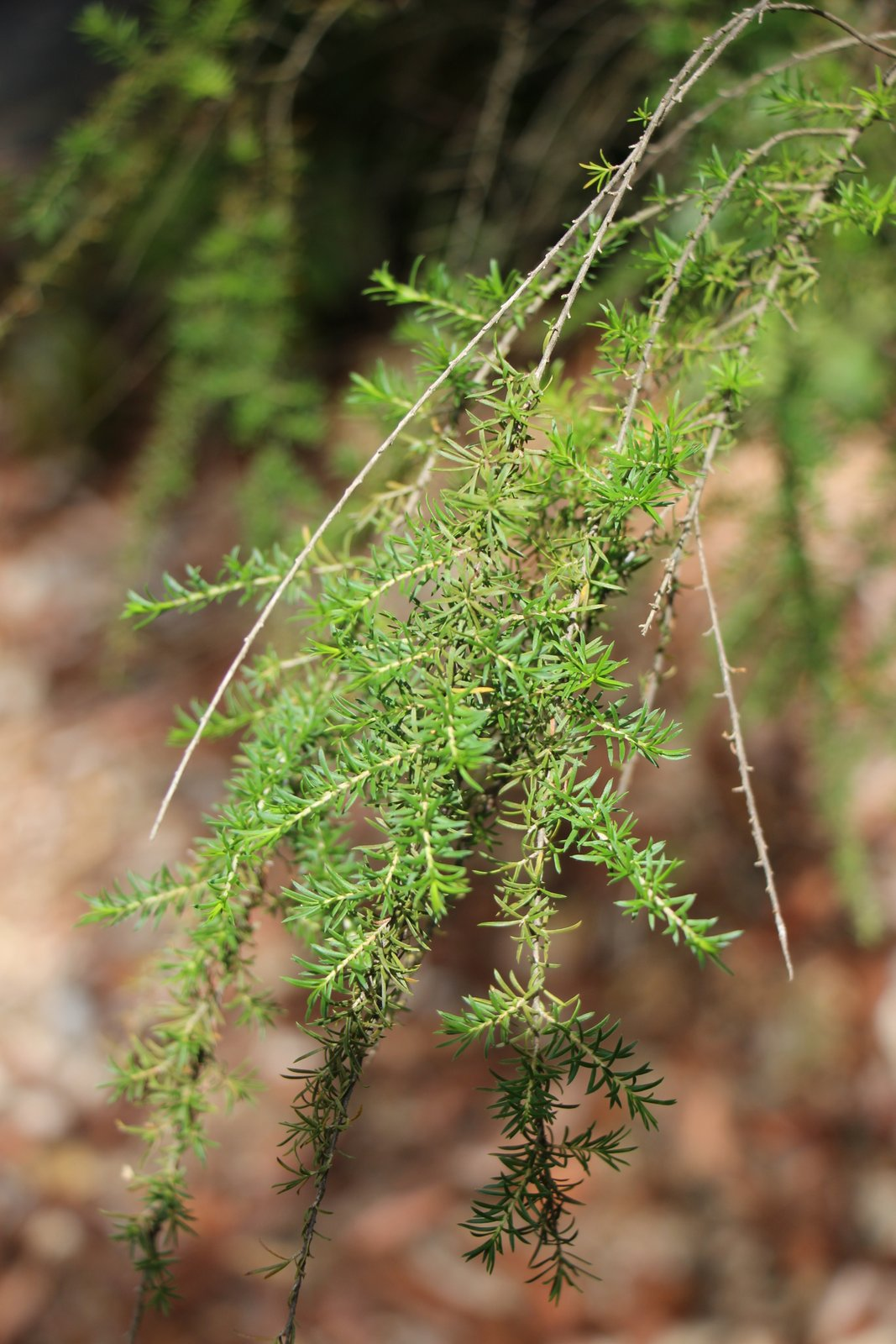
- In the North Coast Regional Botanic Garden, Coffs Harbour

Scientific classification
- Kingdom: Plantae
- Clade: Embryophytes
- Clade: Tracheophytes
- Clade: Spermatophytes
- Clade: Angiosperms
- Clade: Eudicots
- Clade: Rosids
- Order: Myrtales
- Family: Myrtaceae
- Genus: Kunzea
- Species: K. axillaris

Binomial name
- Kunzea axillaris Toelken

= Kunzea axillaris =

Species of shrub

Kunzea axillaris is a flowering plant in the myrtle family, Myrtaceae and is endemic to a small area of New South Wales. It is an erect shrub or tree with linear leaves and white flowers which are arranged singly in leaf axils. It is only known from the ranges on the north coast.

== Description ==
Kunzea axillaris is an erect shrub or tree which grows to a height of about 6 m (20 ft) with its branches hairy when young. The leaves are linear in shape, 3–5 mm (0.1–0.2 in) long, less than 1 mm (0.04 in) wide and glabrous when mature. The leaves taper towards the petiole and have a pointed end. The flowers are crowded on side branches or in the axils of upper leaves on a stalk up to 2 mm (0.08 in) long. The floral cup is glabrous, the sepal lobes are less than 0.5 mm (0.02 in) long and the petals are white, 1.0–1.5 mm (0.04–0.06 in) long. There are about thirty stamens which are 2–3.5 mm (0.08–0.1 in) long. Flowering occurs in January and the fruit are cup-shaped capsules which are 2–3 mm (0.08–0.1 in) long and about 1 mm (0.04 in) wide.

== Taxonomy and naming ==
Kunzea axillaris was first formally described in 2016 by Hellmut R. Toelken and the description was published in Journal of the Adelaide Botanic Garden. The specific epithet (axillaris) is a Latin word meaning "of an axil" referring to the flowers which appear singly in the leaf axils.

== Distribution and habitat ==
This kunzea grows in wet sclerophyll forest on the ranges between Taree and Kempsey.
