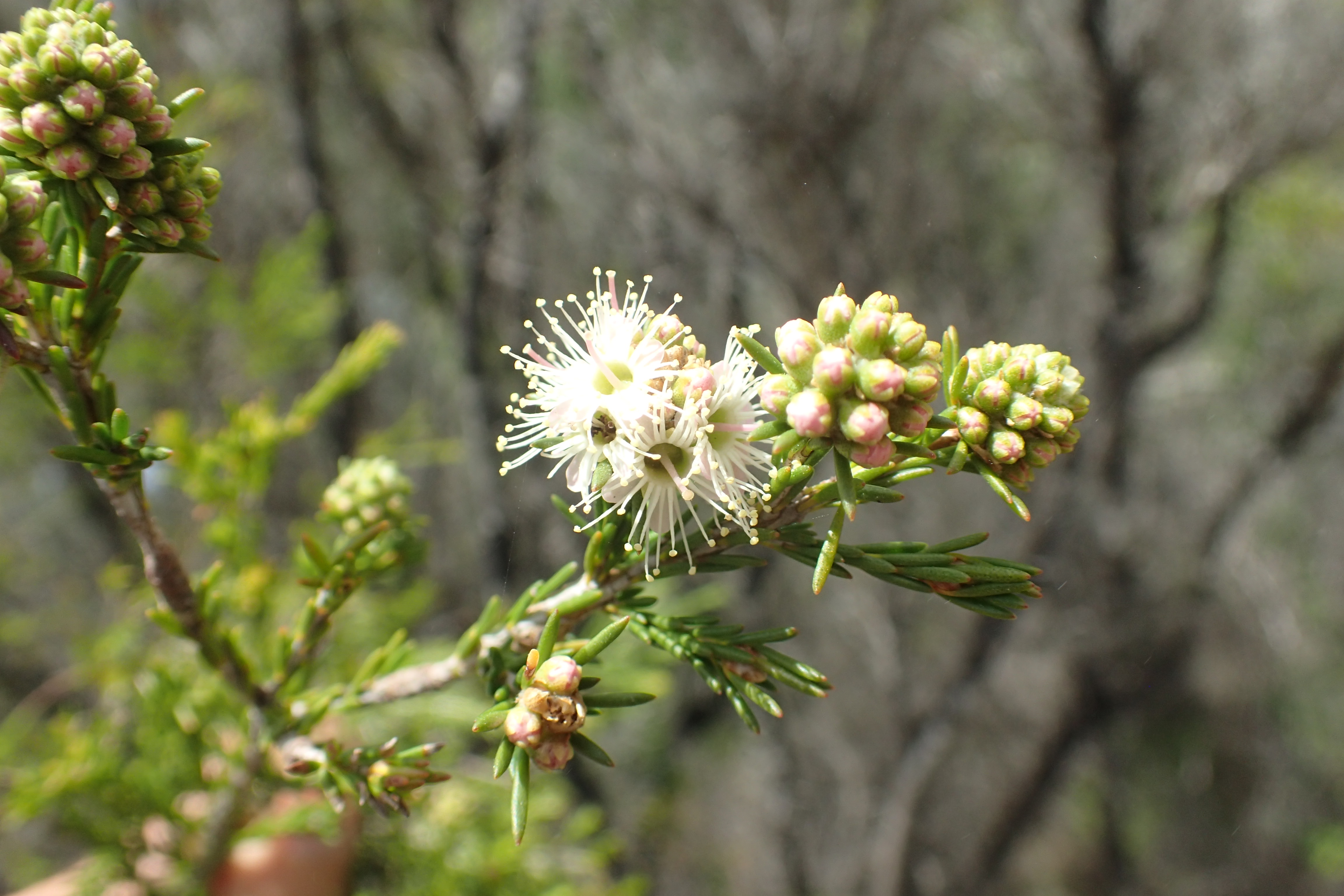
- Kunzea spathulata flowers and foliage

Scientific classification
- Kingdom: Plantae
- Clade: Embryophytes
- Clade: Tracheophytes
- Clade: Spermatophytes
- Clade: Angiosperms
- Clade: Eudicots
- Clade: Rosids
- Order: Myrtales
- Family: Myrtaceae
- Genus: Kunzea
- Species: K. spathulata

Binomial name
- Kunzea spathulata Toelken

= Kunzea spathulata =

Species of flowering plant

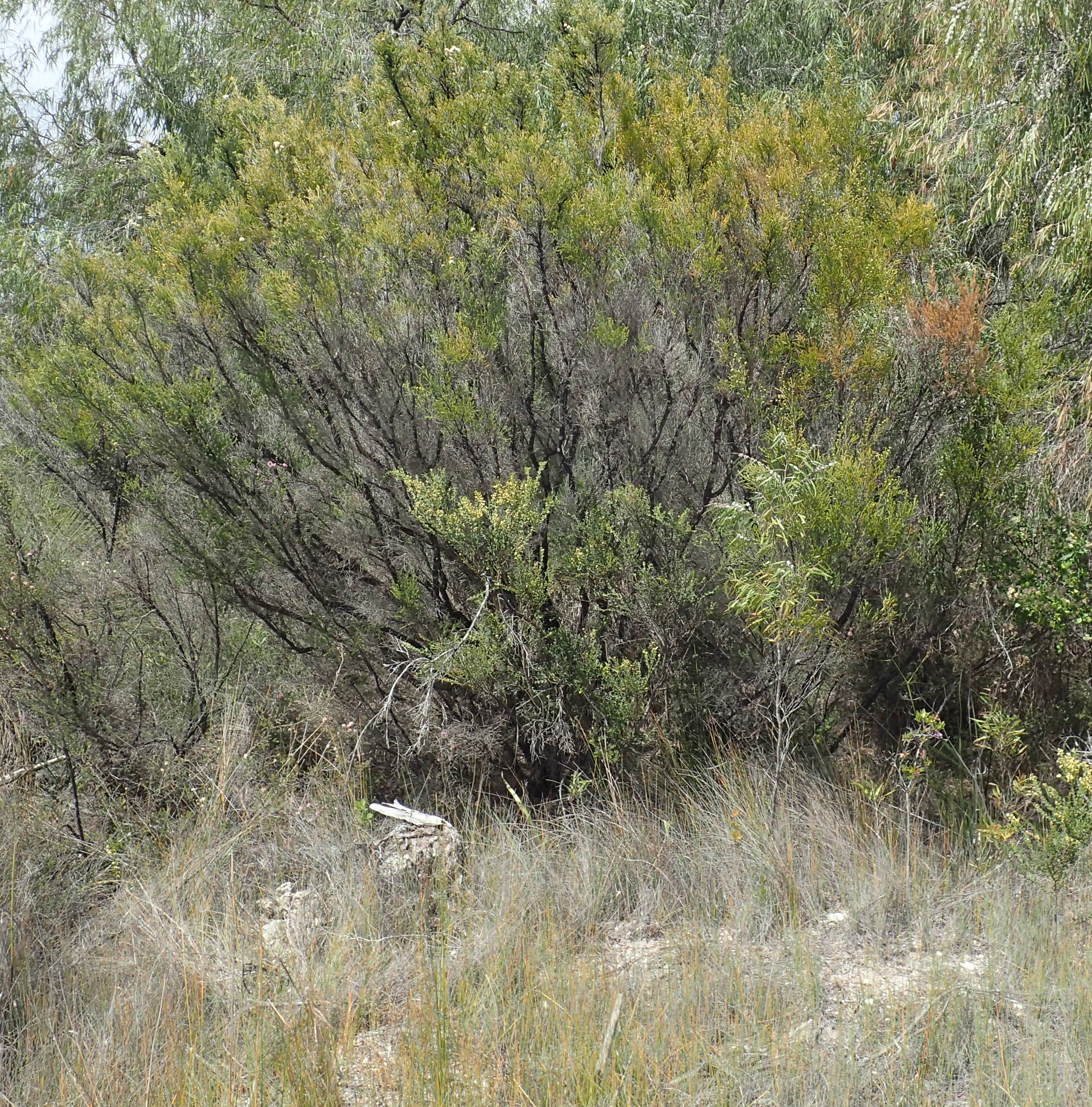
habit near Augusta

Kunzea spathulata is a species of flowering plant in the myrtle family, Myrtaceae and is endemic to a small area in the south west of Western Australia. It is a tall shrub with erect, much-branched stems, linear leaves and more or less spherical groups of yellow or yellowish green flowers.

== Description ==
Kunzea spathulata is a tall, glabrous shrub or small tree that typically grows to a height of 4.5 m (15 ft) with erect stems that have many ascending branches. The leaves are linear, 5–7 mm (0.20–0.28 in) long and about 0.5 mm (0.020 in) wide on a petiole 0.4–0.8 mm (0.016–0.031 in) long and more or less pressed against the stem. The flowers are arranged in more or less spherical groups of between ten and eighteen, mostly on the ends of the branches. There are egg-shaped bracts and pairs of bracteoles at the base of the flowers. The sepals are egg-shaped to triangular and 0.5–0.7 mm (0.020–0.028 in) long. The petals are yellow or yellowish green, egg-shaped to almost round and 1.6–2 mm (0.063–0.079 in) long. There are between 26 and 30 stamens 2.5–3 mm (0.098–0.118 in) long, in several whorls. Flowering occurs in October and November.

== Taxonomy and naming ==
Kunzea spathulata was first formally described in 1996 by Hellmut R. Toelken from a specimen collected near Nannup and the description was published in the Journal of the Adelaide Botanic Gardens. The specific epithet (spathulata) refers to the spatula-shaped bracteoles of this kunzea.

== Distribution and habitat ==
This kunzea is found around marshes and swampy areas, mainly near Augusta and Nannup.

== Conservation status ==
Kunzea spathulata is classified as "not threatened" by the Western Australian Government Department of Parks and Wildlife.
