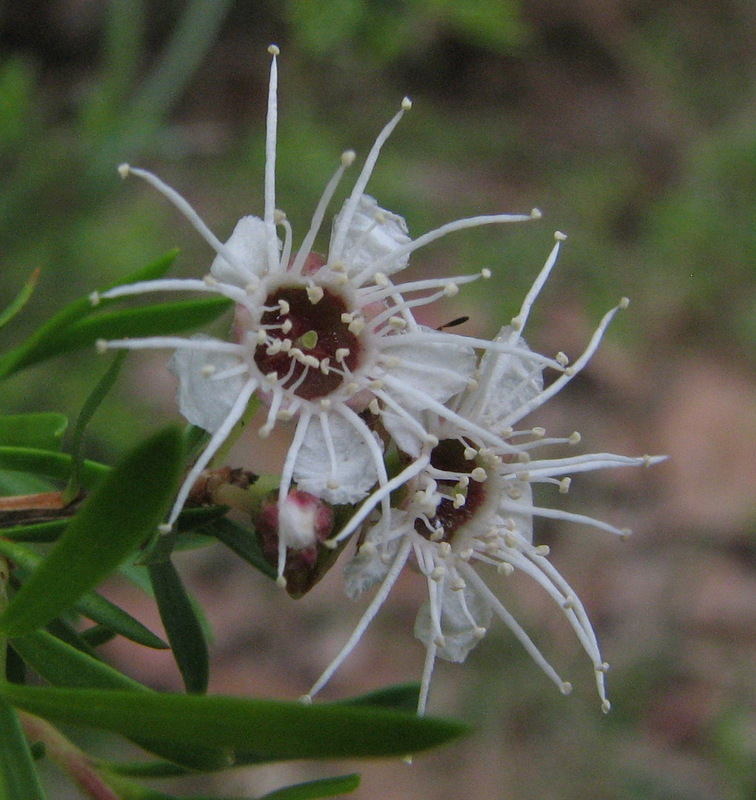
- Kunzea leptospermoides growing in Donvale

Scientific classification
- Kingdom: Plantae
- Clade: Tracheophytes
- Clade: Angiosperms
- Clade: Eudicots
- Clade: Rosids
- Order: Myrtales
- Family: Myrtaceae
- Genus: Kunzea
- Species: K. leptospermoides

Binomial name
- Kunzea leptospermoides F.Muell. ex Miq.

= Kunzea leptospermoides =

Yarra burgan

Species of flowering plant

Kunzea leptospermoides, commonly known as Yarra burgan, is a flowering plant in Myrtaceae, the myrtle family, and is endemic to Victoria, Australia. It is an erect shrub or small tree with narrow leaves and white flowers crowded near the ends of the branches in spring.

== Description ==
Kunzea leptospermoides is an erect shrub or small tree which grows to a height of 2–5 m (7–20 ft). The leaves are arranged alternately, narrow elliptic to lance-shaped with the narrower end towards the base, 7–25 mm (0.3–1 in) long and 1–2 mm (0.04–0.08 in) wide with a petiole about 0.5 mm (0.02 in) long. The flowers are white and crowded in leaf axils near the ends of the branches on pedicels 1–3 mm (0.04–0.1 in) long. The floral cup is about 3 mm (0.1 in) long and more or less glabrous. The sepal lobes are green with a reddish base, triangular and about 1 mm (0.04 in) long. The petals are white, almost round and about 2 mm (0.08 in) in diameter and there are 20-35 stamens which are up to 4 mm (0.2 in) long. Flowering occurs between September and December and is followed by fruit which is a capsule 3–4 mm (0.1–0.2 in) long and wide.

== Taxonomy and naming ==
Kunzea leptospermoides was first formally described in 1856 by Friedrich Miquel following an unpublished description by Ferdinand von Mueller. The description was published in Nederlandsch Kruidkundig Archief. The specific epithet (leptospermoides) refers to the similarity of this species to a Leptospermum. The ending -oides is a Latin suffix meaning "resembling" or "having the form of".

This kunzea was formerly included in Kunzea ericoides but that species is now regarded as a New Zealand endemic.

== Distribution and habitat ==
Yarra burgan grows near watercourses and in damp forest in the Yarra Valley.

== Uses ==
The wood was important to the Kulin people for making fighting implements and boomerangs.
