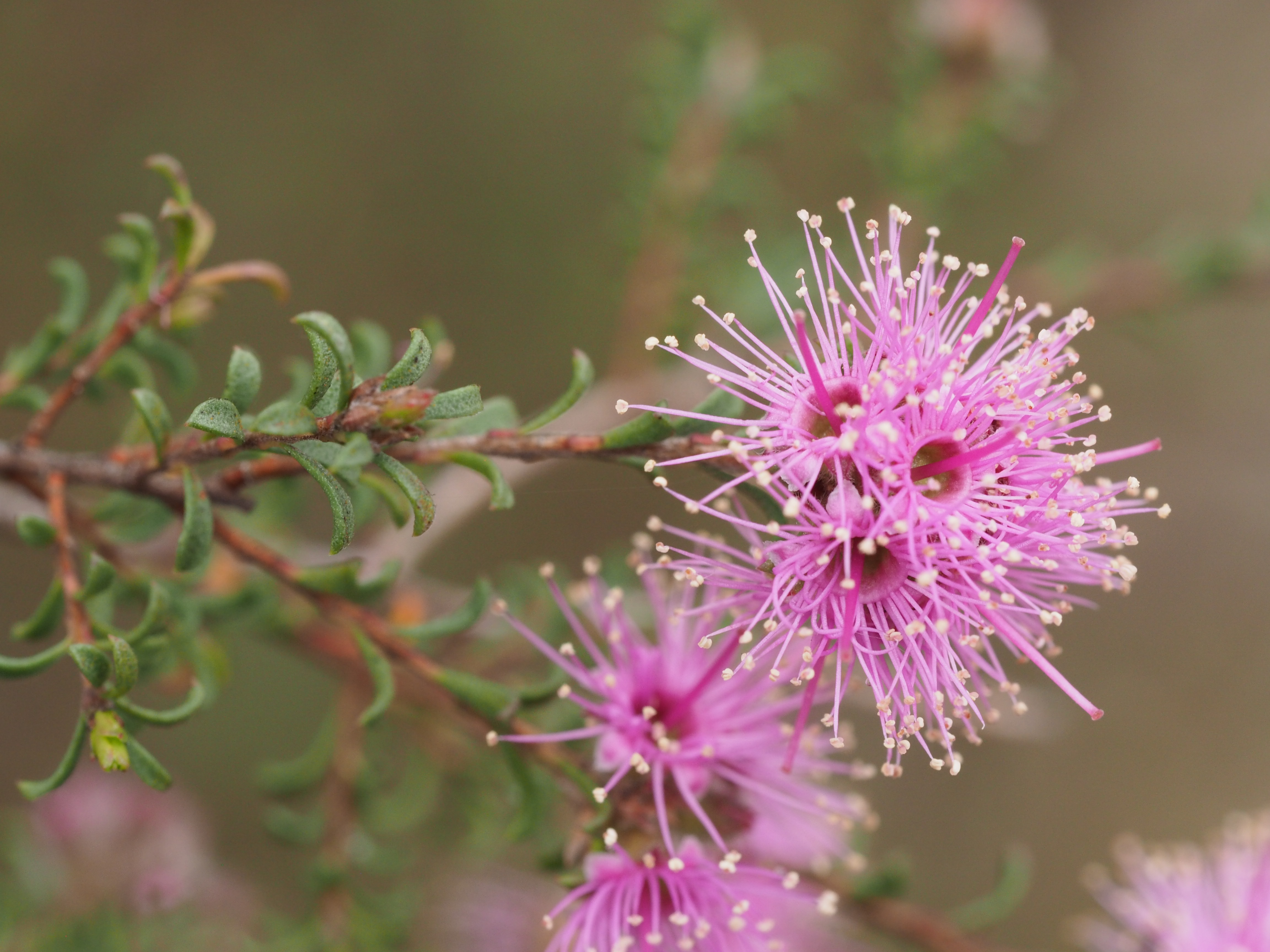
- Kunzea obovata growing in the Bolivia Hill Nature Reserve near Tenterfield

Scientific classification
- Kingdom: Plantae
- Clade: Tracheophytes
- Clade: Angiosperms
- Clade: Eudicots
- Clade: Rosids
- Order: Myrtales
- Family: Myrtaceae
- Genus: Kunzea
- Species: K. obovata

Binomial name
- Kunzea obovata Byrnes

= Kunzea obovata =

Species of shrub

Kunzea obovata is a flowering plant in the myrtle family, Myrtaceae and is endemic to eastern Australia. It is a spreading shrub with unusually-shaped leaves and clusters of pink to purple flowers. It is restricted to northern New South Wales and south-eastern Queensland.

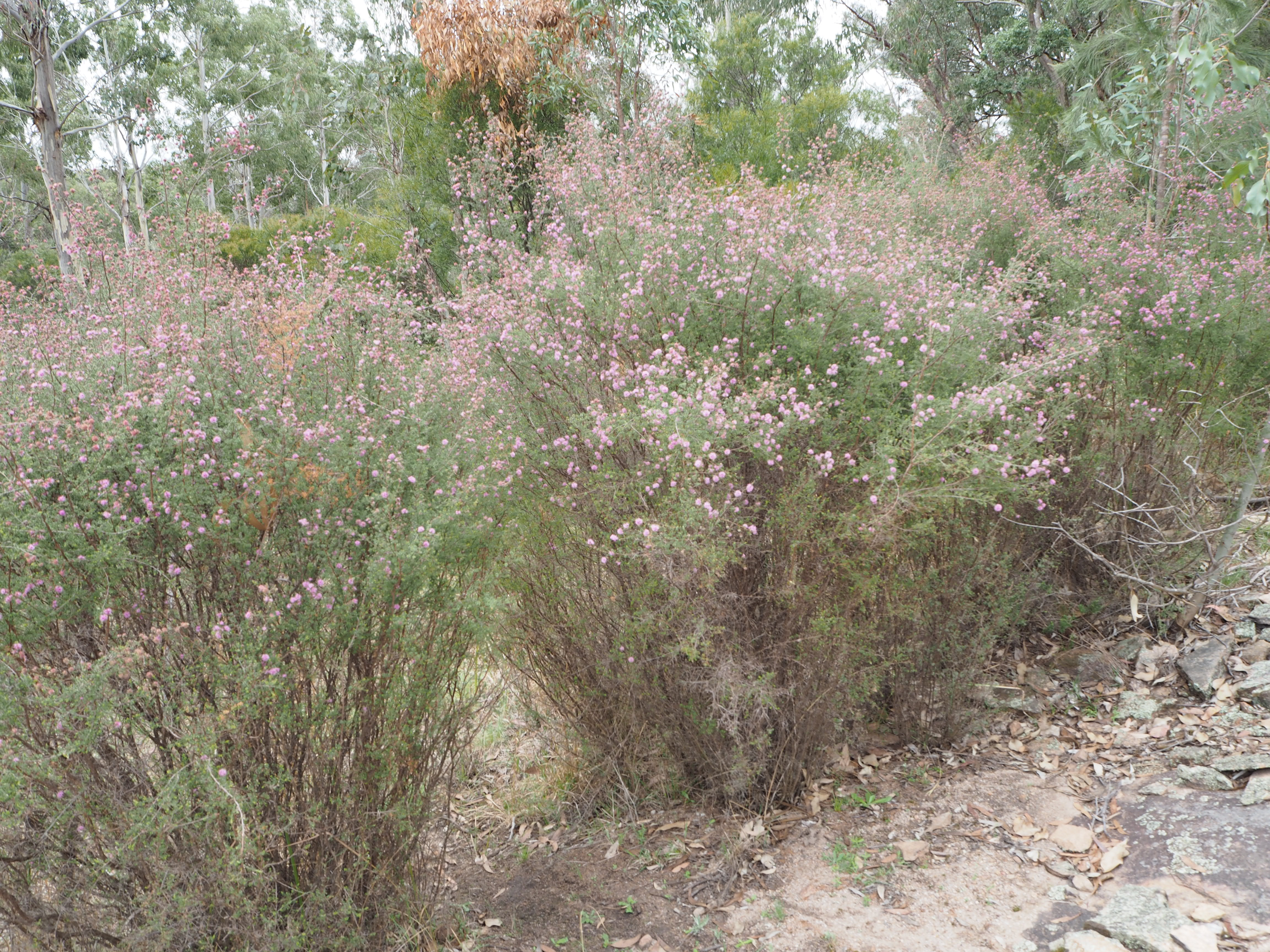
Kunzea obovata habit

== Description ==
Kunzea obovata is an erect, spreading shrub which grows to a height of up to 3 m (10 ft) with its branches silky hairy when young. The leaves are egg-shaped with the narrower end towards the base, have a dished upper surface and a down-turned tip. They are 3–9 mm (0.1–0.4 in) long, about 1 mm (0.04 in) wide with a petiole about 1 mm (0.04 in) long and are covered with soft hairs when young. The flowers are arranged in clusters of up to eighteen or more flowers on the ends of the branches. The floral cup is about 3 mm (0.1 in) long and hairy. The sepal lobes are broadly triangular, about 1 mm (0.04 in) long and pointed. The petals are deep purplish, sometimes pink, egg-shaped, about 2 mm (0.08 in) long and there 35 to 50 stamens which are 3–5 mm (0.1–0.2 in) long. The style is 4–6 mm (0.16–0.24 in) long. Flowering mostly occurs from September to November and the fruit are urn-shaped capsules which are 4–5 mm (0.16–0.20 in) long and about 3 mm (0.1 in) wide.

== Taxonomy and naming ==
Kunzea obovata was first formally described in 1982 by Norman Byrnes and the description was published in Journal of the Adelaide Botanic Garden. The specific epithet (obovata) is a Latin word meaning "egg-shaped".

== Distribution and habitat ==
This kunzea grows in forest in soils derived from granite, on the tablelands north from Deepwater. It is conserved in national parks including Girraween and Boonoo Boonoo National Parks.
