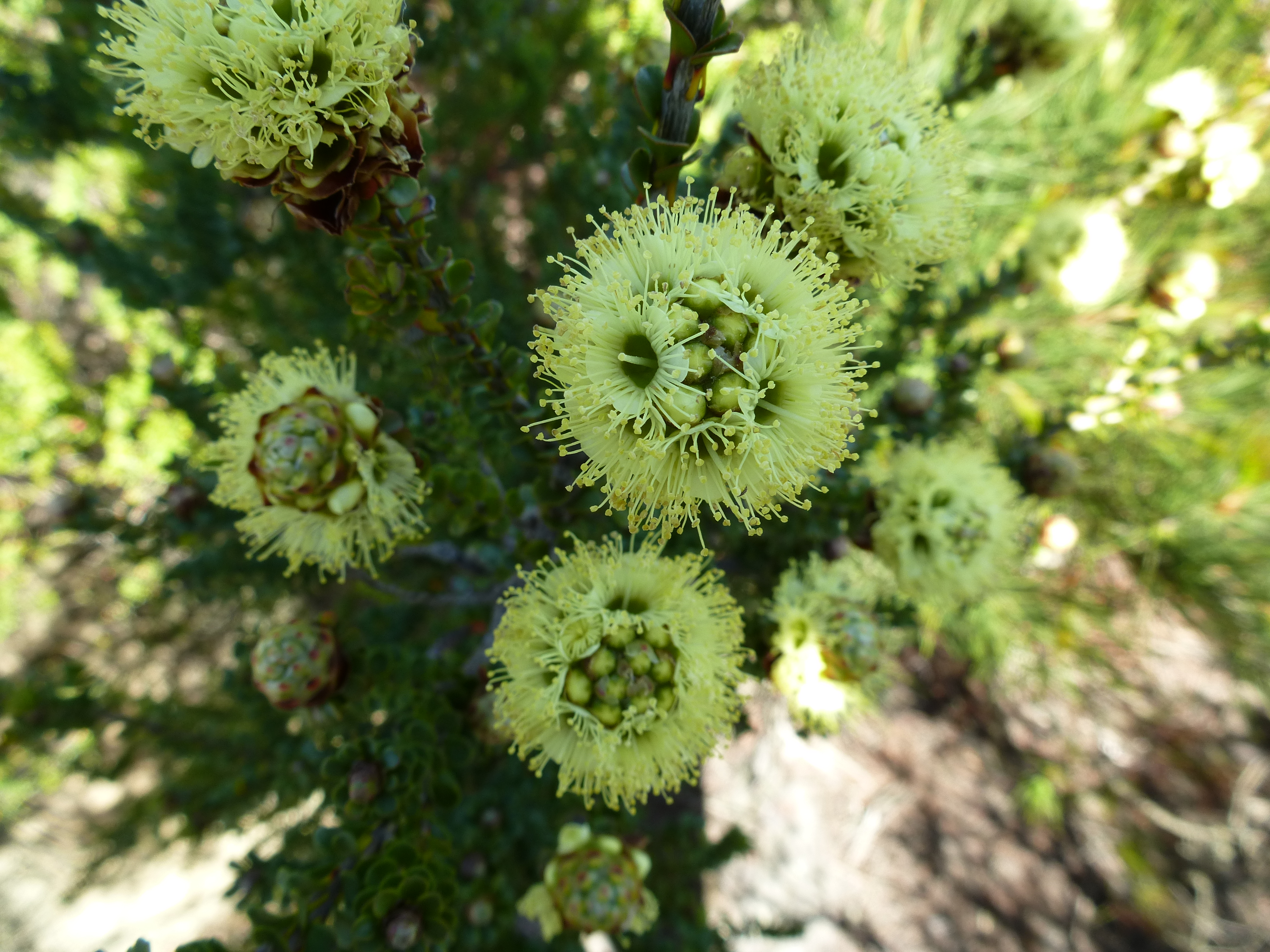
- Kunzea montana flowers

Conservation status
- Least Concern (IUCN 3.1)

Scientific classification
- Kingdom: Plantae
- Clade: Tracheophytes
- Clade: Angiosperms
- Clade: Eudicots
- Clade: Rosids
- Order: Myrtales
- Family: Myrtaceae
- Genus: Kunzea
- Species: K. montana

Binomial name
- Kunzea montana (Diels) Domin

= Kunzea montana =

Species of flowering plant

Kunzea montana, commonly known as mountain kunzea, is a flowering plant in the myrtle family, Myrtaceae and is endemic to the south-west of Western Australia. It is a shrub or small tree with more or less round leaves and heads of cream-coloured to pale yellow flowers on the ends of the branches in late spring. It is an uncommon species, growing on rocky mountain slopes, but all populations are conserved in the Stirling Range National Park.

== Description ==
Kunzea montana is a shrub, sometimes a small tree growing to a height of 2 m (7 ft), with rigid branches. The leaves are glabrous, egg-shaped to almost circular, mostly 2.5–4.5 mm (0.1–0.2 in) long and 3–5 mm (0.1–0.2 in) wide, not including the petiole which is a further 1–2 mm (0.04–0.08 in) long.

The flowers are arranged in spherical groups of 18 to 32, on the ends of branches which continue to grow after flowering. The flowers are cream-coloured to pale yellow and are surrounded by glabrous, egg-shaped bracts and bracteoles. The floral cup and sepals are each about 1 mm (0.04 in) long and the five petals are egg-shaped to almost round and 2–2.5 mm (0.08–0.1 in) long. There are about 50 to 70 stamens which are about twice as long as the petals and a style about 7 mm (0.28 in) long. Flowering occurs in October and November and is followed by fruit which are urn-shaped capsules about 6 mm (0.2 in) long.

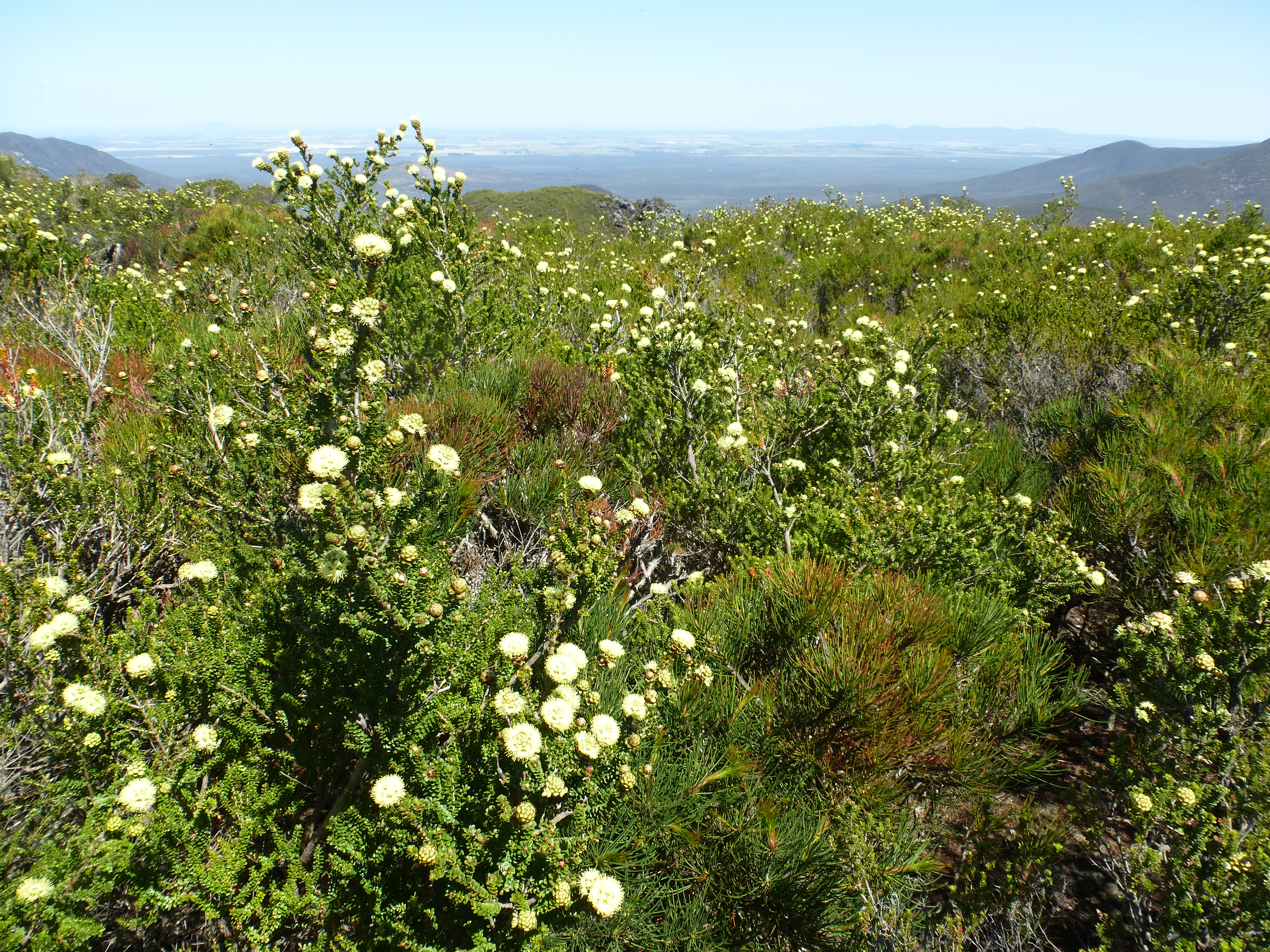
Kunzea montana growing on Mount Trio in the Stirling Range National Park

== Taxonomy and naming ==
This species was first formally described in 1904 by Ludwig Diels as a variety of Kunzea recurva and the description was published in Botanische Jahrbücher für Systematik, Pflanzengeschichte und Pflanzengeographie. In 1923, Karel Domin raised it to species status, publishing the change in Vestnik Kralovske Ceske Spolecnosti Nauk, Trida Matematiko-Prirodevedecke. The specific epithet (montana) is a Latin word meaning "of mountains".

== Distribution and habitat ==
Mountain kunzea only grows on rocky slopes and near rock outcrops in the Stirling Range National Park.

== Conservation ==
Kunzea montana is classified as "not threatened" by the Western Australian Government Department of Parks and Wildlife. Although uncommon, all populations are conserved in a national park.
