= Kunzea petrophila =

Scientific classification
- Kingdom: Plantae
- Clade: Tracheophytes
- Clade: Angiosperms
- Clade: Eudicots
- Clade: Rosids
- Order: Myrtales
- Family: Myrtaceae
- Genus: Kunzea
- Species: K. petrophila

Binomial name
- Kunzea petrophila Toelken

Species of shrub

Kunzea petrophila is a flowering plant in the myrtle family, Myrtaceae and is endemic to the Northern Territory. It is a spreading shrub with hairy branches and leaves, narrow leaves and cream-coloured flowers in more or less spherical groups, usually on the ends of the main branches.

== Description ==
Kunzea petrophila is a spreading shrub which usually grows to a height of 2 m (7 ft) with its young branches and leaves covered with often woolly hairs. The leaves are arranged alternately, linear to narrow lance-shaped, 6–9.5 mm (0.2–0.4 in) long about 1 mm (0.04 in) wide without a petiole. The flowers are arranged in groups of between ten and eighteen near the ends of the main branches, or in smaller groups on short side shoots. The flowers are sessile with bracts and bracteoles at the base of the flowers. The floral cup is hairy, about 3 mm (0.1 in) long when flowering with the sepal lobes 1–1.5 mm (0.04–0.06 in) long and pointed. The petals are cream-coloured, broadly egg-shaped to almost round and 1–1.5 mm (0.04–0.06 in) long. There are 40–46 stamens which are 0.5–1.5 mm (0.02–0.06 in) long. Flowering has been observed in May, August and November.

== Taxonomy and naming ==
Kunzea petrophila was first formally described in 2016 by Hellmut R. Toelken and the description was published in Journal of the Adelaide Botanic Garden. The specific epithet (petrophila) is derived from the Ancient Greek πέτρα (pétra) meaning "rock" or "stone" and φίλος (phílos) meaning "dear" or "beloved" referring to this species often growing on sandstone cliffs.

== Distribution and habitat ==
This kunzea grows in sand in sheltered sandstone crevices along the Keep River in the Keep River National Parkin the Northern Territory.
