= Kunzea acicularis =

Conservation status
- Declared rare (DEC)

Scientific classification
- Kingdom: Plantae
- Clade: Tracheophytes
- Clade: Angiosperms
- Clade: Eudicots
- Clade: Rosids
- Order: Myrtales
- Family: Myrtaceae
- Genus: Kunzea
- Species: K. acicularis

Binomial name
- Kunzea acicularis Toelken & G.F.Craig

Species of shrub

Kunzea acicularis is a flowering plant in the myrtle family, Myrtaceae and is endemic to the south-west of Western Australia. It is a shrub with a few erect stems, small and groups of three to five, pink to mauve flowers. It is a rare, recently described species only known from a small area near Ravensthorpe.

== Description ==
Kunzea acicularis is a shrub which grows to a height of up to 2 m (7 ft), with a few erect, irregularly-branched stems which are covered with fine hairs when young. The leaves are egg-shaped with the narrower end towards the base, densely hairy, 3.5–6 mm (0.1–0.2 in) long, about 2 mm (0.08 in) wide, with a stalk less than 1 mm (0.04 in) long.

Three to five pink to mauve flowers are arranged in groups on the ends of branches. The flowers are surrounded by hairy, narrow triangular bracts and bracteoles about 3 mm (0.1 in) long and 1 mm (0.04 in) wide. The sepals are about 2 mm (0.08 in) long and hairy and the five petals are 3–4 mm (0.1–0.2 in) long and almost round. There are about 26 stamens which are usually longer than the petals and a style 6–7 mm (0.24–0.28 in) long. Flowering occurs in October and November and is followed by fruit which are hairy urn-shaped capsules with the sepals attached.

== Taxonomy and naming ==
This species was first formally described in 2007 by Hellmut Toelken and Gil Craig and the description was published in Nuytsia. The specific epithet (acicularis) is a Latin word meaning "like a needle" referring to the needle-like bracts.

== Distribution and habitat ==
This kunzea grows in mallee and heath on hills and slopes north-east of Ravensthorpe in the Esperance Plains biogeographic region.

== Conservation ==
Kunzea acicularis is classified as "Threatened Flora (Declared Rare Flora — Extant)" by the Western Australian Government Department of Parks and Wildlife and an interim recovery plan has been prepared.
