= Kunzea cincinnata =

Scientific classification
- Kingdom: Plantae
- Clade: Tracheophytes
- Clade: Angiosperms
- Clade: Eudicots
- Clade: Rosids
- Order: Myrtales
- Family: Myrtaceae
- Genus: Kunzea
- Species: K. cincinnata

Binomial name
- Kunzea cincinnata Toelken

Species of flowering plant

Kunzea cincinnata is a flowering plant in the myrtle family, Myrtaceae and is endemic to a small area on the south coast of Western Australia. It is a shrub which typically grows to a height of 0.6 to 1 metre (2 to 3 ft) and blooms between September and October producing pink to red-purple flowers.

== Description ==
Kunzea cincinnata is a shrub with a few main stems and many shorter branches and which grows to a height of 0.6–1 m (2–3 ft). The leaves are linear to lance-shaped with the narrow end towards the base and 3–7 mm (0.1–0.3 in) long and less than 1 mm (0.04 in) wide with a leaf stalk is 0.5–1 mm (0.02–0.04 in) long. The flowers are arranged in groups of up to three on the ends of the shorter branches. The flowers are surrounded by hairy bracts 3–4.5 mm (0.1–0.2 in) long and shorter pairs of bracteoles. The floral cup is about 3 mm (0.1 in) and the five sepals are egg-shaped and hairy, about 1 mm (0.04 in) long. The five petals are 2.5–3 mm (0.098–0.12 in) long and pink to deep magenta and there are about thirty stamens which are slightly longer than the petals. Flowering occurs in September and October and is followed by fruit which are urn-shaped capsules.

== Taxonomy and naming ==
Kunzea cincinnata was first formally described in 1996 by Hellmut R. Toelken from a specimen collected near Ravensthorpe and the description was published in Journal of the Adelaide Botanic Gardens. The specific epithet (cincinnata) is a Latin word meaning "curly", referring to the hairs on the branches and leaves, distinguishing this species from the similar K. affinis.

== Distribution and habitat ==
This kunzea is often found on the mountain ranges in coastal areas of the Great Southern to Goldfields-Esperance regions of Western Australia centred around Fitzgerald River National Park where it grows in gravelly loam soils over laterite.

== Conservation ==
Kunzea cincinnata is classified as "not threatened" by the Western Australian Government Department of Parks and Wildlife.
