= Kunzea acuminata =

Scientific classification
- Kingdom: Plantae
- Clade: Tracheophytes
- Clade: Angiosperms
- Clade: Eudicots
- Clade: Rosids
- Order: Myrtales
- Family: Myrtaceae
- Genus: Kunzea
- Species: K. acuminata

Binomial name
- Kunzea acuminata Toelken

Species of flowering plant

Kunzea acuminata is a flowering plant in the myrtle family, Myrtaceae and is endemic to the south-west of Western Australia where it has a restricted distribution. It is a shrub with a few spindly branches, silky leaves and spherical groups of pink flowers on the ends of the branches.

== Description ==
Kunzea acuminata is a shrub which grows to a height of up to 2 m (7 ft), with a few spindly branches covered with long silky hairs when young. The leaf stalk is 1–1.5 mm (0.04–0.06 in) long and the leaf blade is linear to lance-shaped, 6–7.5 mm (0.2–0.3 in) long and about 1 mm (0.04 in) wide. The leaves have long, silky hairs along their margins. The flowers are arranged in roughly spherical heads containing eight to fifteen flowers on the ends of the branches which continue to grow after flowering. The flowers are surrounded by silky bracts 6–7 mm (0.2–0.3 in) and bracteoles 4–5 mm (0.16–0.20 in) long. The five sepals are egg-shaped, about 1–1.5 mm (0.04–0.06 in) and silky-hairy and the five petals are 1.5–2 mm (0.06–0.08 in) long and pink. There are about fifty stamens about 4.5 mm (0.2 in) long. Flowering occurs in September.

== Taxonomy and naming ==
This species was first formally described in 1996 by Hellmut Toelken and the description was published in Journal of the Adelaide Botanic Garden. The specific epithet (acuminata) is a Latin word meaning "pointed" or "sharpened".

== Distribution and habitat ==
This kunzea is only known from an area east of Israelite Bay where it grows in sandy soil over granite.

== Conservation ==
Kunzea acuminata is classified as "not threatened" by the Western Australian Government Department of Parks and Wildlife.
