= Kunzea caduca =

Scientific classification
- Kingdom: Plantae
- Clade: Tracheophytes
- Clade: Angiosperms
- Clade: Eudicots
- Clade: Rosids
- Order: Myrtales
- Family: Myrtaceae
- Genus: Kunzea
- Species: K. caduca

Binomial name
- Kunzea caduca Toelken

Species of shrub

Kunzea caduca is a plant in the myrtle family, Myrtaceae and is endemic to Queensland. It is a spreading shrub with linear to lance-shaped leaves and groups of white to cream-coloured flowers on the ends of all the branches from late winter to early spring. It is only known from a few locations and only conserved in the Castle Tower National Park near Gladstone.

== Description ==
Kunzea caduca is a spreading shrub which grows to a height of about 3 m (10 ft), although often much lower. The leaves are arranged alternately along the branches and are linear to lance-shaped with the narrower end towards the base, mostly 5–9 mm (0.2–0.4 in) long, 1–2 mm (0.04–0.08 in) wide on a petiole less than 1 mm (0.04 in) long. The leaves are more or less glabrous and more than sixty coarse glands are visible on the lower surface. The flowers are white to cream-coloured and are arranged in rounded groups of three to eight flowers on the ends of all the branches, each flower with a pedicel up to 1.5 mm (0.06 in) long. The floral cup is about 4 mm (0.2 in) long and glabrous. The sepals are broadly triangular to egg-shaped, ridged near their tips and glabrous. The petals are about 1.5 mm (0.06 in) long and there are 48 to 56 stamens in several rows with the outer row up to twice as long as the inner one. Flowering occurs in August and September and is followed by the fruit which is a cup-shaped capsule about 3 mm (0.1 in) long.

== Taxonomy and naming ==
Kunzea caduca was first formally described in 2016 by Hellmut Toelken and the description was published in Journal of the Adelaide Botanic Gardens. The specific epithet (caduca) is a Latin word meaning "falling" or "deciduous" referring to the bracts and bracteoles which fall off before the flower fully opens.

== Distribution and habitat ==
This kunzea grows on steep hills on mountains with intrusive rocks in woodland and shrubland in a few locations near Gladstone.
