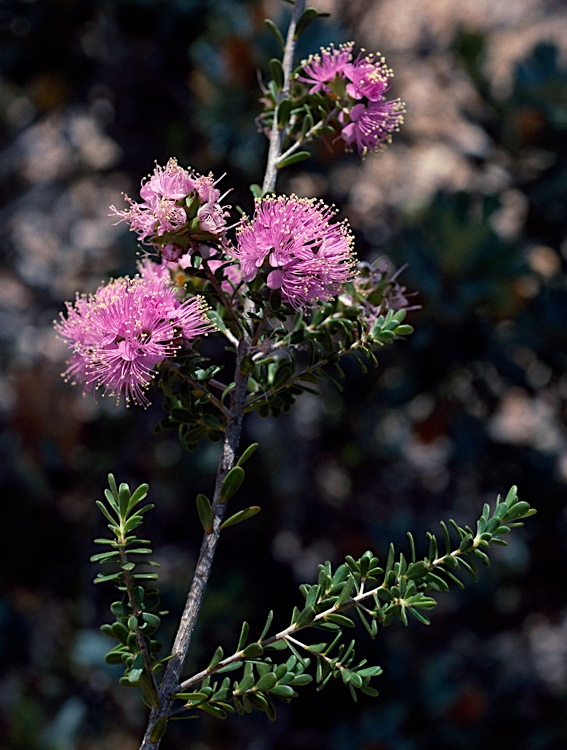
- Near Moora

Scientific classification
- Kingdom: Plantae
- Clade: Tracheophytes
- Clade: Angiosperms
- Clade: Eudicots
- Clade: Rosids
- Order: Myrtales
- Family: Myrtaceae
- Genus: Kunzea
- Species: K. praestans

Binomial name
- Kunzea praestans Schauer

= Kunzea praestans =

Species of shrub

Kunzea praestans is a flowering plant in the myrtle family, Myrtaceae and is endemic to Western Australia. It is an erect shrub with sessile leaves and groups of about fourteen to twenty pink flowers in more or less spherical groups on the end of the branches.

== Description ==
Kunzea praestans is a shrub with a few erect main stems and which usually grows to a height of 0.6–1.5 m (2–5 ft). The leaves are glabrous, oblong to lance-shaped with the narrower end towards the base, 4.5–7 mm (0.18–0.28 in) long and 1.5–3 mm (0.06–0.1 in) wide usually without a petiole. The flowers are arranged in more or less spherical groups of fourteen to twenty, often on the ends of branches which continue to grow after flowering. The flowers are surrounded by mostly glabrous, egg-shaped bracts and bracteoles. The floral cup is about 4–6 mm (0.16–0.24 in) long and the five sepals are egg-shaped, 1.5–2 mm (0.06–0.08 in) long. The five petals are deep pink to rose pink, egg-shaped with the narrower end towards the base and 3–3.5 mm (0.12–0.14 in) long. There are about seventy to ninety stamens and the stigma is wider than the style that is 5.5–8 mm (0.22–0.31 in) long. Flowering occurs in September and October and is followed by fruit which are urn-shaped capsules with the sepals remaining as erect lobes.

== Taxonomy and naming ==
Kunzea praestans was first formally described in 1844 by Johannes Conrad Schauer and the description was published in Johann Georg Christian Lehmann's book Plantae Preissianae. The specific epithet (praestans) is a Latin word meaning "preeminent", "distinguished", "superior" or "excellent".

== Distribution and habitat ==
This kunzea is often found on gravelly hillslopes of the Darling Scarp in the Wheatbelt region of Western Australia where it grows in lateritic soils.

== Conservation ==
Kunzea praestans is classified as "not threatened" by the Western Australian Government Department of Parks and Wildlife.
