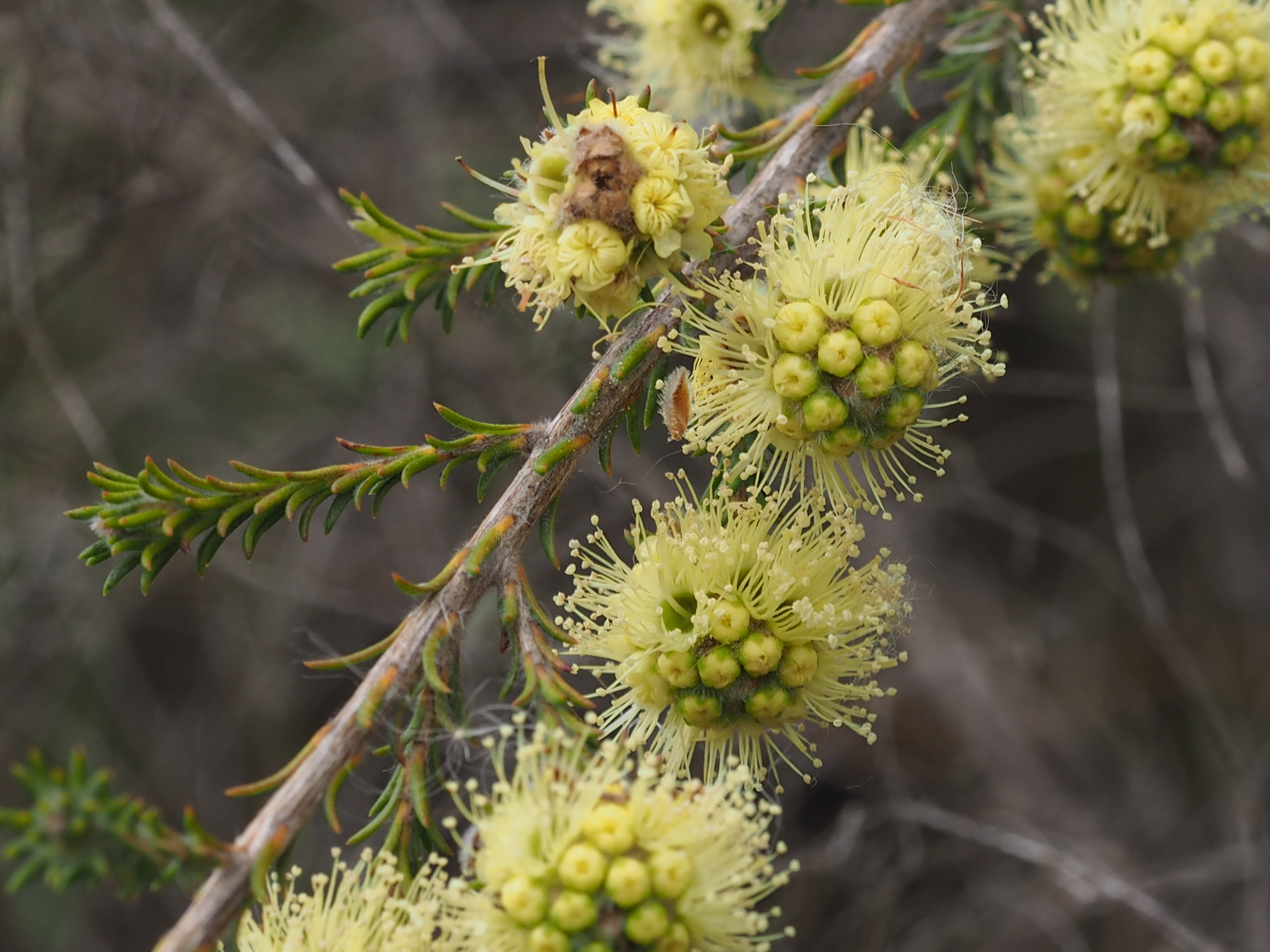
- Kunzea clavata in the Lake Powell Nature Reserve near Albany

Scientific classification
- Kingdom: Plantae
- Clade: Tracheophytes
- Clade: Angiosperms
- Clade: Eudicots
- Clade: Rosids
- Order: Myrtales
- Family: Myrtaceae
- Genus: Kunzea
- Species: K. clavata

Binomial name
- Kunzea clavata Toelken

= Kunzea clavata =

Torbay spearwood

Species of flowering plant

Kunzea clavata, commonly known as the Torbay spearwood, is a flowering plant in the myrtle family, Myrtaceae and is endemic to a small area on the south coast of Western Australia. It is a shrub or tree, typically with many branches and grows to a height of 2.5 to 4 metres (8 to 13 ft). It blooms between September and October producing yellow flowers.

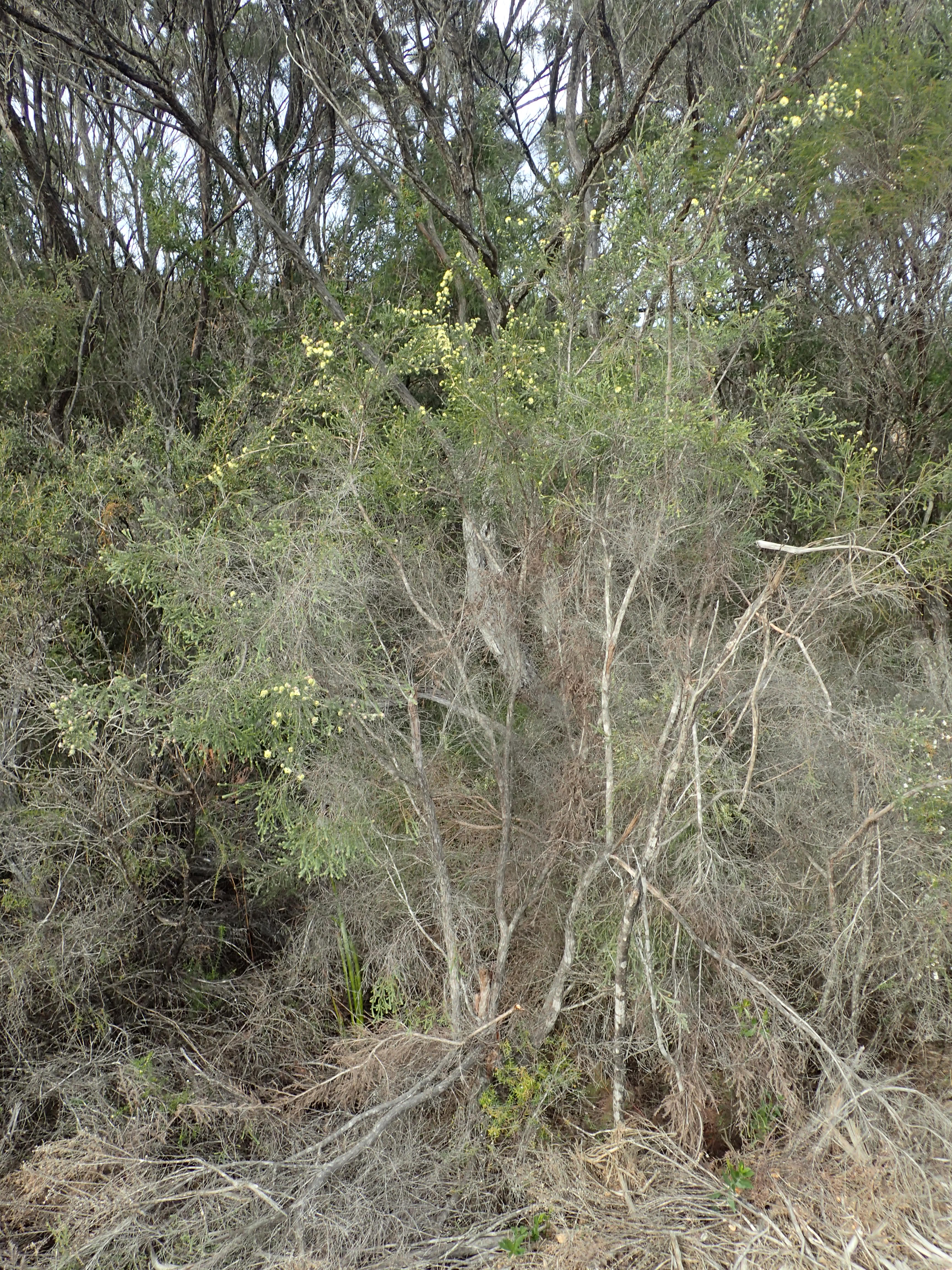
Its natural habit

== Description ==
Kunzea clavata is a shrub or tree with several main stems and many branches and which grows to a height of 2.5–4 m (8–10 ft). The leaves are linear, lance-shaped or shaped like a baseball bat, 2.5–4 mm (0.1–0.2 in) long and less than 1 mm (0.04 in) wide with a petiole less than 1 mm (0.04 in) long. The flowers are arranged in dense heads of 22 to 34 mainly on the ends of the longer branches. The flowers are surrounded by more or less glabrous bracts 3–3.5 mm (0.12–0.14 in) long and wide and shorter pairs of bracteoles. The floral cup is about 3 mm (0.1 in) long and the five sepals are triangular, glabrous and about 1 mm (0.04 in) long. The five petals are 1.5–2 mm (0.06–0.08 in) long and pale yellow and there 30-35 stamens. Flowering occurs in September and October and is followed by fruit which are urn-shaped capsules.

== Taxonomy and naming ==
Kunzea clavata was first formally described in 1996 by Hellmut R. Toelken from a specimen collected near Bornholm and the description was published in Journal of the Adelaide Botanic Gardens. The specific epithet (clavata) is derived from the Latin word meaning "clava", meaning "club" referring to the leaves often being shaped like a baseball bat.

== Distribution and habitat ==
Torbay spearwood is often found around marshes and on the margins of lakes in coastal areas of the Great Southern region of Western Australia centred around Albany in the Jarrah Forest and Warren biogeographic regions.

== Conservation ==
Kunzea clavata is classified as "not threatened" by the Western Australian Government Department of Parks and Wildlife.
