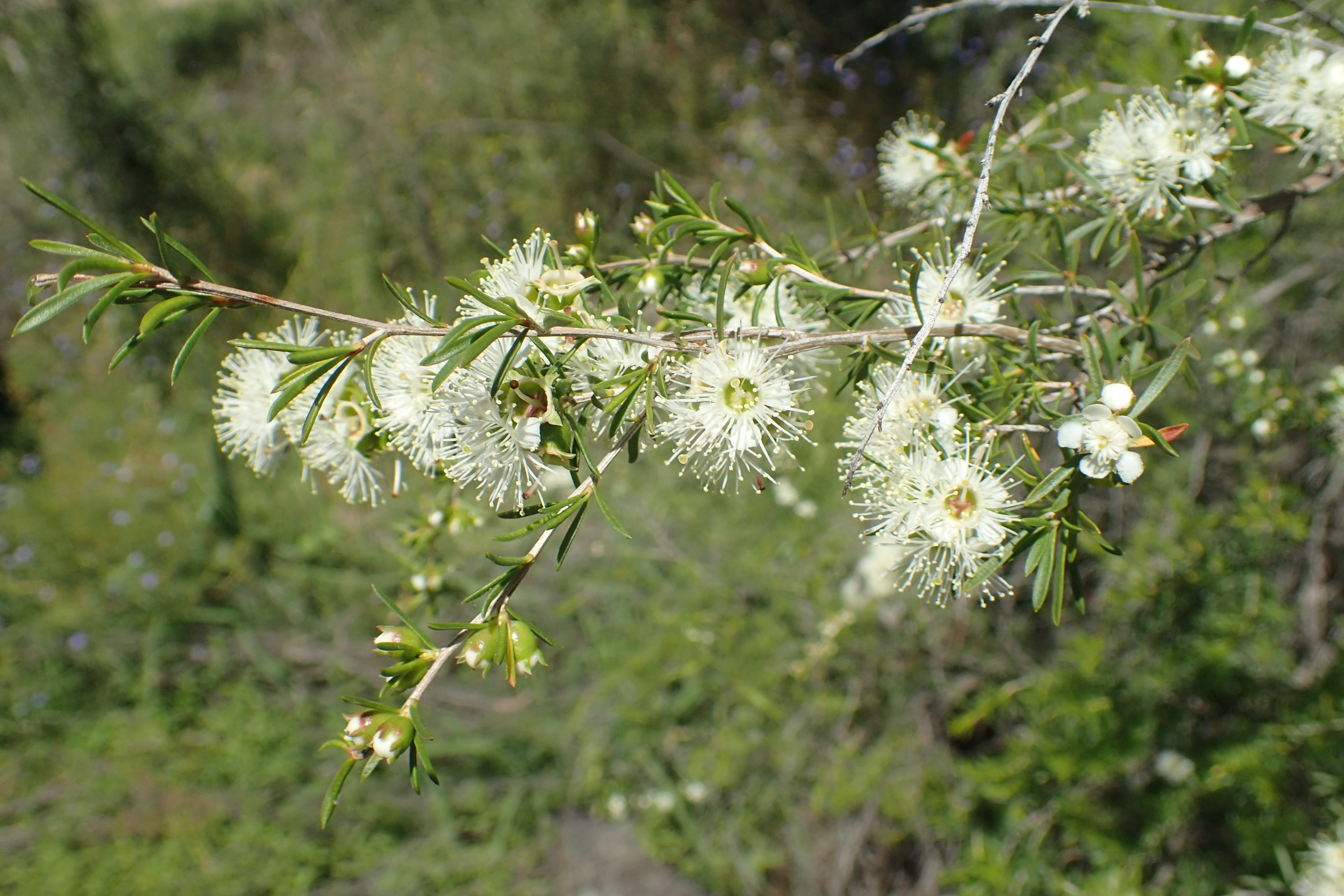

Scientific classification
- Kingdom: Plantae
- Clade: Tracheophytes
- Clade: Angiosperms
- Clade: Eudicots
- Clade: Rosids
- Order: Myrtales
- Family: Myrtaceae
- Genus: Kunzea
- Species: K. occidentalis

Binomial name
- Kunzea occidentalis Toelken

= Kunzea occidentalis =

Species of flowering plant

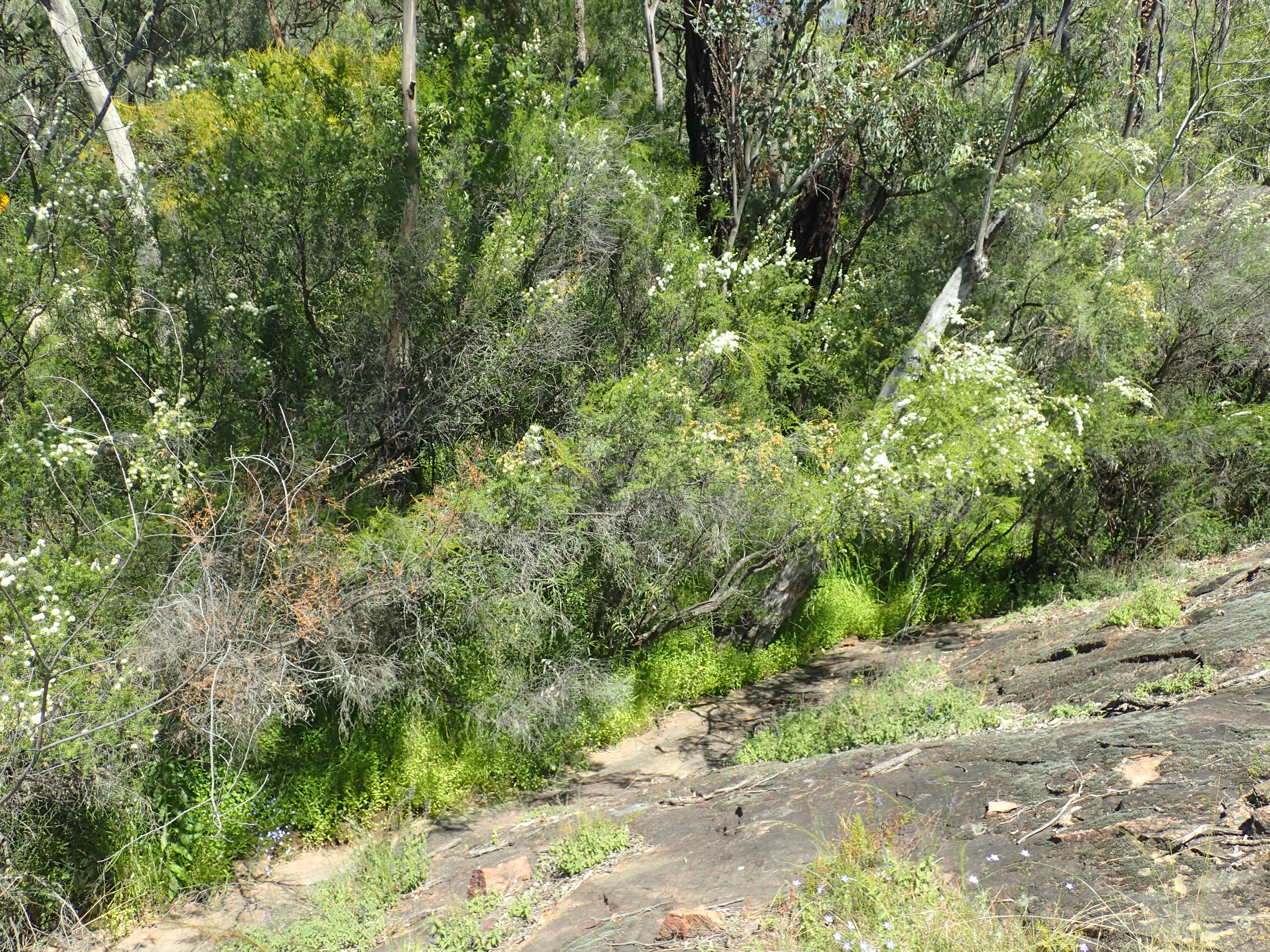
Habit in Mount Kaputar National Park

Kunzea occidentalis is a flowering plant in the myrtle family, Myrtaceae and is endemic to a western New South Wales. It is a shrub with narrow leaves and small groups of white flowers on leafy side-branches. It is distinguished from the similar Kunzea ambigua by the flanges on the sides of its young branches.

== Description ==
Kunzea occidentalis is a shrub which usually grows to a height of 1–2.5 m (3–8 ft) with its young branches having its leaf bases as raised, spongy, cream-coloured tissue. The leaves are arranged alternately, linear to narrow lance-shaped, 4–6.5 mm (0.2–0.3 in) long and about 1 mm (0.04 in) wide with a petiole usually less than 1 mm (0.04 in) long. The flowers are arranged singly or in groups of up to six near the ends of the branches. There are egg-shaped to elliptic bracts about 2 mm (0.08 in) long and 1 mm (0.04 in) wide and smaller paired bracteoles at the base of the flowers. The floral cup is glabrous and 3–4 mm (0.1–0.2 in) long with the sepal lobes 1–1.5 mm (0.04–0.06 in) long and glabrous. The petals are white, broadly egg-shaped to almost round and about 2–3 mm (0.08–0.1 in) long. There are about 50-60 stamens which are 2–5 mm (0.08–0.2 in) long. Flowering occurs in October and November.

== Taxonomy and naming ==
Kunzea occidentalis was first formally described in 2016 by Hellmut R. Toelken and the description was published in Journal of the Adelaide Botanic Garden. The specific epithet (occidentalis) is a Latin word meaning "western" referring to the distribution of this species on the western side of the Great Dividing Range.

== Distribution and habitat ==
This kunzea grows in heath and forest, mainly in rocky places and in creek beds. It is found on the western slopes of the Great Dividing Range and is common in the Warrumbungle and Mount Kaputar national parks.
