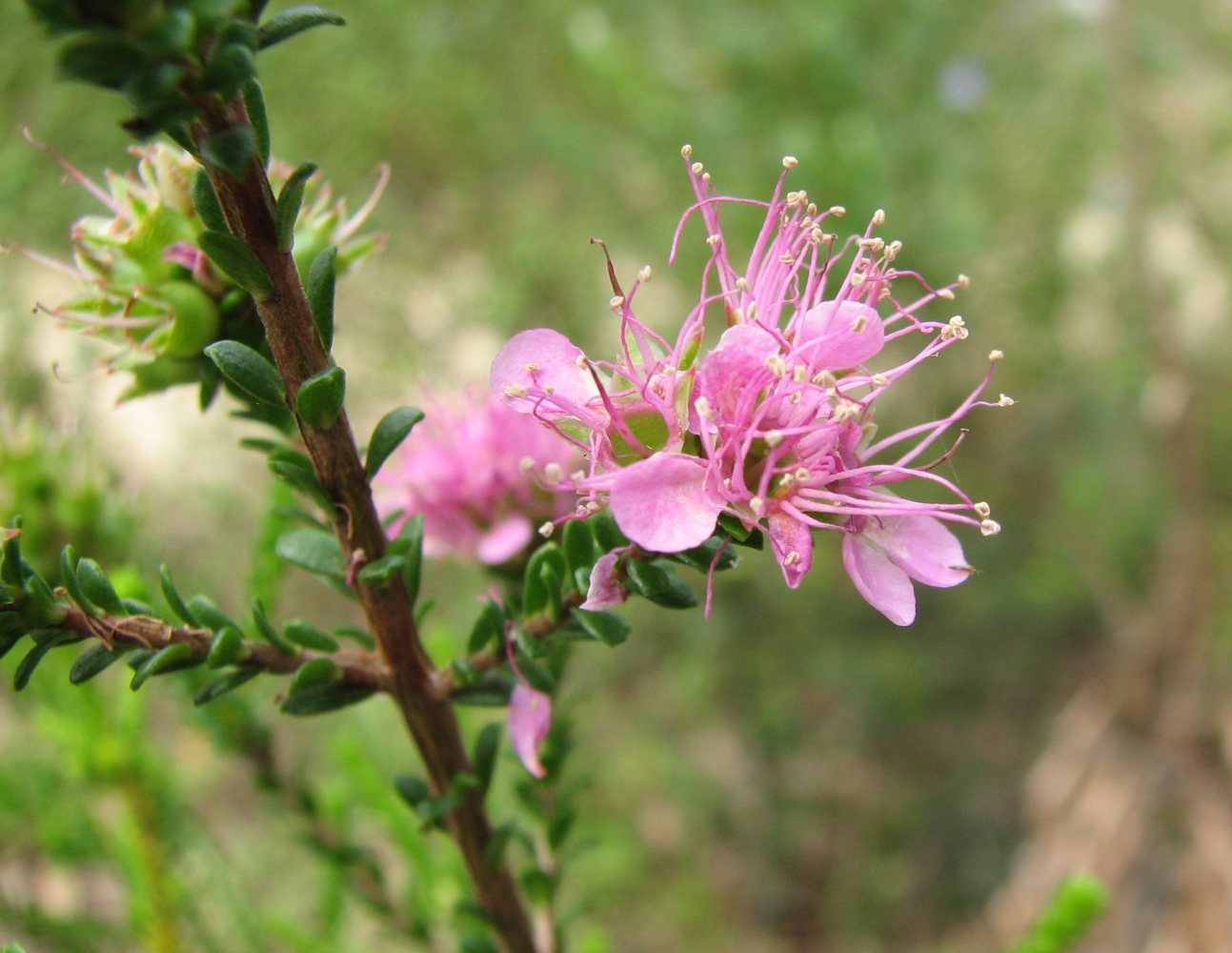
- Kunzea jucunda (cultivated) in the Maranoa Gardens

Scientific classification
- Kingdom: Plantae
- Clade: Tracheophytes
- Clade: Angiosperms
- Clade: Eudicots
- Clade: Rosids
- Order: Myrtales
- Family: Myrtaceae
- Genus: Kunzea
- Species: K. jucunda

Binomial name
- Kunzea jucunda Diels & E.Pritz.

= Kunzea jucunda =

Species of flowering plant

Kunzea jucunda is a flowering plant in the myrtle family, Myrtaceae and is endemic to the south-west of Western Australia where it occurs on sandy or rocky soils of undulating plains. It is similar to Kunzea affinis and where the ranges of the two species overlap, hybrids occur.

== Description ==
Kunzea jucunda is a shrub with a few erect main stems and many short side branches. It usually grows to a height of 0.6–1.2 m (2–4 ft) and is mostly glabrous except for a few hairs around the flowers and youngest leaves. The leaves are glabrous, mostly elliptic in shape, about 3 mm (0.1 in) long and 1–1.5 mm (0.04–0.06 in) wide with a petiole less than 1 mm (0.04 in) long. The flowers are arranged in heads of mostly two to four on the ends of the side branches. The flowers are surrounded by bracts which are about 2 mm (0.08 in) long and wide, mostly glabrous except for a few hairs around the edges and by pairs of smaller bracteoles. The floral cup is about 2–3 mm (0.08–0.1 in) long and the five sepals are lance-shaped, glabrous and about 1 mm (0.04 in) long. The five petals are spatula-shaped to almost round, about 2 mm (0.08 in) long and pink to deep mauve. There are eighteen to twenty four stamens in several rows in each flower. Flowering occurs mainly between August and October and is followed by fruit which are urn-shaped capsules with five vertical ridges. This kunzea is similar to K. affinis but is distinguished mainly by the mostly glabrous leaves and bracts. Where the ranges of the two species meet, hybrids often occur.

== Taxonomy and naming ==
Kunzea jucunda was first formally described in 1904 by Ludwig Diels and Ernst Georg Pritzel and the description was published in the journal Botanische Jahrbücher für Systematik, Pflanzengeschichte und Pflanzengeographie. The specific epithet (jucunda) is a Latin word meaning "pleasant, agreeable or delightful".

== Distribution and habitat ==
This kunzea grows in a wide range of habitats, but often occurs on sandy or rocky soils of undulating plains, mostly between the Stirling Range and Ravensthorpe in the Esperance Plains and Mallee biogeographic regions.

== Conservation ==
Kunzea jucunda is classified as "Not Threatened" by the Western Australian Government Department of Parks and Wildlife.
