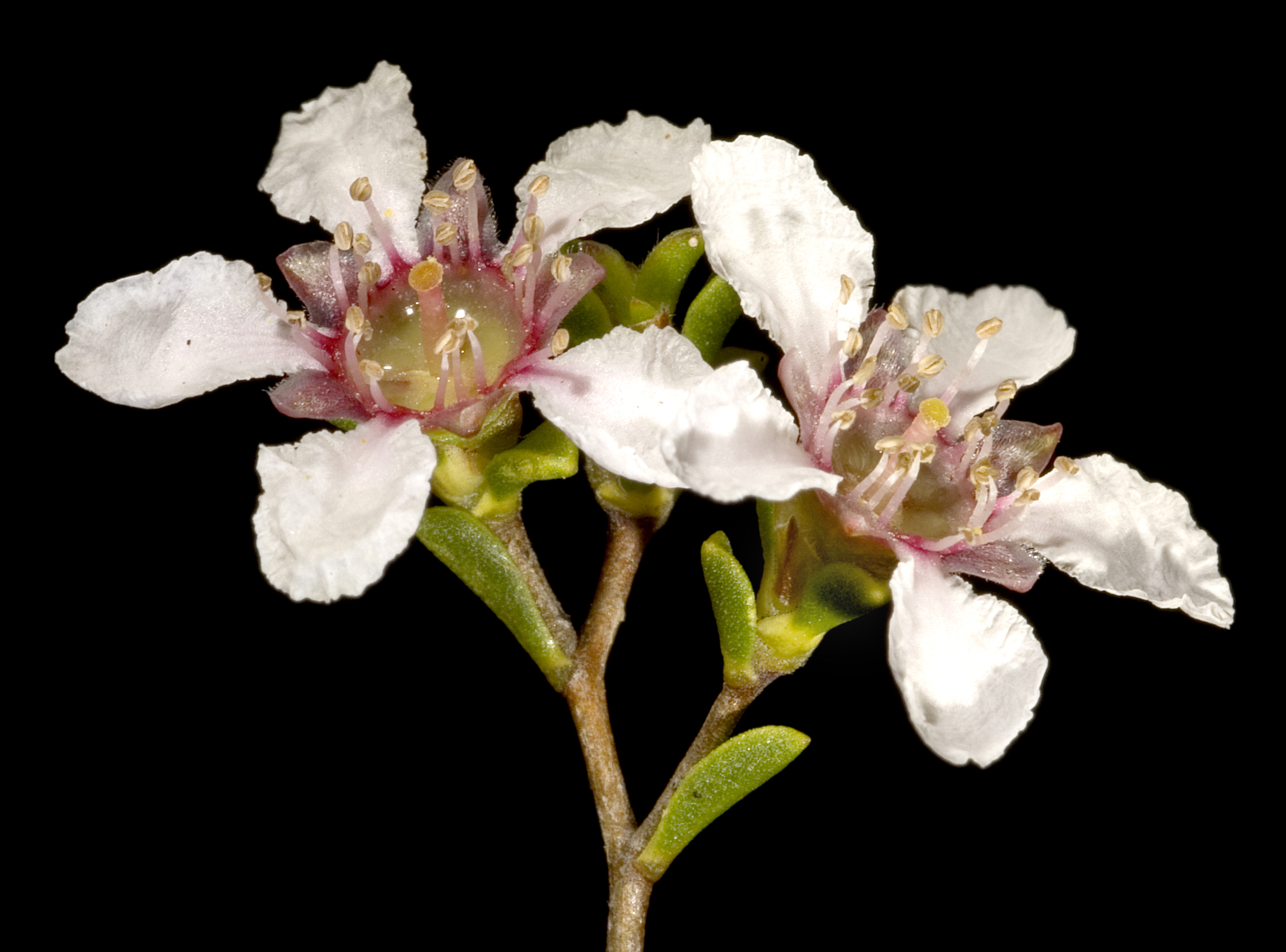
- Pericalymma ellipticum

Scientific classification
- Kingdom: Plantae
- Clade: Tracheophytes
- Clade: Angiosperms
- Clade: Eudicots
- Clade: Rosids
- Order: Myrtales
- Family: Myrtaceae
- Subfamily: Myrtoideae
- Tribe: Leptospermeae
- Genus: Pericalymma; Endl.

Synonyms
- Pericalymna Meisn.

= Pericalymma =

Genus of flowering plants

Pericalymma is a group of plants in the myrtle family Myrtaceae described as a genus in 1840. The entire genus is endemic to Western Australia.

Species

- Pericalymma crassipes (Lehm.) Schauer
- Pericalymma ellipticum (Endl.) Schauer
- Pericalymma megaphyllum Cranfield
- Pericalymma spongiocaule Cranfield

formerly included

now in Kunzea

- Pericalymma × roseum Turcz. - Kunzea × rosea (Turcz.) Govaerts
- Pericalymma teretifolium Turcz. - Kunzea pauciflora Schauer
