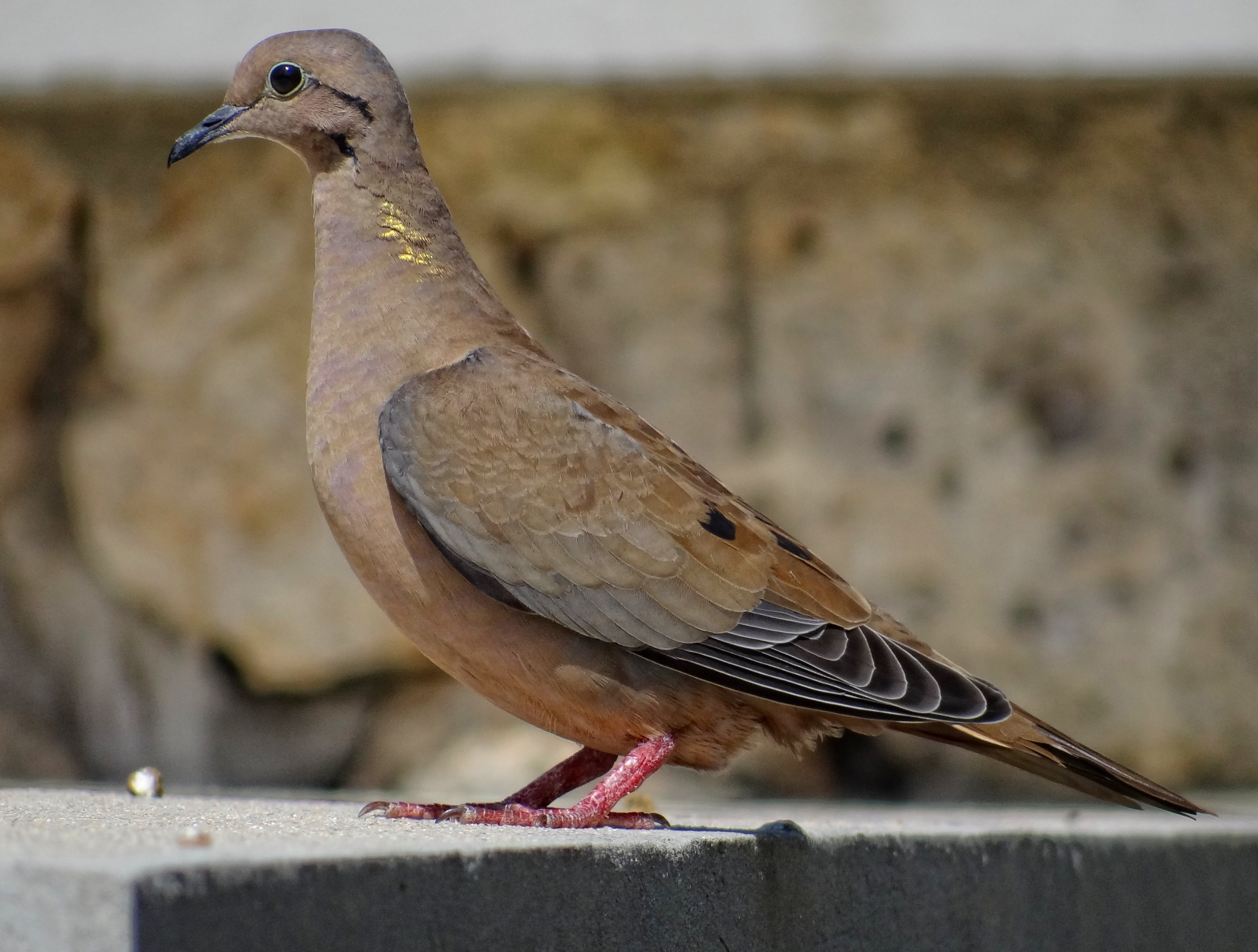
- In Oranjestad, Aruba

Conservation status
- Least Concern (IUCN 3.1)

Scientific classification
- Kingdom: Animalia
- Phylum: Chordata
- Class: Aves
- Order: Columbiformes
- Family: Columbidae
- Genus: Zenaida
- Species: Z. auriculata

Binomial name
- Zenaida auriculata (Des Murs, 1847)

= Eared dove =

Species of bird

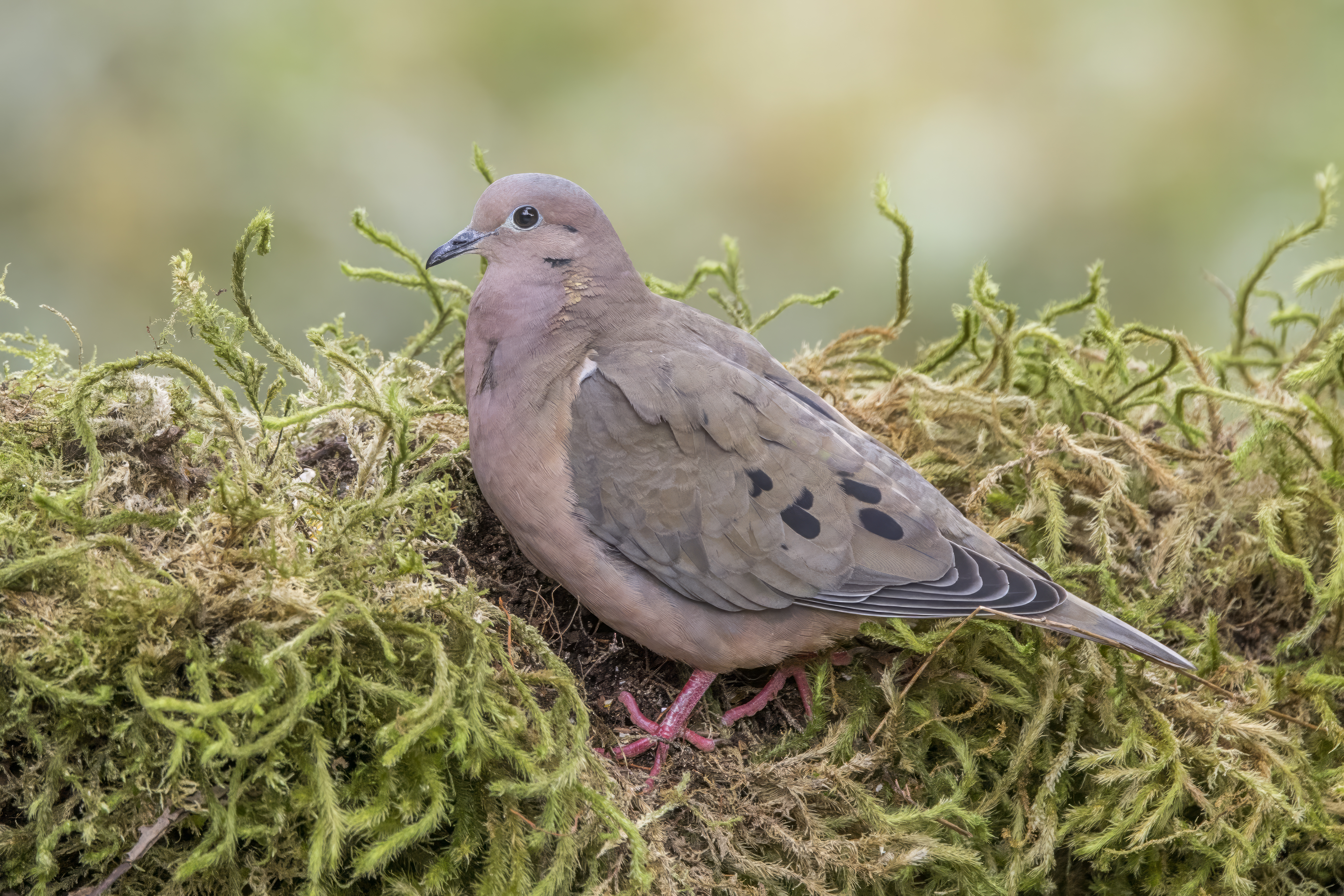
Z. a. antioquiae, Colombia

The eared dove (Zenaida auriculata) is a New World dove. It is a resident breeder throughout South America from Colombia to southern Argentina and Chile, and on the offshore islands from the Grenadines southwards. It may be a relatively recent colonist of Tobago and Trinidad. It appears to be partially migratory, its movements driven by food supplies.

It is a close relative of the North American mourning dove. With that species, the Socorro dove, and possibly the Galápagos dove, it forms a superspecies. The latter two are insular offshoots, the Socorro birds from ancestral mourning doves, and the Galápagos ones from more ancient stock.

== Description ==
- Zenaida
  - - White-winged dove (Z. asiatica)
    - West Peruvian dove (Z. meloda)
  - - Zenaida dove (Z. aurita)
    - - Eared dove (Z. auriculata)
      - - Socorro dove (Z. graysoni)
        - Mourning dove (Z. macroura)

Cladogram showing the relationships of six species of doves in the genus Zenaida. This study did not include the Galápagos dove (Z. galapagoensis).

The eared dove is 24 cm (9.4 in) long with a long, wedge-shaped tail, and weighs normally about 112 g (4.0 oz). Adult males have mainly olive-brown upperpart plumage, with black spots on the wings. The head has a grey crown, black line behind the eye, and the blue-black on the lower ear coverts. These black markings give the species its English and specific names. The underparts are vinous, and the tail is tipped with cinnamon. The bill is black and the legs dark red.

The female is duller than the male, and immature birds are greyish-brown, very dull, with pale barring. The species' call is a deep soft oo-ah-oo.

== Ecology ==
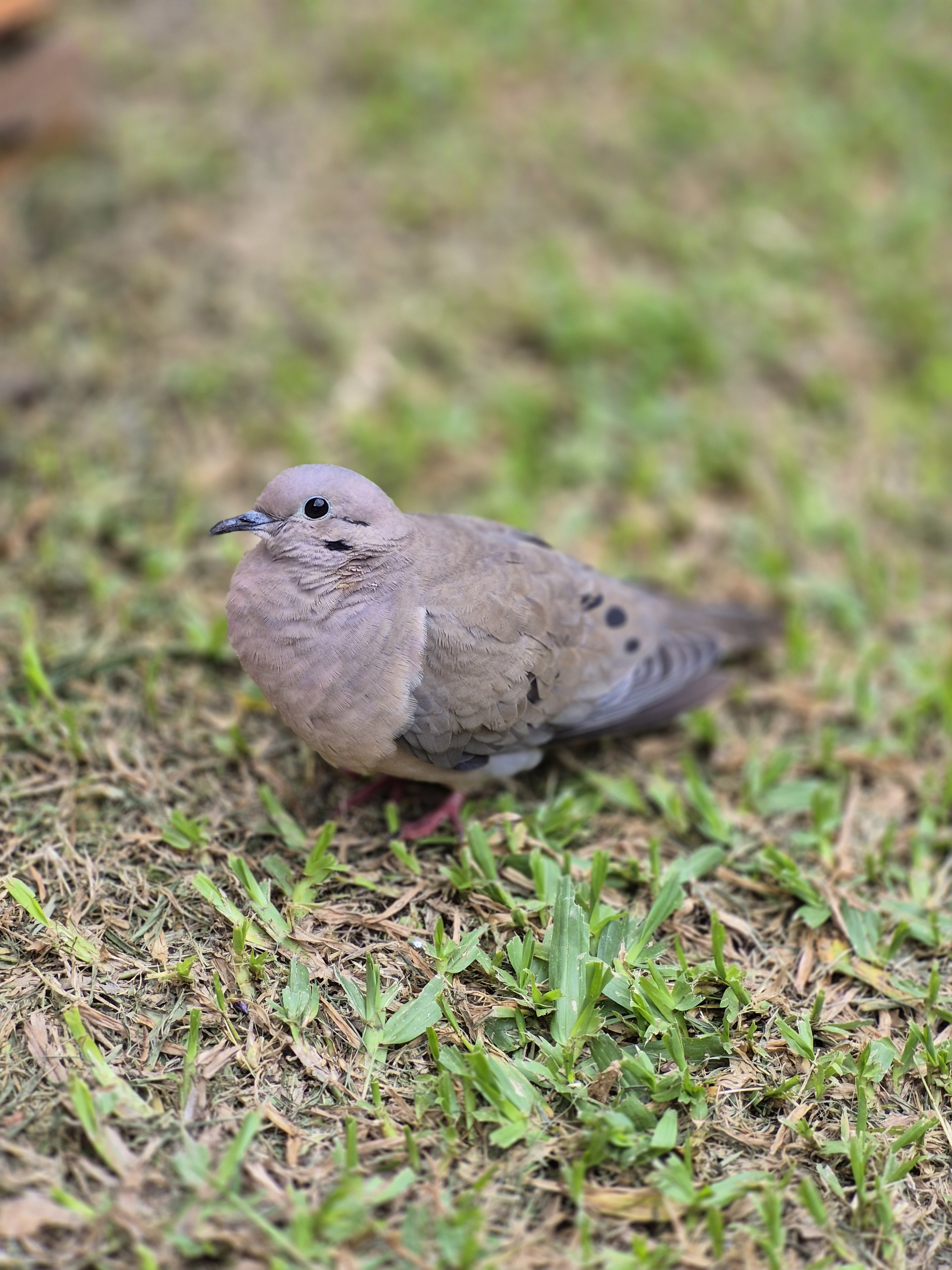
In southern Brazil, in the pampa region

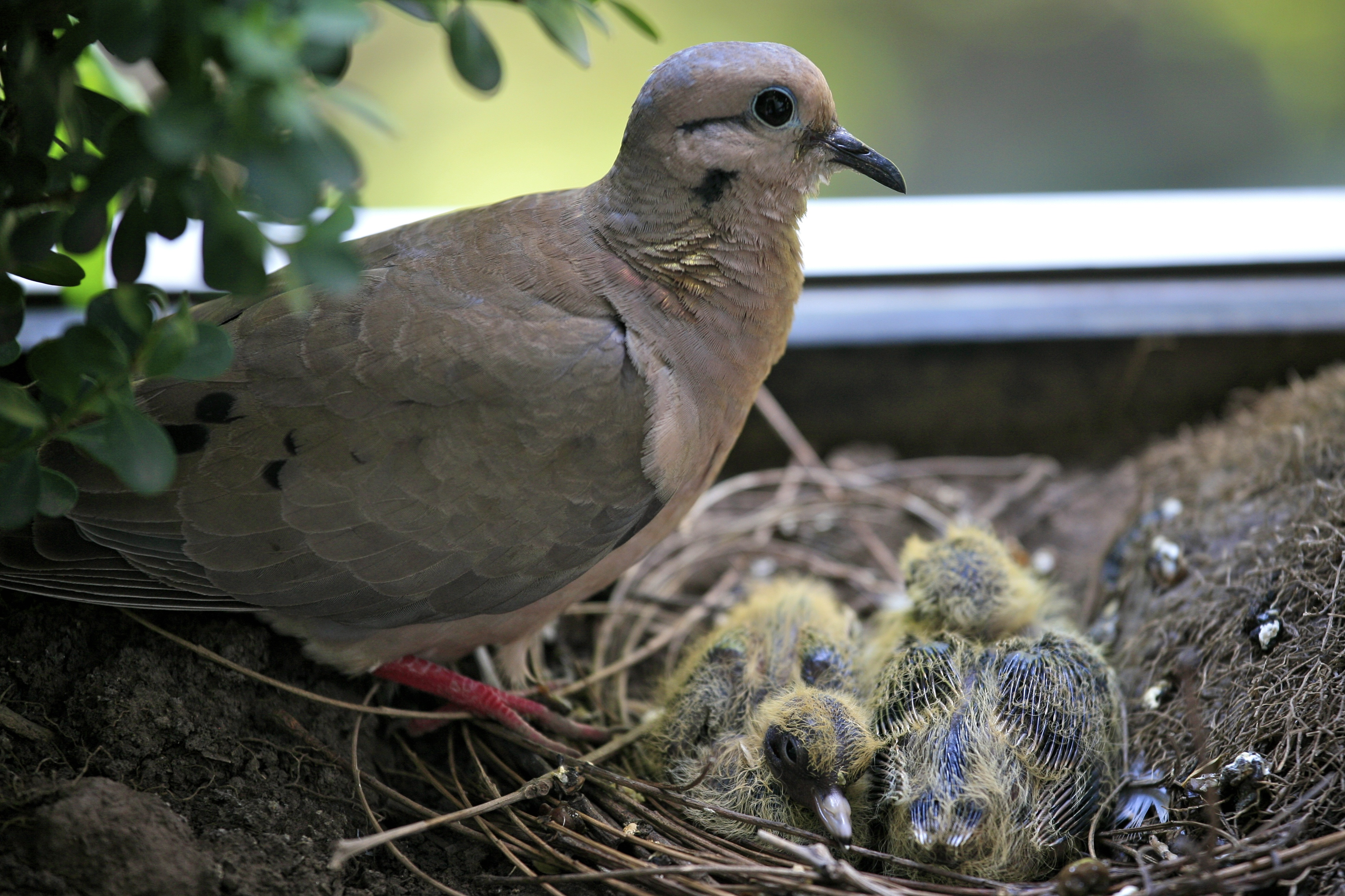
Adult and chicks in Uruguay

The eared dove is common to abundant in savannahs and other open areas, including cultivation, and it readily adapts to human habitation, being seen on wires and telephone posts near towns in Trinidad and Venezuela, in almost all public spaces of large urban areas such as Bogotá, Colombia, and feeding near beach resorts in Tobago.

Eared doves feed mainly on seed and grain taken from the ground. They can be agricultural pests. When in season, agricultural plants such as wheat, rice, sorghum, maize and soybeans may comprise the entirety of the diet. Echinochloa colona, a common savannah grass, and Croton jacobinensis are important seed food for these doves. Their diet may also be augmented by animal foods, such as caterpillars, insect pupae, aphids and snails. This is a gregarious bird when not feeding, and forms flocks especially at migration time or at communal roosts.

Its flight is high, fast, and direct, with the regular beats and an occasional sharp flick of the wings, which are characteristic of pigeons in general. It also has a breeding display with a steep climb and semicircular glide down to its original perch. It builds a small stick nest several meters up in a tree and lays two white eggs. These hatch in 12–14 days with another 9 days to fledging. No fixed breeding season is seen in most of their range, and provided with plentiful food and habitat, birds breed almost continuously.

== Hunting ==
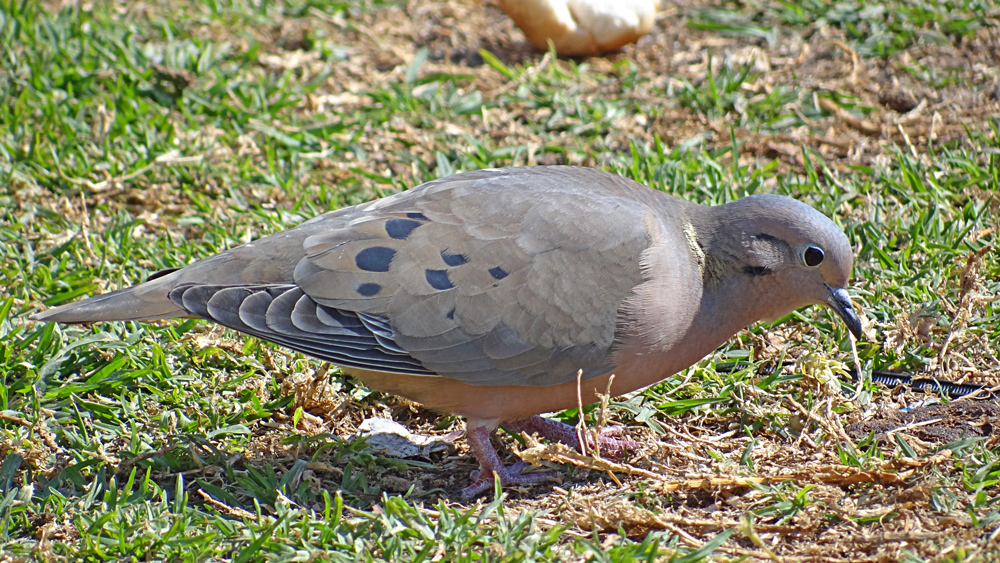
Eared dove in Buenos Aires.

Eared doves provide the last big-bag shooting experience in the world. More than 23 million of these doves are thought to be in the fields around Córdoba in northern Argentina, and recent estimates put the figure in the 32-million range. Not uncommonly, a single gun can shoot 1000 birds in a day.

The scale of this wing-shooting recalls the numbers of passenger pigeons taken by North American gunners in the 1800s. That hunting pressure brought the passenger pigeon to rapid extinction, but the eared dove seems to be more resilient. Indeed, as with the passenger pigeons, eared dove populations in Argentina and Bolivia sometimes "darken the skies". Thus, populations on the sporting estates of Argentina seem to be holding their own, with the birds breeding four times a year and thriving on the vast areas of grain, some grown for their benefit, most of it on commercial farms, which are happy to support the dove shooting. Dozens of luxury lodges specialize in dove hunting, and the season extends all year long.

The eared doves around Córdoba do not migrate, and the enormous flocks are described as flying constantly between their roosting woods and the open fields. In the Córdoba region in Argentina, the eared doves are known as palomas doradas because of the shining feathers sometimes present in their plumage.

Further north, in Bolivia, around de Gran Chaco region, near the immense soy and sorghum plantations around Santa Cruz de la Sierra, the dove shooting is more seasonal, going from May to September, with large flocks arriving from Argentina to raid the grain crops. Locals attest that eared doves, which they call by the Guaraní name of totaky, were quite rare in the region just a few decades ago, a testimony not only to the resilience of the species, but also to the huge impact that the newly created large feeding grounds have on dove populations.
