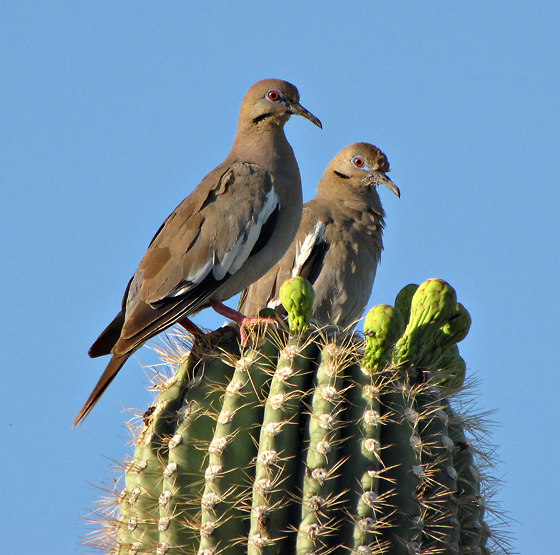
- Perching on a saguaro cactus in Tucson, Arizona

Conservation status
- Least Concern (IUCN 3.1)

Scientific classification
- Kingdom: Animalia
- Phylum: Chordata
- Class: Aves
- Order: Columbiformes
- Family: Columbidae
- Genus: Zenaida
- Species: Z. asiatica

Binomial name
- Zenaida asiatica (Linnaeus, 1758)
- Purple : Year-round; Orange : Breeding; Blue : Nonbreeding

Synonyms
- Columba asiatica Linnaeus, 1758; Columba leucoptera Linnaeus, 1758

= White-winged dove =

Species of bird in North America, Caribbean

The white-winged dove (Zenaida asiatica) is a dove whose native range extends from the Southwestern United States through Mexico, Central America, and the Caribbean. They are large for doves, and can be distinguished from similar doves by the distinctive white edge on their wings. They have a blue eyering and red eyes. The plumage is brownish-gray to gray. Juveniles are duller in color and have brown eyes. The call is likened to the English phrase "who cooks for you". There are three subspecies. It was first described by George Edwards in 1743, and given its binomial name by Linnaeus in 1756. It was moved into the genus Zenaida in 1838.

They inhabit a variety of environments, including desert, scrub, and urban. Their diet consists mostly of grains, but will also include pollen and nectar, especially from the saguaro cactus, which is a vital source of water.

Human expansion has greatly affected the white-winged dove. Before human presence, their range closely mirrored that of their favorite food, the saguaro. The advent of agriculture in North America greatly expanded its range by providing a reliable food source. This has also led some modern populations to be migratory. Historically, they nested in enormous colonies, but most have been lost to human activities and climate change, and most nesting now occurs in isolation. It is hunted for sport, and is the second most shot game bird in the United States. Its population collapsed in the 1960s and 1970s, likely due to the loss of major nesting colonies. The population rebounded, however, and despite continued habitat loss and hunting, it has proved adaptable to human environments. The International Union for Conservation of Nature considers it to be a species of least-concern.

== Taxonomy and systematics ==
- Zenaida
  - - White-winged dove (Z. asiatica)
    - West Peruvian dove (Z. meloda)
  - - Zenaida dove (Z. aurita)
    - - Eared dove (Z. auriculata)
      - - Socorro dove (Z. graysoni)
        - Mourning dove (Z. macroura)

Cladogram showing the relationships of six species of doves in the genus Zenaida. This study did not include the Galápagos dove (Z. galapagoensis).

The white-winged dove is one of 14 dove species found in North America north of Mexico. The Zenaida doves evolved in South America, and then dispersed into Central and North America.

English naturalist George Edwards included an illustration and a description of the white-winged dove in his A Natural History of Uncommon Birds, which was published in 1743. The dove was also briefly described by Irish physician Patrick Browne in 1756 in his The Civil and Natural History of Jamaica. When in 1758, Swedish naturalist Carl Linnaeus updated his Systema Naturae for the tenth edition, he placed the white-winged dove with all the other pigeons in the genus Columba. Linnaeus included a brief description, coined the binomial name Columba asiatica, and cited the earlier authors. The type locality is Jamaica. The dove is now placed in the genus Zenaida that was introduced in 1838 by French naturalist Charles Lucien Bonaparte.

The West Peruvian dove used to be considered part of the white-winged dove species, but was split off as its own species in 1997 – though together they form a superspecies.

The genus Zenaida was named after Zénaïde Laetitia Julie Princesse Bonaparte, the wife of Charles Lucien Bonaparte. The specific epithet asiatica means Asiatic, likely meant in reference to the Indies. The naming is erroneous, however, as a result of a translation mistake. It was intended to refer to Jamaica – in the West Indies, not the Indian subcontinent and its East Indies.

=== Subspecies ===
Three subspecies are recognized:

- Z. a. asiatica (Linnaeus, 1758) – The nominate subspecies, its breeding range is in the southern US to Nicaragua and the West Indies.
- Z. a. australis (Peters, 1913) – The breeding range is in western Costa Rica and western Panama. It is smaller than the nominate subspecies, with browner back and wings, and a redder-colored chest. It includes the former subspecies Z. a. panamensis. Australis means "southern" in Latin.
- Z. a. mearnsi (Ridgway, 1915) – The breeding range encompasses the southwestern US and western Mexico, including Baja California. It is larger, paler, and grayer than the nominate subspecies. This subspecies includes the former subspecies Z. a. clara, Z. a. grandis, Z. a. insularis, and Z. a. palustris. It is named after Lt. Col. Edgar Alexander Mearns, an American ornithologist, army surgeon, and bird collector throughout the Americas and Africa.

Though they are highly variable, some general trends in characteristics may be made based on geography. Eastern birds tend to be paler and grayer, and southern birds tend to be browner and darker. Birds in central Mexico and Texas are the largest, whereas birds in southern Mexico, lower Central America, and the Yucatán Peninsula are the smallest.

== Description ==
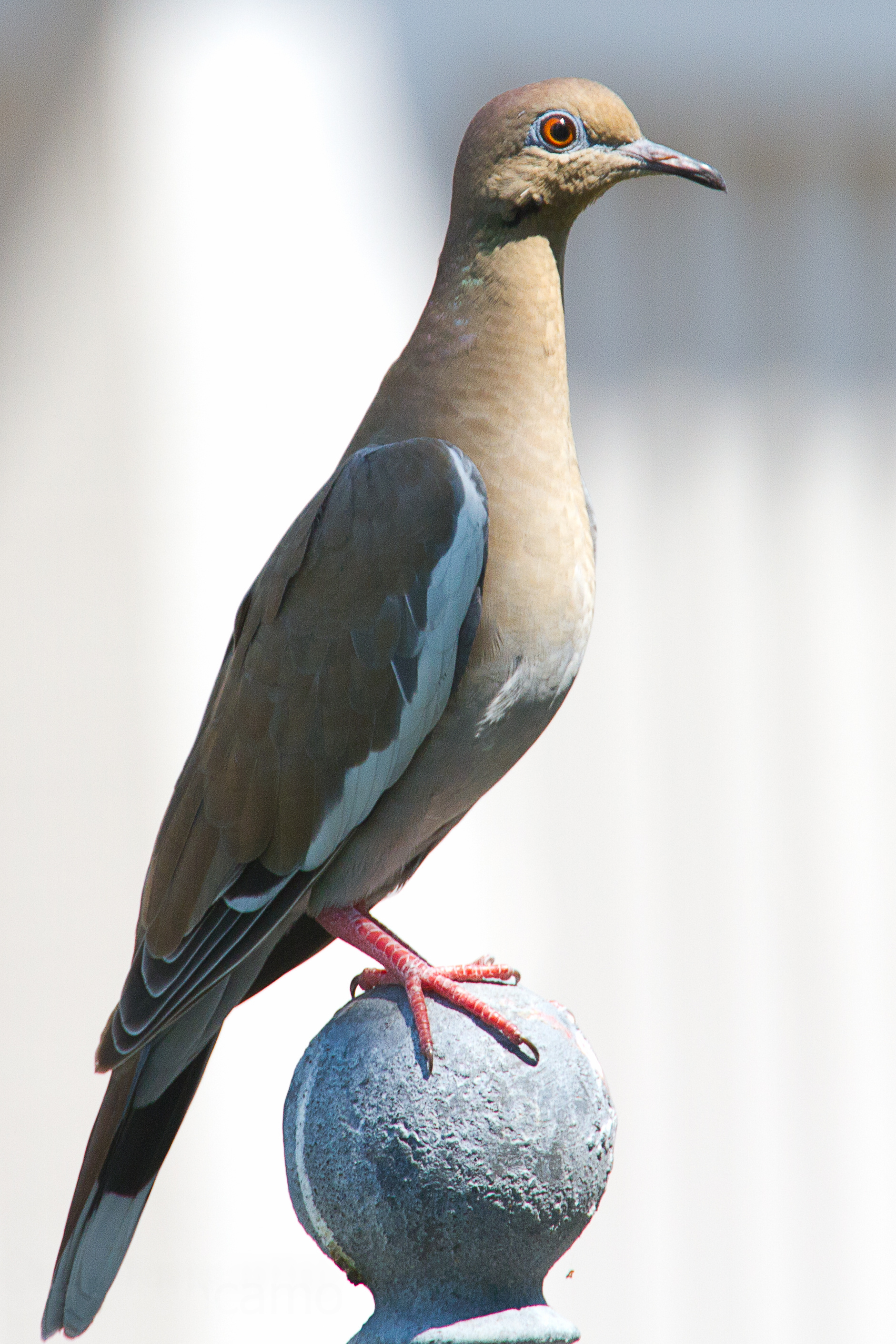
In Texas

White-winged doves are a plump, medium-sized bird (large for a dove), at 29 cm (11 in) from tip to tail, and a weight of 150 g (5.3 oz). Wingspan ranges from 18.9 to 22.8 in (48–58 cm). They are brownish-gray above and gray below, with a bold white wing patch that appears as a brilliant white crescent in flight, and is also visible at rest. Adults have a ring of blue, featherless skin around each eye and a long, dark mark on the lower face. They have a blue eye ring, and their legs and feet are brighter pink/red. Their eyes are bright crimson, except for juveniles, who have brown eyes. Juveniles are duller and grayer than adults and lack iridescence. Juvenile plumage is usually found between March and October.

Differentiating between sexes is difficult, and usually requires examination of the cloaca. Males do have a more iridescent purple color to the crown, neck, and nape, as well as a more distinctive ear spot, though the differences are slight. Males are usually heavier on average, but differences in daily weight due to feeding make this an inaccurate field tool. Thus, most observers cannot accurately differentiate between sexes based on external characteristics alone.

The identifying hallmark is its namesake white-edged wing, which similar species lack. It appears similar to the mourning dove, with which it may be easily confused. Compared to the mourning dove, it is larger and heavier. It has a short, rounded tail, whereas the mourning dove has a long, tapered, triangular tail. The mourning dove has several black spots on the wing; the white-winged dove does not. Other similar species include the white-tipped dove, but the lack of white wing edging is distinctive. The same goes for the invasive Eurasian collared dove, which is further differentiated by grayish overall color and black neck band.

Their molt is similar to that of the mourning dove. Molting runs from June through November and occurs in the summer breeding grounds unless interrupted by migration.

=== Vocalizations ===
David Sibley describes the call as a hhhHEPEP pou poooo, likening it to the English phrase "who cooks for you". They also make a pep pair pooa paair pooa paair pooa call, with the last two words being repeated at length. Males sit on dedicated perches to give their call, which is referred to as a "coo". Calling is most frequent during the breeding season, and peaks in May and June. Most calls are given just before dawn or in the late afternoon. Females give a slightly softer and more slurred call than males. The purpose of calling is uncertain, but it is mainly used for courtship and to defend territory. A shortened version of their song may be used between mates to maintain pair bonds. Nestlings can make noises starting at two days old; by five days old, they can whistle a sur-ee call to beg for food. Additionally, individuals of both sexes will use a muted trumpeting errUah call to announce and contest presence on popular preening branches and bird feeders.

Nonvocal sounds include a wing whistle at take-off, which is similar to that of the mourning dove, albeit quieter. Their wing beats are heavy, sounding similar to other pigeons. When leaving cooing perches, males make an exaggerated and noisy flapping of the wings.

== Distribution and habitat ==
Some populations of white-winged doves are migratory, wintering in Mexico, Central America, and the Caribbean. They are year-round inhabitants in Texas. San Antonio, Texas, had a year-round population of over a million doves in 2001. The white-winged dove inhabits scrub, woodlands, desert, urban, and cultivated areas. They are found increasingly farther north, now being visitors to most of the United States, and small parts of southern Canada.

In recent years with increasing urbanization and backyard feeding, it has expanded throughout Texas, into Oklahoma, Louisiana, and coastal Mississippi. It has also been introduced to Florida. The white-winged dove is expanding outside its historic range into Kansas, Arkansas, Oklahoma, and northern New Mexico. The species is occasionally observed as a vagrant north of its typical range, and birds are being increasingly reported as far north as Canada and Alaska.

Within Arizona, populations are effectively divided between agricultural and desert groups. It shares its habitat with that of the mourning dove, but the white winged dove will fly higher.

They generally nest at low densities in the desert, but are found in high concentrations near riparian areas. Nesting in riparian zones is referred to as colonial, as opposed to noncolonial behavior in harsher environments. Such colonies are quite variable, but may be very large. Colony size varies from 5 hectares (0.019 mi^{2}) to well over a 1,000 hectares (3.9 mi^{2}). Outside of colonies, nests have a density of less than 10 per hectare, but within colonies, 500–1,000 nests are found per hectare.

Before the advent of widespread agriculture, they may not have been widely present in what is now the United States, as evidenced by a lack of fossil remains and absence from the journals of early European explorers. Their presence in California is likely recent, as a result of the manmade filling of the Salton Sea at the turn of the 20th century. The historical range of the dove closely mirrors that of the saguaro cactus, on which it relies heavily for nectar and fruit where it is found. Modern agriculture has greatly expanded its range by providing a reliable source of forage. The urban heat island effect may also enable them to live further north than they otherwise could.

White-winged doves typically migrate into Arizona beginning in March. In California, birds arrive in April and depart by August. Texas migrations run from April through June, peaking in May, and departures run from September to October. Migratory groups may include as many as 4,000 individuals, though typically less than 50. A combination of weather, food availability, and hunting pressure can affect the timing of migration. As populations expand in Texas they are becoming less migratory; about 1/3 of birds now overwinter in Texas. Migrations are tracked via traditional banding methods, but the isotope composition of hydrogen and carbon in the feathers can also be used. A 2015 study showed that by tracking the amount of various isotopes, researchers could accurately identify a white-winged dove's migration origin. They could also identify if it had been eating from saguaros because of the unique carbon signature that cactus photosynthesis produces.

== Behavior and ecology ==
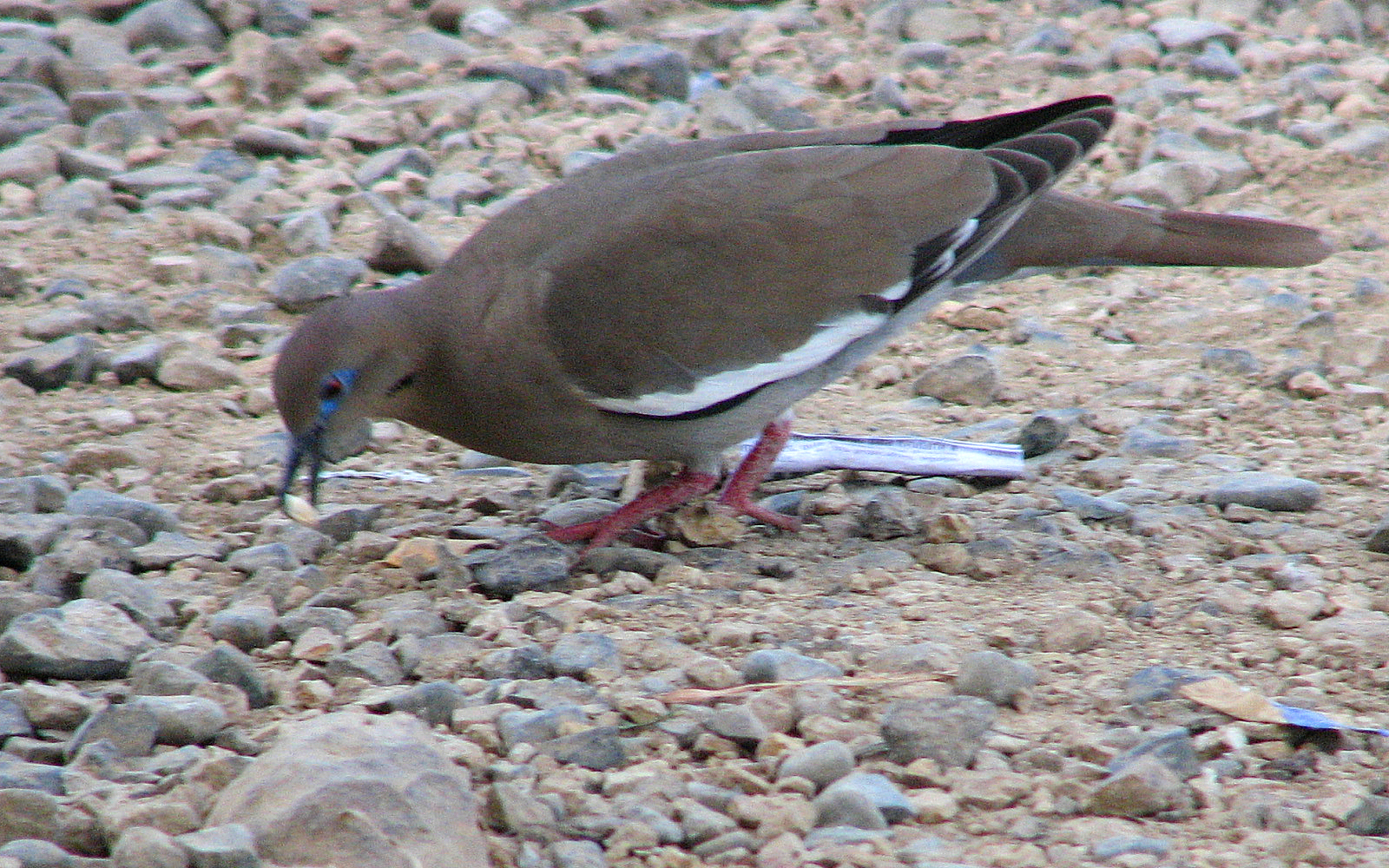
Eating large seed in San José, Costa Rica

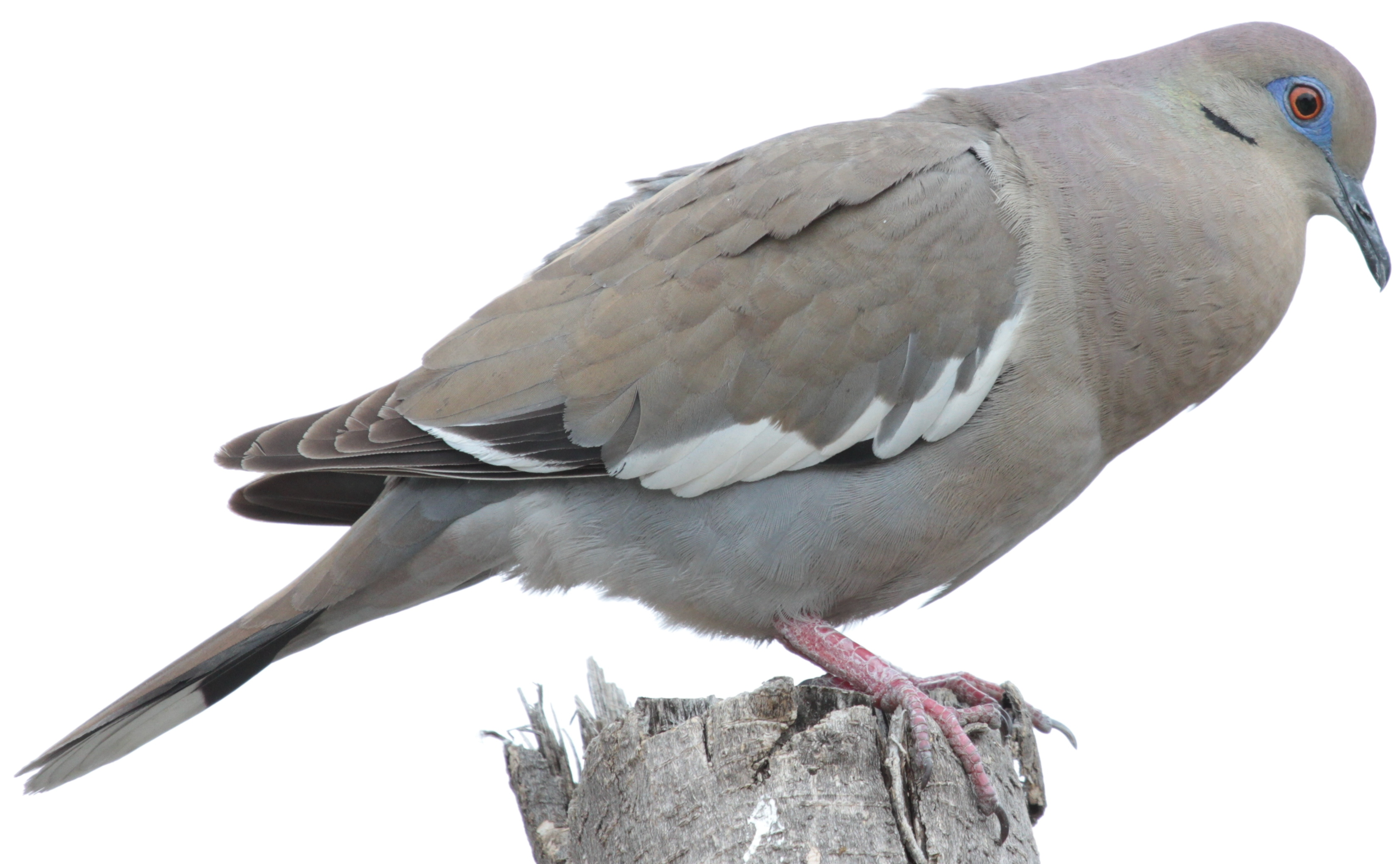
Cooing, Monterrey Mexico

Normally, up to 4000 birds are seen migrating, but in Texas, a flock of up to a million birds was recorded. Z. asiatica may fly 25 or more miles to find water, though they can be sustained solely by the water in saguaro cactus fruit.

=== Breeding and nesting ===
To impress females, males circle them with tail spread and wings raised, and also fan or flap their tails, or engage in cooing and preening. Males may aggressively defend territory from other males, sparring with wing slaps. Males and females work together in raising the young. The white-winged dove builds a flimsy stick nest in a tree of any kind and lays two cream-colored to white, unmarked eggs. One chick often hatches earlier and stronger, so it will demand the most food from the parents. A dove may nest as soon as 2–3 months after leaving the nest, making use of the summer heat. The dove nests as long as food and enough warmth are available to keep the fledglings warm. In Texas, they nest well into late August. Families and nestmates often stay together for life, perching and foraging together. They return to the same nesting site year after year, sometimes rebuilding a nest in the exact location it was the year before.

They have better nesting success when in mesquite or tamarix trees. It is rare for them to build nests on man-made structures. One recorded instance includes a nest built atop a light pole in Corpus Christi, TX. Breeding occurs in two peaks in the summer, although the timing of their breeding varies by year. The peak breeding times for these desert doves occur from May to June to July to August. Breeding in urban areas also occurs in two peaks, but may be somewhat offset in timing compared to the desert birds. Eggs are relatively small compared to body weight, as white-winged doves invest more energy in feeding altricial young instead of laying large eggs that would enable precocial young. Males attend to the nest for the majority of the day, except for foraging breaks during the midmorning and late afternoon while the female watches the nest. At night, females watch the nest, and the male roosts nearby. Juvenile feathers begin to replace the natal down by seven days old. The pre-juvenile molt is complete around 30 days old. By early September, most of the adult birds have already begun the migration south. The young leave soon after.

Instances of hybridization with the related mourning dove are thought to be rare. Nonetheless, evidence of interspecific gene flow has been found in both species. It is possible that hybridization could become more frequent as the expanding range of the white-winged dove increasingly overlaps with that of the mourning dove.

=== Feeding ===
White-winged doves are granivorous, feeding on a variety of seeds, grains, and fruits. Western white-winged doves (Z. a. mearnsii) migrate into the Sonoran Desert to breed during the hottest time of the year because they feed on pollen and nectar, and later on the fruits and seeds of the saguaro. They also visit feeders, eating the food dropped on the ground. Unlike mourning doves, they eat corn and wheat right off the head. This gregarious species can be an agricultural pest, descending on grain crops in large flocks.

White-winged doves have been found to practice collaborative feeding. Observations in Texas revealed that some birds were shaking seeds from a Chinese tallow tree for the benefit of those on the ground. Doves may represent a vector to spread the invasive Chinese tallow tree by defecating undigested seeds.

Agricultural fields, especially cereal grains, are a major source of forage, but they provide less protein content, which limits productivity. Having access to significant amounts of native seed is important to ensure that nestlings fledge and are healthy. This is made even more critical because white-winged doves do not supplement their diet with insects while raising young, unlike many other grain-eating birds.

=== Survival ===
White-winged doves are subjected to the usual arid-land predators, including foxes, bobcats, snakes, and coyotes. Aerial predators include owls and hawks. Domestic cats and dogs also take doves.

The oldest recorded wild individual lived to 21 years and 9 months, though the typical lifespan is closer to 10 or 15 years. In captivity, they have been recorded to live up to 25 years.

== In culture ==
White-winged doves are popular as game birds for hunting. They are the only North American game species that is also a migratory pollinator. Hunting of the species peaked in the late 1960s, with an annual take around 740,000 birds in Arizona. That has since fallen; in 2008, just under 80,000 birds were taken in Arizona. The national take is larger, 1.6 million were hunted in 2011, with Texas taking 1.3 million. Most of the hunted birds are juveniles, averaging about 63% of the catch. Large numbers of birds were taken before the 1970s, when falling populations led to a tightening of hunting laws. In the 1960s, hunters could legally take up to 25 birds per day in Arizona over a three-week season. The Arizona dove season has since been restricted to two weeks and six birds per day, with shooting only allowed for half of each day. The bag limit in Texas is four birds per day, but the Texas catch remains the largest of any state.

They are also popular among birders and photographers. People in many areas provide feeding stations and water in backyards to attract them for observation.

The Stevie Nicks song "Edge of Seventeen" features a white-winged dove.

== Status ==
The United States Fish and Wildlife Service has tracked the population of these doves for decades. The United States population peaked in 1968, but fell precipitously in the 1970s. The decline is likely due to loss of large nesting colonies in the 1960s and 1970s from habitat destruction, shifts in agricultural trends, and over-hunting. The population has continued to decline despite tougher hunting laws. Its population and range in Arizona have sharply contracted, though its range continues to expand in Texas. Though it is the second-most shot-hunted bird in the United States, it remains poorly studied, especially in California and Florida, as well as in Mexico.

Lead poisoning, especially in hunting areas, poses a significant risk to white-winged dove health. A 2010 Texas study found that 66% of doves had elevated lead levels. The study noted that birds with lethal concentrations of lead were not found because accidental ingestion of lead shot can kill birds in just two days, and that they are incapacitated before that point, meaning that such birds died before they could be collected by researchers.

Climate change is expected to expand their range to the north, but will also threaten populations with increased drought and fire, which destroy habitat, and spring heatwaves, which can kill young in the nest.

Colonial nesting sites in Mexico have seen significant losses. The main causes were brush clearing to make way for agricultural or urban development (leading to habitat loss), extreme weather such as droughts and hurricanes, and over-hunting. The population in Mexico followed the trend of the American population. In the 1970s, only a million birds were in northeastern Mexico, compared to a rebound of 16 million in the 1980s, and five million in 2007. Habitat fragmentation is of great concern to the species, especially due to the preference for returning to the same large colonies year after year. Due to continued pressures, large nesting colonies are now mainly gone and are not expected to return. Despite this, the white-winged dove has proved adaptable to human disturbance, and is regarded as a species of least concern by the International Union for Conservation of Nature.

== Gallery ==
Video of a white-winged dove in Big Bend National Park, Texas, US

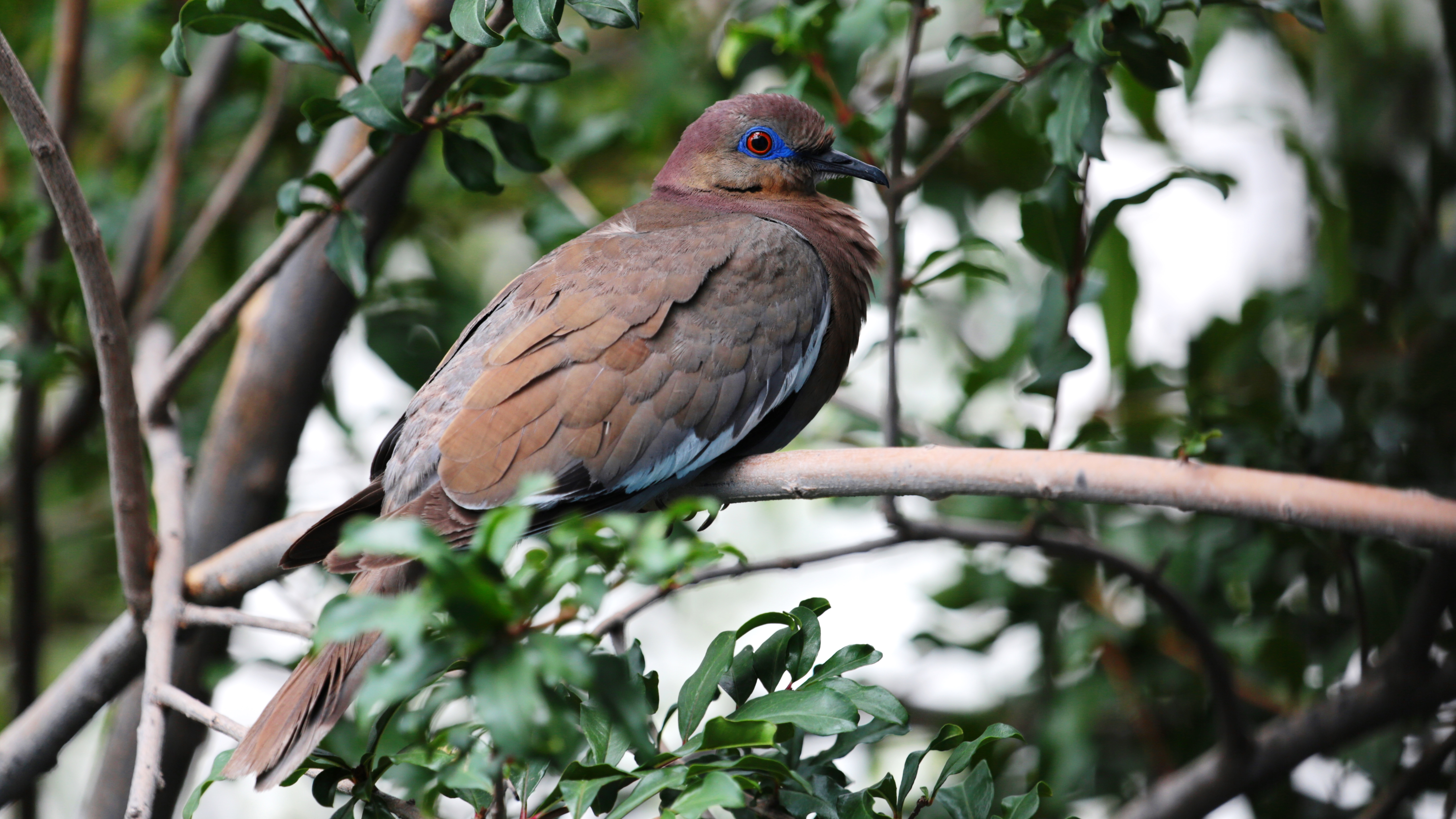
Showing off a slightly more purplish color

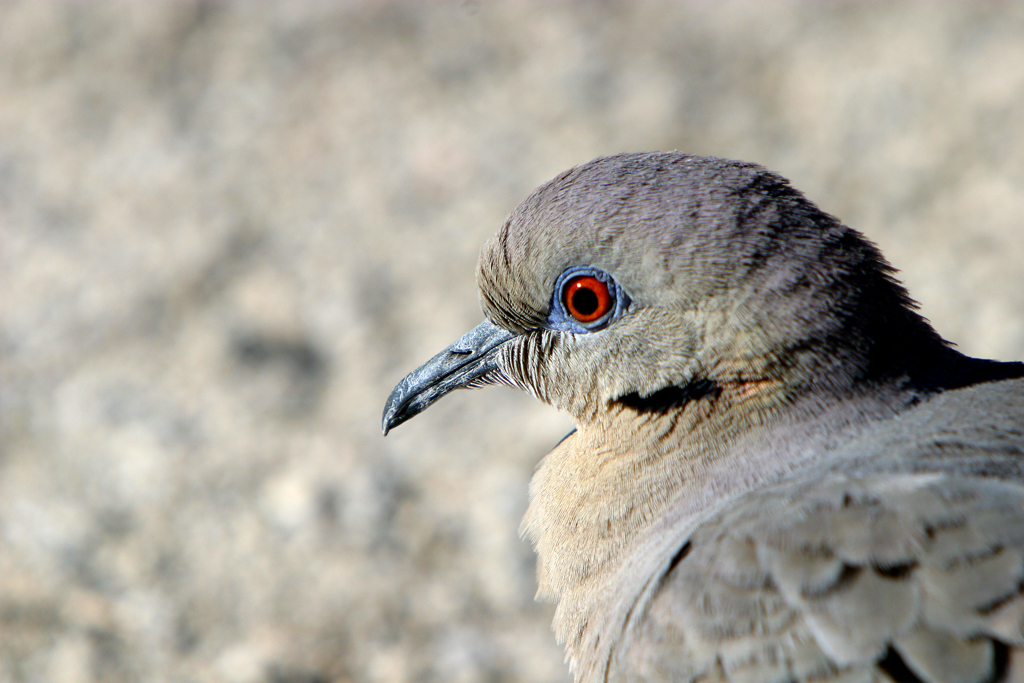
Closeup showing the distinctive red eye and blue eye ring

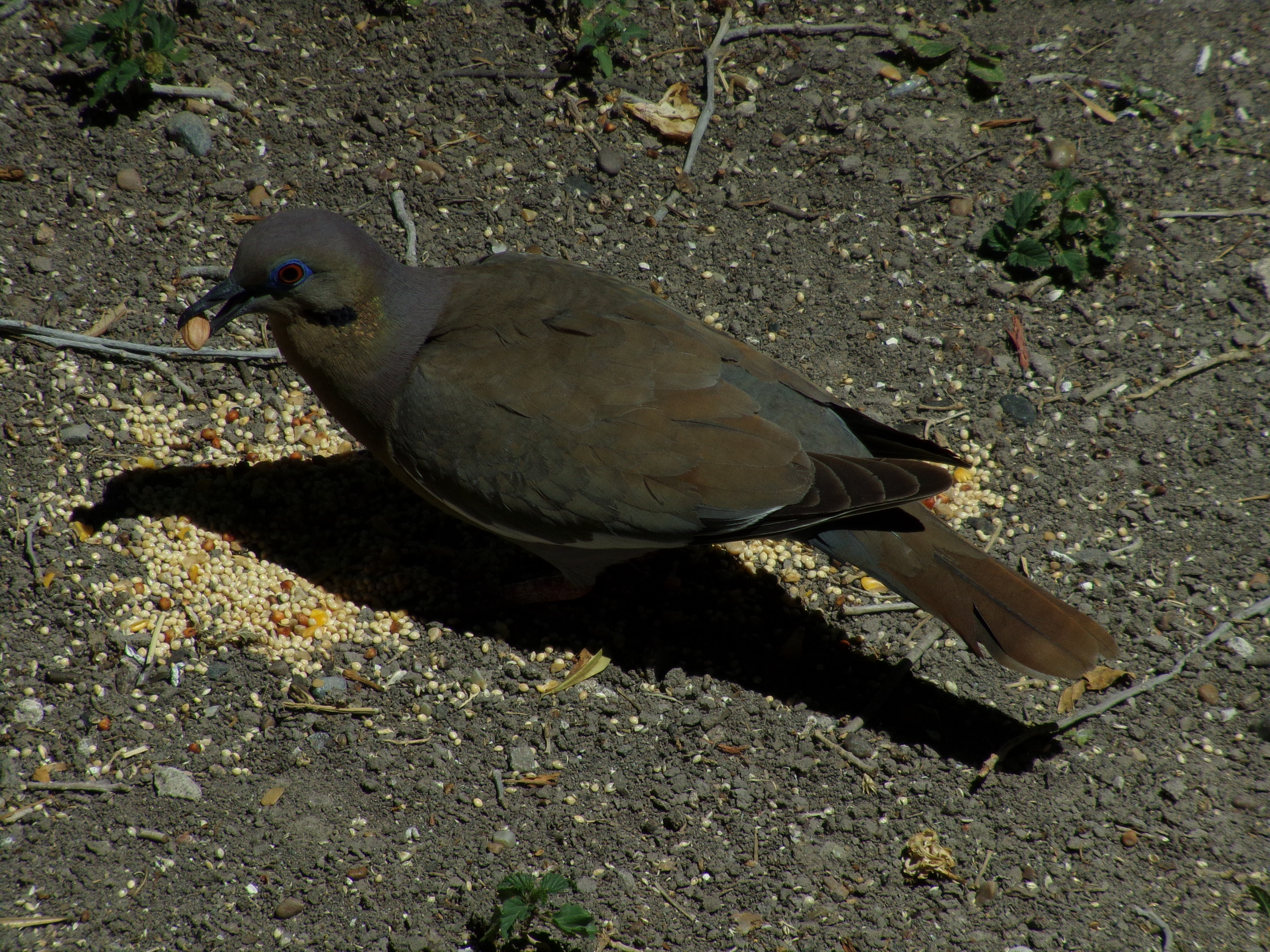

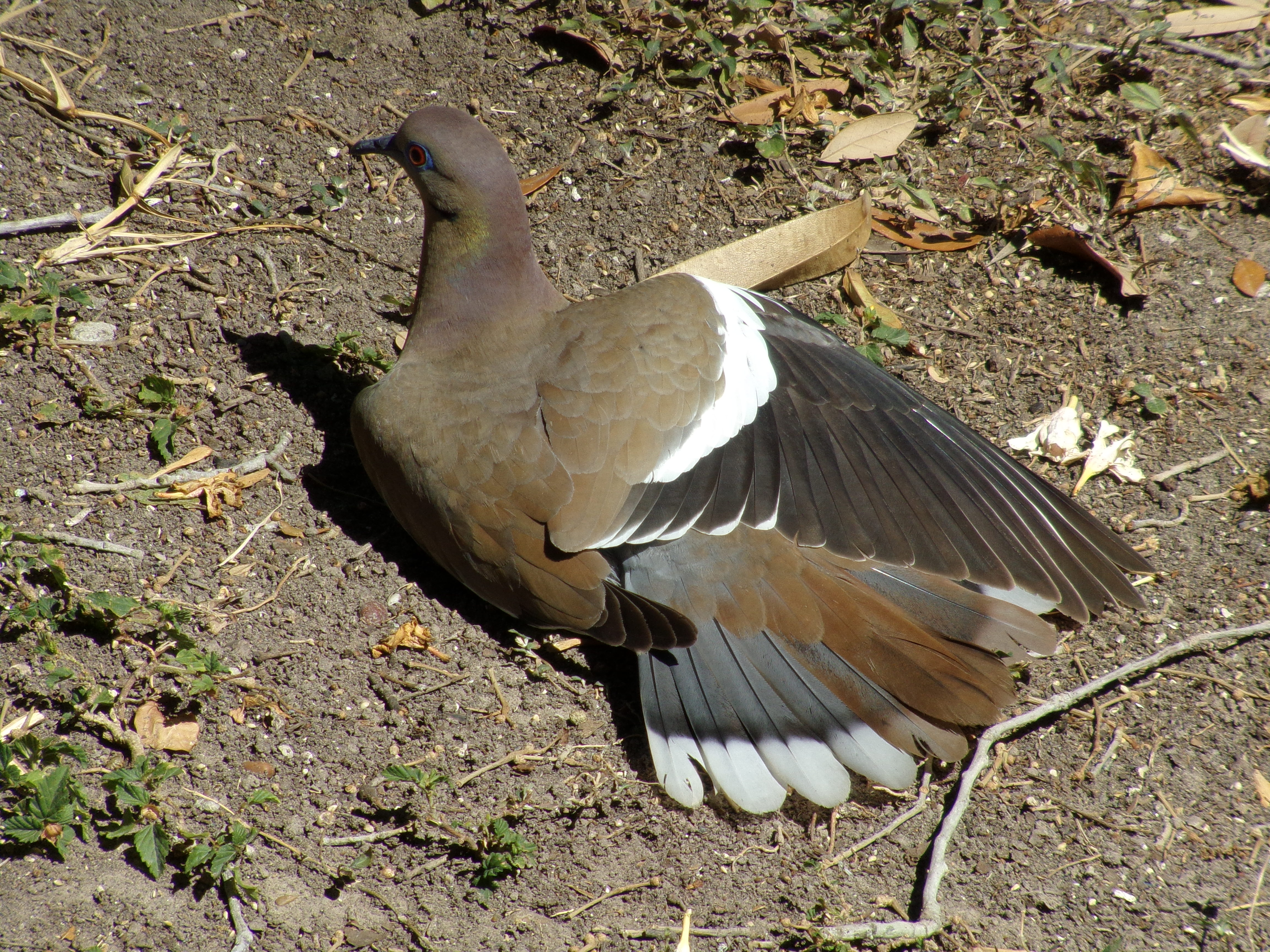
The white wing patch that edges the wings at rest becomes a stripe when the wing is extended

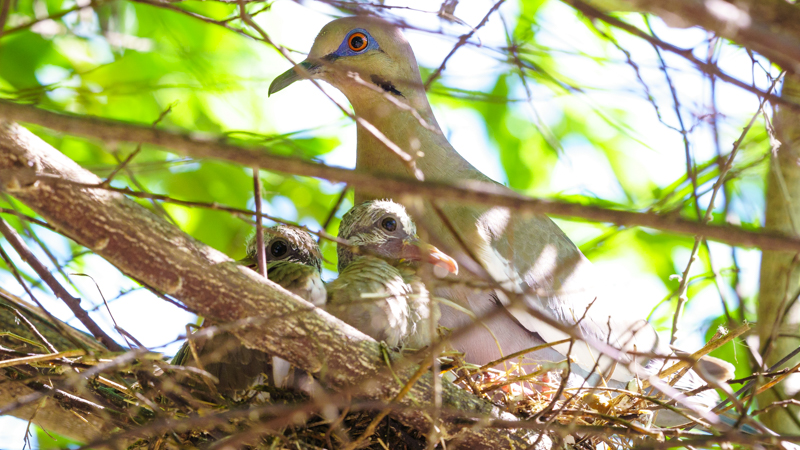
With squabs in Puerto Rico

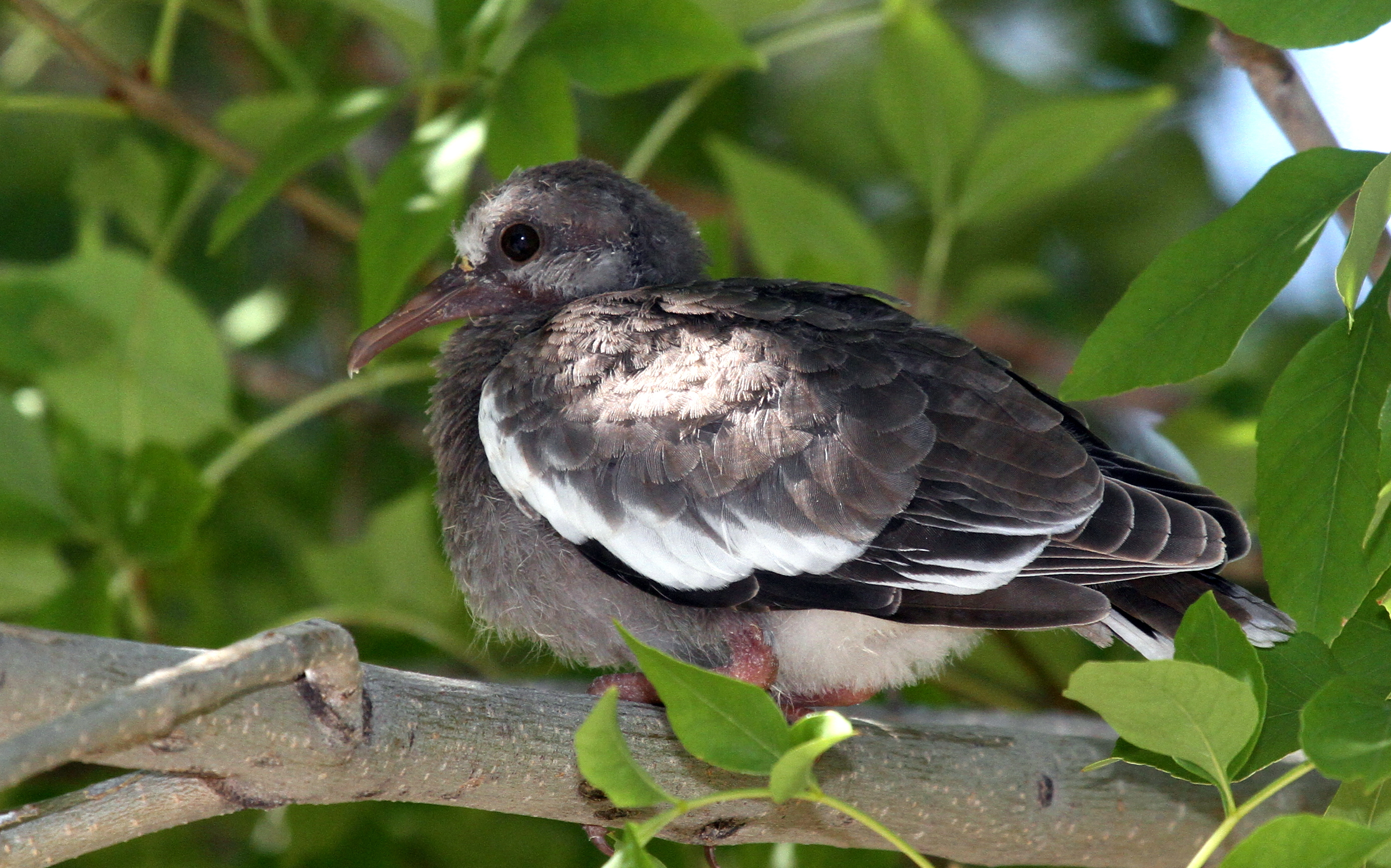
Juvenile

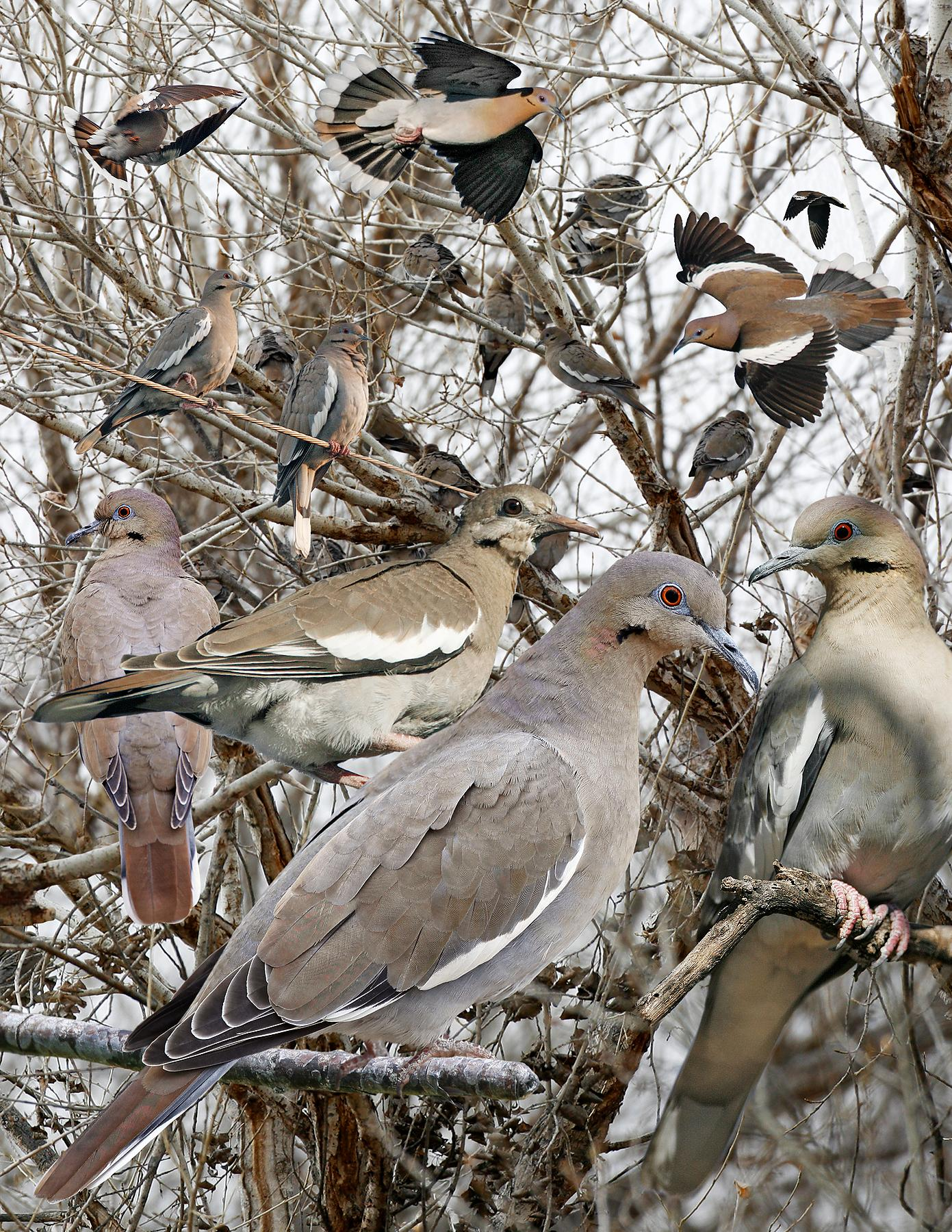
Composite identification image

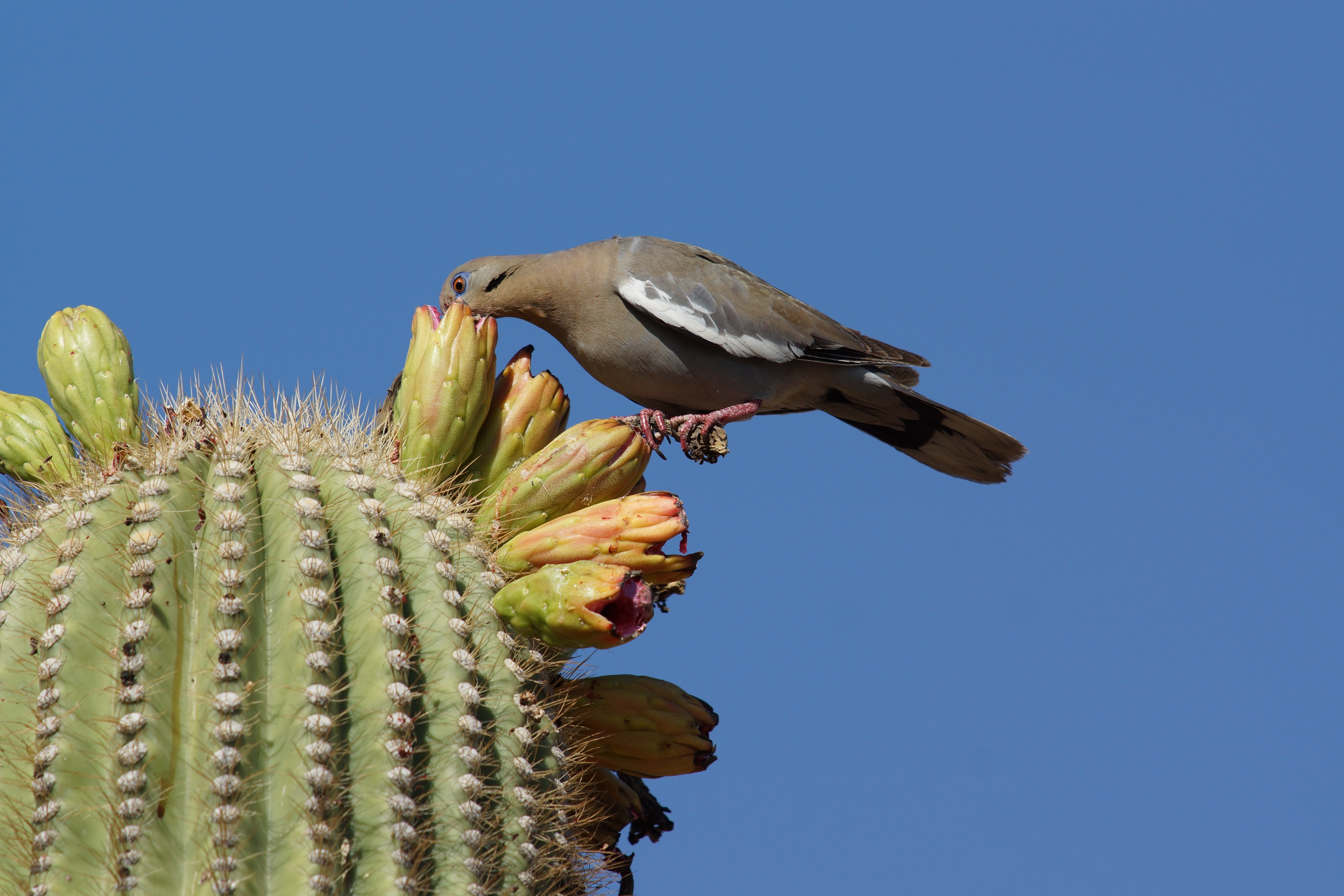
Eating from its favorite food, a saguaro fruit
