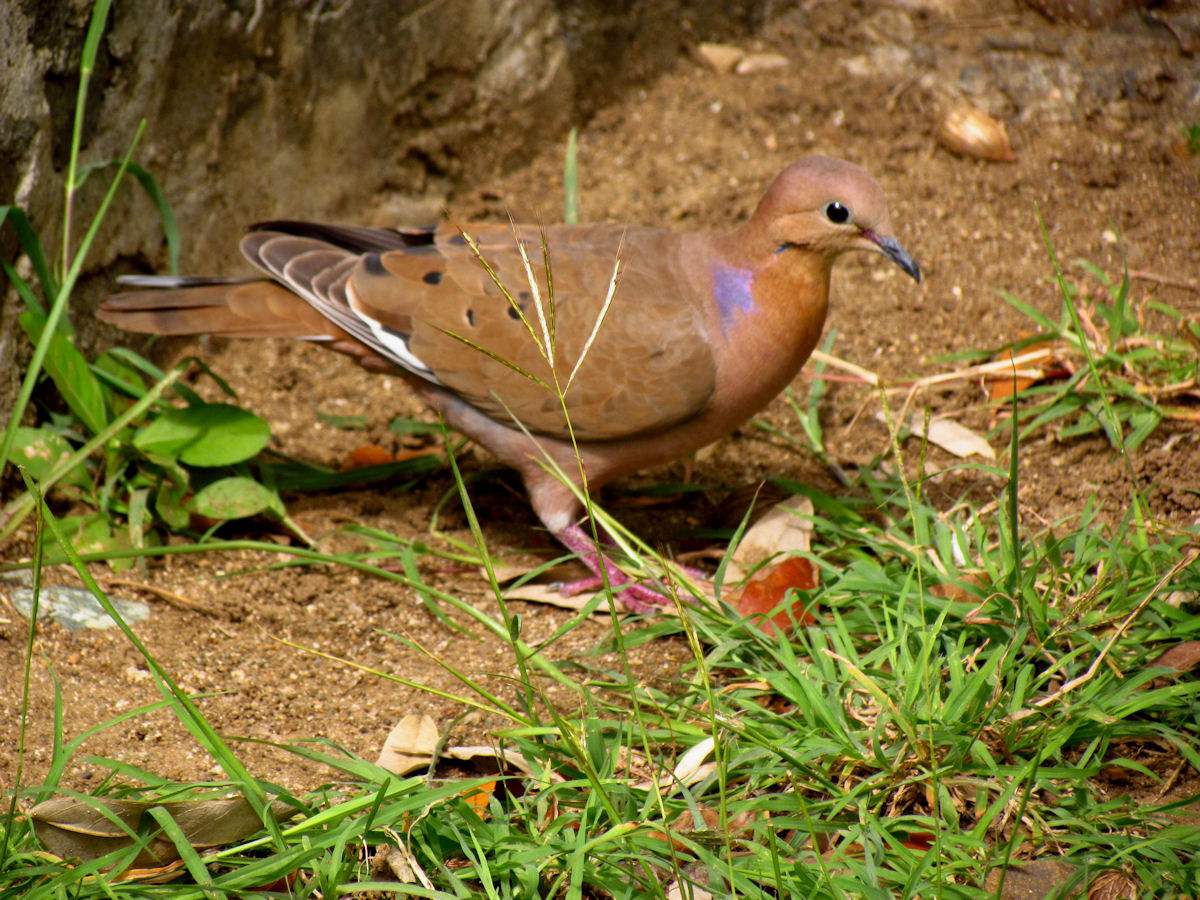
- Male, St. Thomas, USVI

Conservation status
- Least Concern (IUCN 3.1) I

Scientific classification
- Kingdom: Animalia
- Phylum: Chordata
- Class: Aves
- Order: Columbiformes
- Family: Columbidae
- Genus: Zenaida
- Species: Z. aurita

Binomial name
- Zenaida aurita (Temminck, 1809)

= Zenaida dove =

Species of bird

The Zenaida dove (Zenaida aurita) is the type species of the genus Zenaida, member of the bird family Columbidae, which includes doves and pigeons. Its range is found throughout the Caribbean islands, and along the northern coast of the Yucatan Peninsula. It is the national bird of Anguilla.

== Taxonomy ==
The Zenaida dove was first described in 1809 by Dutch zoologist Coenraad Jacob Temminck, who originally classified it as Columba aurita in the ornithological documentation of Les Pigeons, and later moved as the Zenaida amabilis to its current genus of Zenaida in 1838, where it is classified as being closely related to species such as the mourning dove and the eared dove.

The genus Zenaida comes from Zénaïde Bonaparte, wife of French naturalist Charles Lucien Bonaparte, who first introduced the genus itself in 1838. The species epithet, aurita, means "eared" or "having ears" in Latin, referencing the black auricular patches located close to their eyes, where their ears would be located.

- Zenaida
  - - White-winged dove (Z. asiatica)
    - West Peruvian dove (Z. meloda)
  - - Zenaida dove (Z. aurita)
    - - Eared dove (Z. auriculata)
      - - Socorro dove (Z. graysoni)
        - Mourning dove (Z. macroura)

Cladogram showing the relationships of six species of doves in the genus Zenaida. This study did not include the Galápagos dove (Z. galapagoensis).

=== Subspecies ===
Documented and verified subspecies include:

- Z. a. aurita (Temminck, 1809) – Its breeding range stretches throughout the Lesser Antilles: found across both the Leeward and Winward Islands, where it is locally known as turtle dove, but not the Leeward Antilles (such as the ABC Islands).
- Z. a. zenaida (Bonaparte, 1825) – Formerly documented as a separate species as the Zenaida amabilis and now classified as the nominate subspecies, it breeds throughout the Greater Antilles, including Cuba, Jamaica, the Cayman Islands, Hispaniola and Puerto Rico, and the Lucayan Archipelago, including the Bahamas and the Turks and Caicos Islands.
- Z. a. salvadorii (Ridgway, 1916) – It breeds along the northern coast and mangrove forests of the Yucatan Peninsula and Cozumel in Mexico, where it is locally known as huilota caribeña.

== Description ==
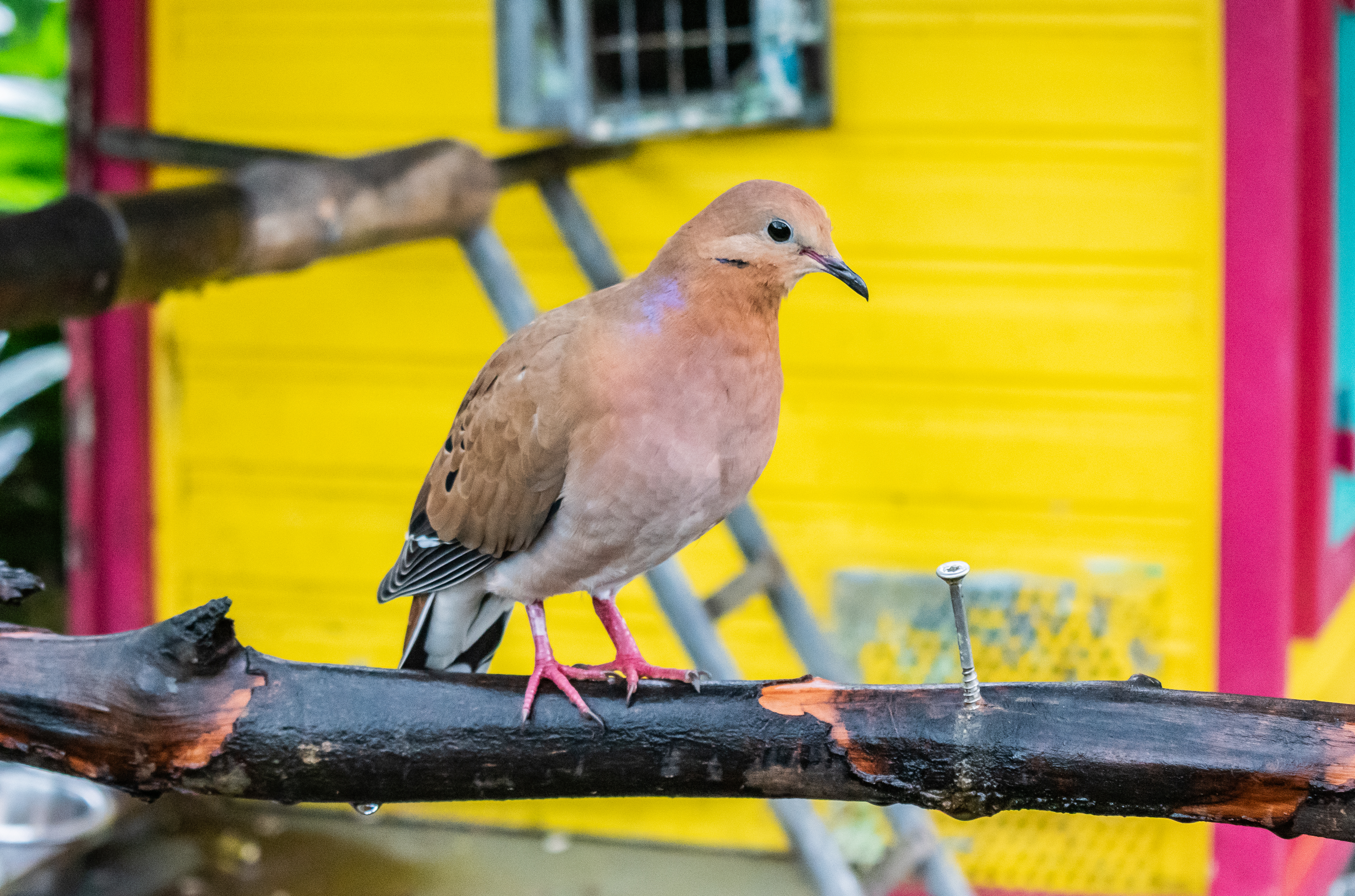
Z. a. aurita in the Jardin Botanique de Deshaises of Guadeloupe.

The Zenaida dove is approximately 28–30 cm (11–12 in) in length. It looks very similar to the mourning dove, but is smaller in size, has a shorter, more rounded tail, and is a bit more darkly colored. It is also distinguished from the mourning dove by showing white on the trailing edge of its wings while in flight. The mourning dove does not have the white trailing edge.

== Distribution and habitat ==
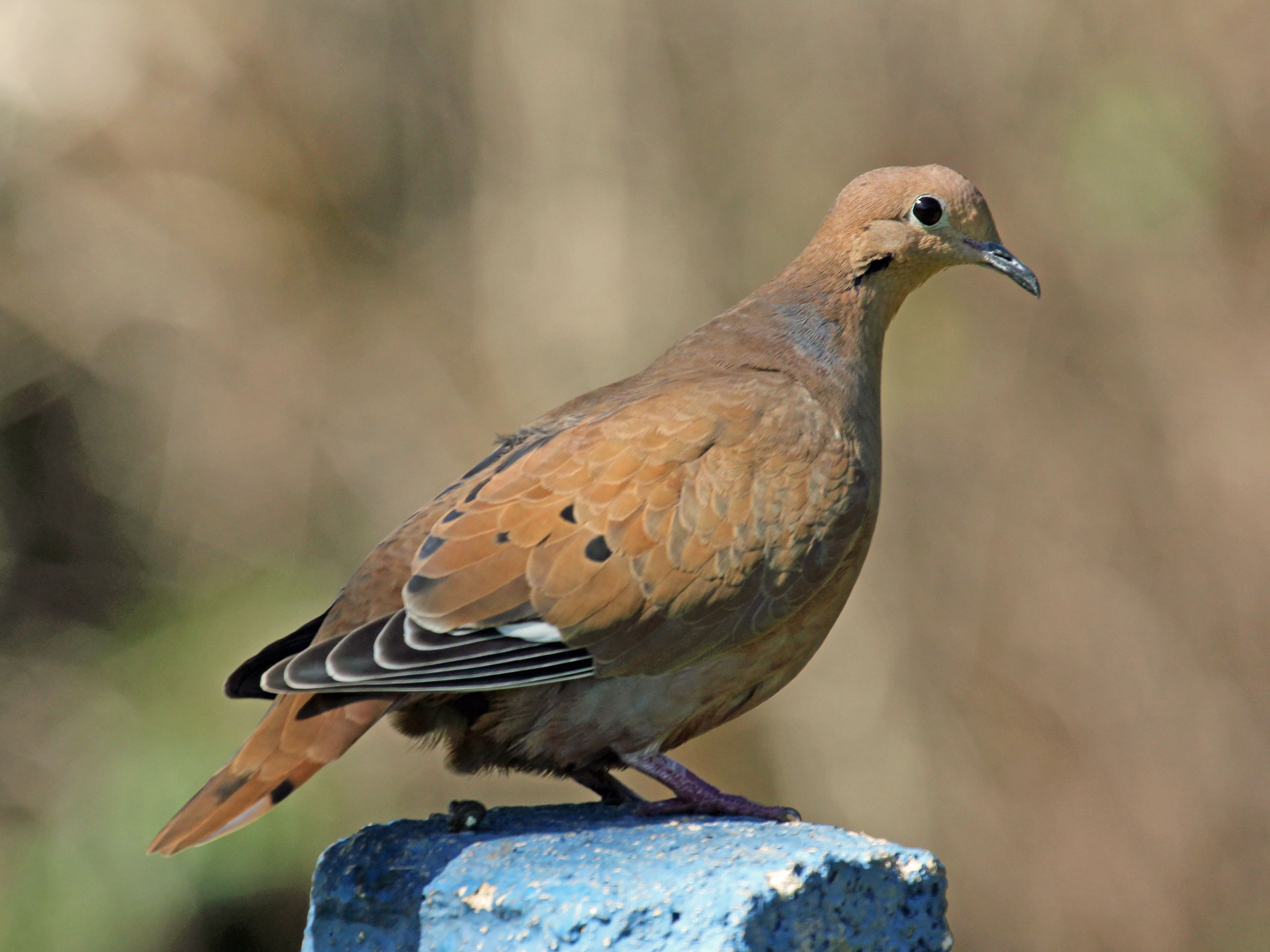
Z. a. zenaida in Jamaica.

The Z. a. aurita and zenaida subspecies of the dove breed throughout the Caribbean islands, while the Z. a. salvadorii subspecies breeds along the tip of the Yucatán Peninsula. It was reported by John James Audubon to breed in the Florida Keys, but there are only three verifiable records from Florida.

The bird is resident and abundant over much of its range. It is found in a variety of open and semi-open habitats, preferring lowlands, coastal plains and bushy scrublands. In Jamaica, however, they can be found in much higher elevations (up to 1,500 meters above sea level) such as in the Blue Mountains. Both Z. a. aurita and Z. a. zenaida can also be commonly found in and near beaches, and have been successful in adapting to living conditions in highly urbanized and suburbanized areas such as city parks, botanical gardens, hotel and resort grounds, town edges, cultivated orchards and other agricultural lands.

The Z. a. salvadorii subspecies has particularly adapted to a diverse range of coastal and aquatic ecosystems, notably mangrove forests such as the Petenes mangroves, and the numerous keys and atolls found along the northern and northeastern coast of the Yucatan Peninsula.

== Behavior and ecology ==
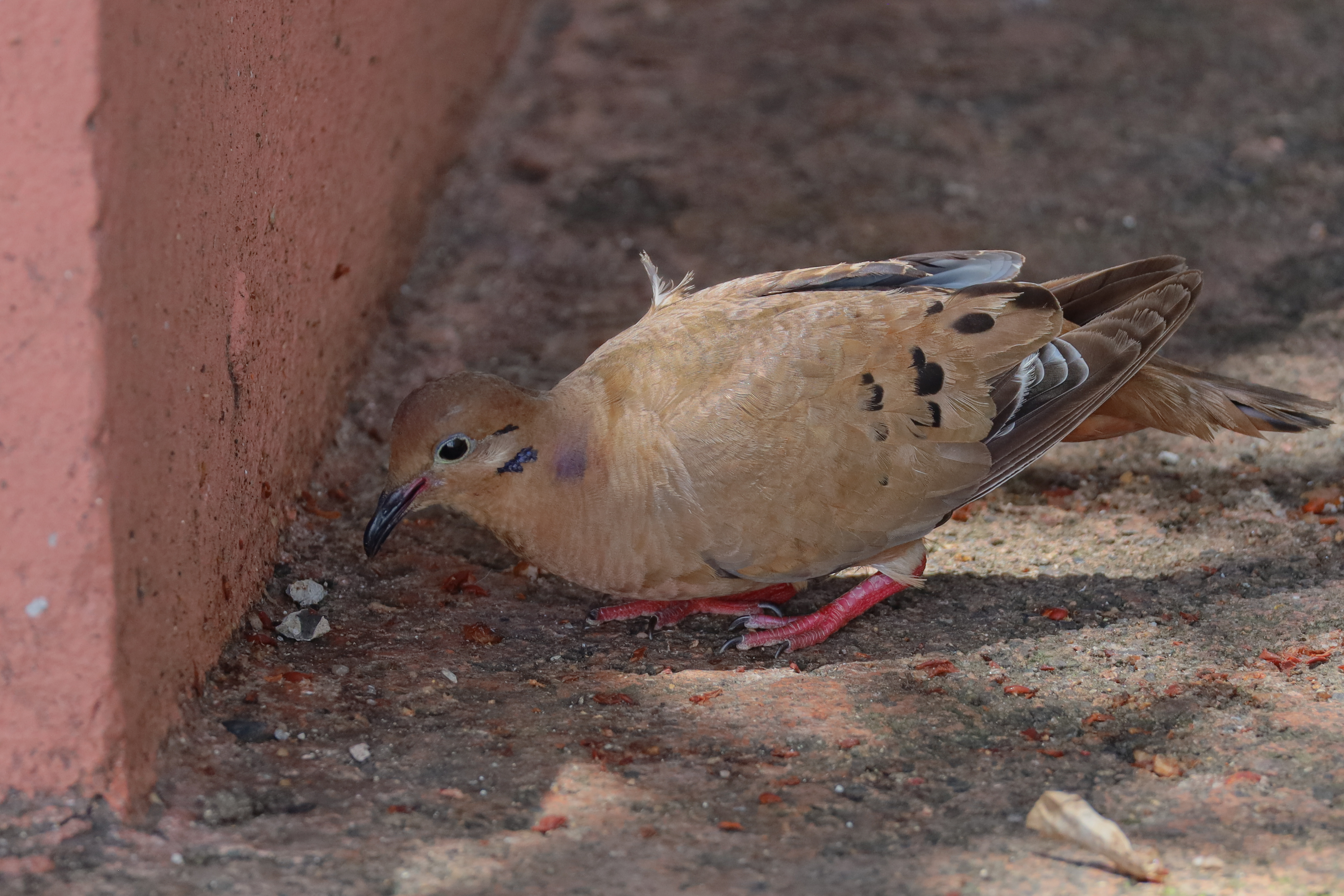
Z. a. zenaida feeding in Old San Juan.

Its mournful cooOOoo-coo-coo-coo call is similar to the call of a mourning dove, but faster in pace.

=== Breeding and nesting ===
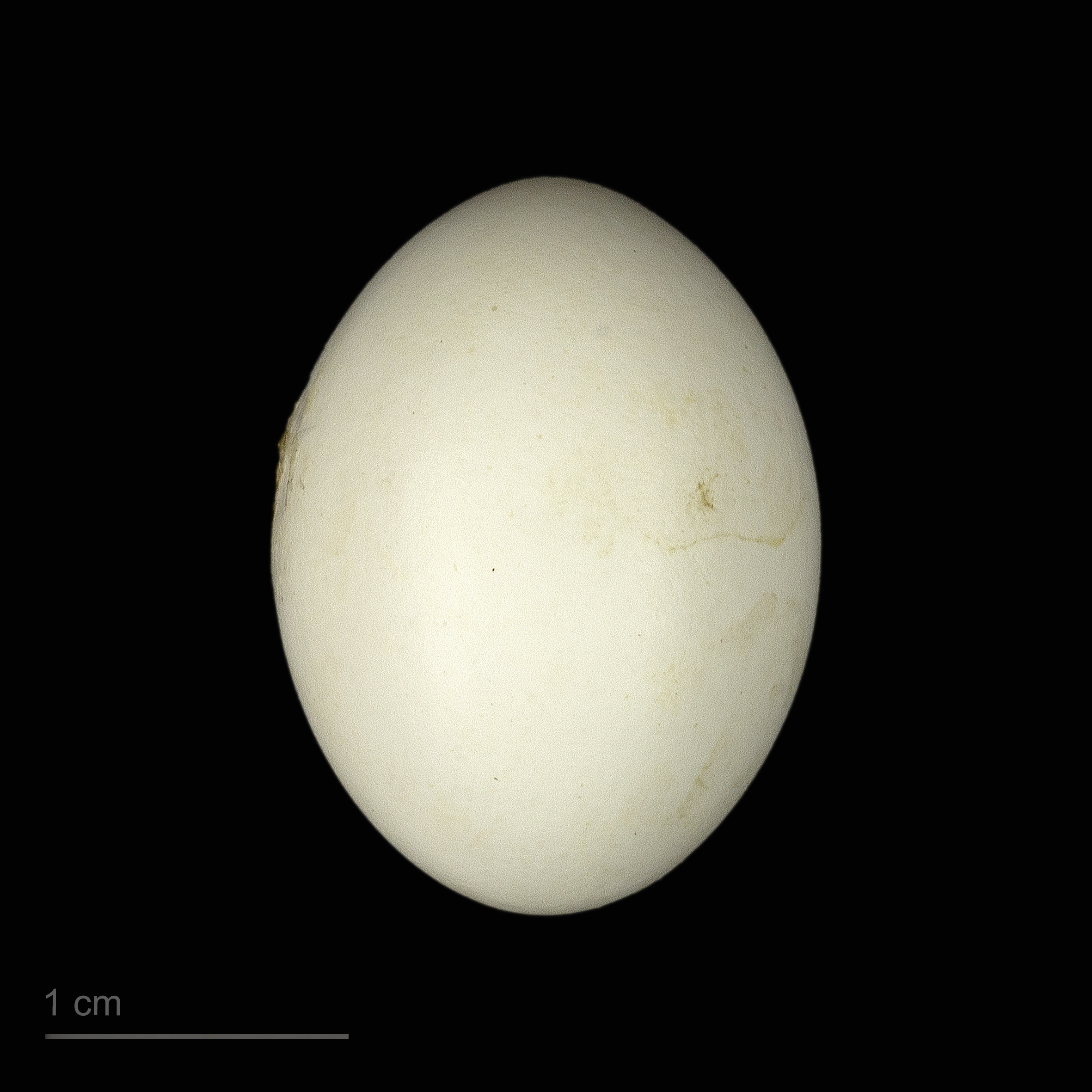
Zenaida aurita aurita - MHNT

It lays two white eggs on a flimsy platform, built on a tree or shrub. It also nests in rock crevices, and on grassy vegetation if no predators are present. It has been recorded that some birds have up to 4 broods per year. Eggs take approximately two weeks to hatch, and the young chicks typically fledge after only two weeks in the nest. Parents feed the young pigeon's milk, a nutrient rich substance regurgitated from its crop.

=== Diet ===
These birds forage on the ground, mainly eating grains and seeds, sometimes also on insects. Zenaida doves frequently feed close to water. They often swallow fine gravel to assist with digestion, and will also ingest salt from mineral rich soils or livestock salt licks. It is thought the salt aids in egg formation and/or production of pigeon milk.

== In culture ==
The Zenaida dove is the national bird of the British Overseas Territory of Anguilla, in the northeastern Caribbean, where it is locally known as "turtle dove". Zenaida doves are commonly hunted as a game bird.

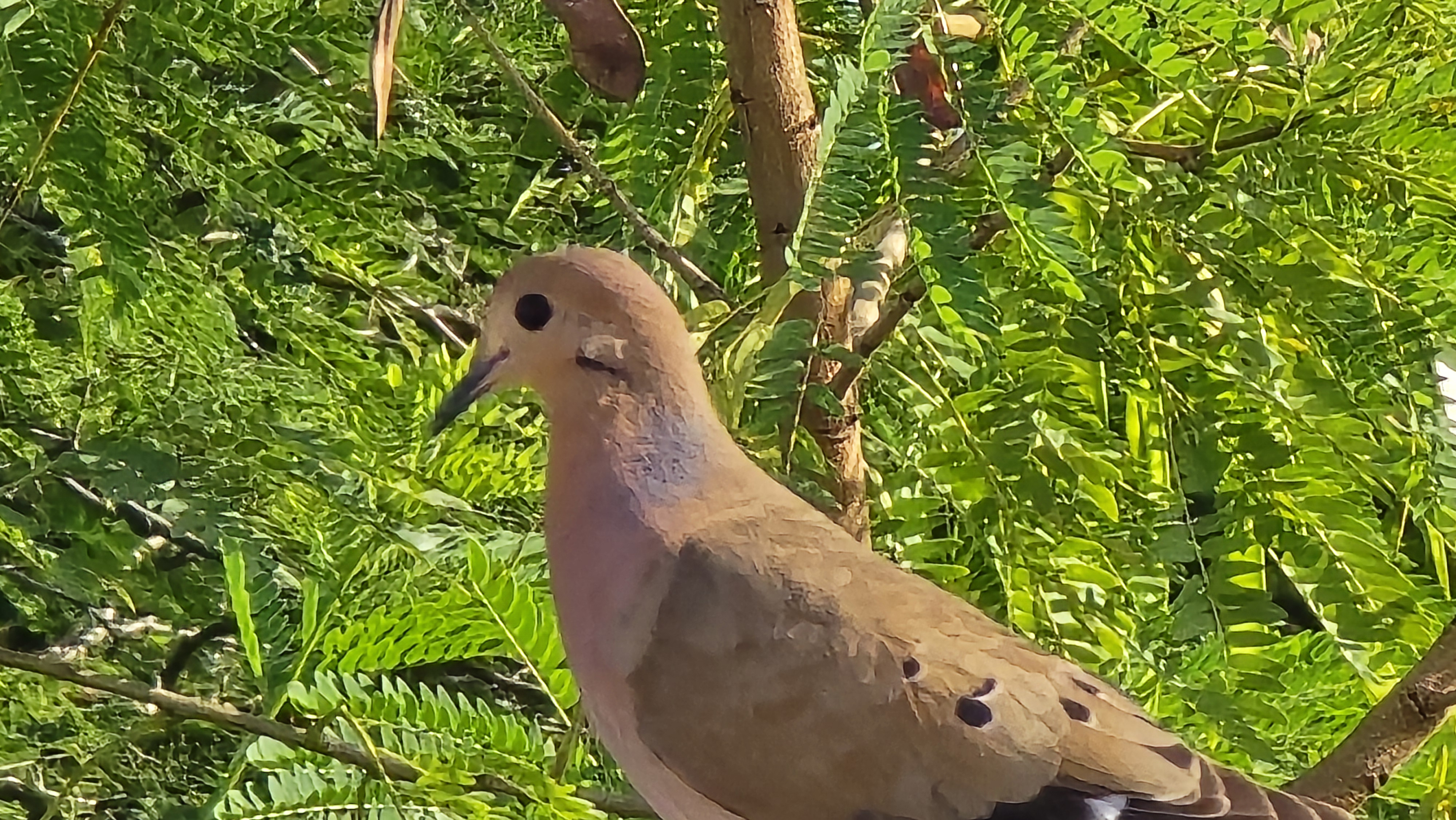
The national bird of Anguilla.
