= Pericalymma crassipes =

Scientific classification
- Kingdom: Plantae
- Clade: Tracheophytes
- Clade: Angiosperms
- Clade: Eudicots
- Clade: Rosids
- Order: Myrtales
- Family: Myrtaceae
- Genus: Pericalymma
- Species: P. crassipes

Binomial name
- Pericalymma crassipes (Lehm.) Schauer

Synonyms
- Leptospermum crassipes Lehm.

Species of shrub

Pericalymma crassipes is a species of flowering plant of the family Myrtaceae. It is endemic to Western Australia.

The erect to sprawling shrub typically grows to a height of 0.1 to 0.4 metres (0.3 to 1.3 ft). It blooms between September and November producing white-green-pink flowers.

It is found in swamps and on seasonally wet flats in the South West and Great Southern regions of Western Australia where it grows in peaty sand to clay soils.
