= Pericalymma spongiocaule =

Scientific classification
- Kingdom: Plantae
- Clade: Tracheophytes
- Clade: Angiosperms
- Clade: Eudicots
- Clade: Rosids
- Order: Myrtales
- Family: Myrtaceae
- Genus: Pericalymma
- Species: P. spongiocaule

Binomial name
- Pericalymma spongiocaule Cranfield

Species of flowering plant

Pericalymma spongiocaule is a plant species of the family Myrtaceae endemic to Western Australia.

The erect typically grows to a height of 1.6 metres (5.2 ft). It blooms between October and January producing white-pink flowers.

It is found adjacent to sites with permanent water in the Peel, South West and Great Southern regions of Western Australia where it grows in sandy peaty soils over gravel.
