= Pericalymma megaphyllum =

Conservation status
- Priority One — Poorly Known Taxa (DEC)

Scientific classification
- Kingdom: Plantae
- Clade: Tracheophytes
- Clade: Angiosperms
- Clade: Eudicots
- Clade: Rosids
- Order: Myrtales
- Family: Myrtaceae
- Genus: Pericalymma
- Species: P. megaphyllum

Binomial name
- Pericalymma megaphyllum Cranfield

Species of flowering plant

Pericalymma megaphyllum is a plant species of the family Myrtaceae endemic to Western Australia.

The erect typically grows to a height of 0.35 metres (1.1 ft). It blooms in November producing white-pink flowers.

It is found on elevated watershed areas in the South West regions of Western Australia between Nannup and Augusta where it grows sandy clay soils over laterite.
