= Swamp tea tree =

Swamp tea tree is a common name for several plants and may refer to:

- Melaleuca dealbata
- Melaleuca irbyana
- Pericalymma ellipticum, endemic to Western Australia
