= Kunzea affinis =

Scientific classification
- Kingdom: Plantae
- Clade: Tracheophytes
- Clade: Angiosperms
- Clade: Eudicots
- Clade: Rosids
- Order: Myrtales
- Family: Myrtaceae
- Genus: Kunzea
- Species: K. affinis

Binomial name
- Kunzea affinis S.Moore

Species of shrub

Kunzea affinis is a flowering plant in the myrtle family, Myrtaceae and is endemic to the south-west of Western Australia. It is a shrub with many branches, small crowded leaves, and five-petalled pink flowers in early spring.

== Description ==
Kunzea affinis is a shrub which grows to a height of up to 1.5 m (5 ft) and a width of about 1 m (3 ft). It usually has a few erect branched which have many short but intricate side branches and which are hairy when young. The leaf stalk is less than 1 mm (0.04 in) long and the leaf blade is linear, 3.5–6 mm (0.1–0.2 in) long and less than 1 mm (0.04 in) wide. The leaves are erect or pressed against the stem and have long hairs, mainly along their margins.

The flowers are arranged in groups of two to five flowers on the ends of the branches which continue to grow after flowering. The flowers are surrounded by woolly bracts and bracteoles about 1.5 mm (0.06 in) long. The five sepals are broad egg-shaped, glabrous and 1–1.5 mm (0.04–0.06 in) long. The five petals are oval to spoon-shaped, 2.5–3 mm (0.098–0.12 in) long and rose-pink. There are about 20 to 25 rose-pink stamens 2.5–3 mm (0.098–0.12 in) long with bright yellow anthers on the end. Flowering occurs from August to October and is followed by fruit which are small capsules which release many small seeds when ripe.

== Taxonomy and naming ==
Kunzea affinis was first formally described in 1920 by Spencer Moore and the description was published in Journal of the Adelaide Botanic Garden. The specific epithet (affinis) is a Latin word meaning "related to". (Moore noted the similarity of this species to Kunzea pauciflora.)

== Distribution and habitat ==
This kunzea grows in sandy soils in a range of habitats including kwongan, in scrubby vegetation, and along rivers, mainly between Ravensthorpe, the Stirling Range, Cape Riche and Lake King in the Coolgardie, Esperance Plains and Mallee biogeographic regions.

== Conservation ==
Kunzea affinis is classified as "not threatened" by the Western Australian Government Department of Parks and Wildlife.

== Use in horticulture ==
This kunzea has been in cultivation for many years. It can be most easily propagated from cuttings collected in spring or early summer or from seed but the seed is difficult to collect. This kunzea does best in areas where rainfall is mostly in winter and in well-drained soils. It will tolerate some shade and at least moderate frost and can be kept in shape by light tip pruning.
