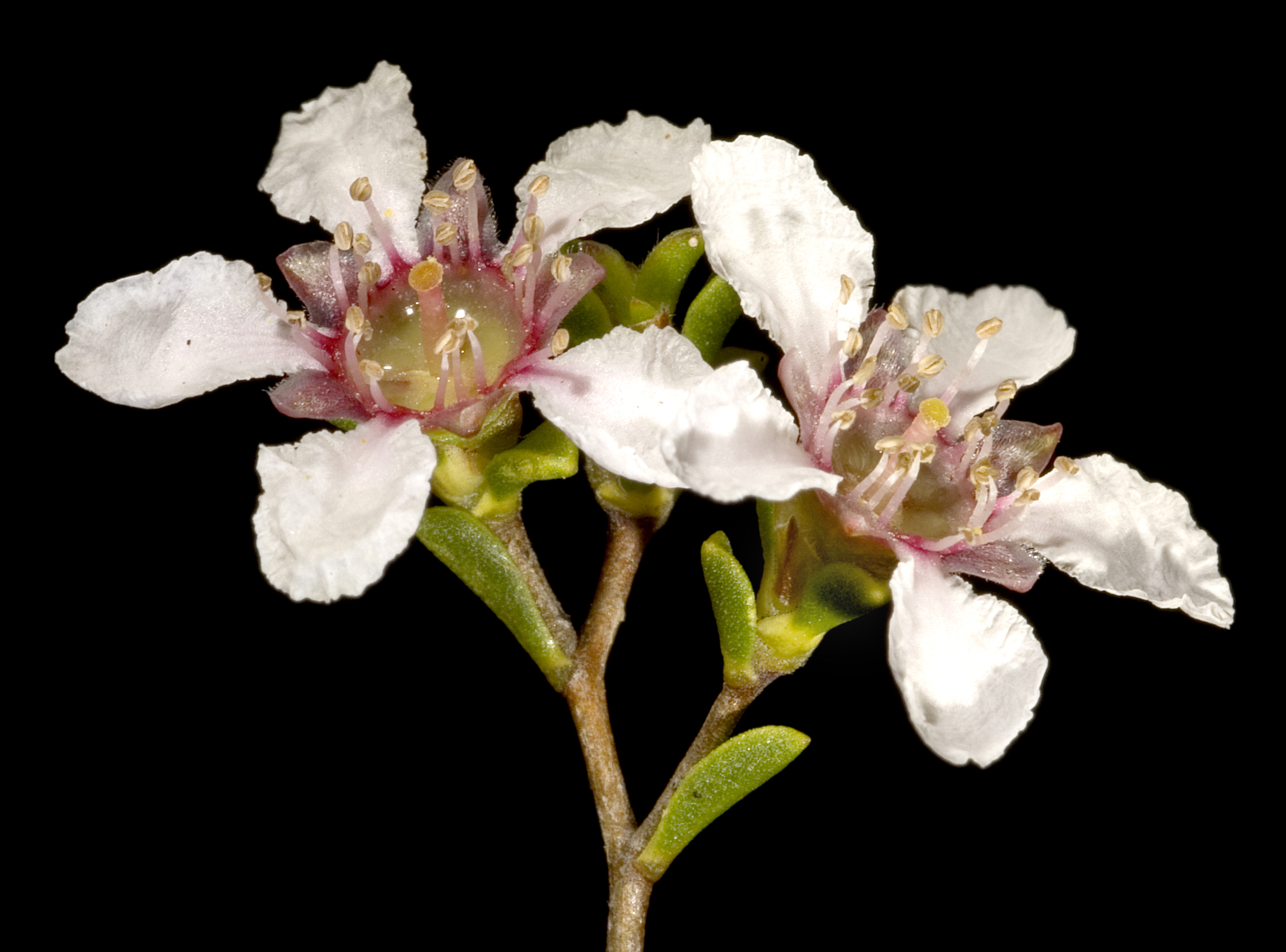

Scientific classification
- Kingdom: Plantae
- Clade: Tracheophytes
- Clade: Angiosperms
- Clade: Eudicots
- Clade: Rosids
- Order: Myrtales
- Family: Myrtaceae
- Genus: Pericalymma
- Species: P. ellipticum

Binomial name
- Pericalymma ellipticum (Endl.) Schauer

= Pericalymma ellipticum =

Species of shrub

Pericalymma ellipticum, commonly known as a swamp teatree, is a plant species of the family Myrtaceae endemic to Western Australia.

The erect shrub typically grows to a height of 3 metres (9.8 ft). It blooms between October and January producing white-pink flowers.

It is found on elevated areas in swamps and on seasonally wet flats in the Peel, South West and Great Southern regions of Western Australia where it grows in leached sands to clay soils over laterite.
