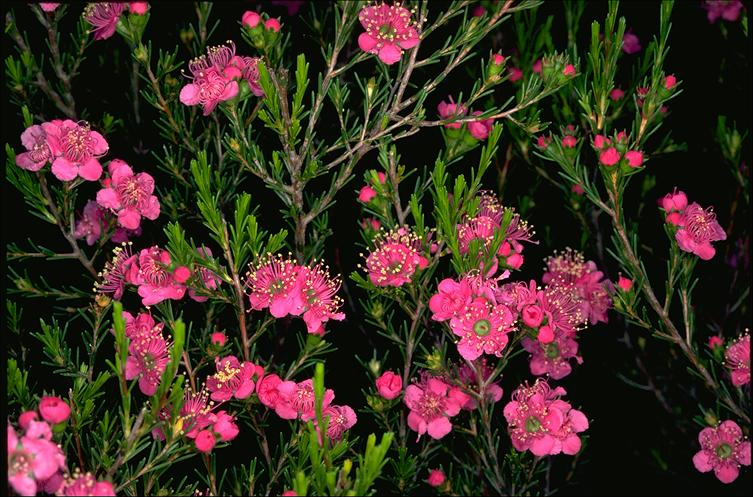
- Kunzea pauciflora in the ANBG

Conservation status
- Priority Four — Rare Taxa (DEC)

Scientific classification
- Kingdom: Plantae
- Clade: Tracheophytes
- Clade: Angiosperms
- Clade: Eudicots
- Clade: Rosids
- Order: Myrtales
- Family: Myrtaceae
- Genus: Kunzea
- Species: K. pauciflora

Binomial name
- Kunzea pauciflora Schauer

= Kunzea pauciflora =

Mount Melville kunzea

Species of flowering plant

Kunzea pauciflora, the Mount Melville kunzea, is a species of flowering plant in the myrtle family Myrtaceae, and is endemic to a small area on the south coast of Western Australia. It is a shrub with the stems densely branched near their ends, linear leaves and one, two or three pink flowers near the ends of the branches but usually only at the top of the shrub.

== Description ==
Kunzea pauciflora is a shrub that typically grows to a height of 0.35–1.5 m (1 ft 2 in – 4 ft 11 in) with stems that are densely branched near their ends. The leaves are linear, 3.5–6.5 mm (0.14–0.26 in) long and 0.4–1.0 mm (0.016–0.039 in) wide on a petiole 0.4–1.0 mm (0.016–0.039 in) long. The flowers appear singly, in pairs or groups of three to five on the ends of long shoots or branches. There are egg-shaped bracts 2.5–3.5 mm (0.098–0.138 in) long and about 1.5 mm (0.059 in) wide and pairs of lance-shaped bracteoles at the base of the flowers. The sepals are triangular, 2–2.6 mm (0.079–0.102 in) long and glabrous and the petals are pink, egg-shaped to more or less round and 3.5–4 mm (0.14–0.16 in) long. There are between 39 and 46 stamens 3.3–4.1 mm (0.13–0.16 in) long arranged in several whorls. Flowering occurs between August and November and the fruit is an urn-shaped capsule with the erect sepals attached.

== Taxonomy and naming ==
Kunzea pauciflora was first formally described in 1844 by Johannes Conrad Schauer and published in Johann Georg Christian Lehmann's book Plantae Preissianae from a specimen collected near Cape Riche. The specific epithet (pauciflora) is derived from the Latin words paucus meaning "few" or "little" and flos meaning "flower" or "blossom".

== Distribution and habitat ==
Mount Melville kunzea is found on hillside and slopes near the coast around Cape Riche in the Fitzgerald River National Park, where it grows in gravelly sandy or loamy soils over limestone or sandstone.

== Conservation status ==
Kunzea pauciflora is classified as "Priority Four" by the Government of Western Australia Department of Parks and Wildlife, meaning that it is rare or near threatened.
