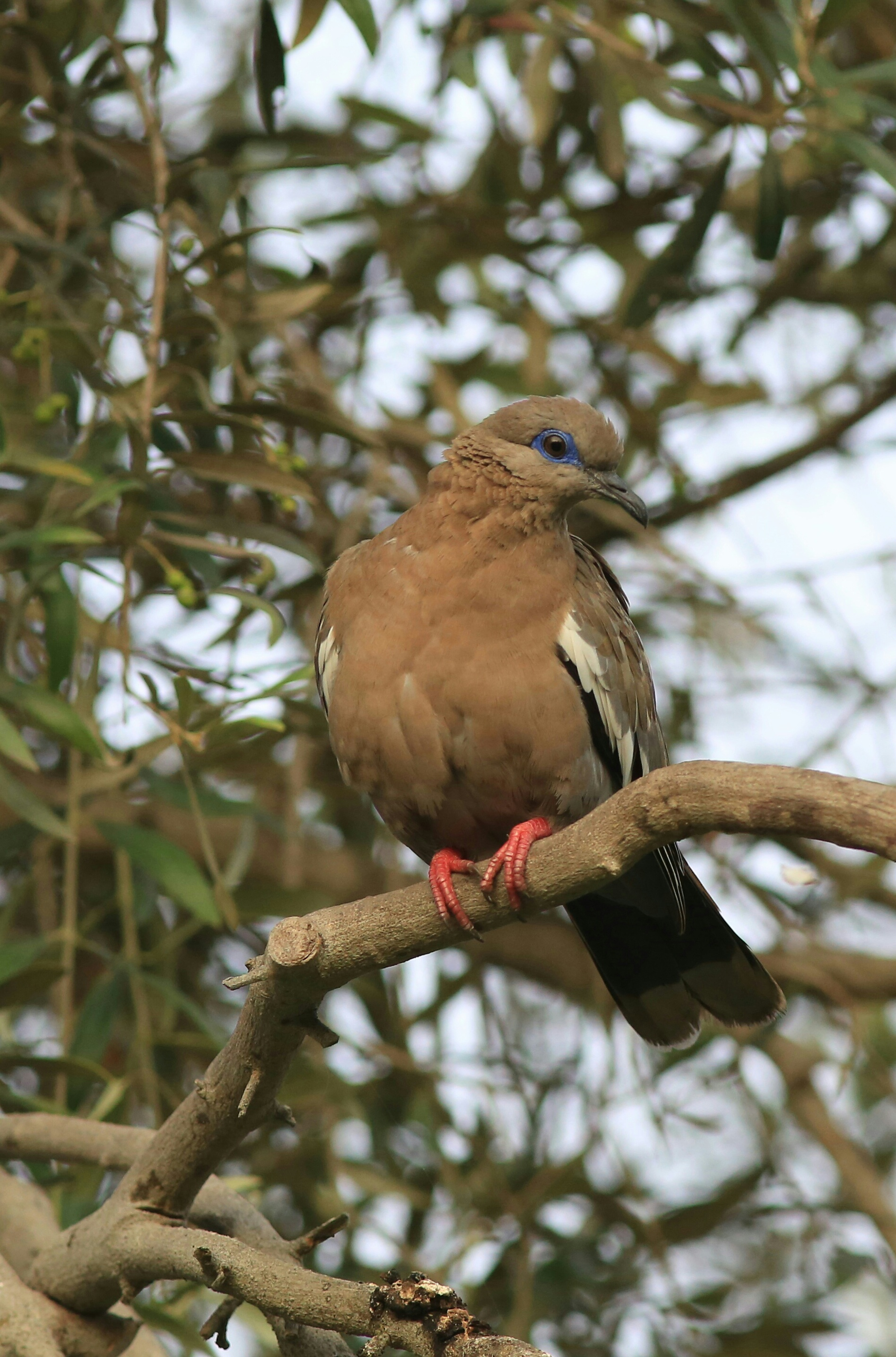
- In Lima, Peru

Conservation status
- Least Concern (IUCN 3.1)

Scientific classification
- Kingdom: Animalia
- Phylum: Chordata
- Class: Aves
- Order: Columbiformes
- Family: Columbidae
- Genus: Zenaida
- Species: Z. meloda

Binomial name
- Zenaida meloda (Tschudi, 1843)

= West Peruvian dove =

Species of bird

The West Peruvian dove or Pacific dove (Zenaida meloda), known locally as tórtola melódica or cuculí, is a species of dove in the genus Zenaida found on the South American Pacific coast.

== Taxonomy ==
It was initially described by Swiss naturalist Johann Jakob von Tschudi in 1843 as Columba meloda, based upon a holotype specimen collected from a western slope of the Andes mountains in Peru. It has previously been considered conspecific with the white-winged dove (Zenaida asiatica), but has been retained as its own species based on genetic data and differences in plumage, soft part coloration, and vocalization and territorial song, which is not a learned behavior in doves.

Speciation between the white-winged dove and West Peruvian dove likely took place between 2 to 2.7 million years ago, beginning shortly after the formation of the Central American land bridge (around 3 million years ago), which enabled the dispersal of North American Zenaida doves into Central & South America and facilitated speciation.

The white-winged dove and the West Peruvian dove are each others' closest relatives, and they together form a clade which is a sister group to the rest of genus Zenaida.

- Zenaida
  - - White-winged dove (Z. asiatica)
    - West Peruvian dove (Z. meloda)
  - - Zenaida dove (Z. aurita)
    - - Eared dove (Z. auriculata)
      - - Socorro dove (Z. graysoni)
        - Mourning dove (Z. macroura)

Cladogram showing the relationships of six species of doves in the genus Zenaida. This study did not include the Galápagos dove (Z. galapagoensis).

== Description ==
The West Peruvian dove is a medium-sized dove, being 25–33 cm (9.8–13.0 in) and weighing around 216 g (0.476 lb). Adults of either sex are similar, with brownish-gray upperparts, a buff face and neck that fades into gray at the chest, and warm gray underparts with pink-red to pinkish tinging. Wings have a prominent white band, which is visible as a distinctive white crescent at rest and in flight. Tailfeathers are tipped with gray and the tail has a broad white corner. Legs and feet are red. It has a featherless ring of bright indigo to violet-blue skin around each eye. Juveniles are similar to adults, but are lighter in color, lack the bright blue eye rings, and have brownish-pink legs and feet.

As compared to the white-winged dove, it has a stouter bill, deeper vinaceous coloration to the underparts, a gray crown and nape instead of pink-tinged, and a darker, deeper blue ring around the eye, which itself is greyish-brown.

Its song is a low-pitched, rhythmic, monotonous cooing Who.. huLOO..hu..huLOO..hu..huLOO for five to six seconds, repeated at varying intervals. It also uses shorter phrases, such as who...huLOO. The West Peruvian dove is also known for its coo-coo-LEE call, which gives rise to its local name of cuculí. Vocalization occurs year-round and throughout the day, especially during breeding season. The West Peruvian dove's vocal range is between 377 - 566 Hz.

== Distribution and habitat ==
West Peruvian doves are found along the Pacific coast of South America, ranging from southwestern Ecuador to central Chile and southern Argentina. It is generally found from 0–3,000 m (0–9,843 ft), although in Chile it has been recorded at elevations of up to 4,200 m (13,800 ft). It is a common bird of many arid open and semi-open habitats, including desert lowlands and foothills, palm oases, coastal valleys and plains, scrubland, and dry open savanna. It is also readily found in human-altered habitats such as croplands, irrigated valleys, city parks and gardens, and urban areas.

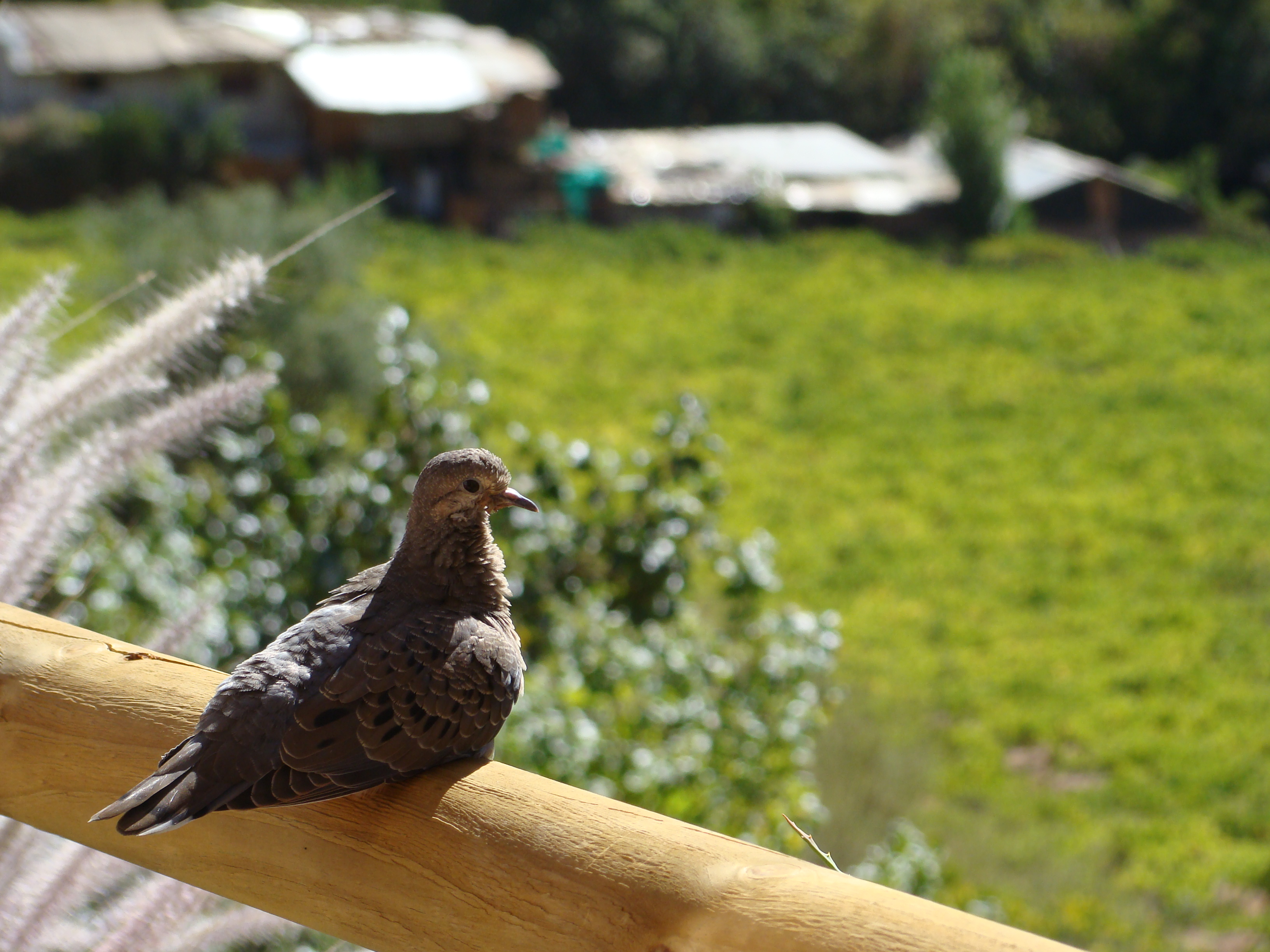
A West Peruvian dove resting on a wooden rail in a garden, in Valle del Elqui, northern Chile.

It is well-suited to colonizing new areas, and West Peruvian doves have been expanding their range further southwards since the 1990s, with records in northwest Argentina suggesting they can successfully cross the Andes. In the 1970s, the southern extent of its population reached only the northernmost regions of Chile. As early as 1993, they were believed to be expanding their range further into northern Chile. By the mid-2010s, the West Peruvian dove was being reported recurrently in Chile's Maule Region and Argentina's Neuquén and Río Negro provinces, and has been recorded as far south as the Biobío Region in Chile and Santa Cruz Province in Argentina.

The first confirmed record of the West Peruvian dove east of the Andes mountains, and the first record of it in Argentina, comes from Villa Unión in La Rioja Province, where it was observed in 2007, although local anecdotal reports suggest the species may have been present in the region as long as twenty years. It has since expanded into western and central Argentina, largely following major river valleys and urban areas; it has reached the Atlantic coast through the Chubut River valley, where it is now reportedly common near Villa Dique Florentino Ameghino, and there is even one report of the bird on the Falkland Islands.

The route through which the bird is expanding its range further into southern Argentina is not entirely clear. In northern Patagonia, dispersal appears to be facilitated primarily through western mountain valleys. However, it remains uncommon and apparently not well-established in the Villa Unión area, despite a relatively higher abundance in central Argentina. Greater distances between urban or agricultural areas and river valleys in western Argentina results in less available suitable habitat for the West Peruvian dove. It is possible that the bird's dispersal into southern Argentina is occurring largely from the east, in association with populations established on the Atlantic coast, as opposed to through western valleys.

== Behavior and ecology ==
It adapts well to agricultural areas and urban spaces, and has been found nesting on roof eaves and drainages, window box planters, indoors plant bots, shed bases, pillars, utility poles, electricity wires, and roadsides. It feeds on the ground and in trees, eating primarily grains and seeds, and has been observed feeding alongside the eared dove (Zenaida auriculata).

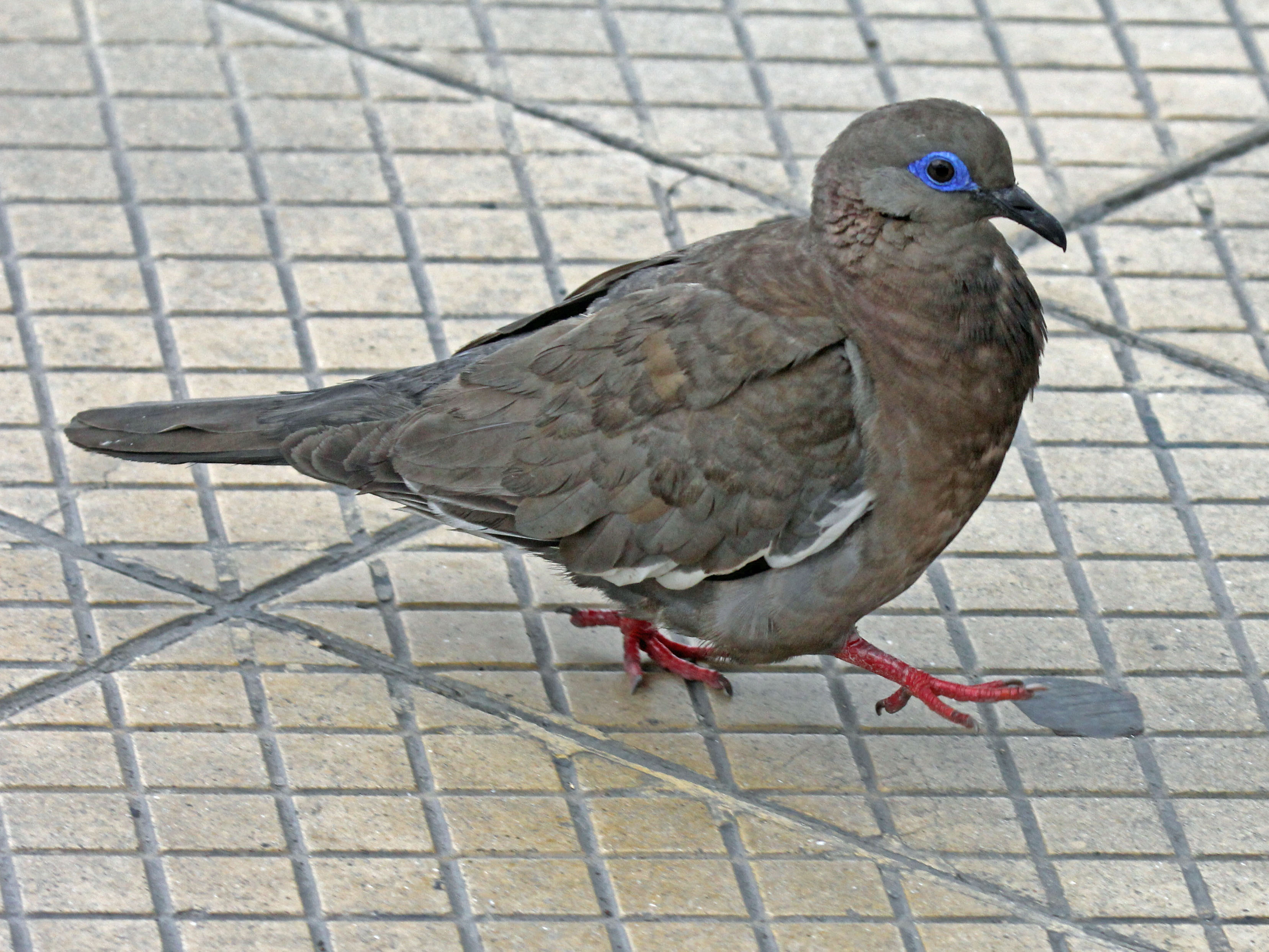
A West Peruvian dove in Lima, Peru.

West Peruvian doves breed in scattered pairs. In Chile, between Arica and Antofagasta, it has been observed to breed throughout the year, while from Coquimbo southwards it appears to be an austral spring breeder (August - December) and in southwestern Ecuador it breeds from February to March. The male will retrieve nest-building materials over two to five days, including sticks from species like yellow cordia (Cordia lutea), herbs, and other plant material, and bring them to the chosen nest site, where the female uses them to construct a shallow platform nest. The West Peruvian dove nests around 1.2–5.8 m (3.9–19.0 ft) above the ground, often in trees such as tamarugo (Strombocarpa tamarugo), tipu (Tipuana tipu), and Brazilian peppertree (Schinus terebinthifolius). It also nests in introduced species such as the Douglas fir (Pseudotsuga menziesii), variegated croton (Codiaeum variegatum), olive (Olea europaea), and sweet orange trees (Citrus × sinensis).

One to two cream to white eggs are laid and incubated for 13 to 15 days. Both parents incubate the eggs; typically, the male will incubate from morning to afternoon, and the female from afternoon to the next morning. Chicks are cared for by the parents for 11 to 15 days after hatching.

== Gallery ==
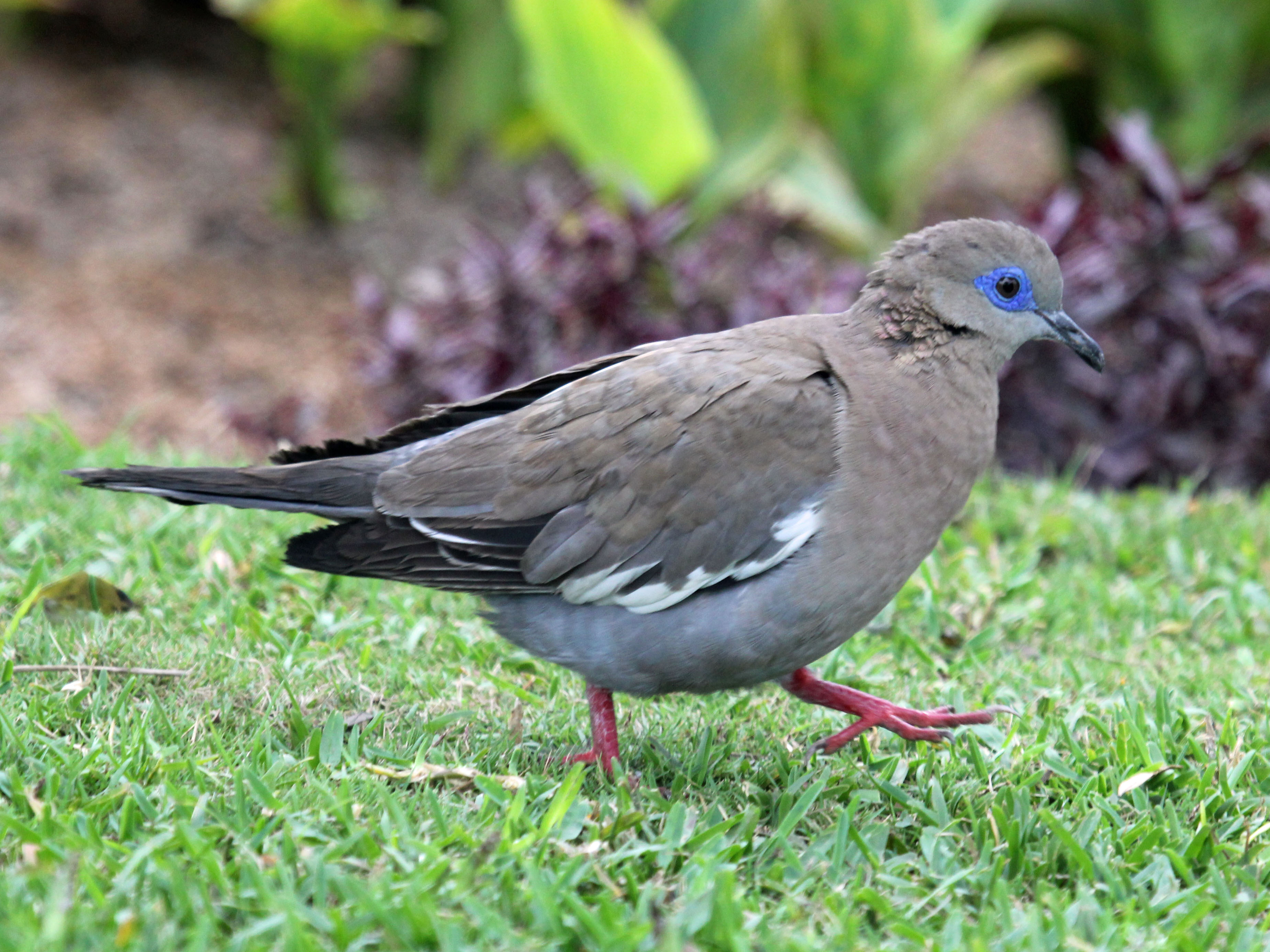

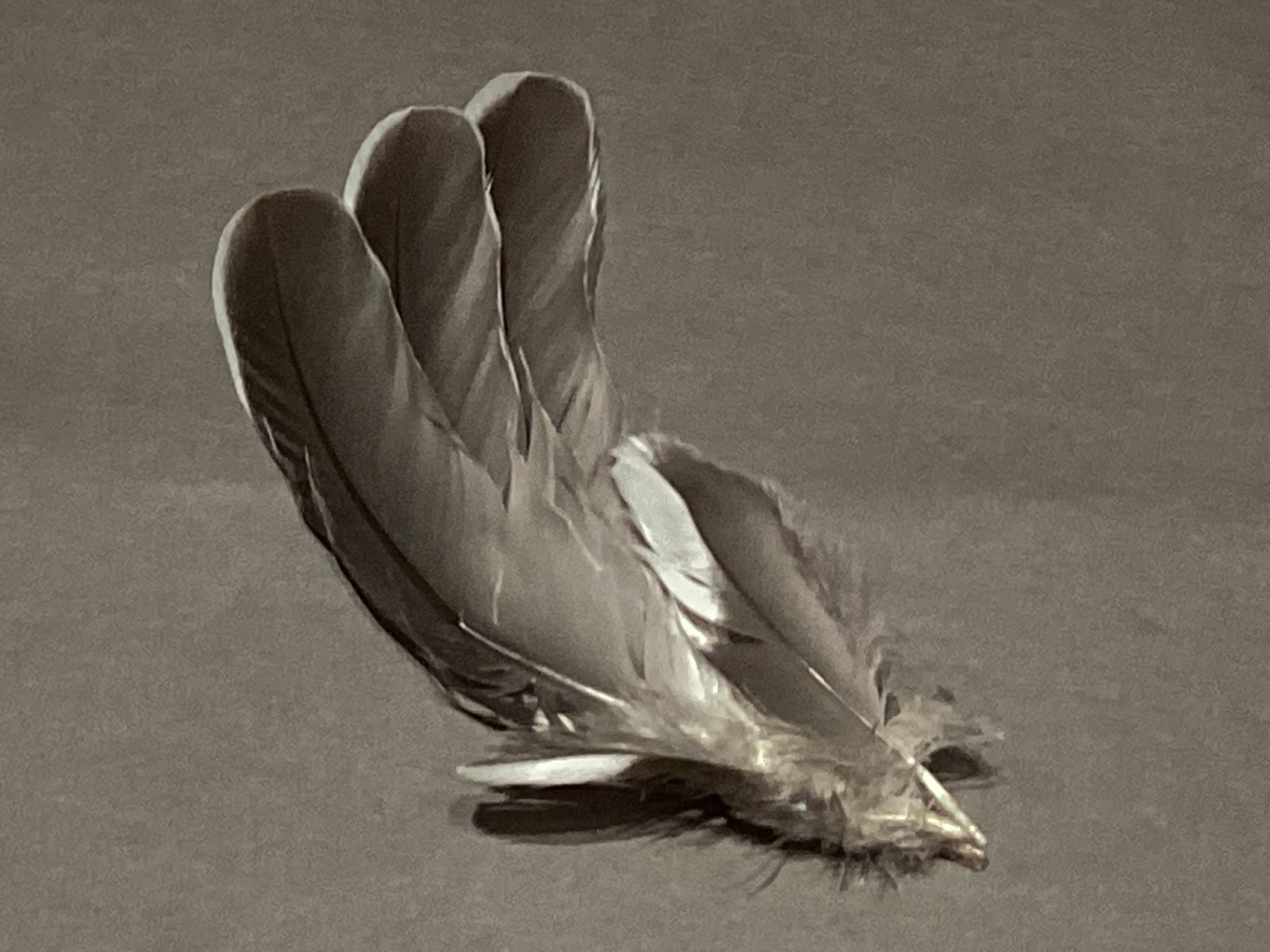
Secondary feathers of the West Peruvian dove

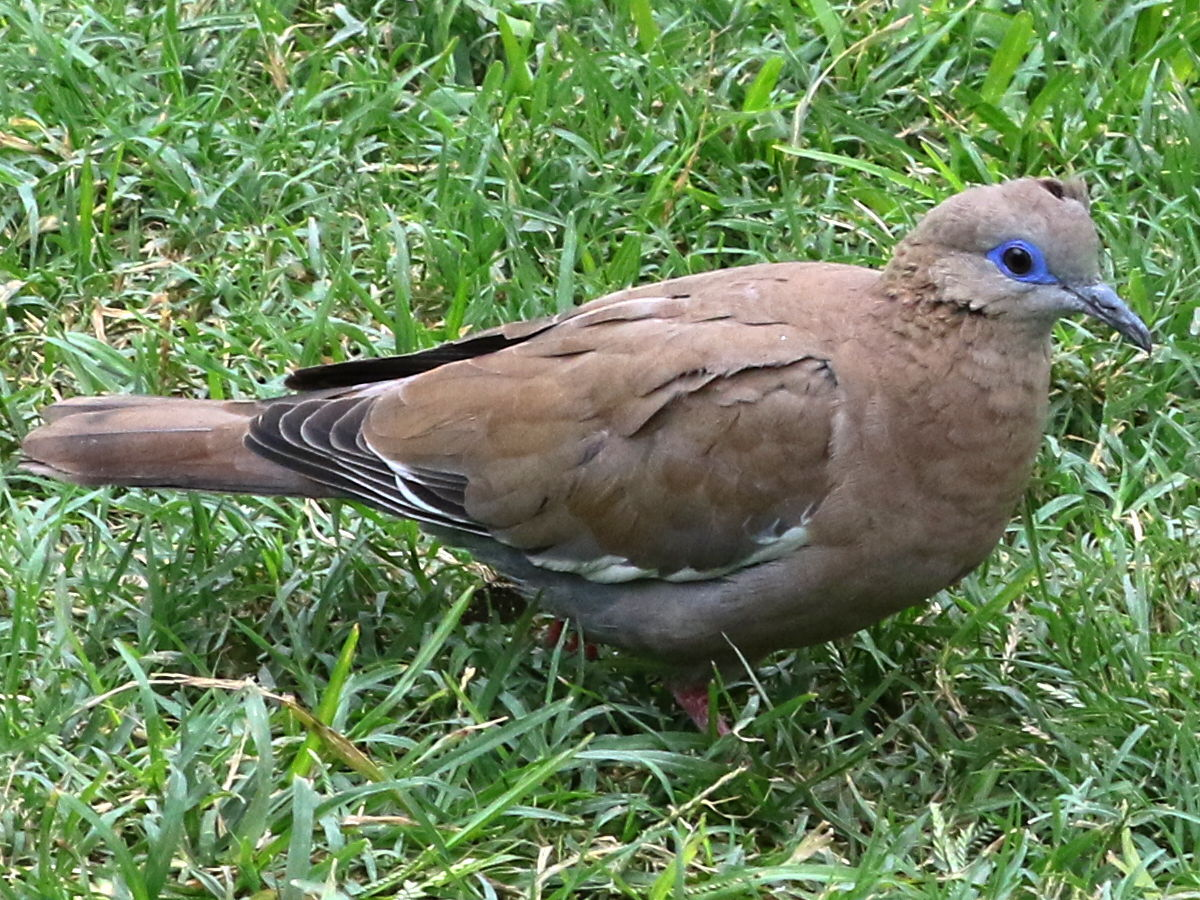
