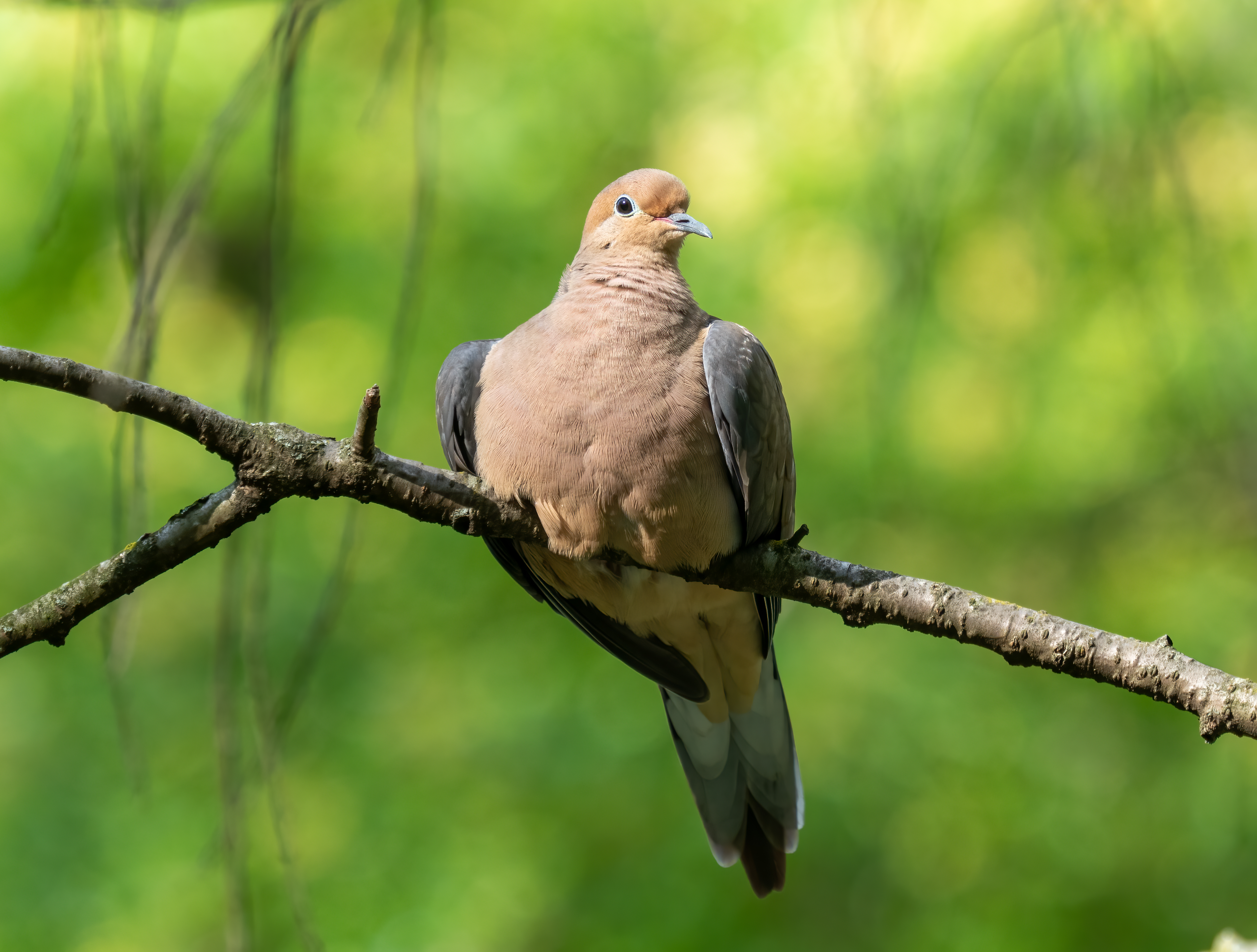
- In Brooklyn, New York

Conservation status
- Least Concern (IUCN 3.1)

Scientific classification
- Kingdom: Animalia
- Phylum: Chordata
- Class: Aves
- Order: Columbiformes
- Family: Columbidae
- Genus: Zenaida
- Species: Z. macroura

Binomial name
- Zenaida macroura (Linnaeus, 1758)

Subspecies
- See text
- Approximate distribution map Breeding Year-round Nonbreeding Introduced

Synonyms
- Columba macroura Linnaeus, 1758; Columba carolinensis Linnaeus, 1766; Ectopistes carolinensis (Linnaeus, 1766)

Audio
- Mourning dove vocalizations

= Mourning dove =

Mourning dove Temporal range: Pleistocene–present

North American bird in the family Columbidae

The mourning dove (Zenaida macroura) is a member of the dove family, Columbidae. The bird is also known as the American mourning dove, the rain dove, and colloquially as the turtle dove, and it was once known as the Carolina pigeon and Carolina turtledove. It is one of the most abundant and widespread North American birds and a popular gamebird, with more than 20 million birds (up to 70 million in some years) shot annually in the U.S., both for sport and meat. Its ability to sustain its population under such pressure is due to its prolific breeding; in warm areas, one pair may raise up to six broods of two young each in a single year. The wings make an unusual whistling sound upon take-off and landing, a form of sonation. The bird is a strong flier, capable of speeds up to 88 km/h (55 mph).

Mourning doves are light gray and brown and generally muted in color. Males and females are similar in appearance. The species is generally monogamous, with two squabs (young) per brood. Both parents incubate and care for the young. Mourning doves eat almost exclusively seeds, but the young are fed crop milk by their parents.

== Taxonomy ==
- Zenaida
  - - White-winged dove (Z. asiatica)
    - West Peruvian dove (Z. meloda)
  - - Zenaida dove (Z. aurita)
    - - Eared dove (Z. auriculata)
      - - Socorro dove (Z. graysoni)
        - Mourning dove (Z. macroura)

Cladogram showing the relationships of six species of doves in the genus Zenaida. This study did not include the Galápagos dove (Z. galapagoensis).

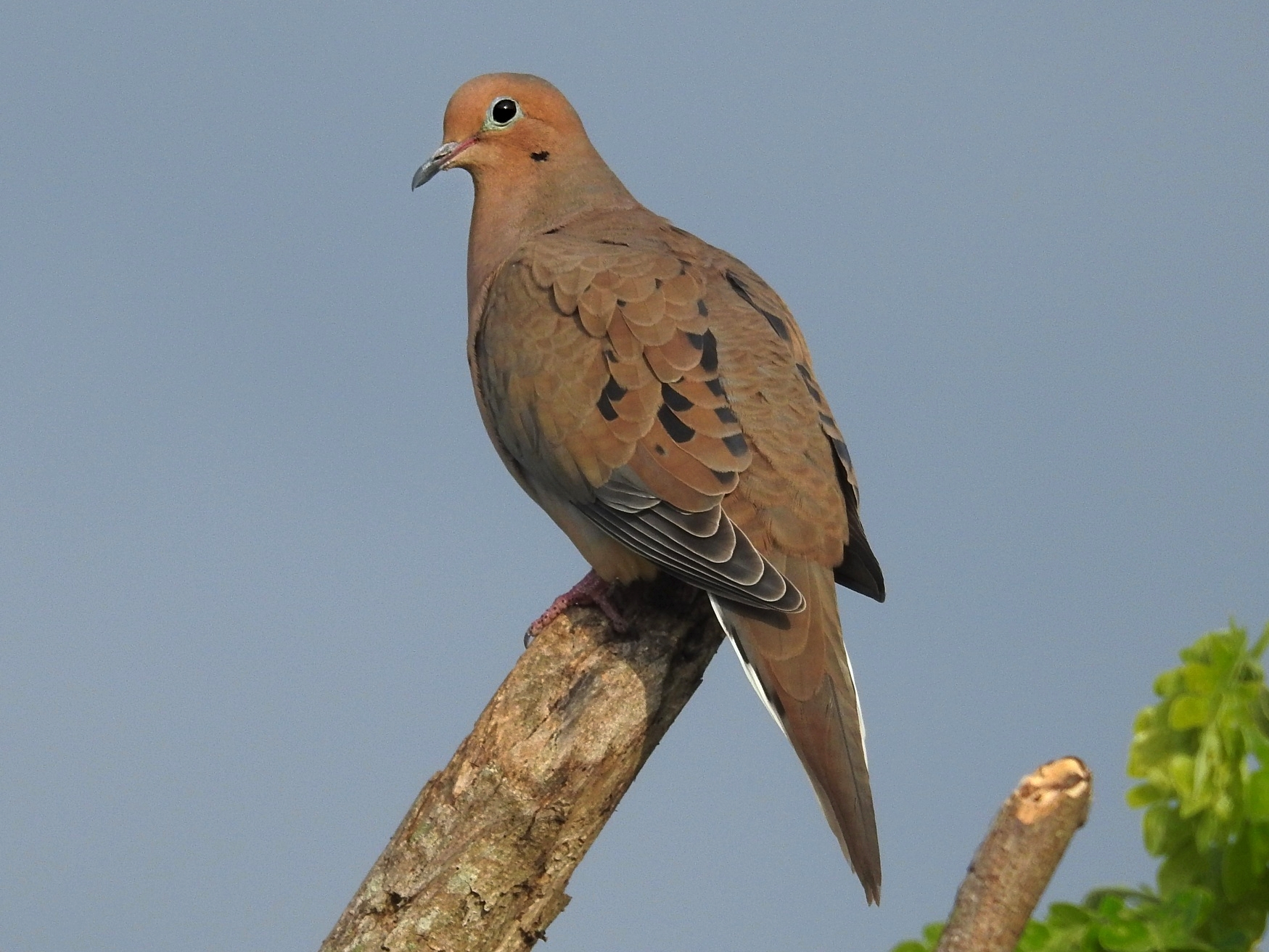
Nominate Z. m. macroura in the Dominican Republic

In 1731, the English naturalist Mark Catesby described and illustrated the passenger pigeon and the mourning dove on successive pages of his The Natural History of Carolina, Florida and the Bahama Islands. For the passenger pigeon, he used the common name "Pigeon of passage" and the scientific Latin Palumbus migratorius; for the mourning dove he used "Turtle of Carolina" and Turtur carolinensis. In 1743, the naturalist George Edwards included the mourning dove with the English name "long-tail'd dove" and the Latin name Columba macroura in his A Natural History of Uncommon Birds. Edwards's pictures of the male and female doves were drawn from live birds that had been shipped to England from the West Indies. In 1758, when the Swedish naturalist Carl Linnaeus updated his Systema Naturae for the tenth edition, he conflated the two species. He used the Latin name Columba macroura introduced by Edwards as the binomial name, but included a description mainly based on Catesby. He cited Edwards's description of the mourning dove and Catesby's description of the passenger pigeon. Linnaeus updated his Systema Naturae again in 1766 for the twelfth edition. He dropped Columba macroura and instead coined Columba migratoria for the passenger pigeon, Columba cariolensis for the mourning dove, and Columba marginata for Edwards's mourning dove.

To resolve the confusion over the binomial names of the two species, Francis Hemming proposed in 1952 that the International Commission on Zoological Nomenclature (ICZN) secure the specific name macroura for the mourning dove and migratorius for the passenger pigeon, since this was the intended use by the authors on whose work Linnaeus had based his description. This was accepted by the ICZN, which used its plenary powers to designate the species for the respective names in 1955.

The mourning dove is now placed in the genus Zenaida, introduced in 1838 by the French naturalist Charles Lucien Bonaparte and named after his wife Zénaïde Bonaparte. The specific epithet is from the Ancient Greek makros meaning "long" and -ouros meaning "-tailed".

The mourning dove is closely related to the eared dove (Zenaida auriculata) and the Socorro dove (Zenaida graysoni). Some authorities consider them a superspecies, and the three birds are sometimes classified in the separate genus Zenaidura, but the current classification has them as separate species in the genus Zenaida. In addition, the Socorro dove has at times been considered conspecific with the mourning dove, though several differences in behavior, call, and appearance justify separation as two different species. While the three species do form a subgroup of Zenaida, using a separate genus would interfere with the monophyly of Zenaida by making it paraphyletic.

There are five subspecies:

- Zenaida macroura marginella (Woodhouse, 1852) – Western Canada and Western United States to south central Mexico
- Zenaida macroura carolinensis (Linnaeus, 1766) – Eastern Canada and Eastern United States, Bermuda, Bahama Islands
- Zenaida macroura macroura (Linnaeus, 1758) – (nominate subspecies) Cuba, Hispaniola (Dominican Republic and Haiti), Puerto Rico, Jamaica
- Zenaida macroura clarionensis (Townsend, CH, 1890) – Clarion Island (off west Mexico)
- Zenaida macroura turturilla (Wetmore, 1956) – Costa Rica, west Panama

The ranges of most of the subspecies overlap slightly, with two in the United States and Canada. The West Indian subspecies is found throughout the Greater Antilles, and is also present in the Florida Keys. The eastern subspecies is found mainly in eastern North America, as well as Bermuda and the Bahamas. The western subspecies are found in western North America, including parts of Mexico. The Panamanian subspecies is in Central America. The Clarion Island subspecies is found only on Clarion Island, off Mexico's Pacific coast.

The mourning dove is sometimes called the "American mourning dove" to distinguish it from the distantly related mourning collared dove (Streptopelia decipiens) of Africa. It was also formerly known as the "Carolina turtledove" and the "Carolina pigeon". The "mourning" part of its common name comes from its doleful call.

The mourning dove was thought to be the passenger pigeon's closest living relative on morphological grounds until genetic analysis showed Patagioenas pigeons are more closely related. The mourning dove was even suggested to belong to the same genus, Ectopistes, and was listed by some authors as E. carolinensis. The passenger pigeon (Ectopistes migratorius) was hunted to extinction in the early 1900s.

== Description ==
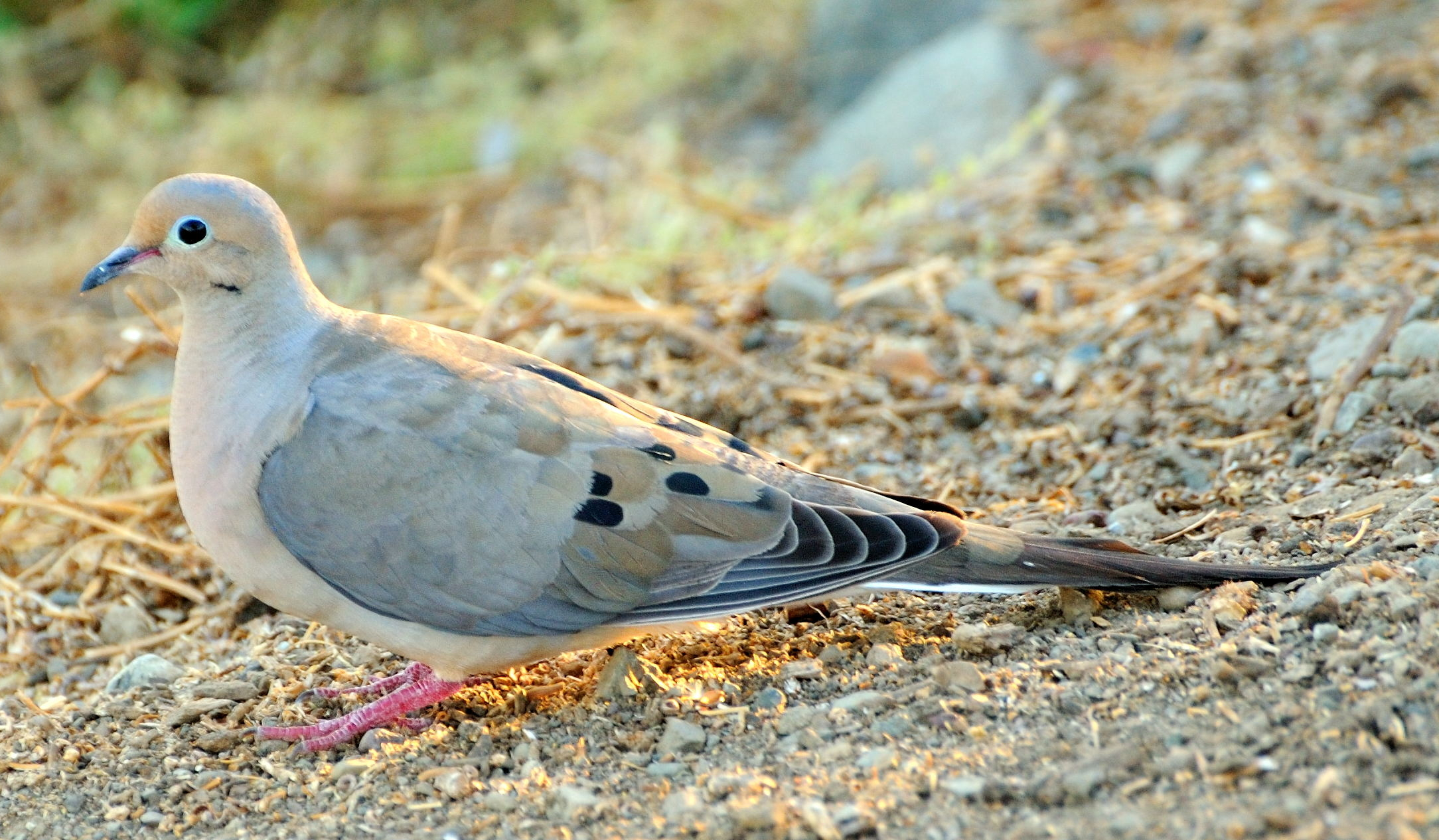
Z. m. marginella in California

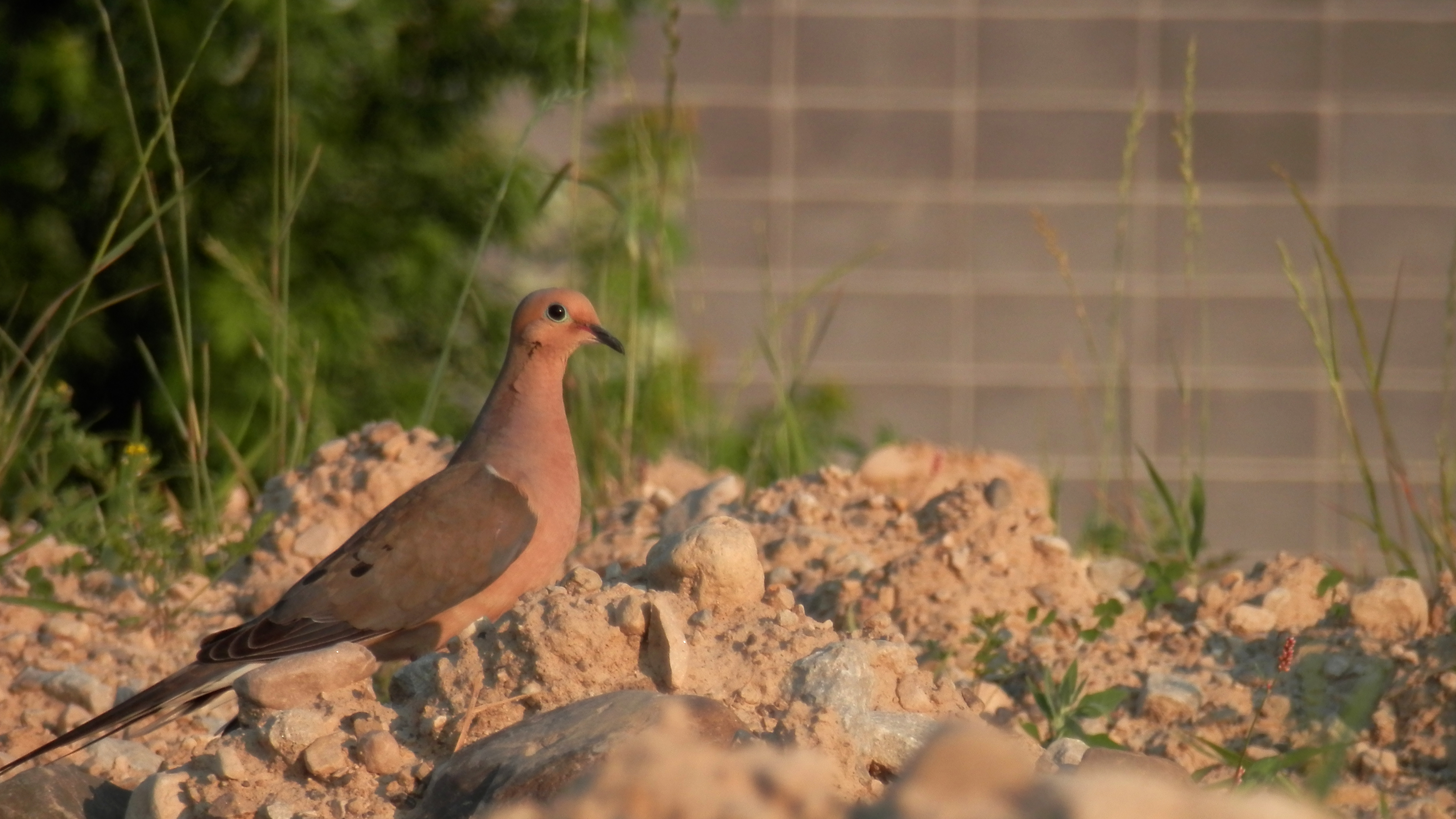
Z. m. carolinensis in Guelph, Ontario, Canada

Mourning dove on a seawall

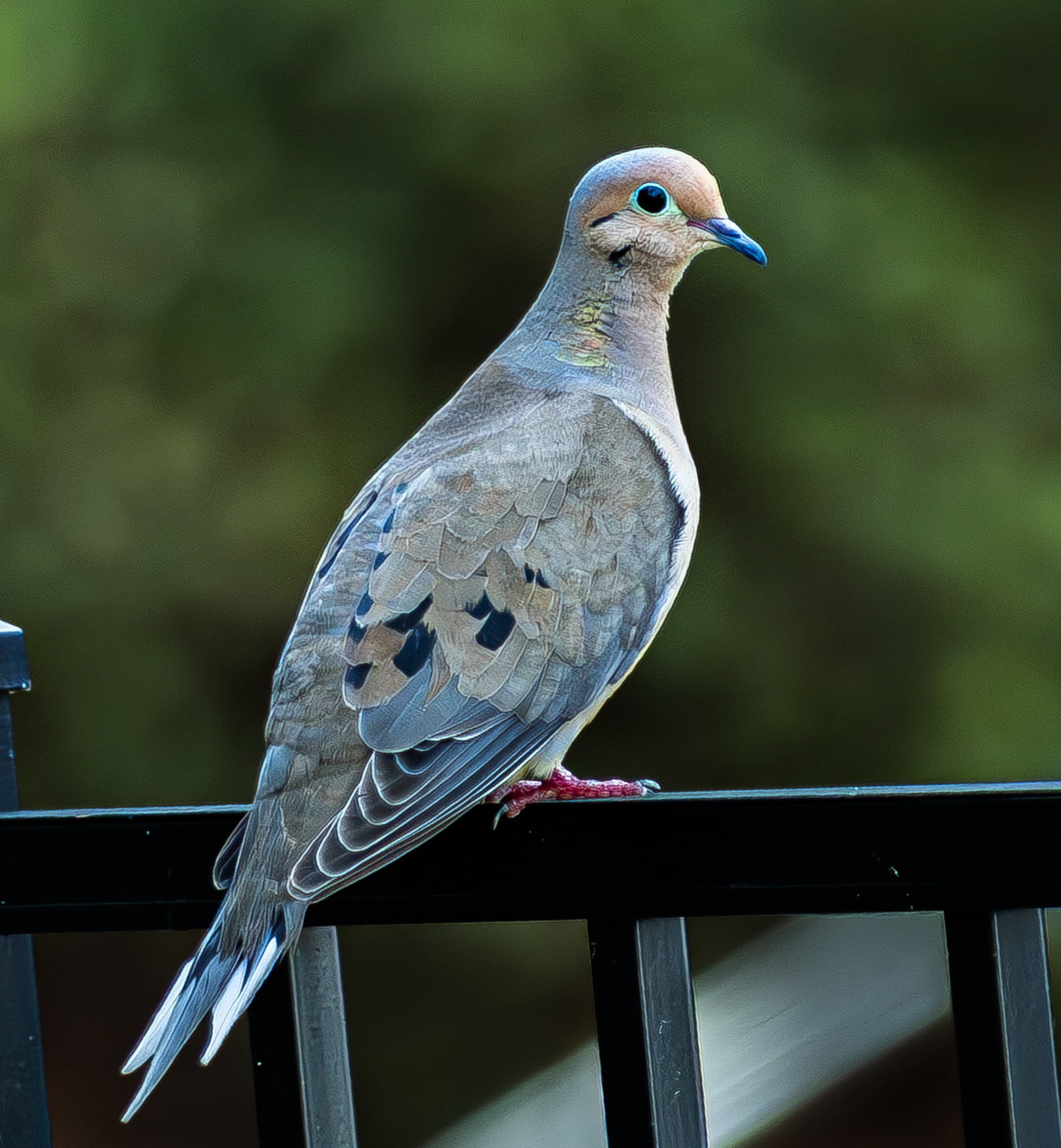
A Mourning Dove perched on a fence in the suburbs of Cary, North Carolina.

The mourning dove is a medium-sized, slender dove approximately 31 cm (12 in) in length. Mourning doves weigh 112–170 g (4.0–6.0 oz), usually closer to 128 g (4.5 oz). The mourning dove has a wingspan of 37–45 cm. The elliptical wings are broad, and the head is rounded. Its tail is long and tapered ("macroura" comes from the Greek words for "large" and "tail"). Mourning doves have perching feet, with three toes forward and one reversed. The legs are short and reddish colored. The beak is short and dark, usually a brown-black hue.

The plumage is generally light gray-brown above and lighter and pinkish below. The wings have black spotting, and the outer tail feathers are white, contrasting with the black inners. Below the eye is a distinctive crescent-shaped area of dark feathers. The eyes are dark, with light blue skin surrounding them. The adult male has bright purple-pink patches on the neck sides, with light pink coloring reaching the breast. Adult males possess a distinctly bluish-gray colored crown, which females lack. Females are similar in appearance but have more brown coloring overall and are slightly smaller than males. The iridescent feather patches on the neck above the shoulders are nearly absent but can be quite vivid on males. Juvenile birds have a scaly appearance and are generally darker.

Feather colors are generally believed to be relatively static, changing only by small amounts over periods of months. However, a 2011 study argued that since feathers have neither nerves or blood vessels, color changes must be caused by external stimuli. Researchers analyzed how feathers of iridescent mourning doves responded to stimulus changes of adding and evaporating water. As a result, it was discovered that iridescent feather color changed hue, became more chromatic, and increased overall reflectance by almost 50%. Transmission electron microscopy and thin-film models revealed that color is produced by thin-film interference from a single layer of keratin around the edge of feather barbules, under which lies a layer of air and melanosomes. Once the environmental conditions were changed, the most striking morphological difference was a twisting of colored barbules that exposed more of their surface area for reflection, which explains the observed increase in brightness. Overall, the researchers suggest that some plumage colors may be more changeable than previously thought possible.

All five subspecies of the mourning dove look similar and are not easily distinguishable. The nominate subspecies possesses shorter wings and are darker and more buff-colored than the "average" mourning dove. Z. m. carolinensis has longer wings and toes, a shorter beak, and is darker in color. The western subspecies has longer wings, a longer beak, and shorter toes, and is more muted and lighter in color. The Panama mourning dove has shorter wings and legs, a longer beak, and is grayer in color. The Clarion Island subspecies possesses larger feet, a larger beak, and is darker brown in color.

=== Vocalization ===
This species' call is a distinctive, plaintive cooOOoo-wooo-woo-woooo, uttered by males to attract females, and it may be mistaken for the call of an owl at first. During the call, the throat of the dove swells. Close up, a grating or throat-rattling sound may be heard preceding the first coo. Other sounds include a nested call (cooOOoo) by paired males to attract their female mates to the nest sites, a greeting call (a soft ork) by males upon rejoining their mates, and an alarm call (a short roo-oo) by either a male or female when threatened. In flight, the wings make a fluttery whistling sound that is hard to hear. The wing whistle is much louder and more noticeable upon take-off and landing. The mourning dove can also 'clap' its wings together when taking off, in a similar manner to the rock dove.

== Distribution and habitat ==
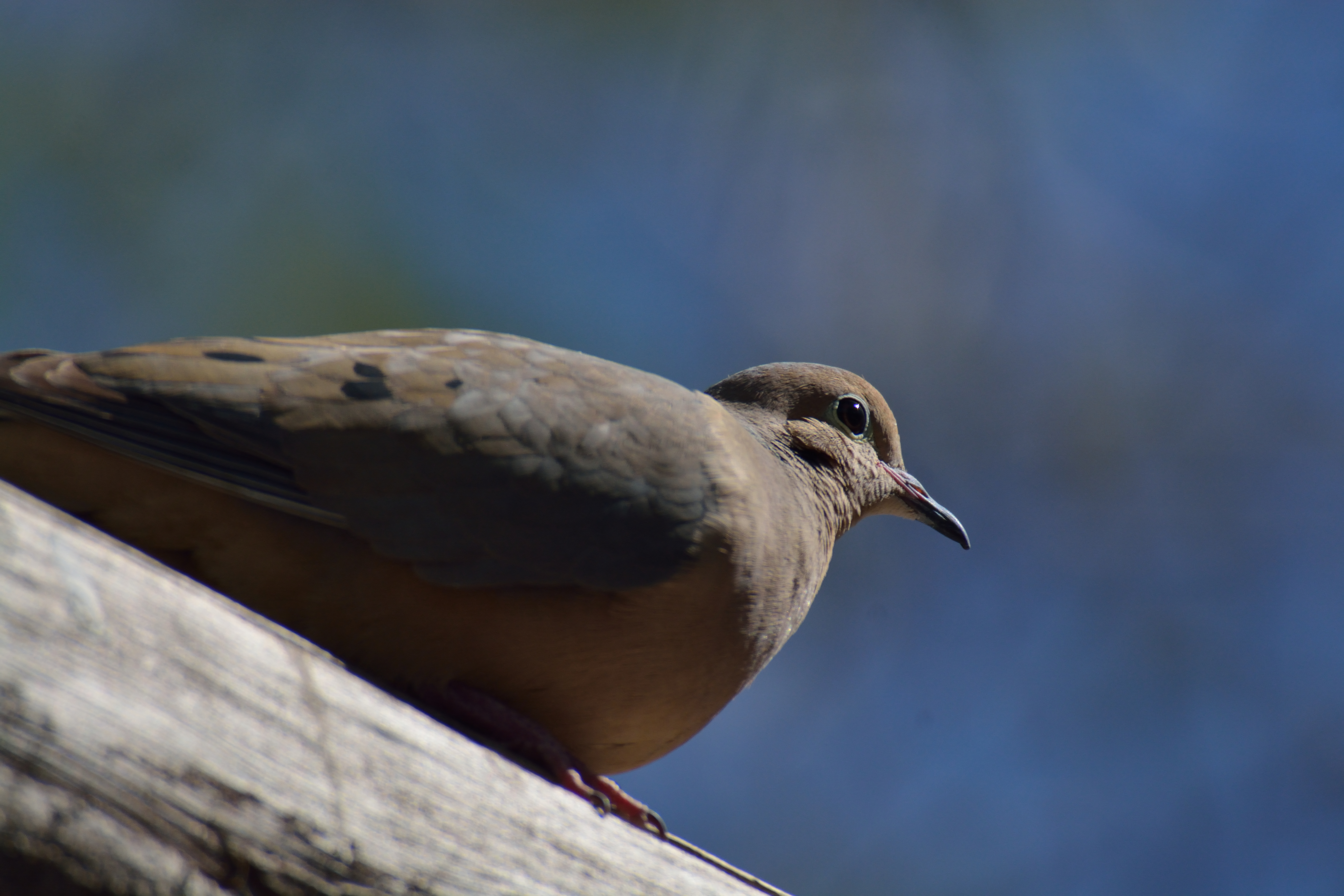
In Hermosillo, Sonora, Mexico

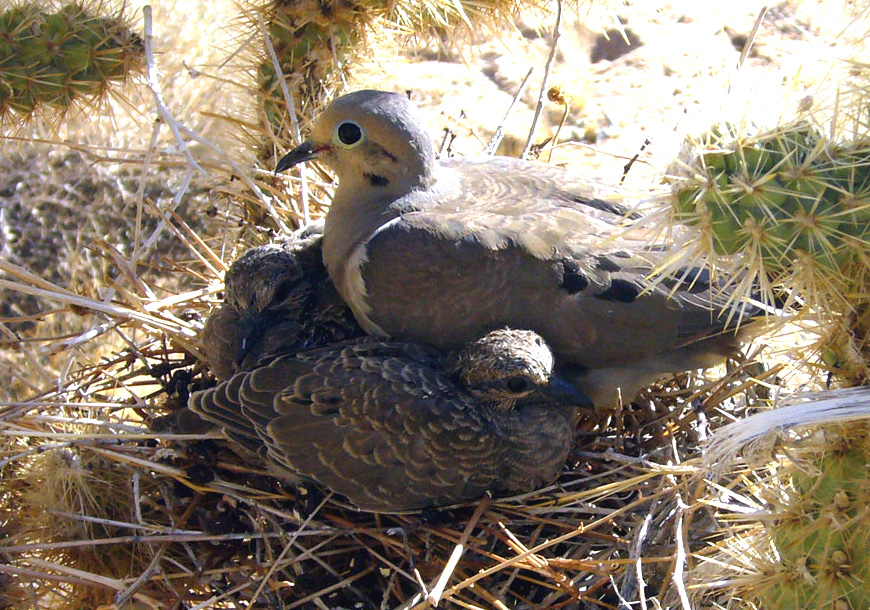
Adult and squabs in the cactus-protected nest, High Desert (California)

The mourning dove has a large range of nearly 11,000,000 km^{2} (4,200,000 sq mi). The species is resident throughout the Greater Antilles, most of Mexico, the Continental United States, southern Canada, and the Atlantic archipelago of Bermuda. Much of the Canadian prairie sees these birds in summer only, and southern Central America sees them in winter only. The species is a vagrant in northern Canada, Alaska, and South America. It has occurred as a vagrant at least nine times in the Western Palearctic with records from the British Isles (5), Sweden (2), the Azores (1), and Iceland (1). The mourning dove also appeared on Socorro Island, off the western coast of Mexico, in 1988, sixteen years after the Socorro dove was extirpated from that island.

The mourning dove occupies a wide variety of open and semi-open habitats, such as urban areas, farms, prairie, grassland, and lightly wooded areas. It avoids swamps and thick forest. As a generalist species, the mourning dove thrives in human-adapted landscapes, both rural and urban.

=== Migration ===
Most mourning doves migrate along flyways over land. Birds in Canada migrate the farthest, probably wintering in Mexico or further south. Those that spend the summer further south are more sedentary, with much shorter migrations. At the southern part of their range, Mourning Doves are present year-round.

Spring migration north runs from March to May. Fall migration south runs from September to November, with immatures moving first, followed by adult females and then by adult males. Migration is usually during the day, in flocks, and at low altitudes.

=== As an introduced species ===
The mourning dove was introduced to Hawaii in the mid-1960s after being released as game birds near Puʻu Waʻawaʻa on the Big Island.

== Behavior and ecology ==
Mourning doves sunbathe or rain bathe by lying on the ground or a flat tree limb, leaning over, stretching one wing, and keeping this posture for up to twenty minutes. These birds can also water bathe in shallow pools or birdbaths. Dustbathing is common as well.

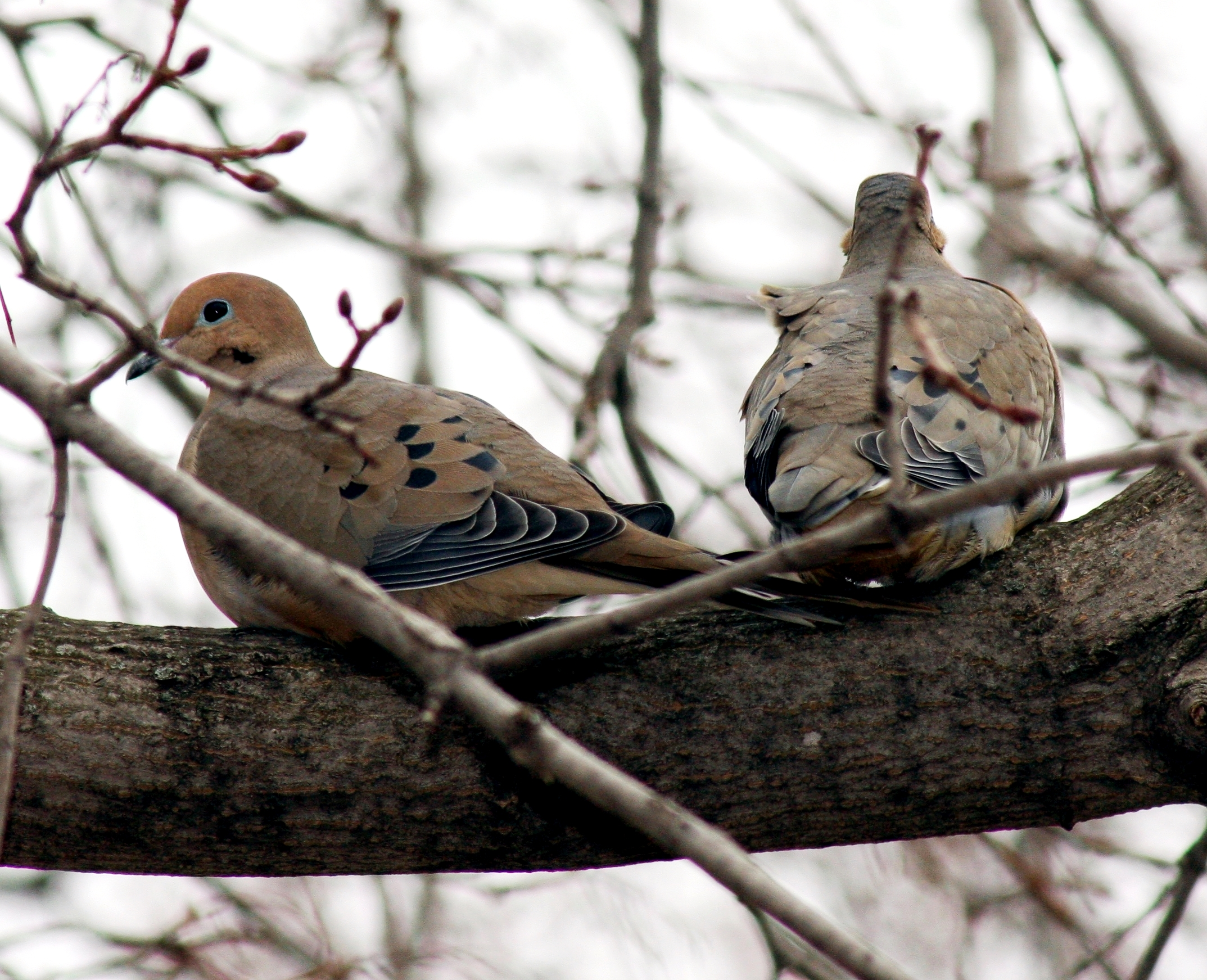
Pair of doves in late winter in Minnesota

Outside the breeding season, mourning doves roost communally in dense deciduous trees or conifers. During sleep, the head rests between the shoulders, close to the body; it is not tucked under the shoulder feathers as in many other species. During the winter in Canada, roosting flights to the roosts in the evening, and out of the roosts in the morning, are delayed on colder days.

=== Breeding ===
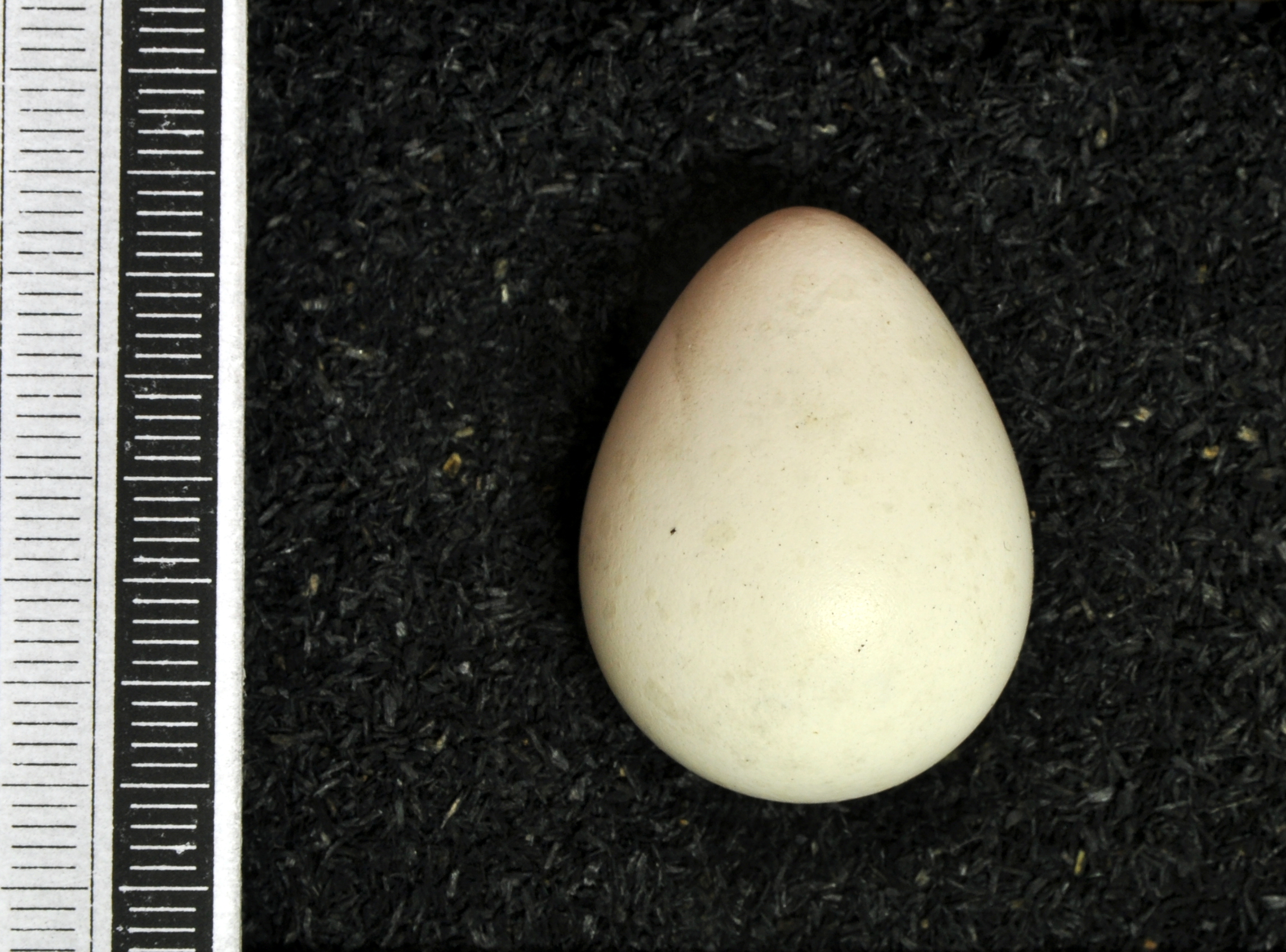
Mourning dove egg, Collection Museum Wiesbaden

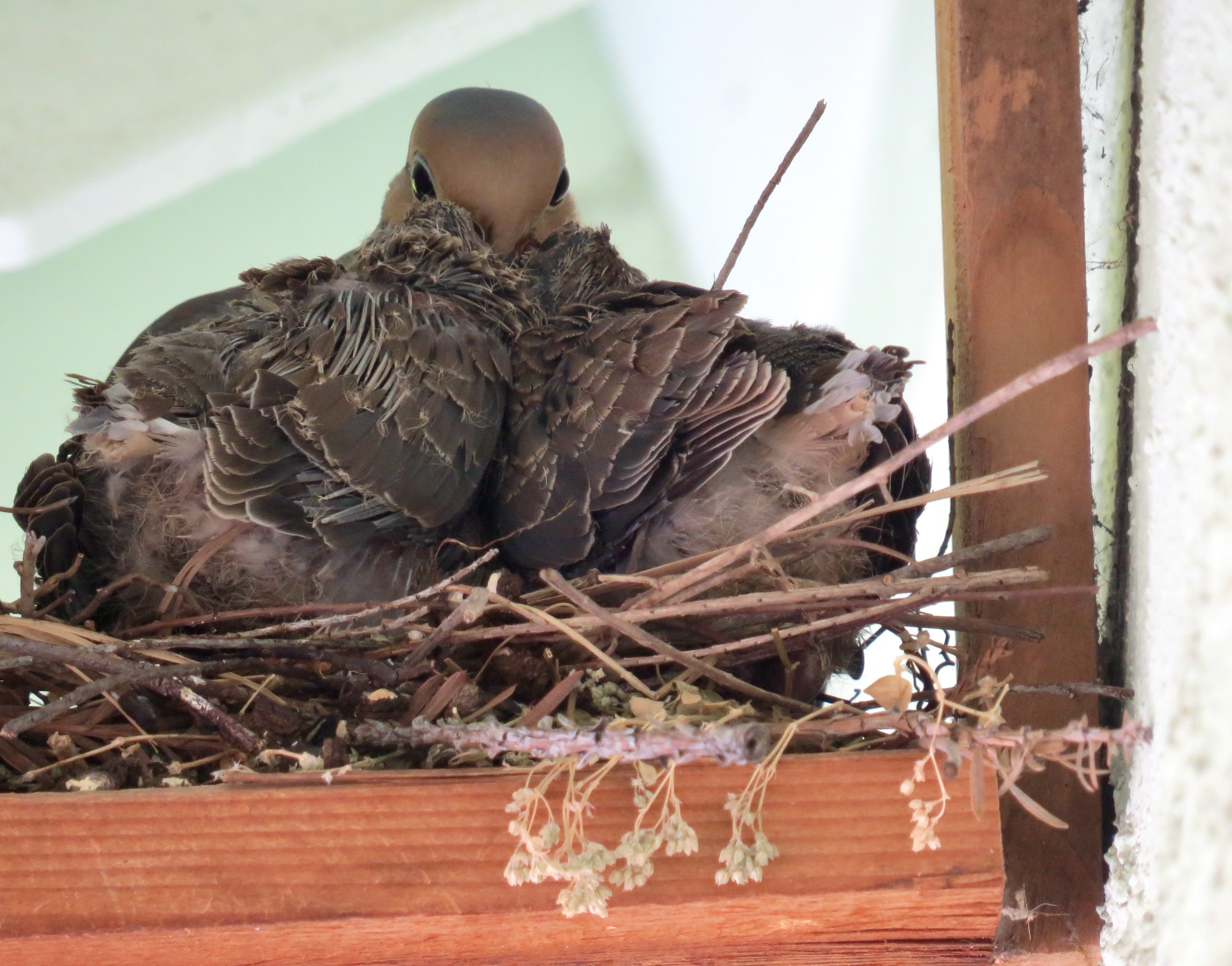
A mourning dove nest in a birdhouse in California

Courtship begins with a noisy flight by the male, followed by a graceful, circular glide with outstretched wings and head down. After landing, the male will approach the female with a puffed-out breast, bobbing head, and loud calls. Mated pairs will often preen each other's feathers.

The male then leads the female to potential nest sites, and the female will choose one. The female dove builds the nest. The male will fly about, gather material, and bring it to her. The male will stand on the female's back and give the material to the female, who then builds it into the nest. The nest is constructed of twigs, conifer needles, or grass blades, and is of flimsy construction. Mourning doves will sometimes requisition the unused nests of other mourning doves, other birds, or arboreal mammals such as squirrels.

Most nests are in trees, both deciduous and coniferous. Sometimes, they can be found in shrubs, vines, or on artificial constructs like buildings or hanging flower pots. When there is no suitable elevated object, mourning doves will nest on the ground.

The clutch size is almost always two eggs. Occasionally, a female will lay her eggs in the nest of another pair, leading to three or four eggs in the nest. The eggs are white, 6.6 ml (0.23 imp fl oz; 0.22 US fl oz), 2.57–2.96 cm (1.01–1.17 in) long, 2.06–2.30 cm (0.81–0.91 in) wide, 6–7 g (0.21–0.25 oz) at laying (5–6% of female body mass). Both sexes incubate, the male from morning to afternoon, and the female the rest of the day and at night. Mourning doves are devoted parents; nests are rarely left unattended by the adults.

Hatching and growth

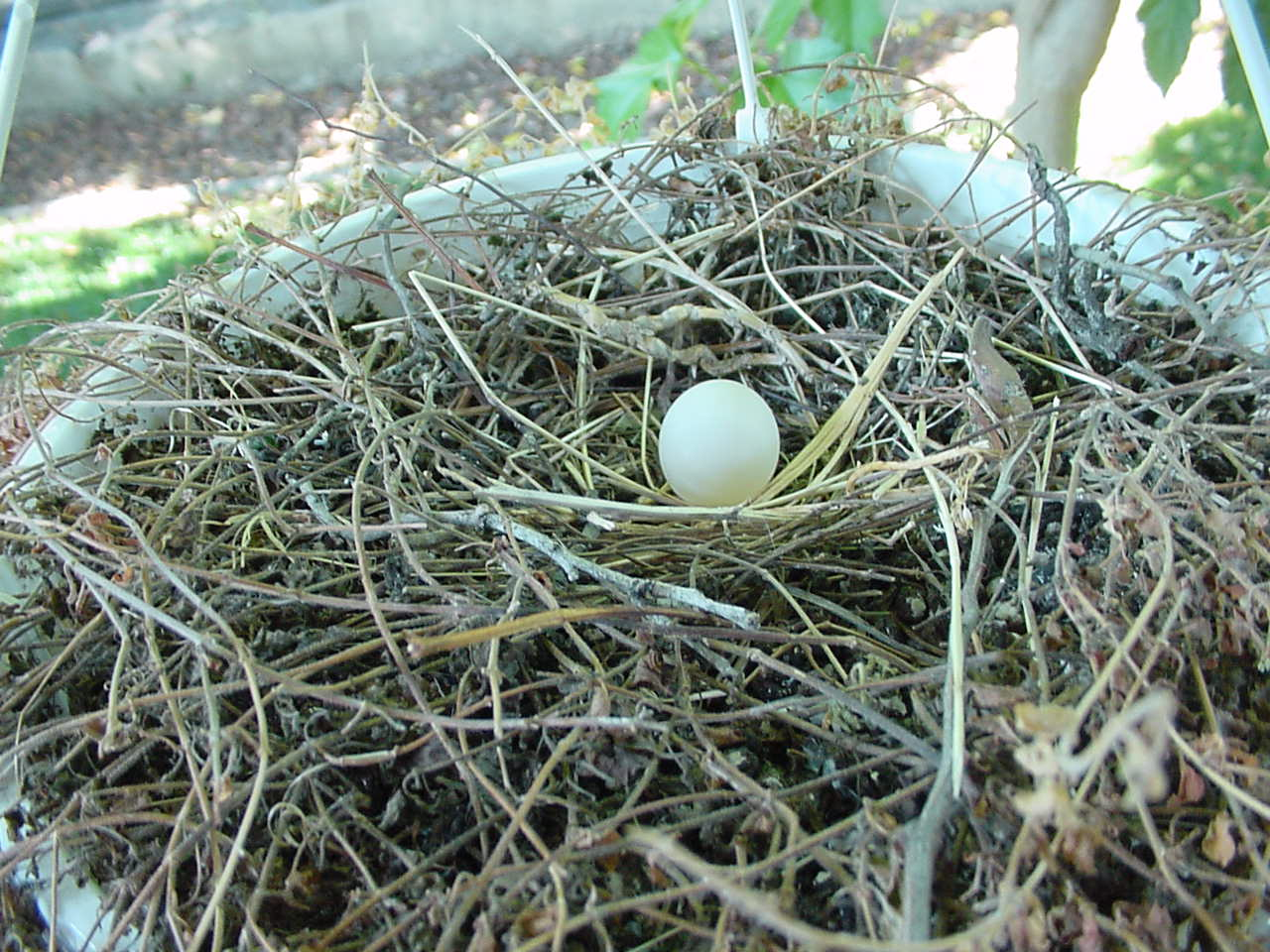
Egg in nest

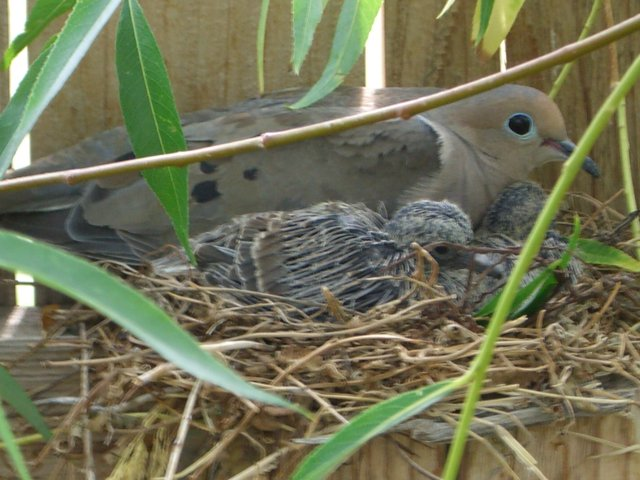
Nesting in progress

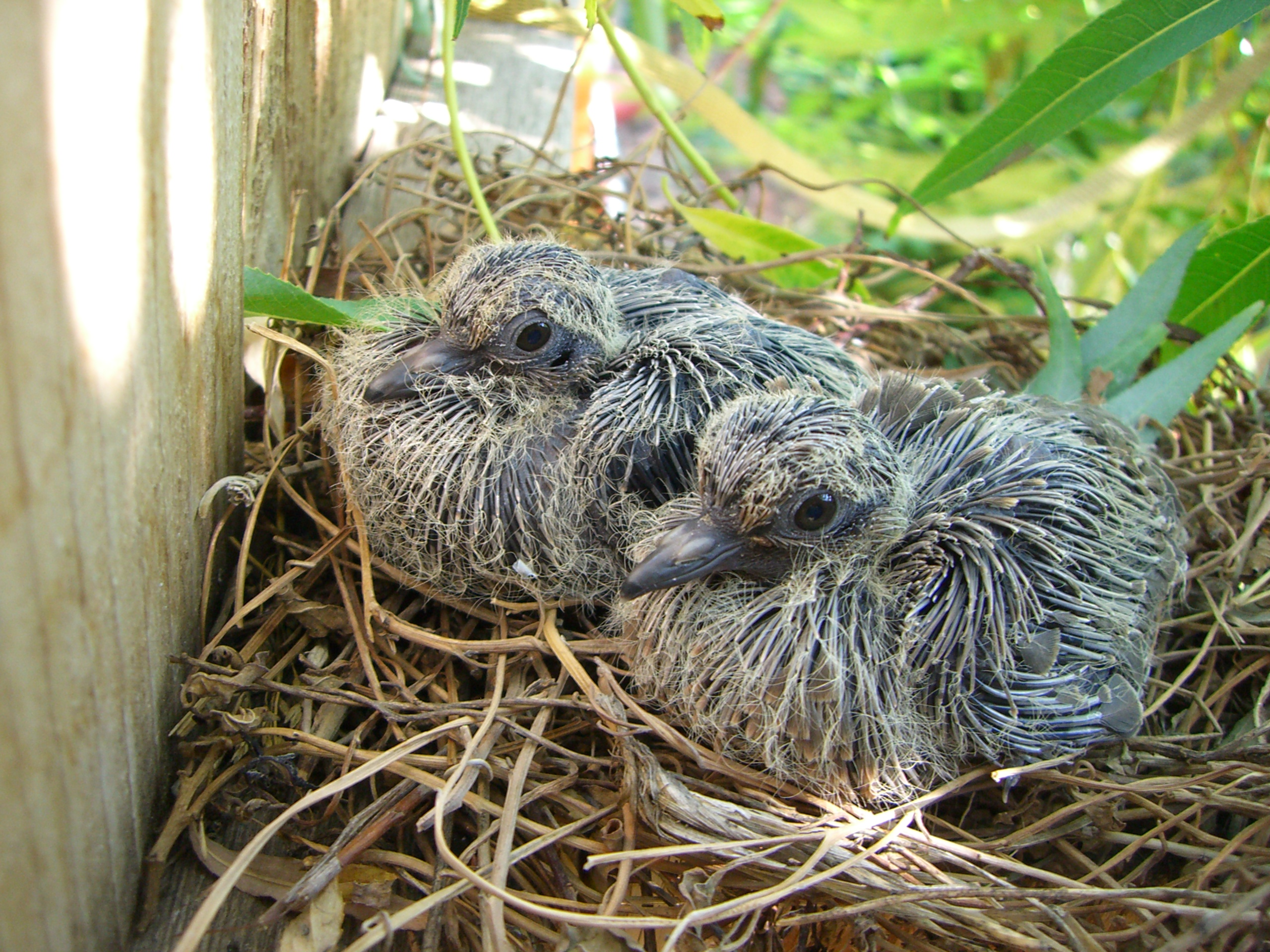
Squabs

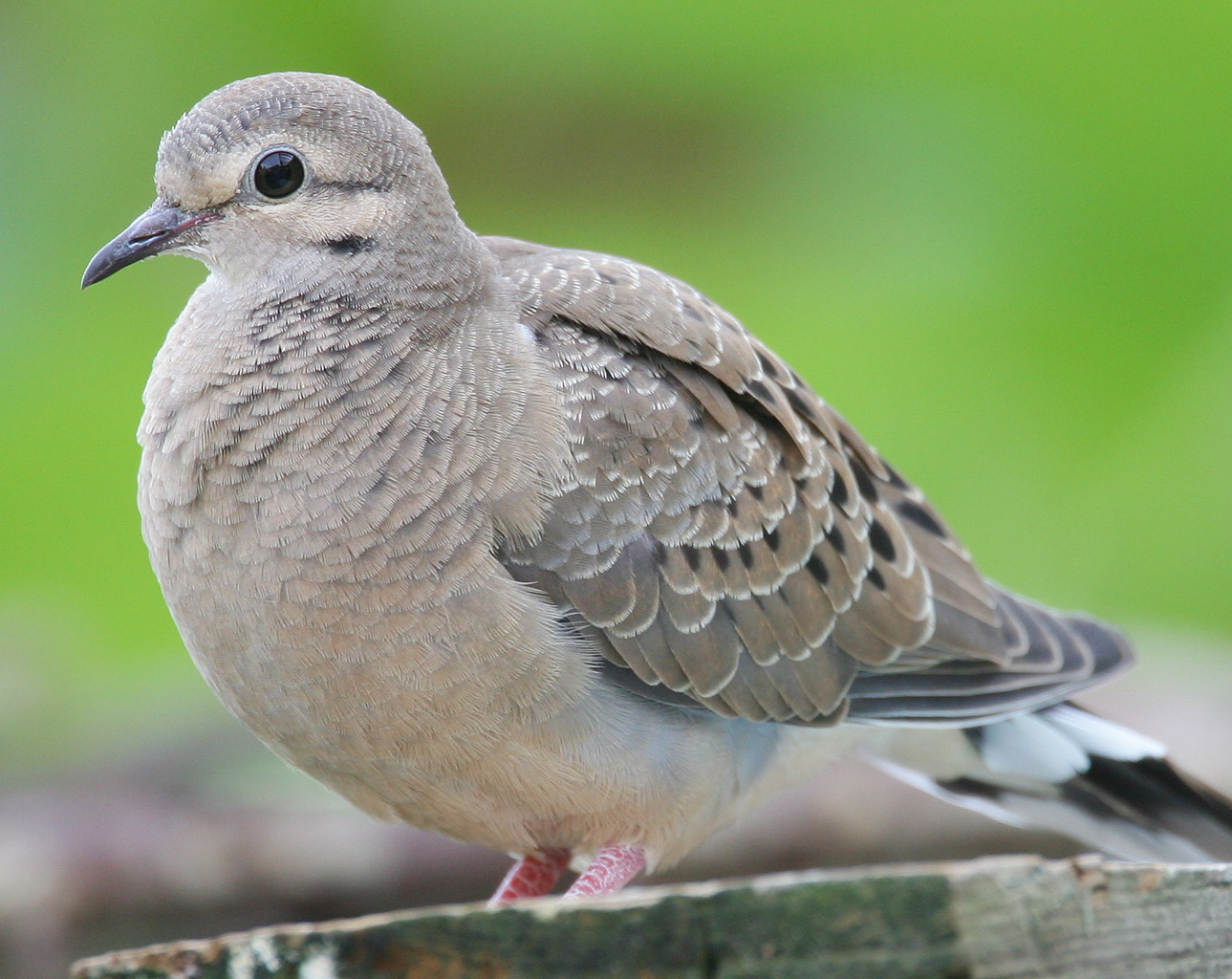
A juvenile

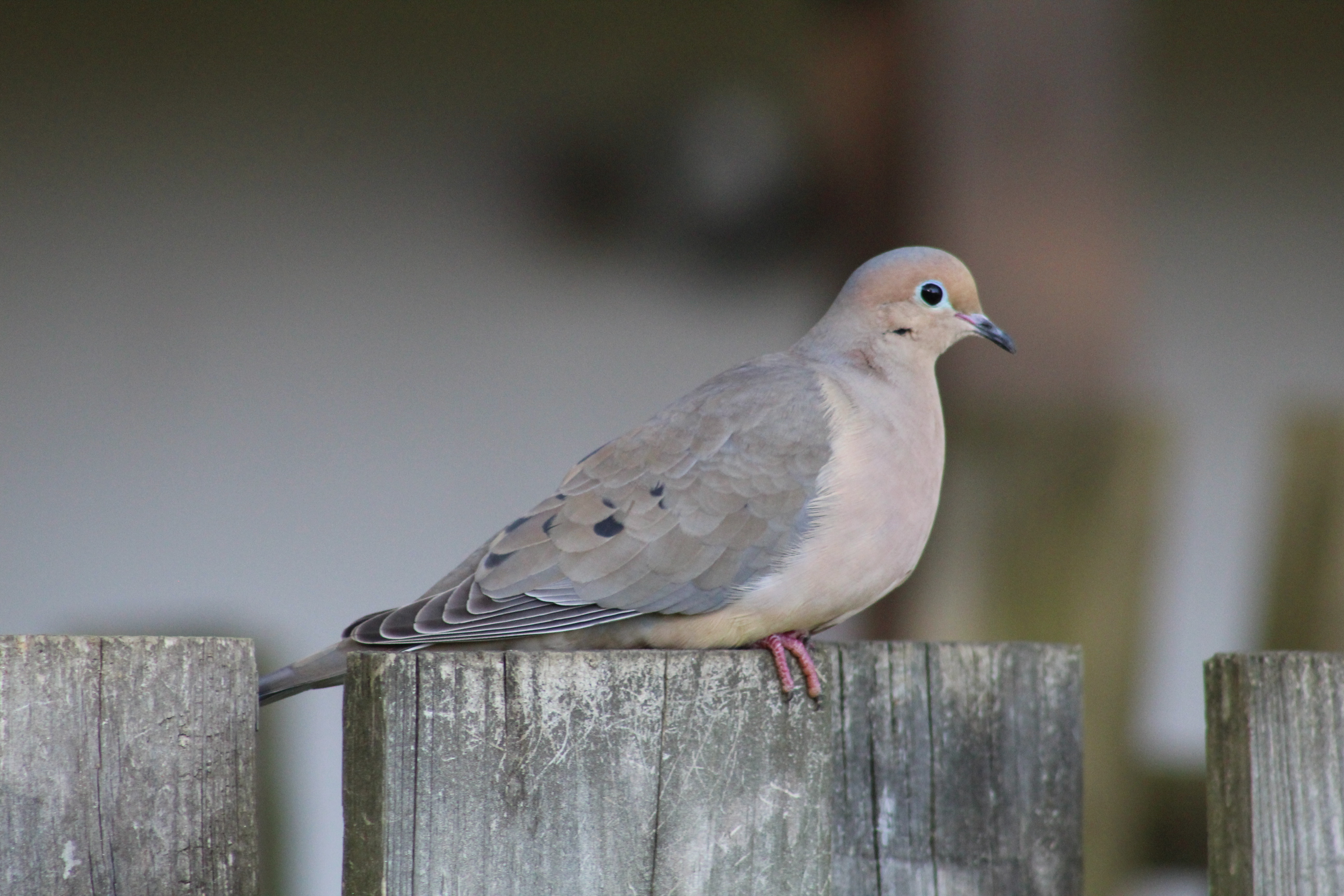
Adult

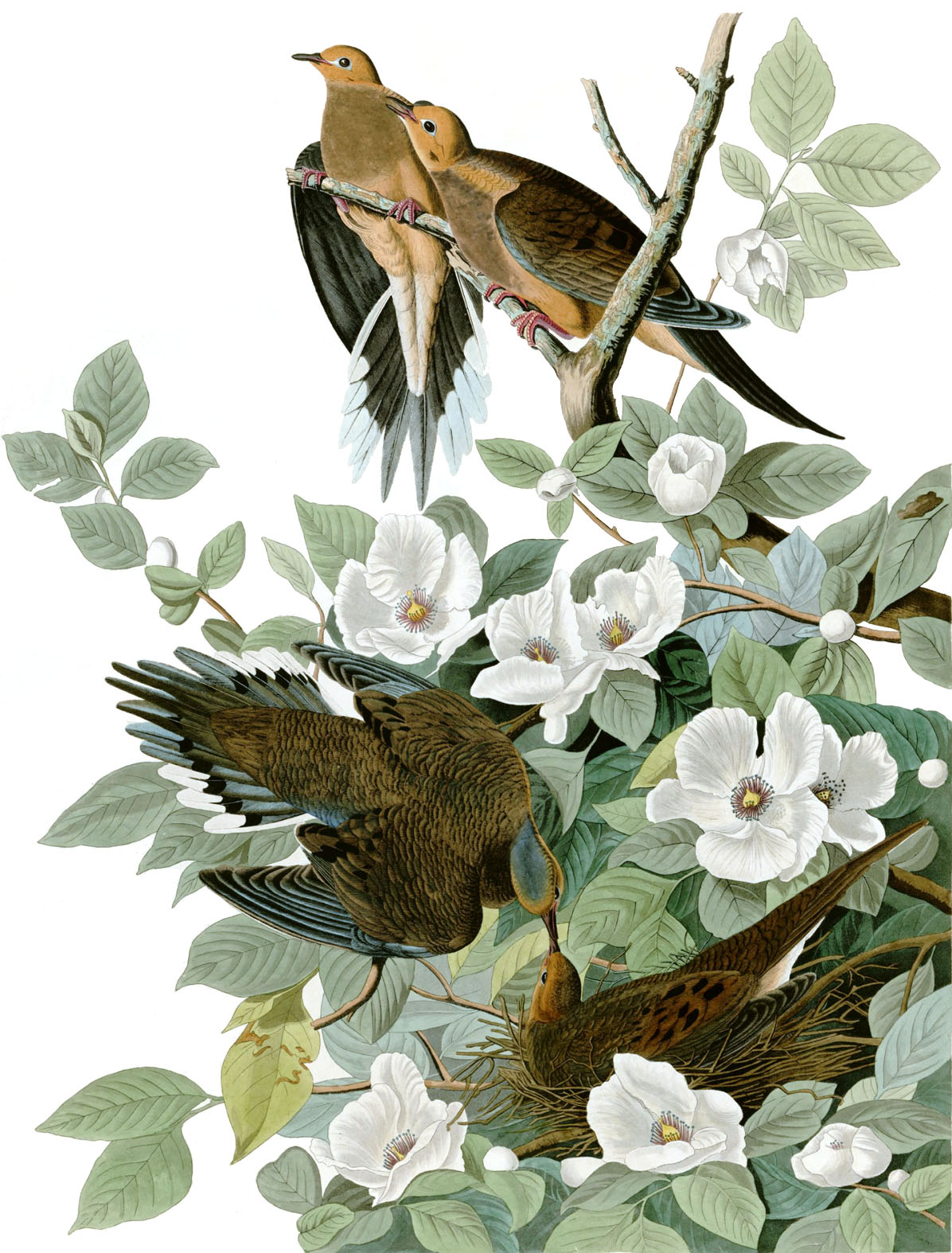
Illustration by John James Audubon

Incubation takes two weeks. The hatched young, called squabs, are strongly altricial, being helpless at hatching and covered with down. Both parents feed the squabs crop milk for the first 3–4 days of life. Thereafter, the crop milk is gradually augmented by seeds. Fledging takes place in about 11–15 days, before the squabs are fully grown but after they are capable of digesting adult food. They stay nearby to be fed by their father for up to two weeks after fledging.

Mourning doves are prolific breeders. In warmer areas, the birds may raise up to six broods in a season. This fast breeding is essential because mortality is high. Each year, mortality can reach 58% a year for adults and 69% for the young.

The mourning dove is generally monogamous and forms strong pair bonds.

Hybridization with other pigeon and dove species is rare, though genetic research has found evidence of gene flow with introduced feral pigeons and Eurasian collared doves as well as the native white-winged dove. Though gene flow between these species appears to be minimal, anecdotal reports of hybrid birds suggest interspecific pairings occur both in captivity as well as in the wild. Hybridization with the Eurasian collared dove has been recorded across North America since the species first became established in the 1980s, and it is possible that interbreeding white-winged doves could become more frequent as the species expands into areas within the mourning dove's range. It is unclear how hybridization with other species could impact the status of the mourning dove long-term.

=== Feeding ===
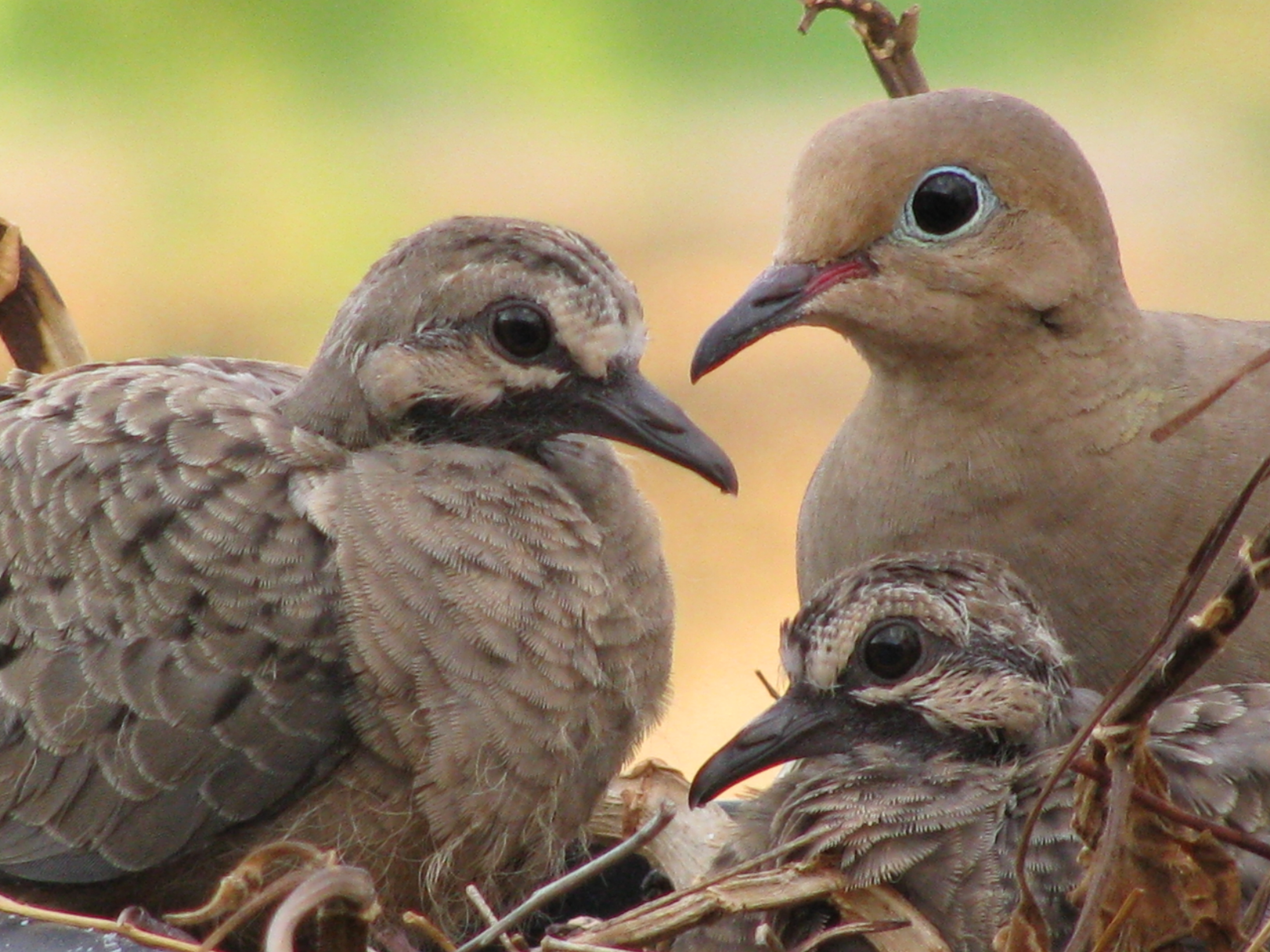
Parent and two chicks in Arizona

Mourning doves eat almost exclusively seeds, which make up more than 99% of their diet. Rarely, they will eat snails or insects. Mourning doves generally eat enough to fill their crops and then fly away to digest while resting. They often swallow grit such as fine gravel or sand to assist with digestion. The species usually forages on the ground, walking but not hopping. At bird feeders, mourning doves are attracted to one of the largest ranges of seed types of any North American bird, with a preference for rapeseed, corn, millet, safflower, and sunflower seeds. Mourning doves do not dig or scratch for seeds, though they will push aside ground litter; instead, they eat what is readily visible. They will sometimes perch on plants and eat from there.

Mourning doves show a preference for the seeds of certain species of plant over others. Foods taken in preference to others include pine nuts, sweetgum seeds, and the seeds of pokeberry, amaranth, canary grass, corn, sesame, and wheat. When their favorite foods are absent, mourning doves will eat the seeds of other plants, including buckwheat, rye, goosegrass and smartweed.

=== Predators and parasites ===
The primary predators of this species are diurnal birds of prey, such as falcons and hawks. During nesting, corvids, grackles, housecats, or rat snakes will prey on their eggs. Cowbirds rarely parasitize mourning dove nests. Mourning doves reject slightly under a third of cowbird eggs in such nests, and the mourning dove's vegetarian diet is unsuitable for cowbirds.

Mourning doves can be afflicted with several different diseases and parasites, including tapeworms, nematodes, mites, and lice. The mouth-dwelling parasite Trichomonas gallinae is particularly severe. While a mourning dove will sometimes host it without symptoms, T. gallinae often causes yellowish growth in the mouth and esophagus that eventually starves the host to death. Avian pox is a common, insect-vectored disease.

== Conservation status ==
The number of individual mourning doves was estimated to be approximately 475 million in 1994, More recent reports indicate that there were approximately 337 million doves in the US as of September 2024. The mourning dove is considered to be of least concern due to its large population and range, meaning that the species is not at immediate risk. As a gamebird, the mourning dove is well-managed, with more than 20 million (and up to 40–70 million) shot by hunters each year. However, reporting cautions that mourning doves are in decline in the western United States.

== Cited texts ==
- "Mourning Dove (Zenaida macroura)" (PDF). Fish and Wildlife Habitat Management leaflet 31. National Resources Conservation Services (NRCS). February 2006. p. 2. Archived from the original (PDF) on 2006-09-23.
