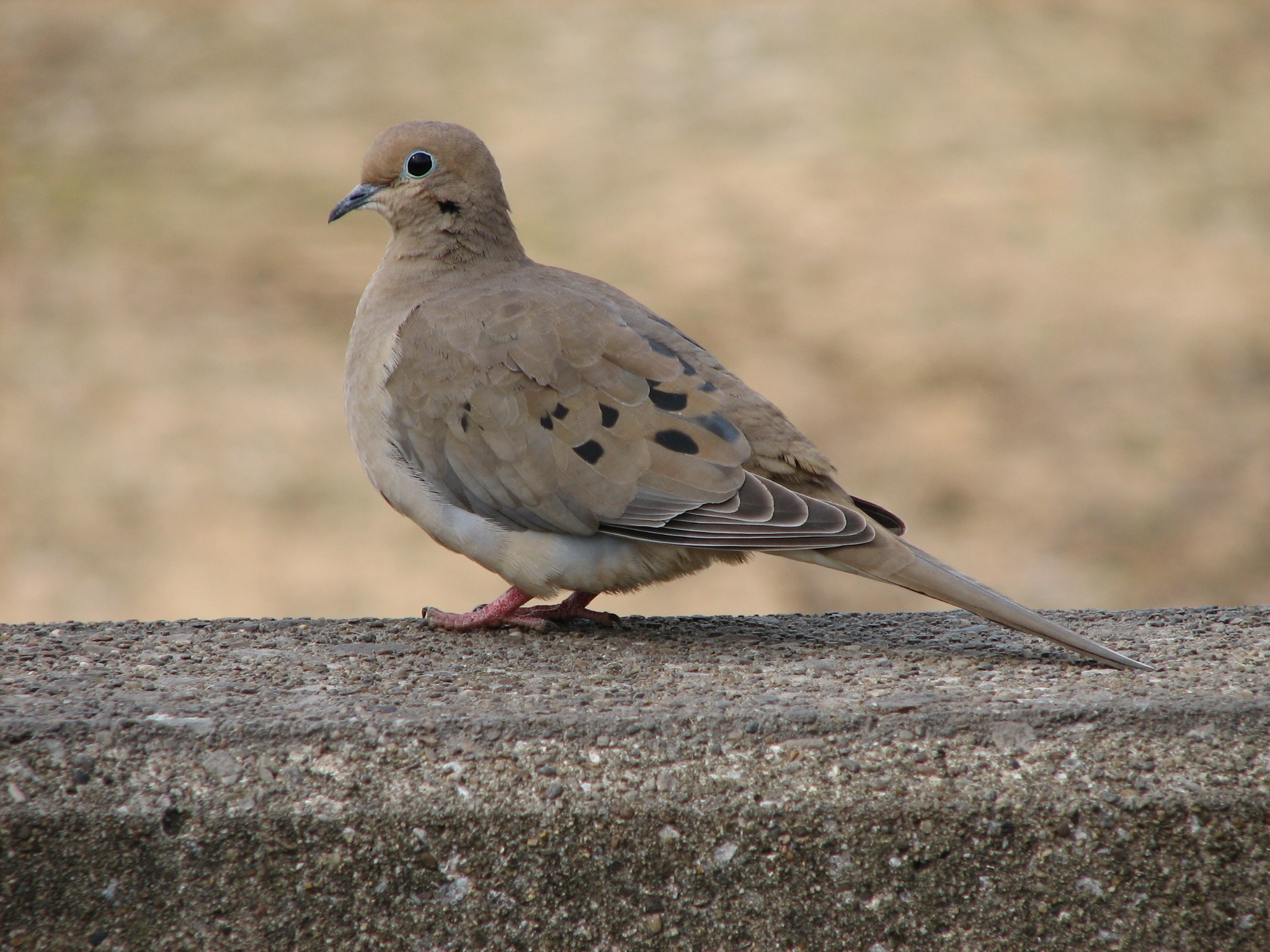
- Mourning dove (Zenaida macroura)

Scientific classification
- Kingdom: Animalia
- Phylum: Chordata
- Class: Aves
- Order: Columbiformes
- Family: Columbidae
- Subfamily: Columbinae
- Tribe: Zenaidini
- Genus: Zenaida; Bonaparte, 1838

Type species
- Zenaida amabilis Bonaparte, 1838

Species
- See text

Synonyms
- Melopelia; Zenaidura

Audio
- Call of a mourning dove

= Zenaida (genus) =

Genus of birds

Zenaida is a small genus of American doves in the family Columbidae. It contains seven extant species including Zenaida aurita, which is known as the Zenaida dove.

== Taxonomy ==
The genus was introduced in 1838 by French naturalist Charles Lucien Bonaparte. The name commemorates his wife, Zénaïde Laetitia Julie Bonaparte, niece of Napoleon Bonaparte. The type species is the Zenaida dove, Zenaida aurita. It is the national bird of Anguilla.

DNA sequence analysis confirms that the white-winged and West Peruvian doves are the most distinct and that they should be treated as distinct species. Relationships among the other species are quite unequivocal, too; what is not quite clear is whether the Galapagos dove is most closely related to the Zenaida dove (as tentatively indicated by morphology) or to the eared and mourning doves (as suggested by DNA sequences — although with a very low confidence level – and, most robustly, biogeography).

- Zenaidini
  - Geotrygon – 9 species
  - - - Leptotila – 11 species
      - Leptotrygon – olive-backed quail-dove
    - - Zenaida – 7 species
      - Zentrygon – 8 species

Cladogram showing the position of genera in the tribe Zenaidini.

- Zenaida
  - - White-winged dove (Z. asiatica)
    - West Peruvian dove (Z. meloda)
  - - Zenaida dove (Z. aurita)
    - - Eared dove (Z. auriculata)
      - - Socorro dove (Z. graysoni)
        - Mourning dove (Z. macroura)

Cladogram showing the relationships of six species of doves in the genus Zenaida. This study did not include the Galápagos dove (Z. galapagoensis).

=== Extant species ===
The genus contains seven species:

| Image | Scientific name | Common name | Distribution |
|---|---|---|---|
| | Zenaida meloda | West Peruvian dove | from southern Ecuador to northern Chile |
| | Zenaida asiatica | White-winged dove | Southwestern United States through Mexico, Central America, and the Caribbean |
| | Zenaida graysoni | Socorro dove | Socorro Island in the Revillagigedo Islands; extinct in the wild |
| | Zenaida macroura | Mourning dove | Most of Canada and USA to south central Mexico, Bermuda, the Bahamas, the Greater Antilles, and Panama |
| | Zenaida aurita | Zenaida dove | Caribbean and the tip of the Yucatán Peninsula |
| | Zenaida galapagoensis | Galápagos dove | Galápagos, off Ecuador |
| | Zenaida auriculata | Eared dove | South America from Colombia to southern Argentina and Chile, and on the offshore islands from the Grenadines southwards |

== See also ==
- Passenger pigeon, a similar-looking extinct species
