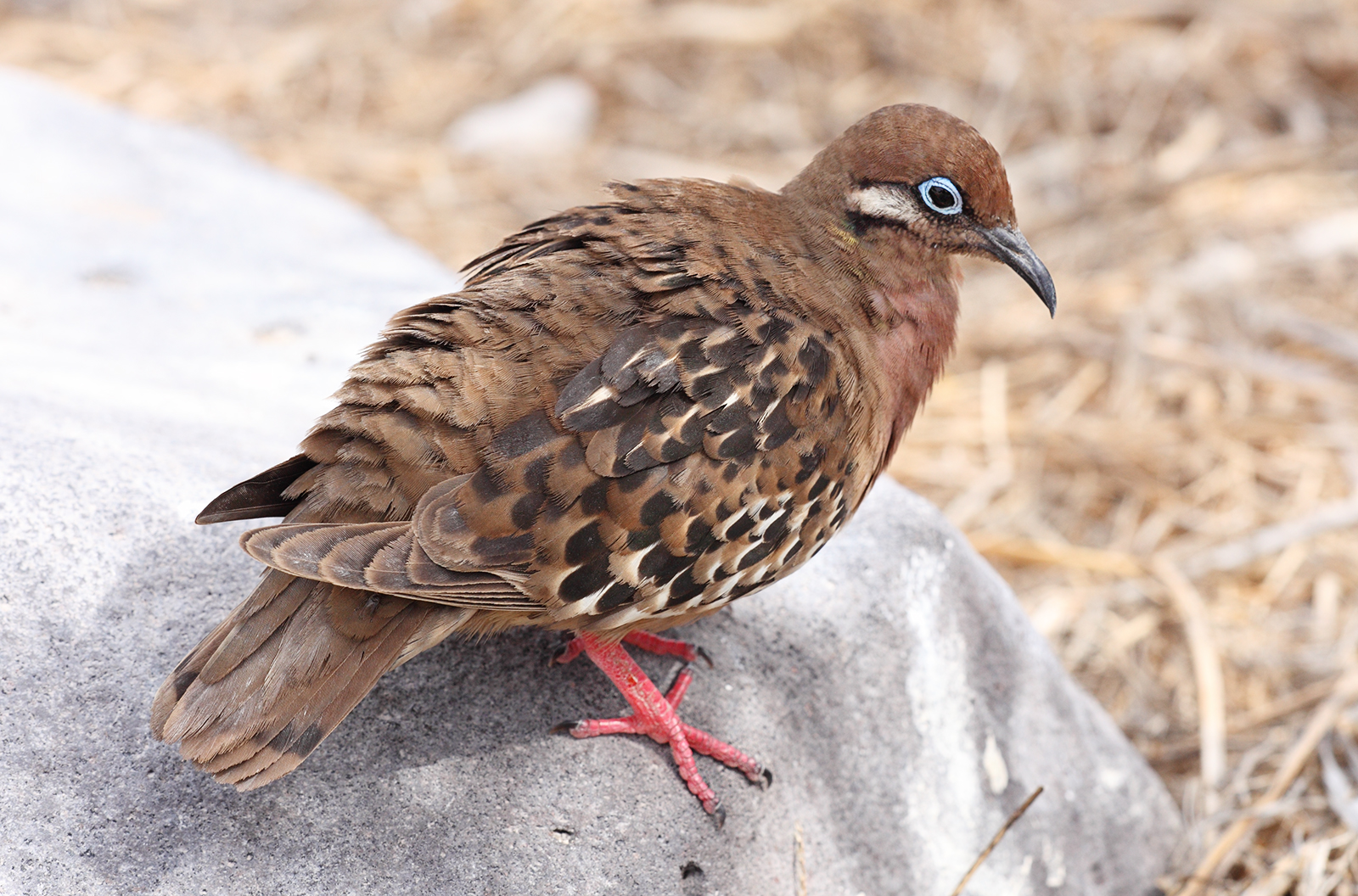
- Española, Galápagos

Conservation status
- Near Threatened (IUCN 3.1)

Scientific classification
- Kingdom: Animalia
- Phylum: Chordata
- Class: Aves
- Order: Columbiformes
- Family: Columbidae
- Genus: Zenaida
- Species: Z. galapagoensis

Binomial name
- Zenaida galapagoensis Gould, 1841

= Galápagos dove =

Species of bird

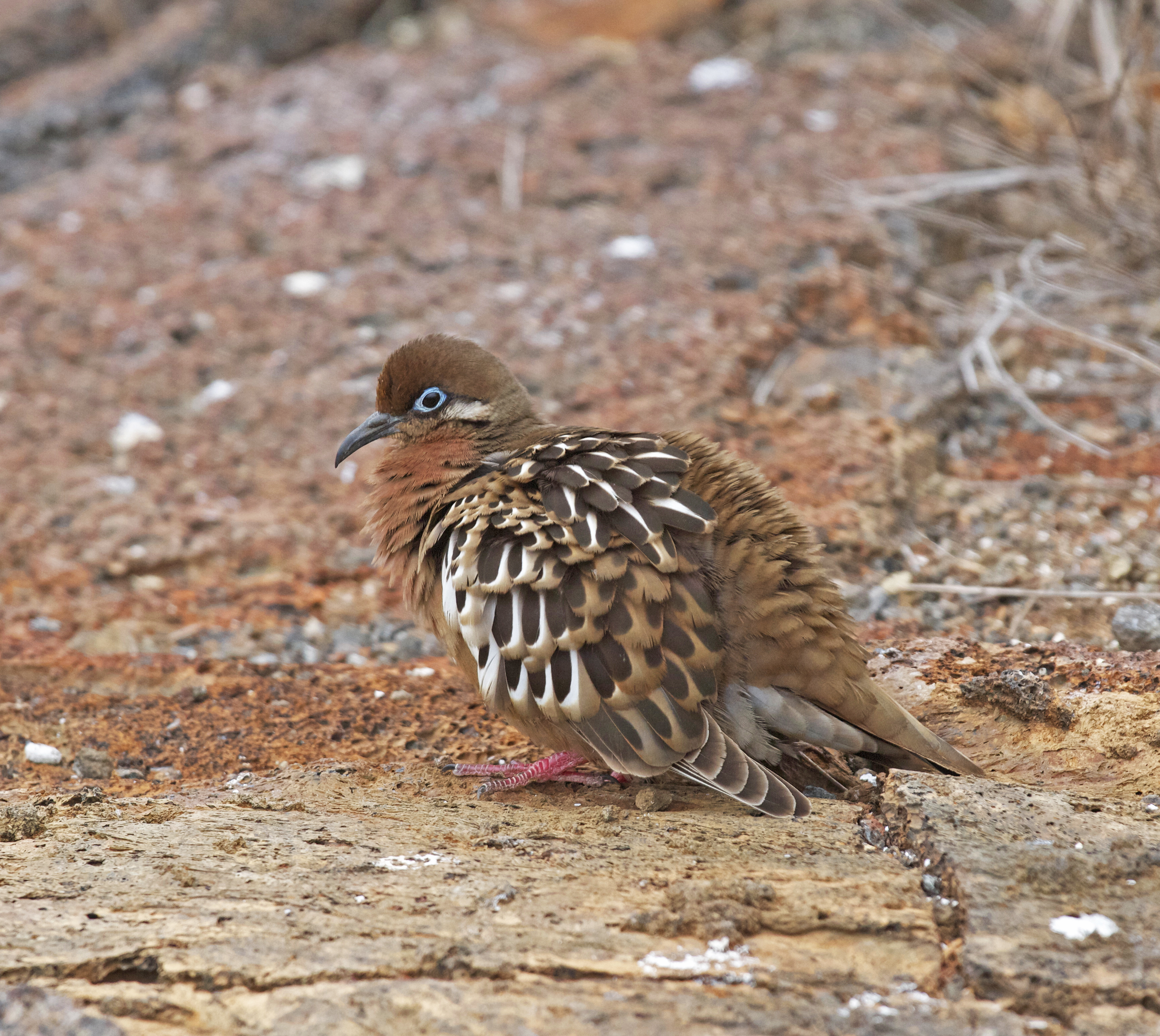
Galapagos dove on Genovesa Island

The Galápagos dove (Zenaida galapagoensis) is a species of bird in the family Columbidae. It is endemic to the Galápagos Islands. It is fairly common and is found in a wide range of open and semi-open habitats, especially in the arid lowlands of the archipelago.

== Taxonomy and systematics ==
Two subspecies exist:

- Zenaida galapagoensis galapagoensis (Gould, 1839) – the nominate subspecies. Found on the major islands of the Galapagos, with the exception of Darwin Island and Wolf Island.
- Zenaida galapagoensis exsul (Rothschild & Hartert, 1899) – Slightly larger and darker than Z. g. galapagoensis. Found only on Darwin Island and Wolf Island.

Despite the geographic isolation of the bird on different islands, there is significant gene flow between the different island populations, owing to frequent migration between islands. This has not entirely prevented the formation of subspecies however, as environmental factors such as wind currents, distance between islands, and even ocean currents affect where birds travel. Yet their impressive flight ability has ensured that the species remains fairly homogenous across the islands, unlike the Galapagos hawk (which has significant variations in size by island), or the intense speciation found in the less mobile Darwin's finches. It is also possible that the dove's omnivorous diet has prevented greater specialization. The presence of humans may be prompting population genetic changes to the populations on San Cristóbal Island and Santa Cruz Island, which has led to decreased allelic diversity.

== Description ==
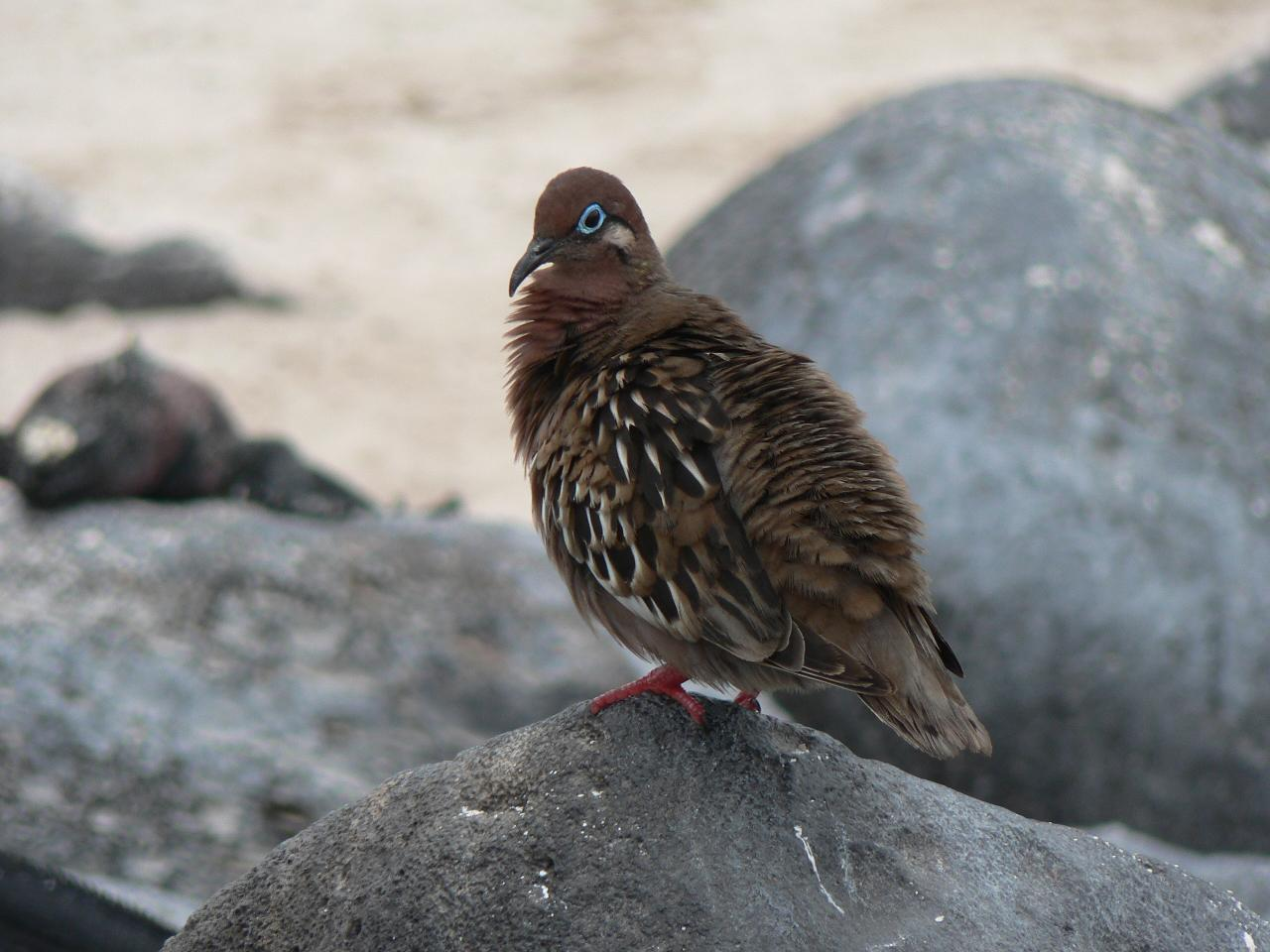
Galapagos dove on Española Island

The Galápagos dove grows 18–23 cm (7.1–9.1 in) long and weighs in at 67–92 g (2.4–3.2 oz). The long black bill is slightly curved downwards. The feet and legs are reddish with some purple. A boldly marked bird, the Galápagos dove has dark reddish-brown upperparts, a pinkish neck and breast, a buff-coloured belly, and brown wings, streaked with white and black. The skin around the eye is deep blue with a black border. The eye itself is brown. An iridescent patch is found on the side of the neck. The scapular feathers and the wing-coverts are black with a white stripe in the middle running down the length; this makes the wings appear streaked. The underparts of the wings are grey to blue. The central tail feathers are brown and the outers are grey.

Females are quite similar to the males, but are smaller – as is the size of their iridescent patch. They also have darker back, wings, and tail.

== Distribution and habitat ==
They inhabit rocky lowlands, scattered trees, bushes, and cacti.

== Behavior and ecology ==
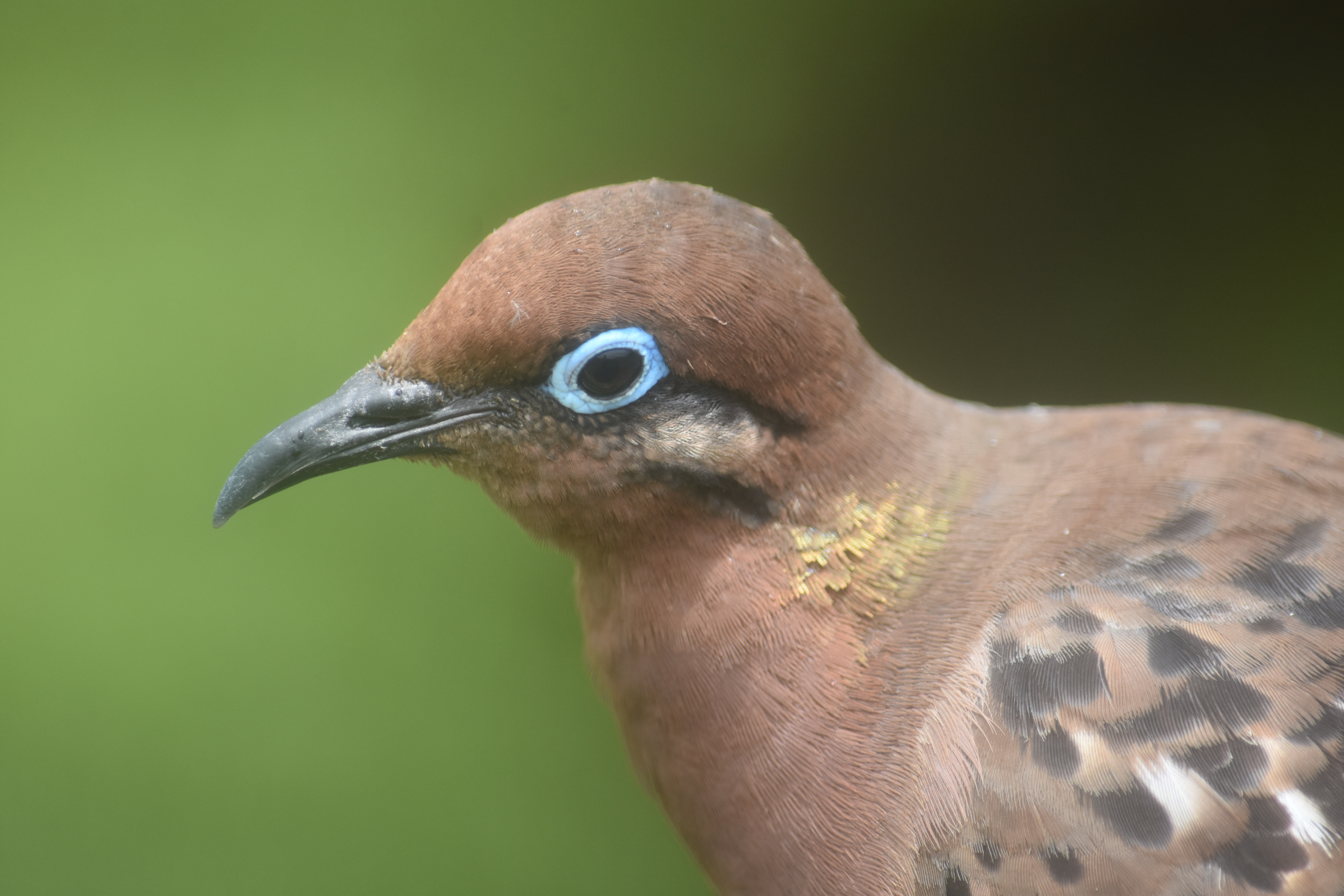
Close-up of Galápagos dove on Santa Cruz Island

=== Breeding and nesting ===
When their nests are in danger, the doves will pretend to be hurt or injured and lure the predator away from its nest. Most Galápagos dove nest are built on the ground, often under lava overhangs, or in old mockingbird nests in the cacti. A typical clutch consists of two eggs. Breeding begins three to five weeks after the beginning of the wet season, with up to three clutches a year.

=== Feeding ===
The long downward curved beaks on the Galápagos dove helps it feed mostly on seeds and fruits from the ground. Very reluctant to fly, it will only do so as a last resort. Galápagos doves spend most of their time on the ground searching for food, mainly feeding off seeds, caterpillars, and Opuntia cactus flowers and pulp.

On islands where bees are absent, the Opuntia cacti have evolved softer spines. This may allow birds, including the dove, better access to the flowers, with bird activity serving to pollinate the flowers.

The doves mostly crush seeds before eating them, but ingest some seeds whole, some of which survive digestion – making the bird a source of plant distribution in the Galapagos.

=== Survival ===
As an island endemic species, Galapagos doves are at high risk from introduced diseases and predators. Introduced diseases include Trichomonas gallinae (perhaps spread from rock doves or eared doves from the mainland), and Haemoproteus malaria (which was found in more than 85% of birds on Española Island). Chlamydia psittaci is also a threat. Introduced diseases may also spread from the Galapagos dove to other species in the archipelago ecosystem, such as lice which can spread to Galapagos hawks when the doves are preyed upon. The lice then serve as disease vectors.

== Relationship with humans ==
Galápagos doves present an example of how a species adapts when mankind interacts with the species and its environment. The 1685 Galapagos Island expedition by the British privateers is where the first interaction of Galápagos doves and humans took place. The Galápagos dove, like many animals in Galápagos, is extremely tame. When the British sailors first arrived, these doves showed no fear, coming in flocks, which made them easy hunting targets. The doves would even sit on the heads and shoulders of the sailors. However, the birds eventually adapted by learning to avoid human interaction.

== Status ==
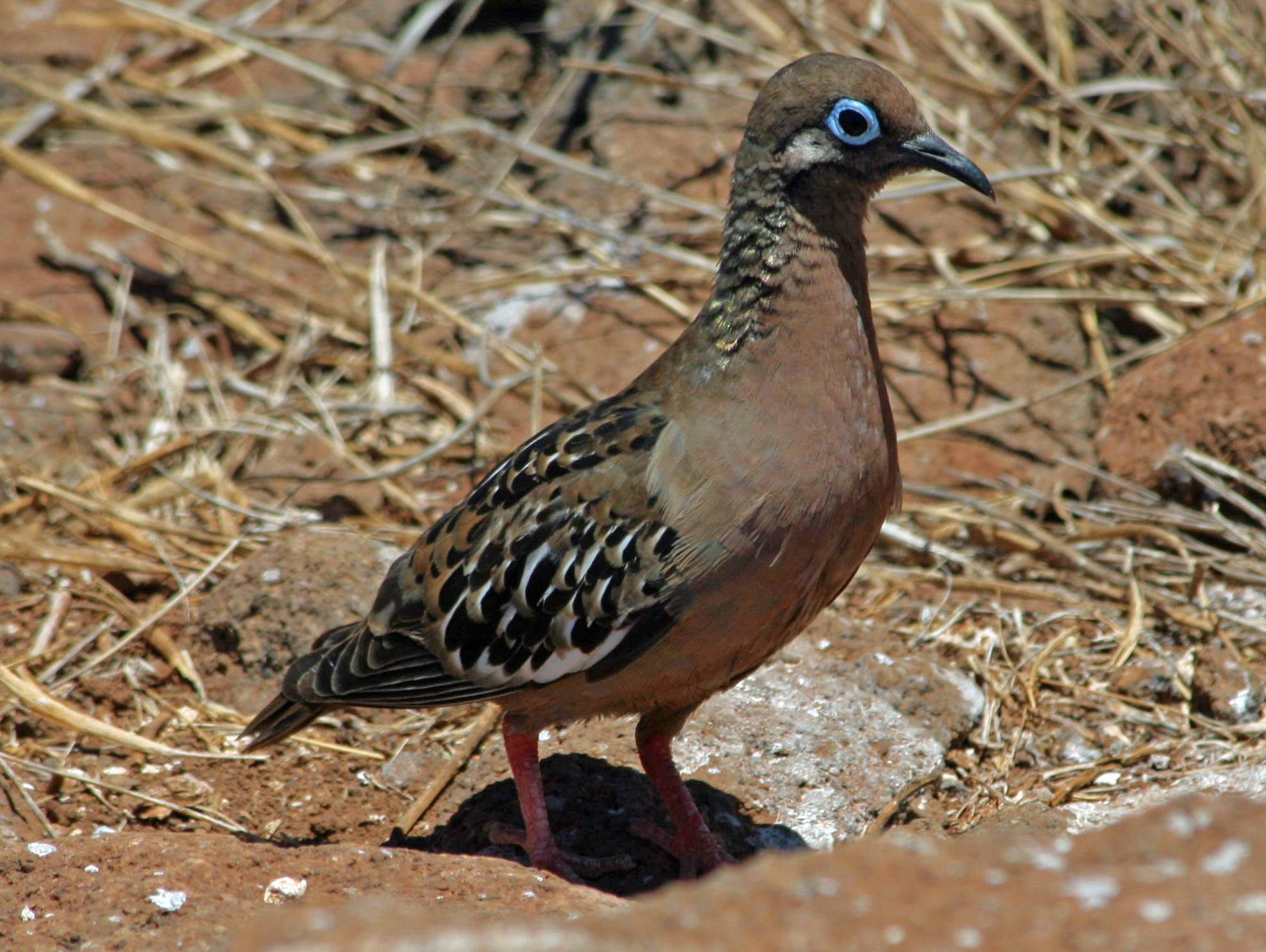

In the mid to late 1600s, Galápagos doves began to be hunted by sailors. Extensive human depredations continued at least into the 1960s, but the doves are now most threatened by feral cats. Other threats are diseases, pollution, and habitat degradation.
