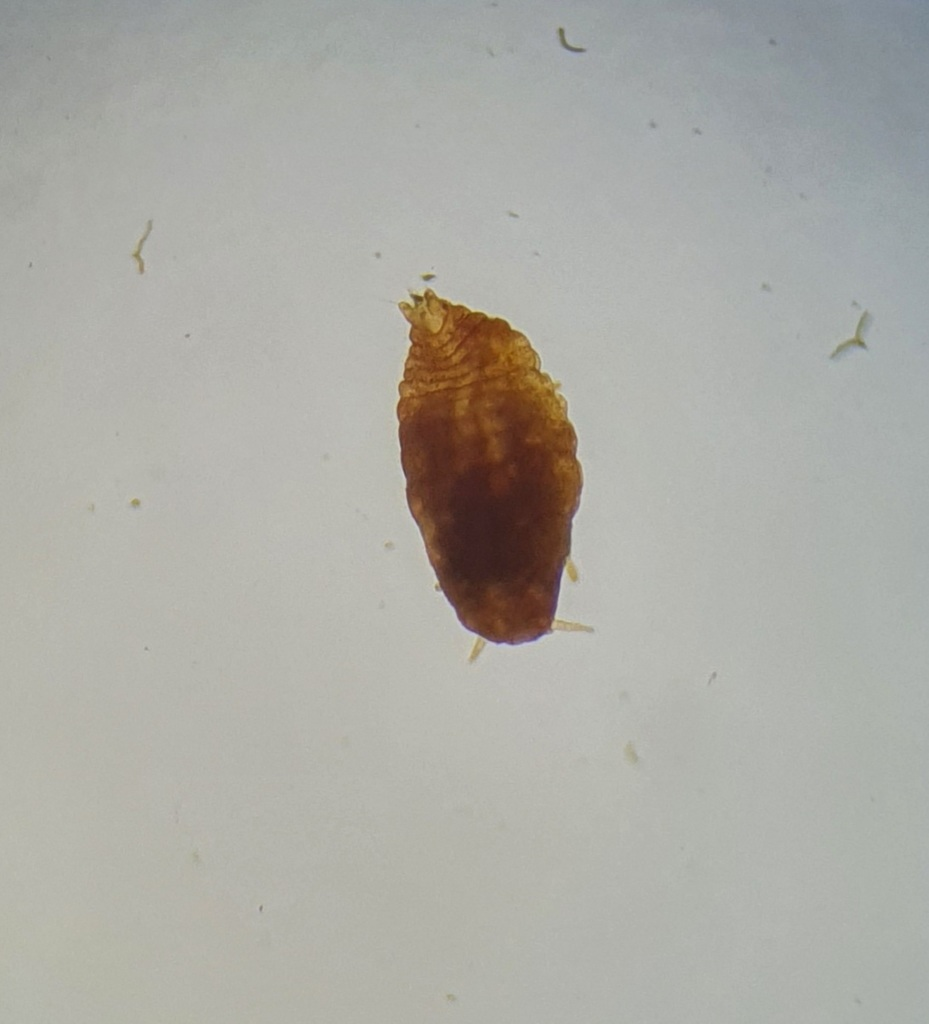
- Eriococcus orariensis nymph

Scientific classification
- Kingdom: Animalia
- Phylum: Arthropoda
- Class: Insecta
- Order: Hemiptera
- Suborder: Sternorrhyncha
- Family: Eriococcidae
- Genus: Eriococcus
- Species: E. orariensis

Binomial name
- Eriococcus orariensis Hoy, 1954

= Eriococcus orariensis =

Species of insect

Eriococcus orariensis, commonly known as the mānuka blight, is a felt scale insect in the genus Eriococcus. It is native to Australia, but was discovered in New Zealand in 1937 after being accidentally introduced to the country.

== Description ==
To identify and differentiate Eriococcus orariensis from similar Eriococcus species a microscope is needed. E. orariensis is sexually dimorphic. Adult females are typically light brown and an oval shape that tapers towards the anal lobes. Adult females lack wings and average 1.25mm in length and 0.84mm in width. Their antennae are six-segmented, the third segment being the longest. Female egg sacs are also greyish-white, closely felted, and open towards the anal end.

Eriococcus orariensis female dorsal (upper) and ventral (lower) body surfaces are membranous and irregularly covered in small, inconspicuous, bristle-like structures called setae; although the setae extend in semi-regular rows along the abdominal segments. There is no noticeable marginal fringe of setae on the dorsum, again excepting the distinct abdominal segments. A small number of quinquelocular sessile pores exist on the ventral abdominal segments in association with respiratory openings called spiracles. Contrastingly, long tubular ducts ending in cup-shaped pores cover the dorsum in moderate numbers, also concentrating on abdominal segments.

Eriococcus orariensis female anal lobes are cylindrical for two-thirds their length before tapering towards the base of much longer caudal (tail-like) setae. A prominent feature used to differentiate E. orariensis from other Eriococcus species in a key created by the entomologist, Dr James Mather Hoy, are three dorsal setae on the anal lobe: two towards the base and one two-thirds the distance up towards the inner margin. The anal ring has eight setae. Legs in both mature sexes are well developed, but relatively small for the species' size. Back leg tarsi are longer than tibiae. Curved claws at the end of each leg have a small tooth-like projection.

Eriococcus orariensis adult males are smaller than females, averaging 0.84mm in length. They are typically reddish-yellow with an abdominal spike and a pair of long filaments extending from the second to last abdominal segment. They have iridescent wings fringed with hairs, and halteres with a hook-like projection called a hamulus. Male puparia are oval, white, cottony and not as closely felted as females. Male antennae are ten-segmented with many setae, but the third segment is also longest. They have four light-detecting organs called ocelli: two close together on the mid-ventral surface, and two on the lateral margins. Adult males also have no mouthparts. Their legs are very setose, with a longer spine-like seta on each tibia.

The first instar nymphs of Eriococcus orariensis are pale pink or brown, with an average a 0.37mm length and 0.17mm width. They are most similar to adult females, with slight differences. For example, nymph anal lobes are more cone-like, their dorsal abdominal setae are more spine-like and arranged in rows lengthwise, and they only have six setae on their anal ring.

== Range ==
Eriococcus orariensis is native to Australia. There they are widely distributed through Southern and Eastern Australia, including Tasmania, but populations exist in low numbers there due to an abundance of natural predators and parasitoid species.

Eriococcus orariensis was first discovered in New Zealand in 1937 at Orari Gorge, Canterbury. It was introduced from Australia, but exactly when and how is unknown. The most likely theory is that it was accidentally introduced on imported ornamental Leptospermum scoparium (mānuka) plant material.

Initially, Eriococcus orariensis appeared restricted to Orari Gorge, with a slow spread through surrounding Geraldine through the 1940s. However, in the late 1940s-50s E. orariensis was deliberately spread to farms across the country due to its ability to kill mānuka within years of attack, which was considered a major pasture weed at the time. By 1954 it was widespread through mānuka populations on both main islands, likely aided by its release from natural enemies only found in Australia.

Today, although exact distributions of Eriococcus orariensis in New Zealand are unknown, it appears their population has been dramatically reduced in range to several sites in Nelson, Otago, Fiordland, and the West Coast, and replaced by the scale insects Acanthococcus campbelli (Hoy) and Acanthococcus leptospermi (Maskell). This is likely due to parasitism by the entomogenous fungi, Angatia thwaitesii Petch, 1924, discovered in New Zealand in 1957.

== Habitat ==
Eriococcus orariensis is host-specific to six species of Leptospermum plants in Australia. In New Zealand it is only found on Leptospermum scoparium (mānuka) and Kunzea ericoides (kānuka - previously Leptospermum ericoides). It can survive in all places those trees grow, but consistently establishes at higher rates on mānuka, as mānuka bark does not exfoliate in papery sheets like kānuka does, so offers many more establishing sites for the insect. E. orariensis occupies the specific niche of mānuka bark crevices in trunks and branches to avoid competition with other scale insects like Eriococcus leptospermi which occupies new plant growth. While male puparia sacs tend to cover the surface of sooty mold and bark on mānuka plants, female egg sacs and early E. orariensis stages tend to stay sheltered under the bark.

== Ecology ==
=== Life cycle ===
Eriococcus orariensis eggs are laid around February in New Zealand inside a sac that the female produces around herself. A single egg is laid approximately every eight hours, until an average of 47 eggs are laid per female, although females often die before all eggs are laid. Typically, eggs hatch within 15 minutes of being laid, regardless of external factors. Nymphs then remain inactive for a variable period, depending on environmental temperatures. If air temperatures are above 21 °C, nymphs will begin rapidly moving across the host plant surface 20 minutes after hatching in search of a feeding site. Using their antennae to feel the bark surface, this search can take hours to days until the nymph finds a suitable crevice to wedge itself into and insert its mouthparts.

First-stage nymphs do not tend to travel once attached to a feeding site. They feed and grow for several months until they increase by about 1.7x in length and 1.9x in width. The feeding period can vary depending on when nymphs hatch, but is finished by September. When finished, nymphs remove their mouthparts from the host plant.

If female, within 2–3 days of finishing the feeding period around September, the nymph will moult and an intermediate female stage will emerge and reinsert its mouthparts to continue feeding and growing within 6–8 hours. They do not usually travel, unless the plant material in their crevice has dried out. Around October they moult again, and an adult female emerges, reinserts their mouthparts within 6 hours, and continues feeding.

When male nymphs finish the feeding period, second stage males travel across the host plant to find a site to build a puparium. They appear to prefer sheltered sites like bark crevices, but can settle on any surface if a plant is overly populated. Puparium sacs are completed from waxy filaments excreted from dorsal tubular ducts 4–6 days after a site is found. Prepupa emerge 2–3 days after completion and adult males emerge between October–January.

Mating occurs October–January. Males may mate multiple times, but do not feed, so die within days. Females only mate once, so only one generation occurs per year. Within two hours of fertilisation, females drastically increase production of waxy threads from their sessile pores and tubular ducts, encasing themselves in a sac within 4–6 days, ready for egg laying.

=== Diet and foraging ===
Eriococcus orariensis is host-specific to a small number of plant species, only feeding on Leptospermum scoparium (mānuka) and Kunzea ericoides (kānuka) in New Zealand, and several other Leptospermum species in Australia. E. orariensis are sap feeders for several life cycle stages, the most important being the feeding stage of first-stage nymphs. Once a suitable feeding site is found, the nymph will wedge itself firmly into the crevice. It then inserts its piercing, sucking mouthparts into the plant tissue, arching its body and thrusting forwards to push itself deeper. It then feeds in the sap stream for several months, staying in the same spot. Because plant sap is mainly sugar, the insects must feed continuously to get required nutrients like nitrogen and excrete excess sugar through their anal opening. Intermediate-stage and adult females also feed continuously in this manner, usually not moving from the feeding site they selected as nymphs. Adult males do not feed again, as they lack mouthparts after emerging from their puparium.

=== Predators, parasites, and diseases ===
Despite initial devastation of Eriococcus orariensis on mānuka populations across New Zealand, its numbers plummeted from the late 1950s onwards, following the likely accidental introduction of the entomogenous fungi, Angatia thwaitesii, from Australia. Once fungal mycelia enter the insect, they quickly grow through the body and kill the insect, using up its nutrients until a black mass of hyphae remain. All insect life stages are vulnerable to A. thwaitesii, although adult females are attacked most frequently. Interestingly, A. thwaitesii is likely a specific pathogen of E. orariensis as no other Eriococcus species in New Zealand or Australia are attacked. This partially explains why species like E. campbelli and E. leptospermi have replaced E. orariensis as successful mānuka scale insects nationwide.

The Australian ladybeetle, Rhyzobius ventralis Erichson, 1843, also predates Eriococcus oraiensis, however, it is mainly associated with the gum tree scale, Eriococcus coriaceus. As a result, its effect on E. oraiensis is minimal.

== Cultural uses ==
Perhaps the most interesting thing about Eriococcus orariensis, apart from its drastic population bottleneck associated with Angatia thwaitesii, is the lengths people took to spread a known plant blight. When E. orariensis was first noted in the late 1930s, mānuka trees died within several years of insect invasion. By the late 1940s, it was supposedly hard to find live mānuka anywhere in South Canterbury. This was because large, uncontrolled populations of E. orariensis remove too many nutrients for a tree to survive. Additionally, their sugar excretions promote the growth of the sooty mold, Capnodium walteri Sacc, 1893, which reduces plant photosynthetic capacity.

Far from causing concern as the discovery of a new blight might today, Eriococcus orariensis was quickly and widely adopted by farmers to remove mānuka, which was perceived as a pesky, economically damaging weed. The New Zealand Department of Scientific and Industrial Research even suggested "mānuka blight" was the most efficient biological control of a plant ever seen in New Zealand. Infected material was frantically sold, distributed via post, and even aerial dropped in the North Island.
