= Eriococcus =

Eriococcus is a scientific name which has been used for multiple distinct genera. It may refer to:

- Eriococcus (bug) the type genus of Eriococcidae
- A scientific synonym of Phyllanthus
