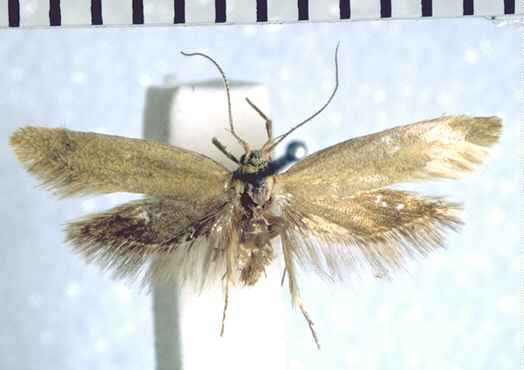
- Male holotype

Scientific classification
- Kingdom: Animalia
- Phylum: Arthropoda
- Class: Insecta
- Order: Lepidoptera
- Family: Oecophoridae
- Genus: Tingena
- Species: T. paula

Binomial name
- Tingena paula (Philpott, 1927)

Synonyms
- Borkhausenia paula Philpott, 1927

= Tingena paula =

Species of moth, endemic to New Zealand

Tingena paula is a species of moth in the family Oecophoridae. It is endemic to New Zealand and has been observed in Canterbury. Adults of this species are on the wing in November.

== Taxonomy ==
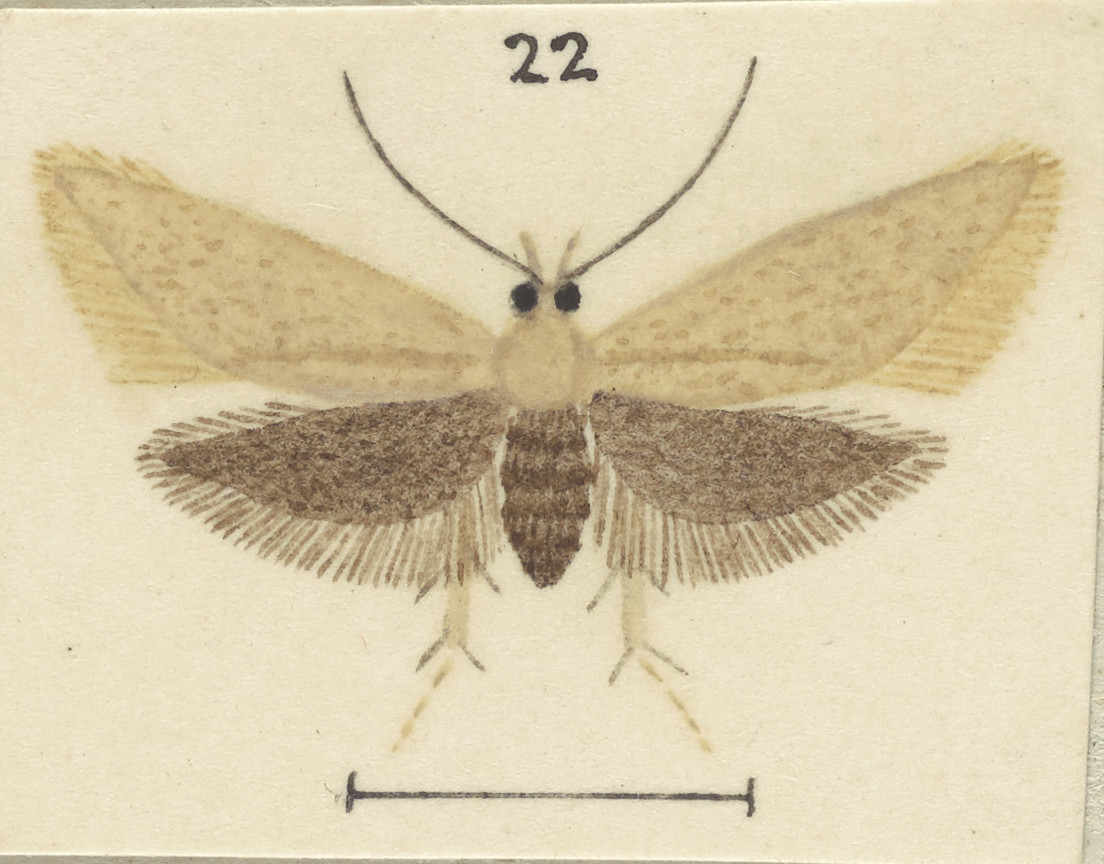
Illustration of T. paula by George Hudson.

This species was first described by Alfred Philpott in 1927 using specimens collected by S. Lindsay at Pukeatua Bush, Banks Peninsula in November. Philpott originally named the species Borkhausenia paula. In 1928 George Hudson discussed and illustrated this species in his 1928 publication The butterflies and moths of New Zealand using the same name. In 1988 John Dugdale placed this species within the genus Tingena. The male holotype is held in the Canterbury Museum.

== Description ==
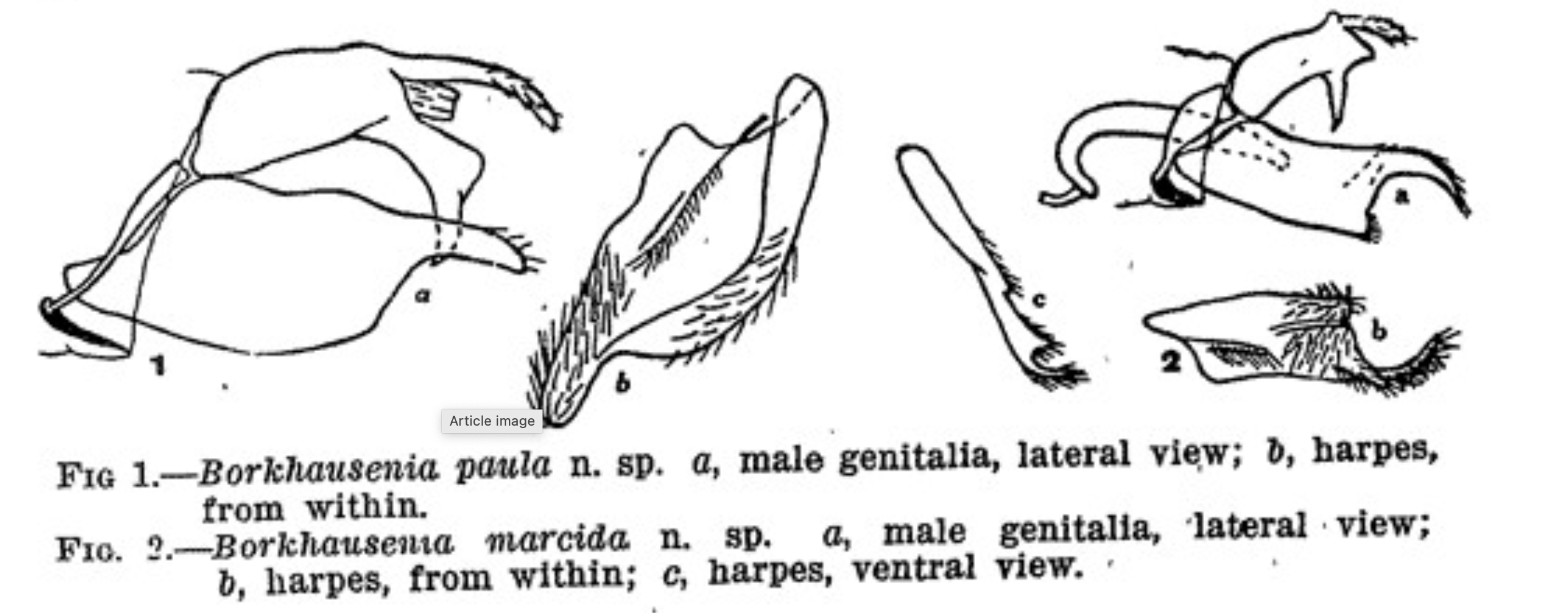
Tingena paula Illustration of genitalia.

Philpott described the species as follows:

♂. 11–12 mm. Head, palpi and thorax pale ivory-yellow. Antennae fuscous with pale dots, ciliations slightly more than 1. Abdomen dark purplish-grey. Legs ochreous-whitish mixed with pale brown. Forewings blunt lanceolate, costa moderately arched, apex round-pointed, termen very oblique; pale ivory-yellow; extreme edge of costa near base fuscous; fringes concolorous with wing. Hindwings dark fuscous: fringes greyish-fuscous: fringes greyish-fuscous with darker basal line.

This species is small and is similar in appearance to T. maranta but has less pointed forewings.

== Distribution ==
This species is endemic to New Zealand and has been observed in Canterbury. This species has also been found in a site of ecological significance in Christchurch as set out in the Christchurch District Plan.

== Behaviour ==
Adults of this species is on the wing in November.
