= Acanthococcus =

Acanthococcus may refer to:

- Acanthococcus (bug), a genus of true bugs in the family Eriococcidae
- Acanthococcus (alga), a genus of red algae in the family Cystocloniaceae
