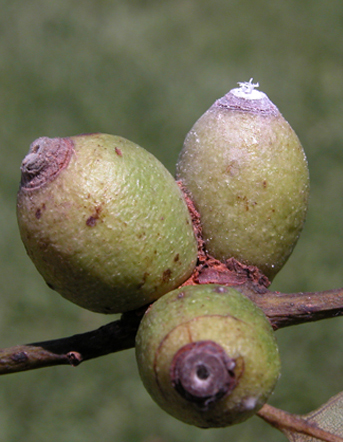
- Apiomorpha conica galls of 3 adult females.

Scientific classification
- Kingdom: Animalia
- Phylum: Arthropoda
- Class: Insecta
- Order: Hemiptera
- Suborder: Sternorrhyncha
- Superfamily: Coccoidea
- Family: Eriococcidae
- Genus: Apiomorpha; Rübsaamen

species
- See text

= Apiomorpha =

Genus of true bugs

Apiomorpha is a genus of scale insect that induces galls on species of Eucalyptus. Galls are initiated by first-instar nymphs (crawlers) on new plant growth and, when mature, the galls exhibit marked sexual dimorphism. Those induced by females are among the largest and most spectacular of arthropod-induced galls whereas those of males are small and most are tubular. Apiomorpha is known only from Australia and New Guinea although its host, Eucalyptus, has a wider distribution into Indonesia as well.

Apiomorpha is currently classified in the Eriococcidae, but this family is not monophyletic.

== Morphology ==
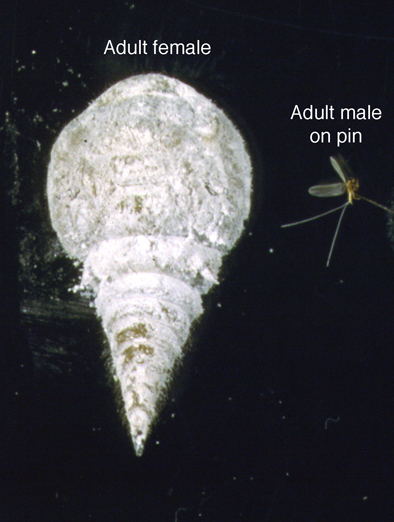
Adult female of Apiomorpha alongside a winged adult male on a pin

Like other scale insects, Apiomorpha is highly sexually dimorphic. Adult females are wingless, have very small (or no) eyes, and their legs are short and stubby. A female remains within the gall she initiated when a crawler, mating through the small apical opening of her gall. She reproduces inside the gall and her tiny offspring (≤ 0.4 mm) escape through the same small opening. Adult females of Apiomorpha can range in length from 2 mm to 45 mm, depending on species, and can live up to five years as adults. In contrast, adult males of Apiomorpha are small (about 1 mm in length) and winged. Like males of other eriococcids, they do not have a mouth and, instead, have an extra pair of eyes on the underside of their head (i.e., they have four eyes, two on top and two underneath). Males leave their galls as adults and search for females. They are weak fliers and typically walk on their host plant looking for females before taking to the air. After leaving their gall, adult males only live about one day.

== Species ==
- Apiomorpha amarooensis Brimblecombe, 1959
- Apiomorpha annulata Froggatt, 1930
- Apiomorpha attenuata (Froggatt, 1898)
- Apiomorpha baeuerleni (Froggatt, 1893)
- Apiomorpha calycina (Tepper, 1893)
- Apiomorpha conica (Froggatt, 1893)
- Apiomorpha crispa (Fuller, 1896)
- Apiomorpha cucurbita Fuller, 1897
- Apiomorpha densispinosa Gullan, 1984
- Apiomorpha dipsaciformis (Froggatt, 1895)
- Apiomorpha duplex (Schrader, 1863)
- Apiomorpha excupula (Fuller, 1896)
- Apiomorpha floralis (Froggatt, 1898)
- Apiomorpha frenchi Froggatt, 1921
- Apiomorpha gongylocarpae Mills, Garland, Semple & Cook, 2016
- Apiomorpha gullanae Cook, 2003
- Apiomorpha helmsii Fuller, 1897
- Apiomorpha hilli Froggatt, 1921
- Apiomorpha intermedia Gullan, 1984
- Apiomorpha jucundacrispi Mills, Garland, Semple & Cook, 2016
- Apiomorpha karschi Rübsaamen, 1894
- Apiomorpha longiloba Brimblecombe, 1959
- Apiomorpha macqueeni Froggatt, 1929
- Apiomorpha maliformis Fuller, 1897
- Apiomorpha malleeacola Gullan, 1984
- Apiomorpha munita (Schrader, 1863)
- Apiomorpha nookara Mills, MacDonald, Rigby & Cook, 2011
- Apiomorpha ovicola (Schrader, 1863)
- Apiomorpha ovicoloides (Tepper, 1893)
- Apiomorpha pedunculata (Fuller, 1896)
- Apiomorpha pharetrata (Schrader, 1863)
- Apiomorpha pileata (Schrader, 1863) (type species of "Apiomorpha")
- Apiomorpha pomaphora Gullan & Jones, 1989
- Apiomorpha regularis (Tepper, 1893)
- Apiomorpha rosaeformis (Froggatt, 1895)
- Apiomorpha sessilis (Froggatt, 1895)
- Apiomorpha sloanei (Froggatt, 1898)
- Apiomorpha spinifer Froggatt, 1930
- Apiomorpha strombylosa (Tepper, 1893)
- Apiomorpha subconica (Tepper, 1893)
- Apiomorpha tepperi Gullan, 1984
- Apiomorpha thorntoni (Tepper, 1893)
- Apiomorpha urnalis (Tepper, 1893)
- Apiomorpha variabilis (Froggatt, 1893)
- Apiomorpha withersi Froggatt, 1931
