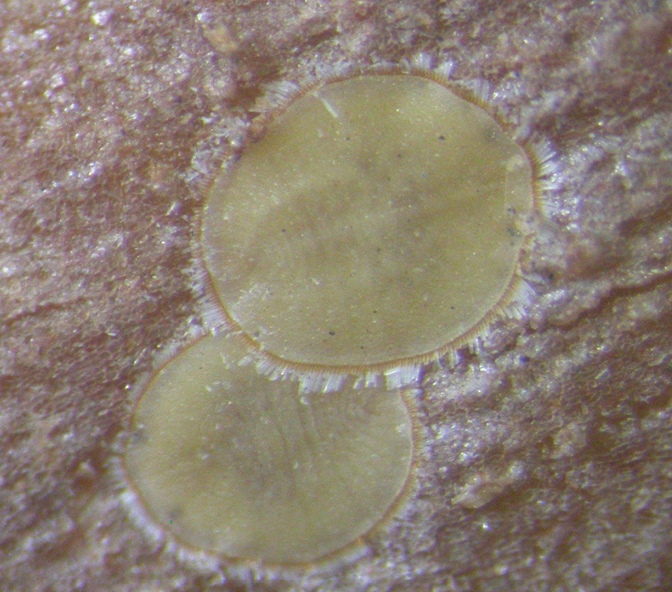
- Lachnodius sealakeensis, Victoria, Australia

Scientific classification
- Domain: Eukaryota
- Kingdom: Animalia
- Phylum: Arthropoda
- Class: Insecta
- Order: Hemiptera
- Suborder: Sternorrhyncha
- Family: Eriococcidae
- Genus: Lachnodius; Maskell, 1896

= Lachnodius =

Genus of true bugs

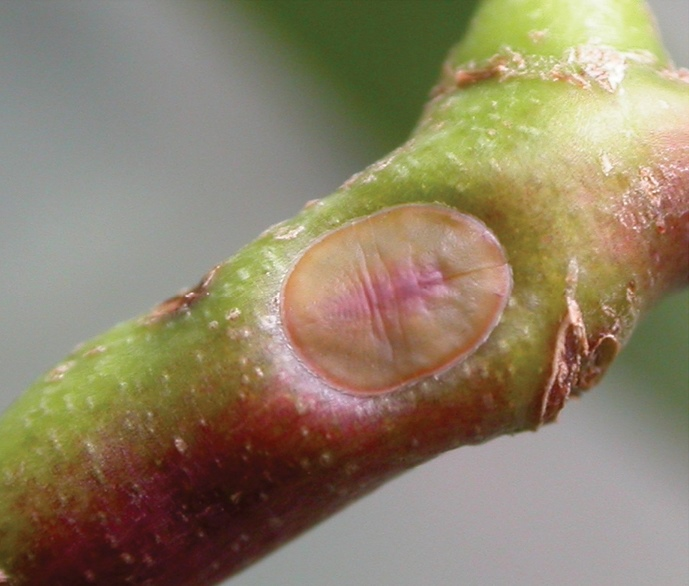
Lachnodius lectularius, Victoria, Australia

Lachnodius is a genus of eriococcid scales, or felt scale insects, in the family Eriococcidae. There are at least 10 described species in Lachnodius, found in Australia.

== Species ==
These species belong to the genus Lachnodius:

- Lachnodius brimblecombei Beardsley, Gullan & Hardy, 2019
- Lachnodius eucalypti (Maskell, 1892)
- Lachnodius froggatti Beardsley, Gullan & Hardy, 2019
- Lachnodius hirsutus (Froggatt, 1921)
- Lachnodius lectularius Maskell, 1896
- Lachnodius maculosus Beardsley, Gullan & Hardy, 2019
- Lachnodius melliodorae Beardsley, Gullan & Hardy, 2019
- Lachnodius newi Beardsley, Gullan & Hardy, 2019
- Lachnodius parathrix Beardsley, Gullan & Hardy, 2019
- Lachnodius sealakeensis Gullan & Hardy, 2019
