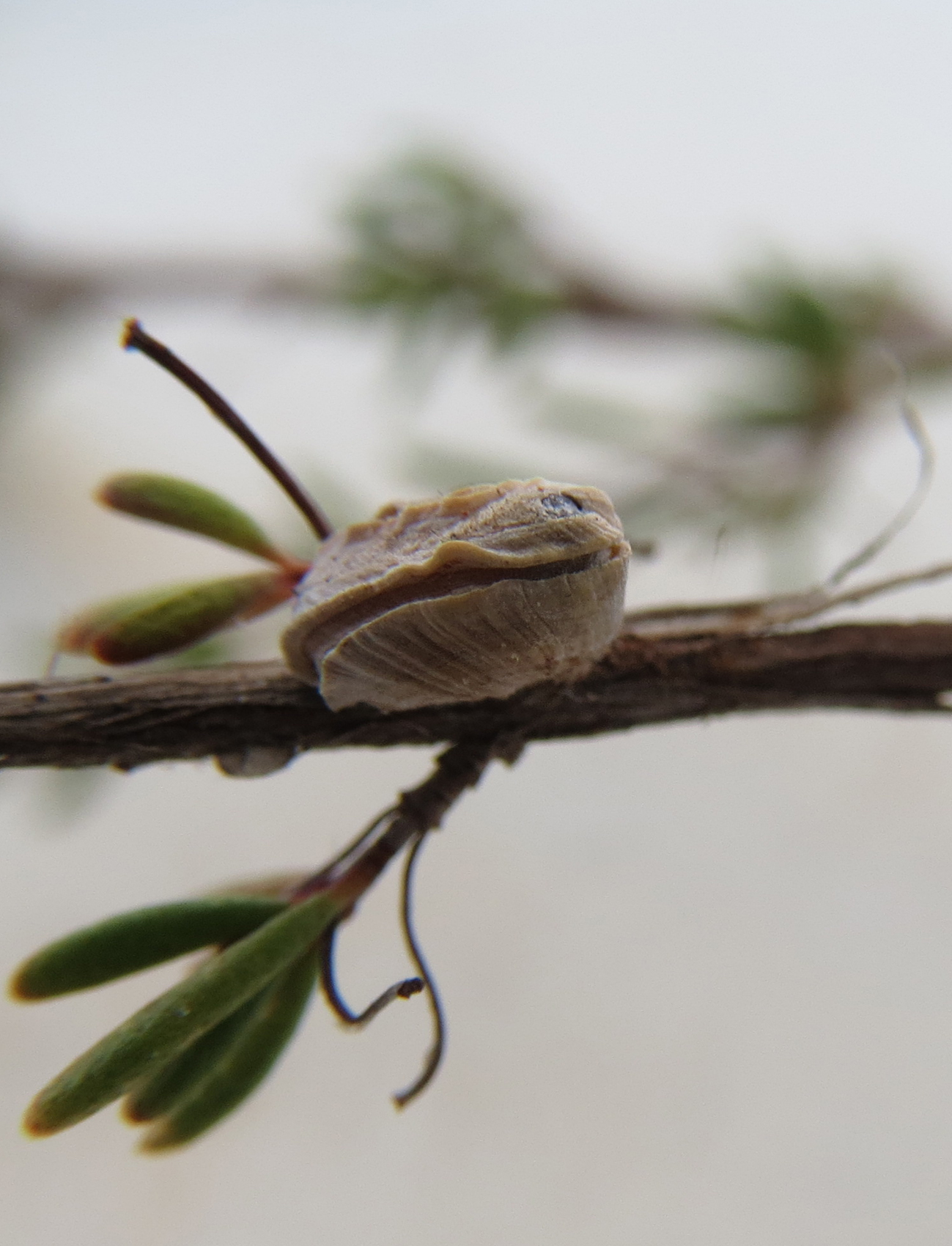
- Adult female of Callococcus pulchellus

Scientific classification
- Kingdom: Animalia
- Phylum: Arthropoda
- Class: Insecta
- Order: Hemiptera
- Suborder: Sternorrhyncha
- Family: Eriococcidae
- Genus: Callococcus; Ferris

species
- Callococcus acaciae; Callococcus leptospermi; Callococcus newmanni; Callococcus pulchellus

= Callococcus =

Genus of true bugs

Callococcus is a genus of Australian scale insect that feeds on species of Leptospermum, Hypocalymma, Kunzea and some other members of the tribes Chamelaucieae and Leptospermeae in the myrtle family Myrtaceae. Callococcus leptospermi induces stem-swelling galls on some species of Leptospermum, and it is considered to be a potential biological control agent of Leptospermum laevigatum in South Africa. The other described species of Callococcus do not induce galls.

== Morphology ==
As for most scale insects, the taxonomy of Callococcus is based on the morphology of the adult female. Like adult females of other scale insects, those of Callococcus have no wings. They also have no legs and their antennae are reduced to tiny stubs. Adult females are sack-like and range in colour from burgundy to yellowish or brown.

Adult females of Callococcus acaciae are globular and a red-burgundy colour. They feed on species of Kunzea and are covered in a curly, stretchy wax that is exuded from glands on their dorsum.

Adult females of Callococcus newmanni and C. pulchellus are similar to each other, and females of both species produce a waxy covering that looks like a small clam or shell-fish.

Adult females of C. leptospermi are sausage-shaped and brownish in colour. Once a female initiates a gall as a nymph she never leaves, and she mates, reproduces and dies inside the gall. C. leptospermi is ovoviviparous, meaning that the embryos develop inside the female, nourished by special cells (not a placenta), and are born fully developed. First-instar nymphs (crawlers) of C. leptospermi are generally a pinkish colour and have well-developed legs and antennae. They have numerous 8-shaped pores on their dorsum (back). Unusually among scale insects, male and female crawlers of C. leptospermi exhibit sexual dimorphism. Adult males of C. leptospermi are winged (single pair, as in other winged male scale insects), pinkish in colour, and have a long slender abdomen.

== Systematics ==
The type species, C. pulchellus, was described by Maskell in 1897 (as Sphaerococcus pulchellus) and the genus Callococcus was erected in 1918 by Ferris because it was recognised that the species did not belong in the mealybug genus Sphaerococcus.

Callococcus had been placed in the family Asterolecaniidae (the pit scales) based on the presence of 8-shaped pores on the dorsum of nymphs, because this character was interpreted as being diagnostic for this family. Recent DNA-based phylogenies indicate that the genus is closely related to some Australian gall-inducing eriococcid scale insects. Subsequently, Callococcus was transferred to the family Eriococcidae (the felt scales).
