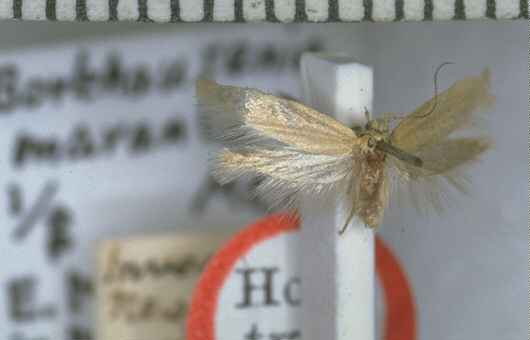
- Male holotype

Scientific classification
- Kingdom: Animalia
- Phylum: Arthropoda
- Class: Insecta
- Order: Lepidoptera
- Family: Oecophoridae
- Genus: Tingena
- Species: T. maranta

Binomial name
- Tingena maranta (Meyrick, 1886)

Synonyms
- Oecophora maranta Meyrick, 1886; Borkhausenia maranta (Meyrick, 1886)

= Tingena maranta =

Species of moth, endemic to New Zealand

Tingena maranta is a species of moth in the family Oecophoridae. It is endemic to New Zealand and is found in the lower South Island. Adults of this species are on the wing from October until January. This species prefers grass or low herb habitat. Unlike its close relatives it does not inhabit native forest.

== Taxonomy ==
This species was originally described by Edward Meyrick in 1886 using a specimen collected by Alfred Philpott in December at Invercargill and named Oecophora maranta. In 1915 Meyrick discussed this species under the name Borkhausenia maranta. In 1926 Alfred Philpott discussed and illustrated the genitalia of the male of this species. In 1928 George Hudson also discussed and illustrated this species in his book The butterflies and moths of New Zealand. In 1988 J. S. Dugdale placed this species within the genus Tingena. The male holotype is held at the Natural History Museum, London.

== Description ==
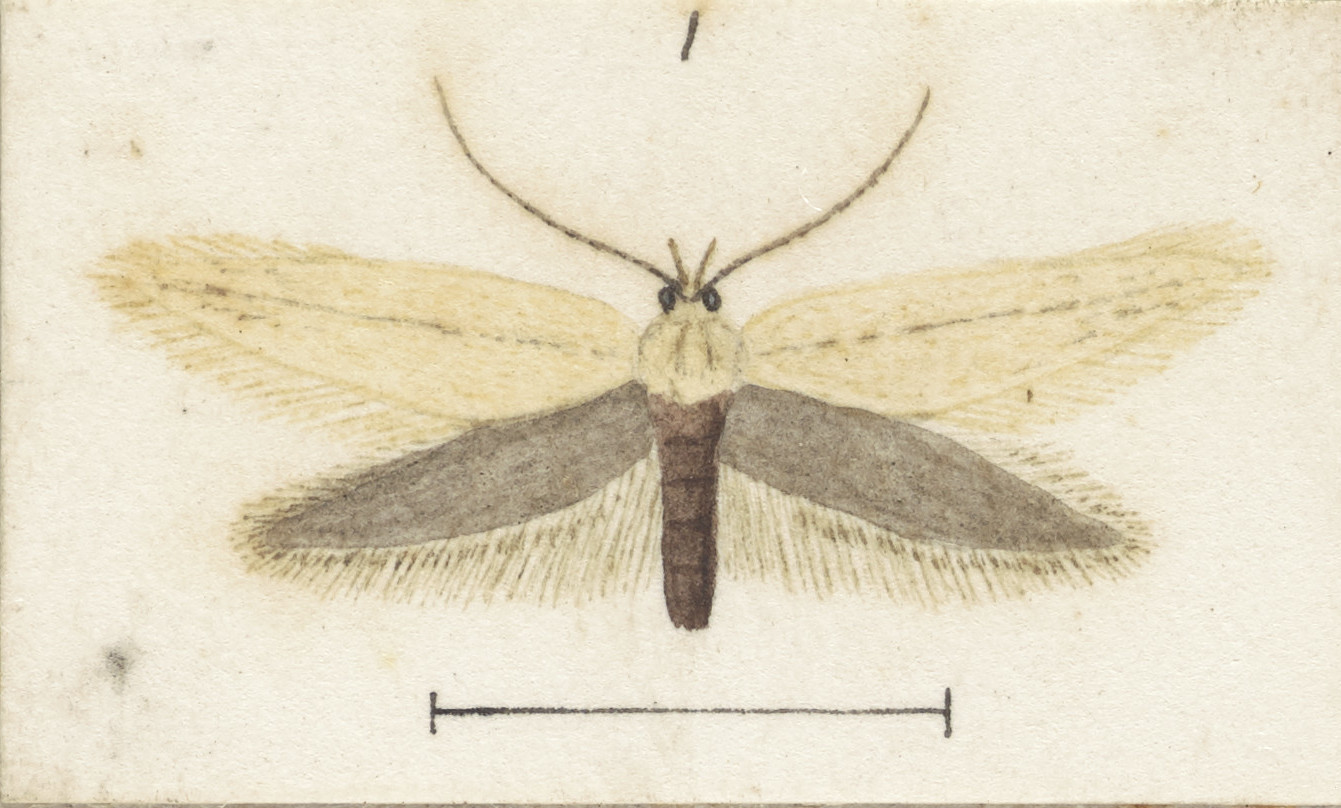
Male T. maranta illustrated by George Hudson.

Meyrick described this species as follows:

♂. 12 mm. Head, palpi, antennae, thorax, abdomen, and legs whitish-ochreous. Forewings elongate, narrow, costa moderately arched, apex round-pointed, hindmargin extremely obliquely rounded; pale whitish-ochreous; extreme base of costa dark fuscous : cilia pale whitish-ochreous. Hindwings grey-whitish; cilia very pale whitish-ochreous.

This species is pale in colouration and has distinctively narrow forewings.

== Distribution ==
This species is endemic to New Zealand and has been observed in Invercargill, as well as at Dunedin, Mount Ida, Central Otago and Mount Earnslaw / Pikirakatahi.

== Behaviour ==
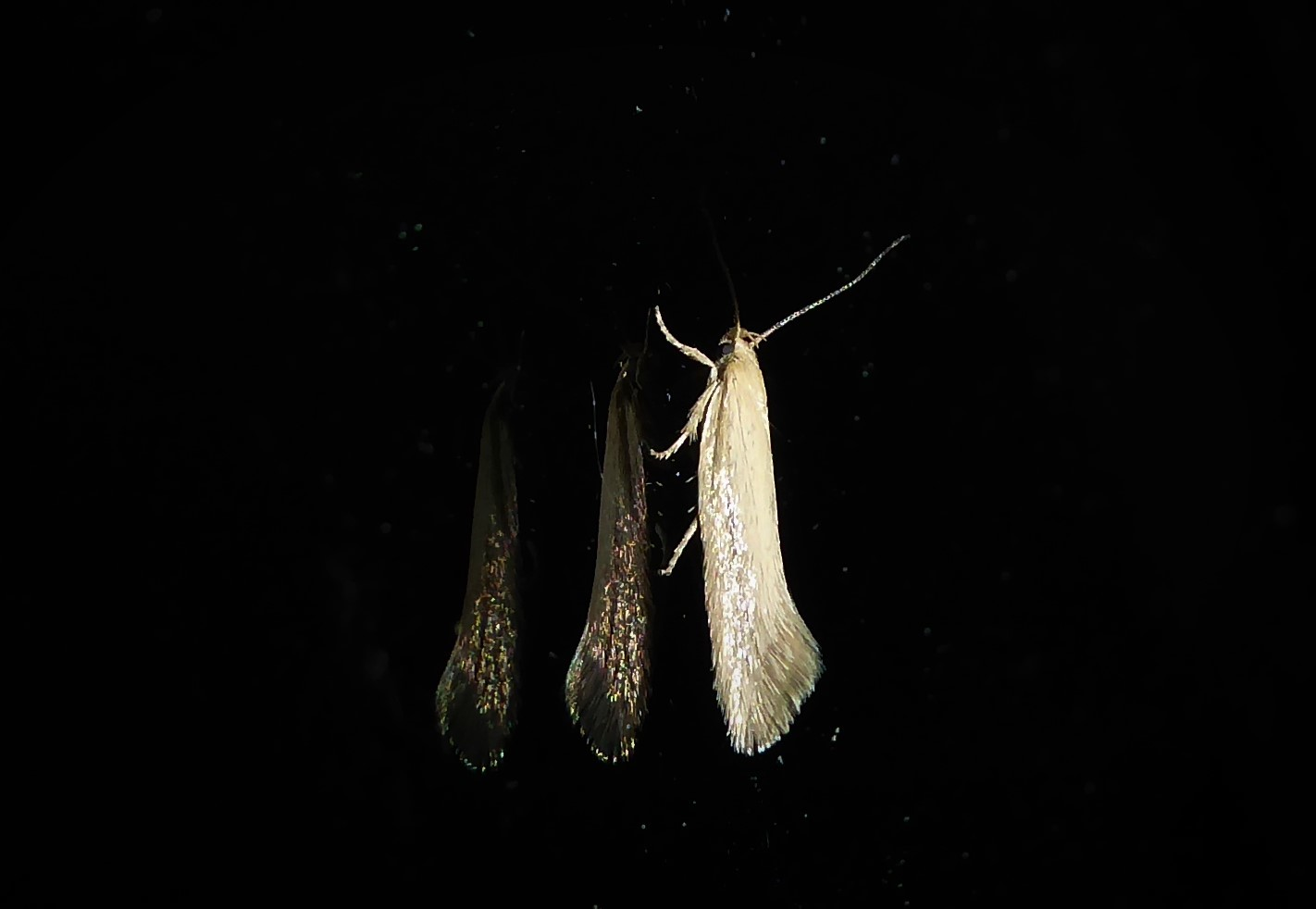

Adults are nocturnal and are on the wing from October until January.

== Habitat and hosts ==
This species prefers to inhabit areas with grass or low herbs, and does not inhabit native forest. Specimens have been collected in kānuka shrubland. The larvae of T. maranta feed on leaf litter with specimens having been found in Poa litter.
