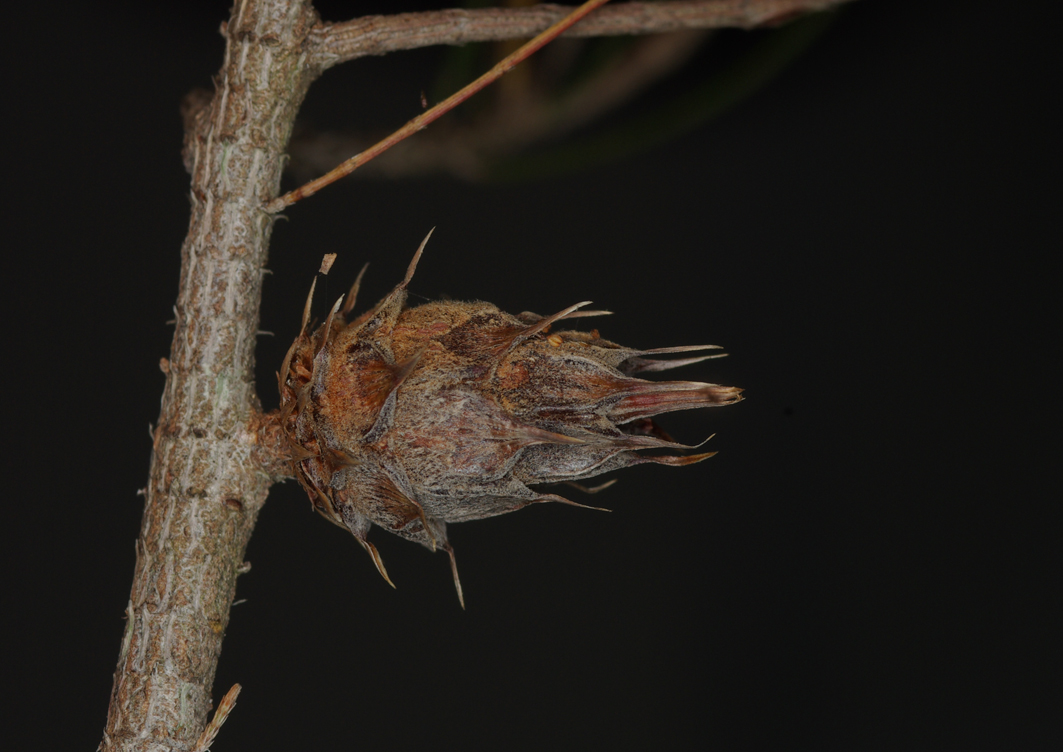
- Gall of adult female of C. spiniferus

Scientific classification
- Kingdom: Animalia
- Phylum: Arthropoda
- Class: Insecta
- Order: Hemiptera
- Suborder: Sternorrhyncha
- Family: Eriococcidae
- Genus: Cylindrococcus; Maskell

= Cylindrococcus =

Genus of true bugs

Cylindrococcus is a genus of scale insects that induces galls on plants of the genus Allocasuarina. There are two described species of Cylindrococcus, both of which occur only in Australia. The galls of adult females (10–30 mm long) look somewhat similar to the cone-like "fruit" of the host plant and might be mistaken for such.

== Systematics ==
Cylindrococcus is currently classified in the scale insect family Eriococcidae although, at times, it has been placed in its own family, Cylindrococcidae. Recent molecular phylogenies show that Cylindrococcus is closely related to the type species of Eriococcidae, Eriococcus buxi, so its placement in this family is probably correct.

There are two species currently recognised in Cylindrococcus, C. casuarinae (the type species) and C. spiniferus, which can be easily differentiated by the appearance of the galls induced by adult females. The galls of C. casuarinae are long, narrow and relatively smooth whereas those of C. spiniferus are broad and have prominent bracts. Two other species have been described in the past but are no longer recognised as distinct species: C. amplior is in synonymy with C. casuarinae, and C. gracilis has been synonymised with C. spiniferus.

== Morphology ==
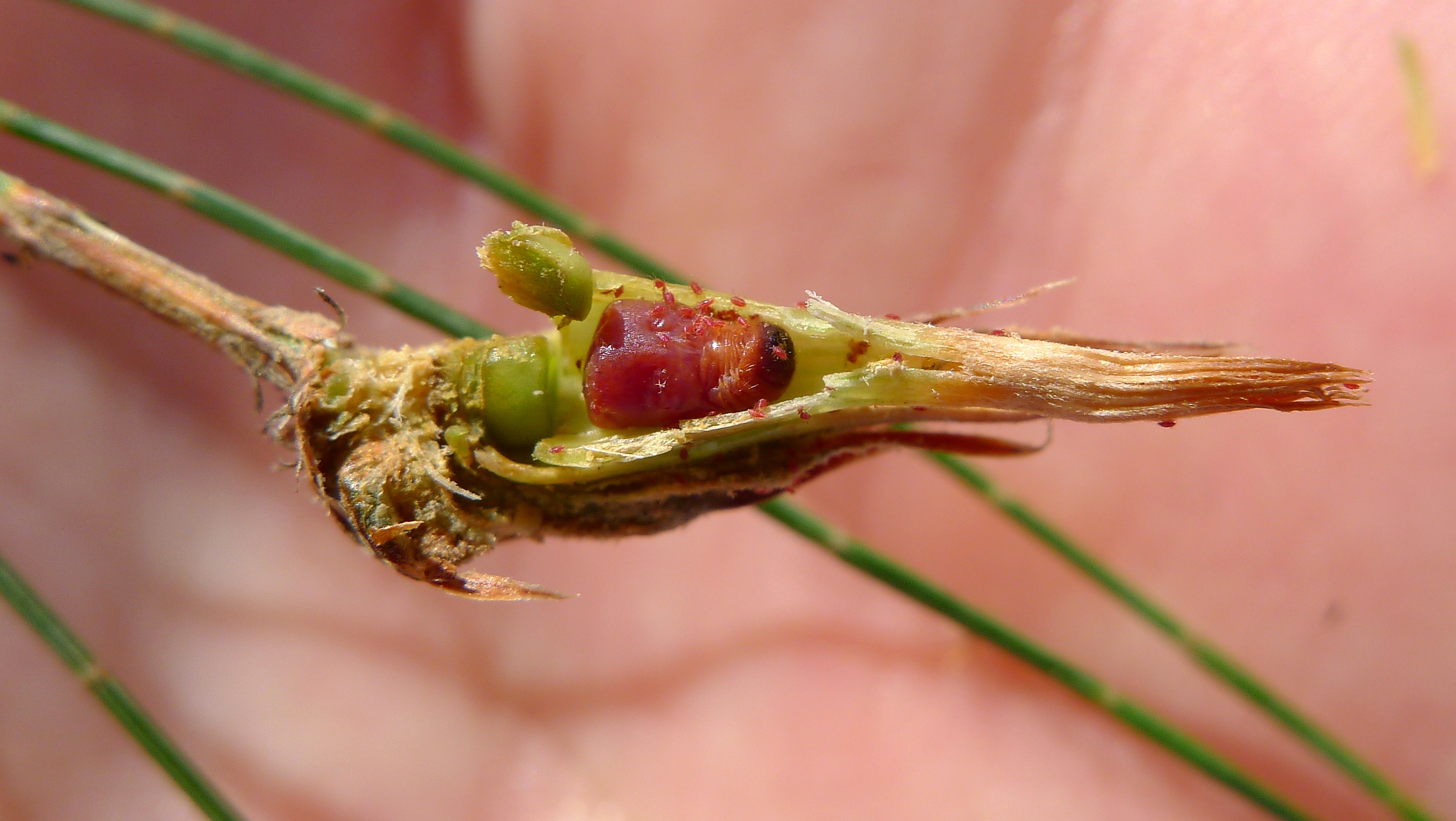
Female C. spiniferus surrounded by tiny nymphs

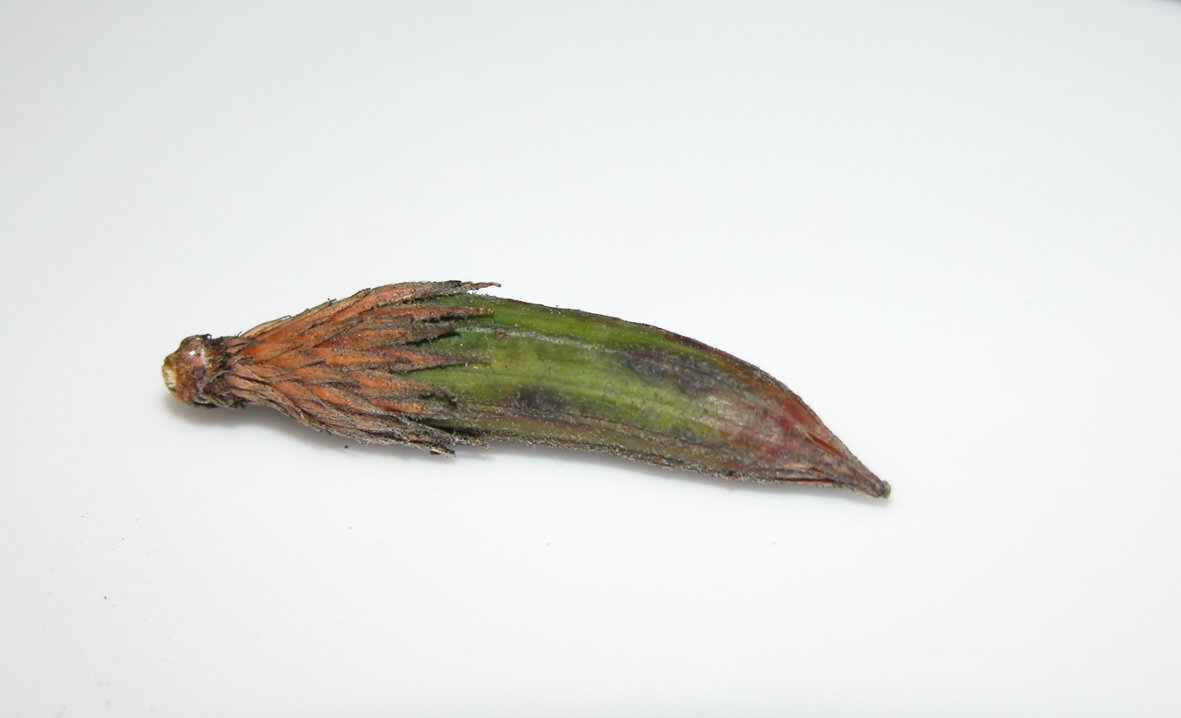
Gall of adult female of C. casuarinae

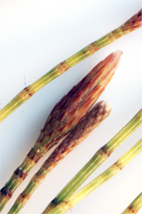
Gall of male of C. spiniferus

Like most scale insects, Cylindrococcus exhibits marked sexual dimorphism. Adult females are wingless, practically legless and cylindrical, and about 2–9 mm in length. Adult females of C. casuarinae have large, bulbous membranous lobes where the mid and hind legs would be, whereas C. spiniferus has only sclerotised patches in these areas. Adult females of the two species can also be separated by the semicircular plates with robust spines near the anus of C. spiniferus that are not present in C. casuarinae.

Adult males are small (about 3–5 mm long) and winged. Adult males have very long thin external genitalia that, it has been argued, allow them to mate with adult females that are deep within galls. Males induce their own galls (7–17 mm long), which are long and thin bract-like galls on the tip of branchlets.

Males and females are both a reddish colour: reddish brown or burgundy for females, and a reddish pink for males.

== See also ==
- Casuarinaceae
- Allocasuarina
