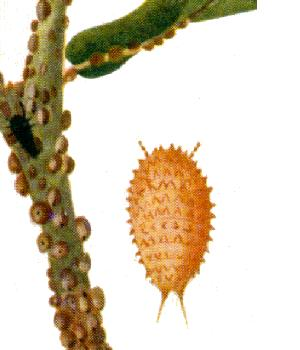
- Eriococcus coriaceus (CSIRO)

Scientific classification
- Domain: Eukaryota
- Kingdom: Animalia
- Phylum: Arthropoda
- Class: Insecta
- Order: Hemiptera
- Suborder: Sternorrhyncha
- Family: Eriococcidae
- Genus: Eriococcus; Targioni-Tozzetti, 1868

Synonyms
- Gossiparia Chorbadzhiev, 1939; Gossyperia Kuwana, 1907; Priococcus Fulmek, 1943; Thekes Maskell, 1892

= Eriococcus (bug) =

Genus of true bugs

Eriococcus is the type genus of scale insects in the family Eriococcidae, erected by Targioni-Tozzetti in 1868. Species records have a world-wide distribution, but this genus name is known to be polyphyletic, so species placement is subject to change.

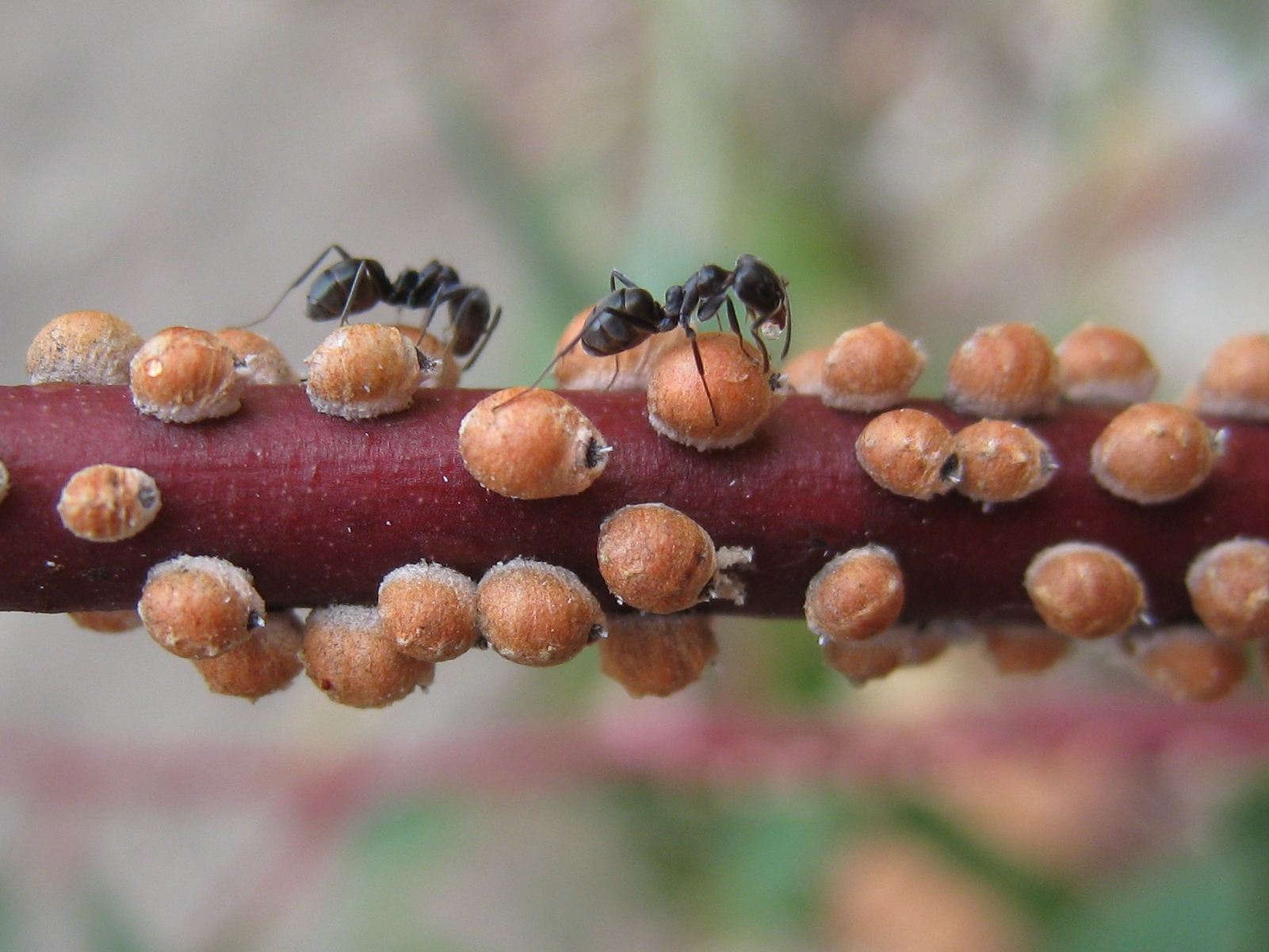
E. coriaceus with associated ants

== Species ==
As of May 2024, the Global Biodiversity Information Facility lists:

1. Eriococcus abaii (Danzig, 1990)
2. Eriococcus abditus Hoy, 1962
3. Eriococcus abeliceae Kuwana, 1927
4. Eriococcus acericola Tang & Hao, 1995
5. Eriococcus aconeae Henderson, 2006
6. Eriococcus actius (Miller & Miller, 1993)
7. Eriococcus acutispinatus Hoy, 1962
8. Eriococcus acutus Goux, 1938
9. Eriococcus adenostomae Ehrhorn, 1898
10. Eriococcus adzharicus (Hadzibeyli, 1960)
11. Eriococcus agonis Fuller, 1897
12. Eriococcus agropyri (Borchsenius, 1949)
13. Eriococcus albatus Hoy, 1962
14. Eriococcus alpina (Pellizzari, 1999)
15. Eriococcus altaicus (Matesova, 1967)
16. Eriococcus ammophilus Balachowsky, 1933
17. Eriococcus amomidis Gómez-Menor Ortega, 1935
18. Eriococcus angulatus Froggatt, 1916
19. Eriococcus apiomorphae Fuller, 1897
20. Eriococcus araucariae Maskell, 1879
21. Eriococcus arboisi Goux, 1991
22. Eriococcus arcanus Hoy, 1962
23. Eriococcus arctostaphyli Ferris, 1955
24. Eriococcus arenariae (Miller & Miller, 1993)
25. Eriococcus arenosus Cockerell, 1897
26. Eriococcus argentifagi Hoy, 1962
27. Eriococcus armeniacus Tang & Hao, 1995
28. Eriococcus artemisiarum (Matesova, 1976)
29. Eriococcus arthrophyti (Borchsenius, 1949)
30. Eriococcus artiguesi Goux, 1991
31. Eriococcus asteliae Hoy, 1962
32. Eriococcus aurescens Cockerell, 1902
33. Eriococcus australis Maskell, 1895
34. Eriococcus azaleae Comstock, 1881
35. Eriococcus azumae Kanda, 1933
36. Eriococcus baldonensis (Rasina, 1966)
37. Eriococcus bambusae Green, 1922
38. Eriococcus barri (Miller, 1991)
39. Eriococcus beilschmiediae Hoy, 1962
40. Eriococcus beshearae (Miller & Miller, 1993)
41. Eriococcus betulaefoliae Tang & Hao, 1995
42. Eriococcus bezzii Leonardi, 1907
43. Eriococcus bicolor (Froggatt, 1915)
44. Eriococcus boguschi McDaniel, 1964
45. Eriococcus borchsenii (Danzig, 1975)
46. Eriococcus brachypodii (Borchsenius & Danzig, 1966)
47. Eriococcus brasiliensis Cockerell, 1900
48. Eriococcus brevenniae Goux, 1993
49. Eriococcus brittini Hoy, 1962
50. Eriococcus brucius Goux, 1995
51. Eriococcus busariae Froggatt, 1916
52. Eriococcus buxi (Boyer de Fonscolombe, 1834)
53. Eriococcus cactearum Leonardi, 1918
54. Eriococcus campbelli Hoy, 1959
55. Eriococcus campinensis Hempel, 1937
56. Eriococcus cantium Williams, 1985
57. Eriococcus carolinae Williams, 1969
58. Eriococcus castanopus Tang & Hao, 1995
59. Eriococcus casuarinae (Maskell, 1893)
60. Eriococcus caudatus Tang & Hao, 1995
61. Eriococcus cavellii (Maskell, 1890)
62. Eriococcus celmisiae (Maskell, 1884)
63. Eriococcus centaureae (Savescu, 1985)
64. Eriococcus chabohiba Kuwana & Nitobe, 1918
65. Eriococcus chalazogamarum (Lindinger, 1933)
66. Eriococcus chaoticus Goux, 1991
67. Eriococcus chathamensis Hoy, 1962
68. Eriococcus chilensis Miller & González, 1975
69. Eriococcus chilos (Miller & Miller, 1993)
70. Eriococcus cingulatus Kiritchenko, 1940
71. Eriococcus cistacearum Goux, 1936
72. Eriococcus coccineus Cockerell, 1894
73. Eriococcus coffeae Hempel, 1919
74. Eriococcus confluens (Maskell, 1893)
75. Eriococcus confusus Maskell, 1892
76. Eriococcus conspersus Maskell, 1893
77. Eriococcus constrictus Froggatt, 1933
78. Eriococcus coprosmae Hoy, 1962
79. Eriococcus coriaceus Maskell, 1893
80. Eriococcus corniculatus Ferris, 1950
81. Eriococcus coronillae (Tereznikova, 1977)
82. Eriococcus costaricensis Cockerell & Robinson, 1915
83. Eriococcus costatus (Danzig, 1975)
84. Eriococcus crassispinus (Borchsenius, 1949)
85. Eriococcus crenilobatus Hoy, 1962
86. Eriococcus crispus (Boyer de Fonscolombe, 1834)
87. Eriococcus crofti Froggatt, 1916
88. Eriococcus cryptus Cockerell, 1901
89. Eriococcus cultellus Hoy, 1959
90. Eriococcus curassavicus Reyne, 1964
91. Eriococcus cynodontis Kiritchenko, 1940
92. Eriococcus cypraeaeformis Fuller, 1897
93. Eriococcus dacrydii Hoy, 1962
94. Eriococcus danthoniae Maskell, 1891
95. Eriococcus danzigae (Miller & Gimpel, 1996)
96. Eriococcus davidsoni (Miller & Miller, 1993)
97. Eriococcus deformis Wang, 1974
98. Eriococcus dennoi (Miller & Miller, 1993)
99. Eriococcus desertus (Matesova, 1957)
100. Eriococcus detectus Hoy, 1962
101. Eriococcus devoniensis (Green, 1896)
102. Eriococcus diaboli Ferris, 1955
103. Eriococcus diversispinus Leonardi, 1911
104. Eriococcus dombeyae Gonzalez
105. Eriococcus droserae (Miller, Liu & Howell, 1992)
106. Eriococcus dubius Cockerell, 1896
107. Eriococcus elaeocarpi Hoy, 1962
108. Eriococcus elegans Fuller, 1897
109. Eriococcus elytranthae Hoy, 1962
110. Eriococcus emirnensis Mamet, 1954
111. Eriococcus epacrotrichus (Miller & Miller, 1992)
112. Eriococcus ericae Signoret, 1875
113. Eriococcus erinaceus Kiritchenko, 1940
114. Eriococcus eriogoni Ehrhorn, 1911
115. Eriococcus erwini (Kozár, 1996)
116. Eriococcus etbaicus De Lotto, 1954
117. Eriococcus eucalypti Maskell, 1892
118. Eriococcus euphorbiae Ferris, 1955
119. Eriococcus eurythrix Miller & González, 1975
120. Eriococcus evelinae (Kozár, 1983)
121. Eriococcus fagicorticis Maskell, 1892
122. Eriococcus festucarum Lindinger, 1932
123. Eriococcus formicicola Newstead, 1897
124. Eriococcus fossilis Froggatt, 1933
125. Eriococcus fossor (Maskell, 1884)
126. Eriococcus franceschinii Balachowsky, 1934
127. Eriococcus froebeae (Miller, 1991)
128. Eriococcus fuligitectus Hoy, 1962
129. Eriococcus gassinus Goux, 1992
130. Eriococcus gaultheriae Hoy, 1962
131. Eriococcus gerbergi McDaniel, 1959
132. Eriococcus gibbus Hoy, 1959
133. Eriococcus glanduliferus Balachowsky, 1933
134. Eriococcus glyceriae Green, 1921
135. Eriococcus gouxi (Balachowsky, 1954)
136. Eriococcus gracilispinus (Borchsenius & Matesova, 1955)
137. Eriococcus graminis Maskell, 1897
138. Eriococcus grandis Hoy, 1963
139. Eriococcus granulatus Green, 1931
140. Eriococcus greeni Newstead, 1898
141. Eriococcus guesinus Goux, 1992
142. Eriococcus gurneyi Fuller, 1899
143. Eriococcus hakeae Fuller, 1897
144. Eriococcus hassanicus (Danzig, 1975)
145. Eriococcus hebes Hoy, 1962
146. Eriococcus helichrysi Goux, 1936
147. Eriococcus hellenica (Kozár, 1999)
148. Eriococcus henmii Kuwana, 1931
149. Eriococcus henryi Balachowsky, 1930
150. Eriococcus herbaceus (Danzig, 1962)
151. Eriococcus heteroacanthos Balachowsky, 1927
152. Eriococcus hispidus Hoy, 1962
153. Eriococcus howelli (Miller & Miller, 1993)
154. Eriococcus hoyi (Miller & Miller, 1992)
155. Eriococcus humatus Hoy, 1962
156. Eriococcus iljiniae (Danzig, 1972)
157. Eriococcus imperfectus Fuller, 1897
158. Eriococcus inermis Green, 1915
159. Eriococcus insignis Newstead, 1891
160. Eriococcus ironsidei Williams, 1973
161. Eriococcus irregularis Froggatt, 1921
162. Eriococcus isacanthus (Danzig, 1975)
163. Eriococcus istresianus Goux, 1989
164. Eriococcus istriensis (Kozár, 1983)
165. Eriococcus jorgenseni Morrison, 1919
166. Eriococcus kamahi Hoy, 1958
167. Eriococcus kaschgariae (Danzig, 1972)
168. Eriococcus kemptoni Parrott, 1900
169. Eriococcus kijabensis James, 1934
170. Eriococcus kondarensis (Borchsenius, 1949)
171. Eriococcus korotyaevi (Danzig, 1982)
172. Eriococcus korthalsellae Henderson, 2010
173. Eriococcus kowhai Hoy, 1962
174. Eriococcus lactucae (Borchsenius, 1949)
175. Eriococcus laeticoris (Tereznikova, 1965)
176. Eriococcus laevigatus Maskell, 1891
177. Eriococcus lagerstroemiae Kuwana, 1907
178. Eriococcus laingi (Bodenheimer, 1953)
179. Eriococcus lanatus Hempel, 1932
180. Eriococcus larreae Parrott & Cockerell, 1899
181. Eriococcus latialis Leonardi, 1907
182. Eriococcus latilobatus Hoy, 1962
183. Eriococcus lecanioides (Green, 1915)
184. Eriococcus leguminicola Morrison, 1919
185. Eriococcus leptoporus (Miller & Miller, 1993)
186. Eriococcus leptospermi Maskell, 1891
187. Eriococcus lidgetti (Cockerell, 1899)
188. Eriococcus mackenziei (Miller & Miller, 1992)
189. Eriococcus macrobactrus (Miller & Miller, 1992)
190. Eriococcus madeirensis Balachowsky, 1939
191. Eriococcus mancus (Maskell, 1897)
192. Eriococcus marginalis (Borchsenius, 1949)
193. Eriococcus maskelli Hoy, 1962
194. Eriococcus matai Hoy, 1962
195. Eriococcus matesovae (Miller & Gimpel, 1996)
196. Eriococcus megaporus (Miller & Miller, 1993)
197. Eriococcus mendozae Morrison, 1919
198. Eriococcus meridianus Hoy, 1962
199. Eriococcus mesotrichus (Miller & Miller, 1993)
200. Eriococcus micracanthus (Danzig, 1975)
201. Eriococcus microtrichus (Miller & Miller, 1992)
202. Eriococcus millei Williams, 2007
203. Eriococcus milleri Hoy, 1959
204. Eriococcus mimus Hoy, 1962
205. Eriococcus minimus (Tang, 1988)
206. Eriococcus miscanthi Takahashi, 1957
207. Eriococcus missourii Hollinger, 1917
208. Eriococcus monotrichus (Miller & Miller, 1993)
209. Eriococcus montanus Hoy, 1962
210. Eriococcus montifagi Hoy, 1962
211. Eriococcus multispinatus (Tang & Hao, 1995)
212. Eriococcus multispinosus (Kuhlgatz, 1898)
213. Eriococcus multispinus (Maskell, 1879)
214. Eriococcus mumtazi Bodenheimer, 1943
215. Eriococcus munroi (Boratynski, 1962)
216. Eriococcus myrsinae Hoy, 1962
217. Eriococcus navarinoensis Hoy, 1962
218. Eriococcus nelsonensis Hoy, 1962
219. Eriococcus nematosphaerus Hu, Xie & Yan, 1981
220. Eriococcus neomyrti Hoy, 1962
221. Eriococcus ningxianensis Tang & Hao, 1995
222. Eriococcus nitidulus Hoy, 1962
223. Eriococcus notabilis (Borchsenius, 1949)
224. Eriococcus nothofagi Hoy, 1962
225. Eriococcus nudulus (Ferris, 1955)
226. Eriococcus nuerae Green, 1922
227. Eriococcus oblongus (Borchsenius, 1949)
228. Eriococcus oligacanthus (Danzig, 1972)
229. Eriococcus oligotrichus (Miller & Miller, 1993)
230. Eriococcus onukii Kuwana, 1902
231. Eriococcus ophius (Miller & Miller, 1993)
232. Eriococcus orariensis Hoy, 1954
233. Eriococcus orbiculus (Matesova, 1960)
234. Eriococcus orientalis (Borchsenius, 1956)
235. Eriococcus osbeckiae Green, 1922
236. Eriococcus oxyacanthus (Danzig, 1975)
237. Eriococcus pallidus Maskell, 1885
238. Eriococcus palmeri Cockerell, 1899
239. Eriococcus palustris Dodds, 1923
240. Eriococcus pamiricus (Bazarov, 1968)
241. Eriococcus papillosus Morrison, 1924
242. Eriococcus parabilis Hoy, 1962
243. Eriococcus parsonsiae Henderson, 2006
244. Eriococcus parvisetus (Lindinger, 1957)
245. Eriococcus parvulus Hoy, 1962
246. Eriococcus paucispinus Ferris, 1921
247. Eriococcus perplexus Hempel, 1900
248. Eriococcus philippinensis (Morrison, 1920)
249. Eriococcus phyllocladi Maskell, 1892
250. Eriococcus picta Froggatt, 1916
251. Eriococcus pimeliae Hoy, 1962
252. Eriococcus piptandeniae Hempel, 1937
253. Eriococcus pittospori Ferris, 1955
254. Eriococcus placidus Green, 1921
255. Eriococcus podhalensis Dziedzicka & Koteja, 1985
256. Eriococcus podocarpi Hoy, 1962
257. Eriococcus pohutukawa Hoy, 1958
258. Eriococcus popayanensis Balachowsky, 1959
259. Eriococcus populi (Matesova, 1967)
260. Eriococcus pseudinsignis Green, 1921
261. Eriococcus pumiliae Gonzalez
262. Eriococcus pustulatus (Maskell, 1893)
263. Eriococcus puymorensis Goux, 1992
264. Eriococcus quercus (Comstock, 1881)
265. Eriococcus raithbyi Maskell, 1890
266. Eriococcus rata Hoy, 1958
267. Eriococcus reynei Schmutterer, 1952
268. Eriococcus rhadinothrix Miller & González, 1975
269. Eriococcus rhodomyrti Green, 1922
270. Eriococcus ribesiae (Borchsenius, 1960)
271. Eriococcus roboris Goux, 1931
272. Eriococcus rosaceus Balachowsky, 1932
273. Eriococcus rosannae Tranfaglia & Esposito, 1985
274. Eriococcus rotundus Hoy, 1962
275. Eriococcus rubrifagi Hoy, 1962
276. Eriococcus rubrus (Matesova, 1960)
277. Eriococcus rugosus Froggatt, 1933
278. Eriococcus rusapiensis Hall, 1937
279. Eriococcus saboteneus Kuwana & Tanaka, 1922
280. Eriococcus sachalinensis Siraiwa, 1939
281. Eriococcus salarius Ferris, 1955
282. Eriococcus salicicola (Borchsenius, 1949)
283. Eriococcus salicis Borchsenius, 1938
284. Eriococcus salsolae (Borchsenius, 1949)
285. Eriococcus sanguinairensis Goux, 1993
286. Eriococcus sasae (Danzig, 1975)
287. Eriococcus saxatilis Kiritchenko, 1940
288. Eriococcus saxidesertus (Borchsenius, 1949)
289. Eriococcus serratilobis Green, 1915
290. Eriococcus setulosus Hoy, 1962
291. Eriococcus shiraiwai Kuwana & Muramatsu, 1931
292. Eriococcus siakwanensis (Borchsenius, 1960)
293. Eriococcus simplex Maskell, 1897
294. Eriococcus smithi Lobdell, 1929
295. Eriococcus socialis Goux, 1931
296. Eriococcus sojae Kuwana, 1917
297. Eriococcus sophorae Green, 1929
298. Eriococcus sordidus (Green, 1904)
299. Eriococcus spiniferus (Borchsenius, 1949)
300. Eriococcus spiniger Maskell, 1896
301. Eriococcus spiraeae (Borchsenius, 1949)
302. Eriococcus spurius (Modeer, 1778)
303. Eriococcus stauroporus (Miller & Miller, 1992)
304. Eriococcus stellatus McDaniel, 1963
305. Eriococcus stenoclini Mamet, 1950
306. Eriococcus subterraneus (Borchsenius, 1949)
307. Eriococcus sutepensis Takahashi, 1942
308. Eriococcus syncarpiae (Froggatt, 1915)
309. Eriococcus szentivanyi Kozar & Williams
310. Eriococcus targassonensis Goux, 1993
311. Eriococcus tavignani Goux, 1991
312. Eriococcus tenuis Green, 1922
313. Eriococcus tepperi Maskell, 1892
314. Eriococcus tesselatus Froggatt, 1916
315. Eriococcus teucriicolus Bodenheimer, 1943
316. Eriococcus texanus King, 1902
317. Eriococcus tholothrix Miller & González, 1975
318. Eriococcus thymelaeae Newstead, 1897
319. Eriococcus thymi (Schrank, 1801)
320. Eriococcus tillandsiae Ferris, 1921
321. Eriococcus timidus Hulden, 1985
322. Eriococcus tinsleyi Cockerell, 1898
323. Eriococcus tokaedae Kuwana, 1932
324. Eriococcus tosotrichus (Miller & Miller, 1993)
325. Eriococcus tounetae Goux, 1995
326. Eriococcus transversus Green, 1922
327. Eriococcus tricarinatus Fuller, 1897
328. Eriococcus tripartitus (Fuller, 1897)
329. Eriococcus trispinatus Wang, 1974
330. Eriococcus tucurincae Laing, 1929
331. Eriococcus turanicus (Matesova, 1967)
332. Eriococcus turkmenicus Archangelskaya, 1930
333. Eriococcus ulmarius (Danzig, 1975)
334. Eriococcus uvaeursi (Linnaeus, 1761)
335. Eriococcus valenzuelae Balachowsky, 1959
336. Eriococcus variabilis Goux, 1940
337. Eriococcus veyrensis Goux, 1991
338. Eriococcus villosus Froggatt, 1916
339. Eriococcus wangi (Miller & Gimpel, 1996)
340. Eriococcus washingtonensis (Miller & Miller, 1992)
341. Eriococcus whiteheadi (Miller, 1991)
342. Eriococcus williamsi Danzig, 1987
343. Eriococcus zernae (Tereznikova, 1977)
344. Eriococcus zygophylli Archangelskaya, 1931
