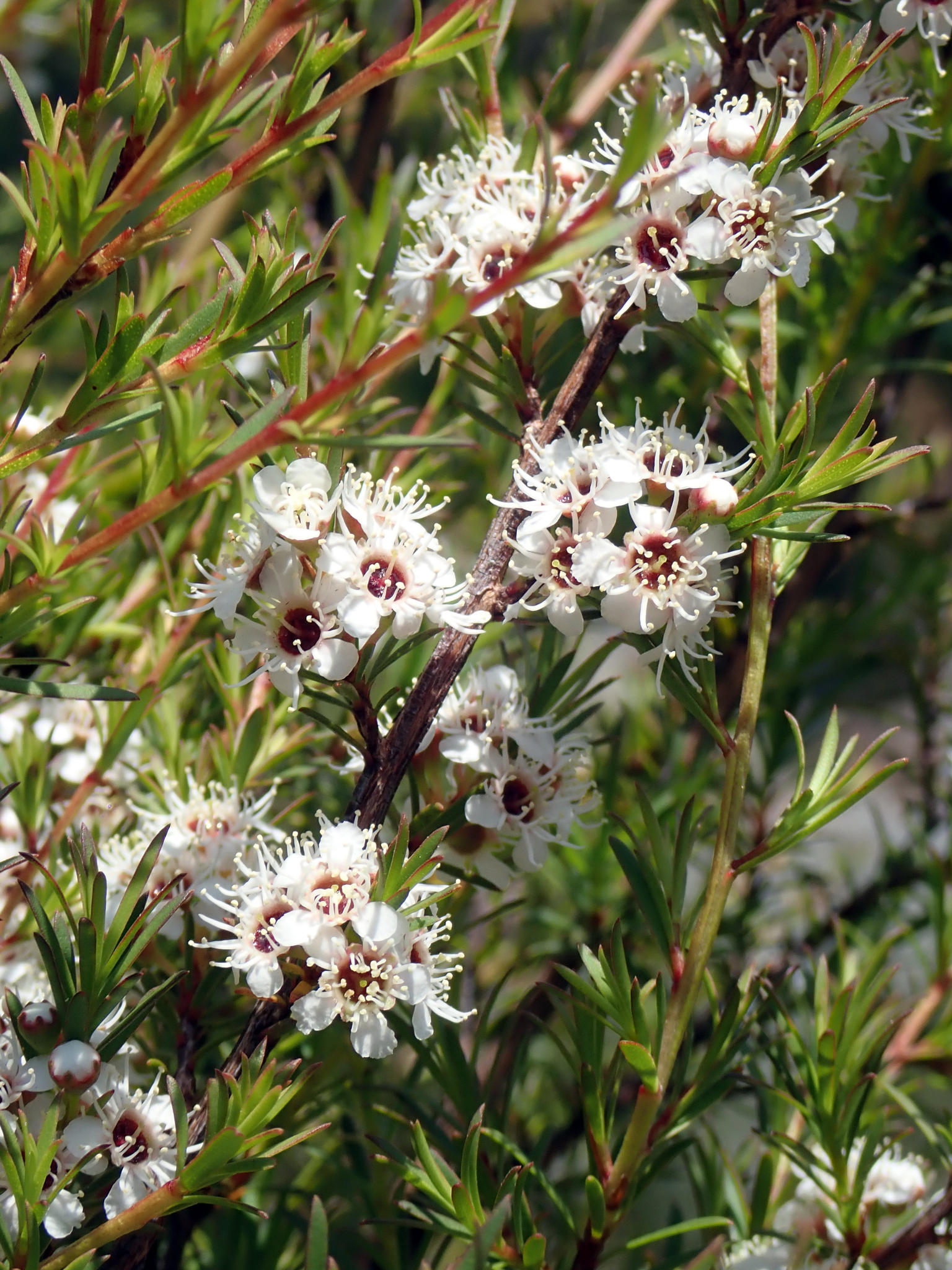
- Inflorescences of kānuka

Conservation status
- Near Threatened (IUCN 3.1)

- Not Threatened (NZ TCS)

Scientific classification
- Kingdom: Plantae
- Clade: Tracheophytes
- Clade: Angiosperms
- Clade: Eudicots
- Clade: Rosids
- Order: Myrtales
- Family: Myrtaceae
- Genus: Kunzea
- Species: K. ericoides

Binomial name
- Kunzea ericoides (A.Rich.) Joy Thomps.

Synonyms
- Leptospermum ericoides A.Rich.

= Kunzea ericoides =

Species of shrub endemic to New Zealand

Kunzea ericoides, commonly known as kānuka or white tea-tree, is a tree or shrub in the myrtle family, Myrtaceae and is endemic to Aotearoa New Zealand. It has white or pink flowers similar to those of Leptospermum and from its first formal description in 1832 until 1983 was known as Leptospermum ericoides. The flowers have five petals and up to 25 stamens which are mostly longer than the petals.

== Description ==
Kunzea ericoides is a spreading shrub or tree, sometimes growing to a height of 18 m (60 ft) with bark which peels in long strips and young branches which tend to droop. The leaves are variable in shape from linear to narrow elliptic or lance-shaped, 6.5–25 mm (0.3–1 in) long and 1–5 mm (0.04–0.2 in) wide with a petiole up to 1 mm (0.04 in) long. The flowers are white or pale pink, crowded on side branches or in the axils of upper leaves. The floral cup is covered with soft, downy hairs and is on a pedicel 3–6 mm (0.1–0.2 in) long. There are five triangular sepals about 1 mm (0.04 in) long and five petals about 2 mm (0.08 in) long. There are up to 25 stamens which are 1–4 mm (0.04–0.2 in), mostly longer than the petals. Flowering occurs between October and February and is followed by fruit which is a cup-shaped capsule 2–4 mm (0.08–0.2 in) long and wide. The capsule usually opens to release its seed when mature.

Kunzea ericoides is very similar to the Australian endemics K. leptospermoides and K. peduncularis which were formerly included in K. ericoides. The new status of K. ericoides follows the publication of a paper entitled "A revision of the New Zealand Kunzea ericoides (Myrtaceae) complex" by the New Zealand botanist Peter de Lange.

== Taxonomy ==
Kānuka was first formally described in 1832 by the French botanist Achille Richard who gave it the name Leptospermum ericoides from a specimen he collected in Aotearoa New Zealand. The description was published in Voyage de découvertes de l'Astrolabe - Botanique. In 1983, Australian botanist Joy Thompson changed the scientific name to Kunzea ericoides, describing the differences between Leptospermum and Kunzea in Telopea. The specific epithet (ericoides) refers to the similarity of the habit of this species to that of Erica arborea. The suffix -oides is a Latin ending meaning "likeness". The taxonomic revision of the Kunzea ericoides complex identified ten species endemic to New Zealand, seven of which were new at this time. An analysis in 2021 of the Kunzea complex observed little genetic variation and morphological distinction between the species, questioning the evidence for ten endemic Kunzea species and suggesting further revision. This was further supported in 2023 by additional genomic evidence suggesting that the complex may in fact be a single widespread species with north to south morphological variation following a geographic cline.

=== Etymology ===
Common names for this species include: kānuka, kōpuka, manuea, mānuka, mānuka-rauriki, mārū, rauiri, rauwiri, white tea tree, and tree manuka.

Kānuka can also refer to Kunzea robusta, it is a doublet of mānuka from Proto-Polynesian nukanuka or nuka which originally refers to Decaspermum fruticosum due to its similar small white flowers.

== Distribution ==
Kānuka (or mānuka, as it was mostly known until the 1930s) is only known from the north of the South Island. It is found north of the Buller and Wairau Rivers, and is most common near Nelson. It mostly grows in shrubland and forest in coastal and lowland areas, rarely in subalpine shrubland.

Members of the kānuka complex are found throughout New Zealand occurring on the Three Kings Islands, Aotea (Great Barrier Island), from Te Paki (on the Aupōuri Peninsula) at the northern tip of the North Island to as far south as Dunedin and Central Otago in the South Island, and Stewart Island. Within this range kānuka is widespread ranging from coastal scrub and sand dunes (where it may form a distinct forest type) through lowland and montane forest, with one member of the complex reaching elevations of 2000 metres above sea level.

== Ecology ==
Kānuka often colonizes land recovering after a fire and is a critical part of the natural recovery of agricultural areas and open disturbed ground to forest. With its small but abundant flowers it can colour a whole hillside white, almost giving the appearance of snow cover. The wood is very hard and although not durable in the ground it is used for wharf piles and tool handles. It is particularly popular as firewood, and burns with a great heat.

Kānuka can grow to around 10 metres high. Kākāriki parakeets (Cyanoramphus) use the leaves and bark of kānuka and the related mānuka tea trees to rid themselves of parasites. Apart from ingesting the material, they also chew it, mix it with preen gland oil and apply it to their feathers. Mānuka and kānuka are superficially similar species and are often confused with one another. The easiest way to tell the difference between them is to feel the foliage, kānuka leaves being soft, while mānuka leaves are prickly. K. ericoides may occur in the understory of certain rimu/nothofagus forests in the South Island. Typical associate understory species may include crown fern (Lomaria discolor) and Cyathodes fasciculata.

== Prostrate kānuka ==
A variety of kānuka, the prostrate kānuka (Kunzea ericoides var. microflora), is one of the few plants that can survive hot ground in the immediate surroundings of geothermal features such as fumaroles and craters, for instance at "Craters of the Moon" (Karapiti), a geothermal area close to Taupō, New Zealand.

== See also ==
- Eriococcus orariensis, a scale insect that feeds on it
- Kānuka Hills, a range in New Zealand named after it
