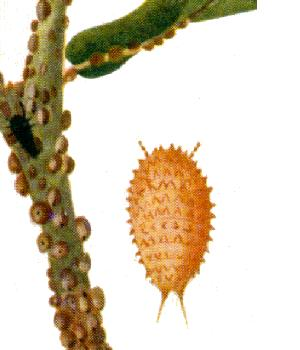
- Eriococcus coriaceus, the gumtree scale

Scientific classification
- Kingdom: Animalia
- Phylum: Arthropoda
- Class: Insecta
- Order: Hemiptera
- Suborder: Sternorrhyncha
- Family: Eriococcidae
- Genus: Eriococcus
- Species: E. coriaceus

Binomial name
- Eriococcus coriaceus Maskell, 1893

= Eriococcus coriaceus =

Species of true bug

Eriococcus coriaceus is a scale insect of the genus Eriococcus. Its common names include blue gum scale, gum-tree scale and common gum scale. It lives mostly on species from the Eucalyptus genus.
