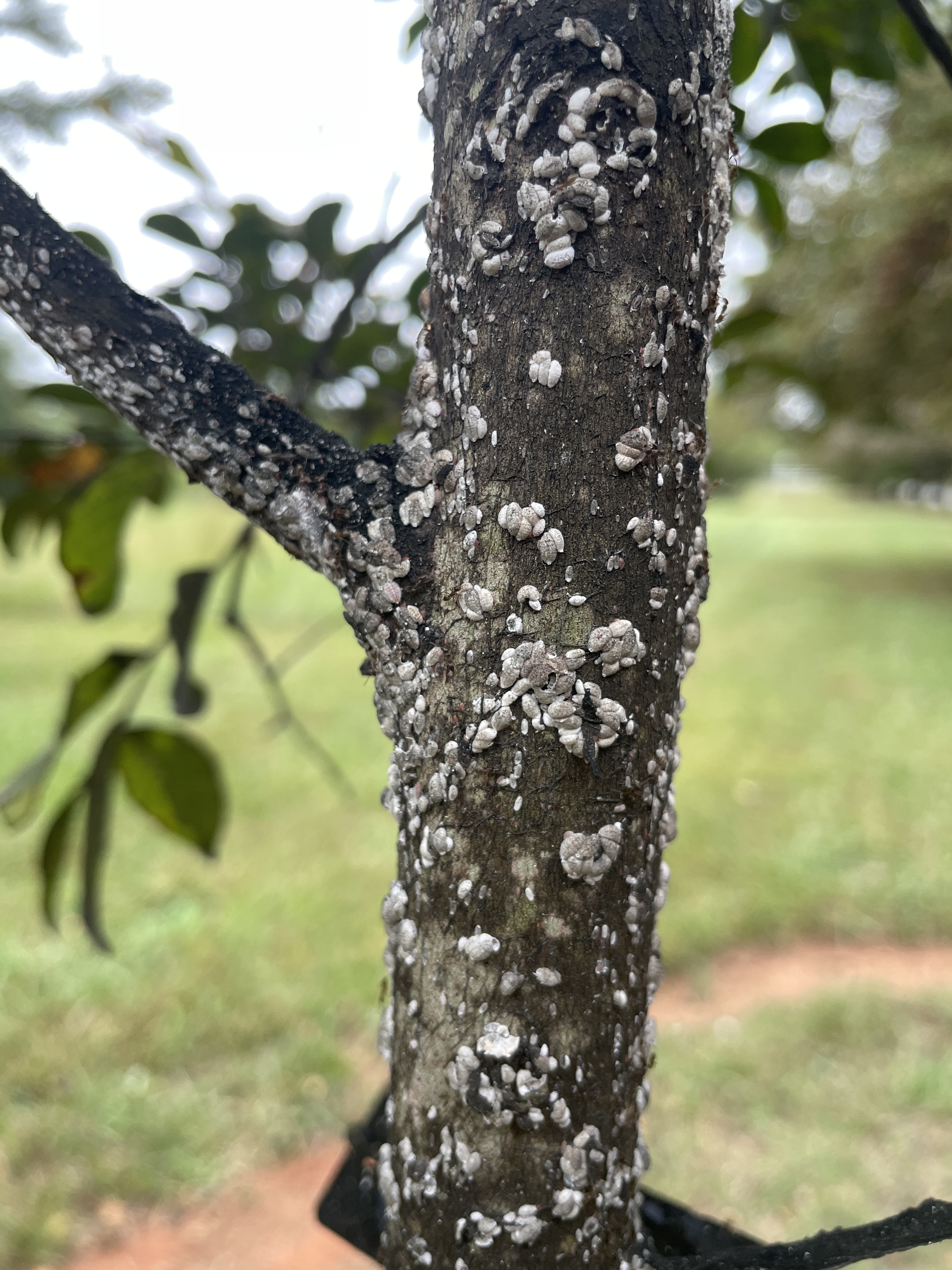
- Crapemyrtle Bark Scale

Scientific classification
- Kingdom: Animalia
- Phylum: Arthropoda
- Class: Insecta
- Order: Hemiptera
- Suborder: Sternorrhyncha
- Family: Eriococcidae
- Genus: Acanthococcus; Targioni Tozzetti, 1868

= Acanthococcus (bug) =

Genus of insects

Acanthococcus is a genus of scale insects belonging to the family Eriococcidae.

The species of this genus are found in Southern America.

Species:

- Acanthococcus aceris Signoret, 1875
- Acanthococcus adenostomae Ehrhorn
- Acanthococcus diversispinus
- Acanthococcus gracielae
- Acanthococcus haywardi
- Acanthococcus podhalensis (Dziedzicka & Koteja, 1971)
- Acanthococcus punctatae
- Acanthococcus riojensis
- Acanthococcus siambonensis
