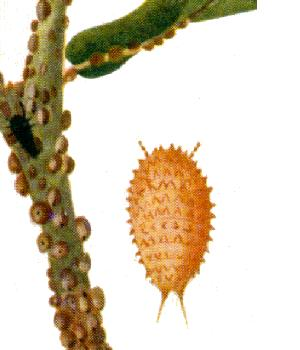
- Eriococcus coriaceus the gumtree scale

Scientific classification
- Kingdom: Animalia
- Phylum: Arthropoda
- Clade: Pancrustacea
- Class: Insecta
- Order: Hemiptera
- Suborder: Sternorrhyncha
- Superfamily: Coccoidea
- Family: Eriococcidae

Genera
- See text

= Eriococcidae =

Family of true bugs

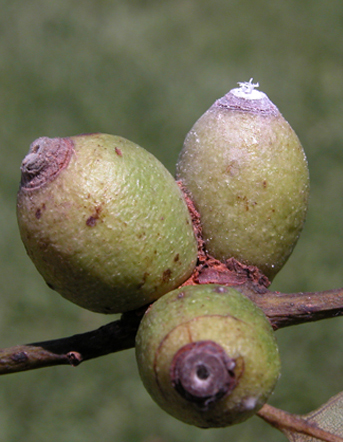
Galls formed by Apiomorpha conica

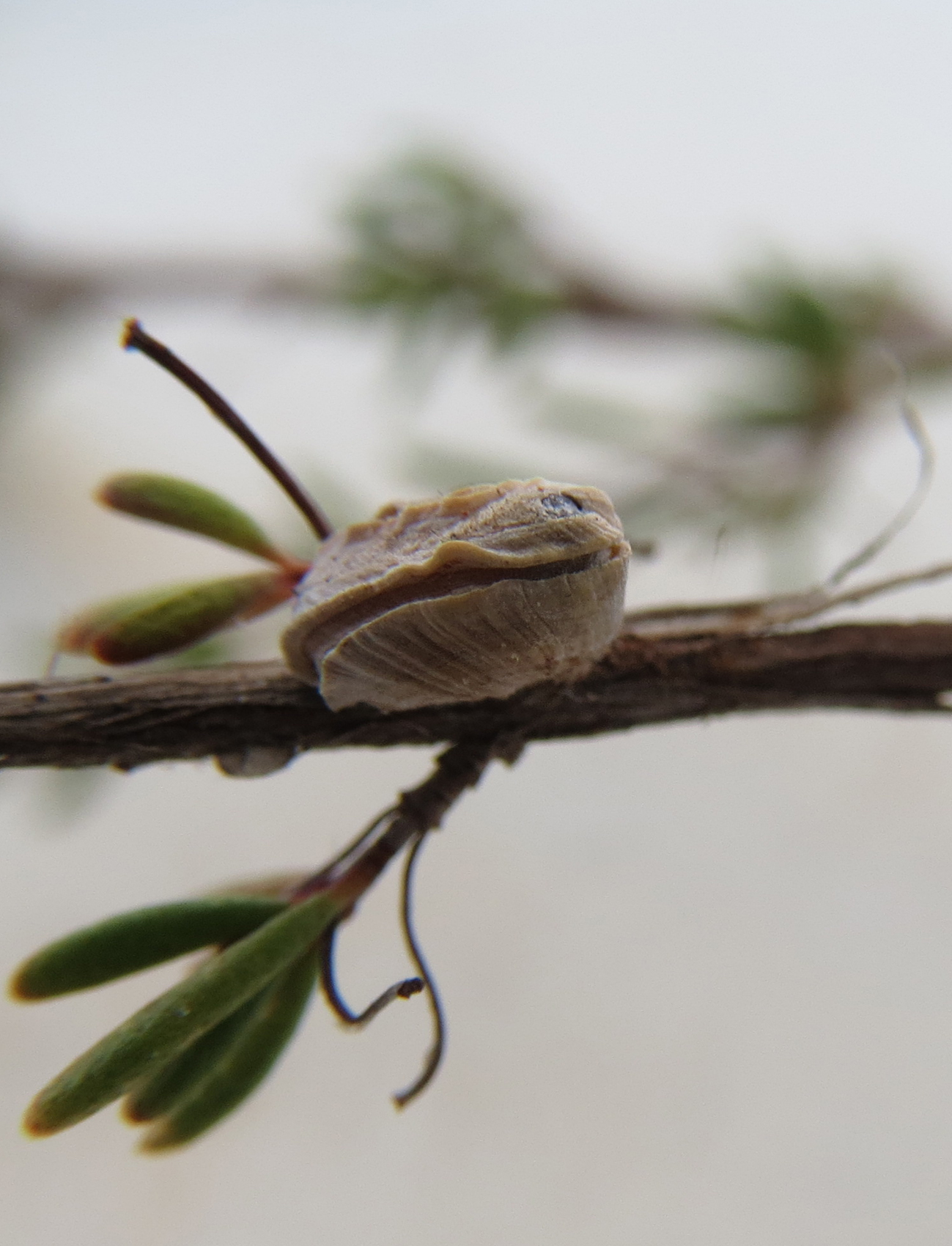
Adult female of Callococcus pulchellus

Eriococcidae is a family of scale insects in the order Hemiptera. They are commonly known as felt scales or eriococcids. As of 2023, there are 109 genera and 681 species. Each species is usually specific to a different plant host, or closely related group of hosts.

Recent research using ribosomal DNA has shown that the family Eriococcidae is not a single monophyletic group but is an aggregation of several different groups. Some species that appear morphologically similar seem to be only distantly related while dissimilar species are sometimes more closely related. The type genus Eriococcus has been shown to be polyphyletic.

== Description ==
Adult females of many felt scales produce a white, yellowish or gray membranous capsule or ovisac that encloses the pyriform (pear-shaped) body. The body itself varies in colour and may be pink, red or purple, green or brown. The posterior end of the sac has a small opening that allows newly hatched nymphs to emerge. Some species occur under the bark of the host plant and produce little or no ovisac secretion. The bodies of these are often pink or red.

== Life cycle ==
Adult females of Eriococcidae usually lay 50-100 eggs. These hatch into first-instar nymphs that emerge from the female's ovisac. The first-instar nymphs develop into second-instar nymphs. From here on, development diverges for females and males:

- Females then develop to adults, so there are three post-egg stages in total.
- Male second-instar nymphs feed for a short period, then produce a narrow, felt sac around the body. In this sac they develop through the stages of prepupa and pupa to adulthood. Males thus have five post-egg stages in total.

Adult females move around for a short period of time until they find a suitable place to feed, then settle down. The mobile adult males move around to find females to mate with.

== Biology ==
Eriococcidae are herbivores, like other scale insects. They occur on various hosts including trees, shrubs and grasses, and on most plant parts.

Many species produce galls, including Apiomorpha which feed on various species of eucalypt and have a complex life cycle. Species in this genus can produce separate male galls that are induced on existing female galls.

Some species are tree pests in North America, including: European elm scale, azalea bark scale, oak eriococcin, crape myrtle bark scale, beech scale.

== Genera ==
- Acalyptococcus
- Acanthococcus
- Aculeococcus
- Affeldococcus
- Alpinococcus
- Apezococcus
- Apiococcus
- Apiomorpha
- Ascelis
- Atriplicia
- Balticococcus
- Borchseniococcus
- Bryococcus
- Callococcus
- Calycicoccus
- Capulinia
- Carpochloroides
- Chazeauana
- Chilechiton
- Chilecoccus
- Cornoculus
- Cryptococcus
- Cylindrococcus
- Cystococcus
- Eremococcus
- Eriochiton
- Eriococcus
- Erium
- Exallococcus
- Gedanicoccus
- Gossypariella
- Greenoripersia
- Hoheriococcus
- Hoyicoccus
- Icelococcus
- Intecticoccus
- Jutlandicoccus
- Kotejacoccus
- Kuenowicoccus
- Kuwanina
- Lachnodius
- Macroporicoccus
- Macracanthopyga
- Madarococcus
- Megacoccus
- Melzeria
- Montanococcus
- Neoacanthococcus
- Neoeriochiton
- Neotectococcus
- Noteococcus
- Olliffia
- Opisthoscelis
- Orafortis
- Oregmopyga
- Ourococcus
- Ovaticoccus
- Pedroniopsis
- Phacelococcus
- Phloeococcus
- Proteriococcus
- Pseudocapulinia
- Pseudomontanococcus
- Pseudotectococcus
- Ripersia
- Sangicoccus
- Scutare
- Sisyrococcus
- Sphaerococcopsis
- Stegococcus
- Stibococcus
- Subcorticoccus
- Tanyscelis
- Tectococcus
- Tolypecoccus
- Xerococcus

== See also ==
- Cryptococcus fagisuga
