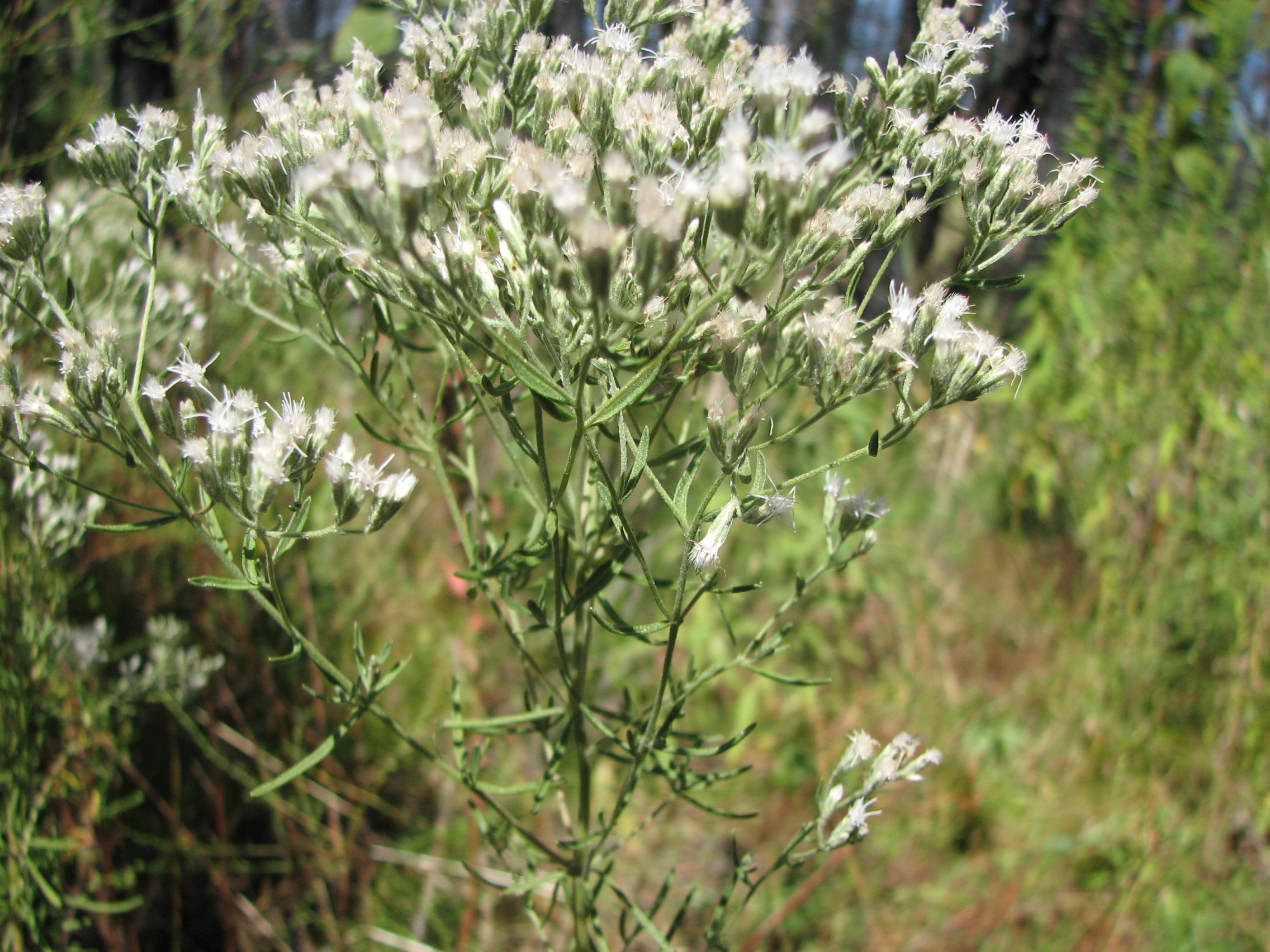
- E. hyssopifolium in bloom.

Conservation status
- Secure (NatureServe)

Scientific classification
- Kingdom: Plantae
- Clade: Embryophytes
- Clade: Tracheophytes
- Clade: Spermatophytes
- Clade: Angiosperms
- Clade: Eudicots
- Clade: Asterids
- Order: Asterales
- Family: Asteraceae
- Genus: Eupatorium
- Species: E. hyssopifolium

Binomial name
- Eupatorium hyssopifolium L.

Synonyms
- Synonymy: Eupatorium crassifolium Raf.; Eupatorium lecheifolium Greene; Eupatorium linearifolium Michx.; Eupatorium torreyanum Short ex Torr. & A.Gray; Uncasia hyssopifolia (L.) Greene; Uncasia lecheaefolia (Greene) Greene; Uncasia lecheifolia (Greene) Greene; Uncasia torreyana (Short & Peter) Greene

= Eupatorium hyssopifolium =

Species of flowering plant

Eupatorium hyssopifolium, also known as hyssopleaf thoroughwort, is a fall-blooming herbaceous plant native to North America. Like other members of the genus Eupatorium it has inflorescences containing a large number of very small flower heads, each with 5 white disc florets but no ray florets. At 0.5 to one meter (20-40 inches) tall, it is towards the shorter end of the range of heights found in Eupatorium species.

Plants which are classified as E. hyssopifolium can be either diploid or polyploid, and some of them seem to have been the result of past hybridizations with Eupatorium serotinum. Hybrids with E. album and E. linearifolium also seem to exist. The hybrid E. torreyanum is similar to E. hyssopifolium but is a hybrid of E. serotinum and Eupatorium mohrii.

Varieties

- Eupatorium hyssopifolium var. hyssopifolium - leaves 2–5 mm wide
- Eupatorium hyssopifolium var. laciniatum A.Gray - leaves 5–15 mm wide

== Distribution and habitat ==
Eupatorium hyssopifolium is found in much of the eastern and south-central United States, from Massachusetts west to Wisconsin, and as far south as Texas and Florida. Listed as endangered in the state of Ohio. It grows in moist soils and can be found in woodlands and oak savannas, pastures, fields, roadsides, and disturbed areas, over both acidic and calcareous substrates.

== Ecology ==
Eupatorium hyssopifolium increases in abundance with fire disturbance, and is most commonly found in habitats with high fire return intervals.

Eupatorium hyssopifolium is insect pollinated and is recorded to have been visited in northern Florida by Augochlorella aurata.

== Uses ==
Eupatorium hyssopifolium can be used medicinally (applied externally for insect and reptile bites). It can also be planted near crops to attract beneficial insects.
