= Eupatorium anomalum =

Scientific classification
- Kingdom: Plantae
- Clade: Tracheophytes
- Clade: Angiosperms
- Clade: Eudicots
- Clade: Asterids
- Order: Asterales
- Family: Asteraceae
- Genus: Eupatorium
- Species: E. anomalum

Binomial name
- Eupatorium anomalum Nash

Synonyms
- Eupatorium × anomalum Nash; Uncasia anomala (Nash) Greene

Species of flowering plant

Eupatorium anomalum, commonly called anomalous eupatorium or Florida thoroughwort, is a North American species in the family Asteraceae. It grows in the southeastern United States from Alabama to Virginia. Molecular investigations suggest that it originated as a hybrid between E. serotinum and E. mohrii but it is well-established on its own as a distinct species.

Eupatorium anomalum is a tall perennial sometimes over 150 cm (5 feet) tall, producing tuberous rhizomes. It has opposite, egg -shaped leaves, and flat-topped arrays of a large number of tiny flower heads. Each head has 5 white disc florets but no ray florets.
