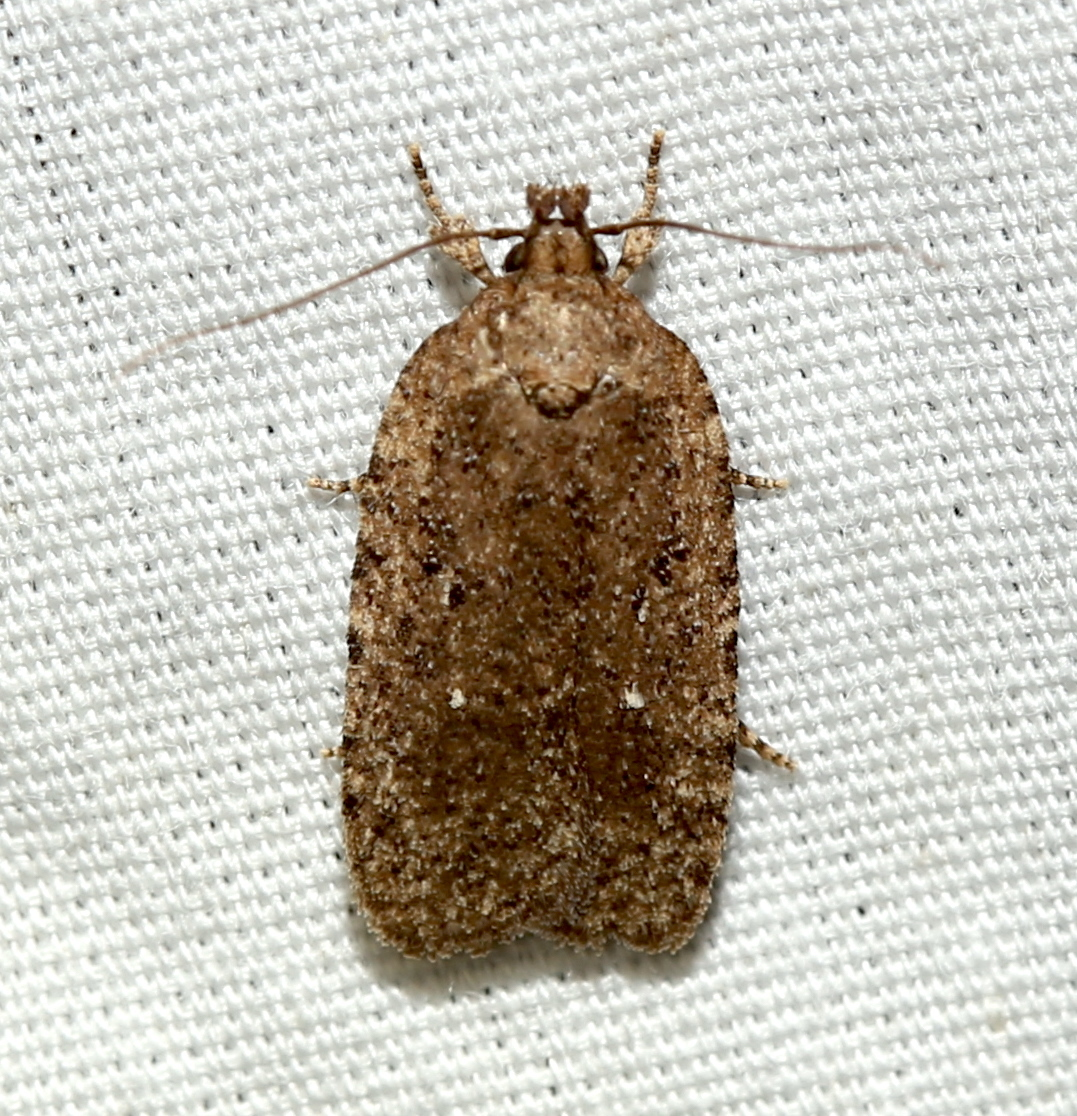

Scientific classification
- Kingdom: Animalia
- Phylum: Arthropoda
- Clade: Pancrustacea
- Class: Insecta
- Order: Lepidoptera
- Family: Depressariidae
- Genus: Agonopterix
- Species: A. eupatoriiella

Binomial name
- Agonopterix eupatoriiella (Chambers, 1878)

Synonyms
- Depressaria eupatoriiella Chambers, 1878; Agonopteryx plummerella Busck, 1908

= Agonopterix eupatoriiella =

Species of moth

Agonopterix eupatoriiella is a moth in the family Depressariidae. It was described by Vactor Tousey Chambers in 1878. It is found in North America, where it has been recorded from Illinois, Kentucky, Maryland, Michigan, Minnesota, Mississippi, Missouri, North Carolina, Ohio, Quebec, Tennessee and Wisconsin.

The wingspan is about 24 mm. The forewings are dark to fuscous grey, dusted with blackish, forming small streaks along the costa. The hindwings are pale greyish, with a faint purplish lustre.

The larvae feed on Eupatorium species, Verbesina alternifolia and Carya ovata.
