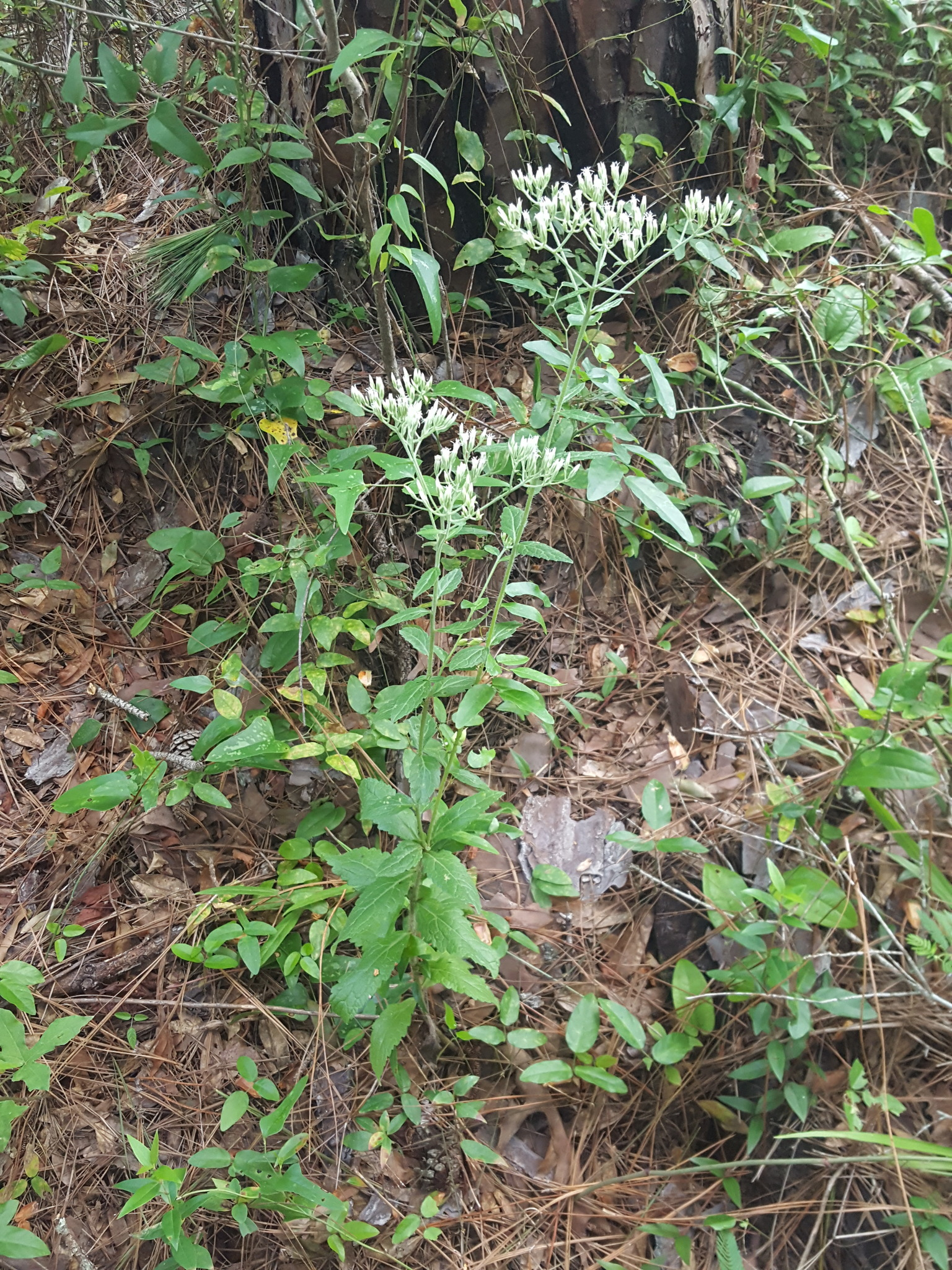

Conservation status
- Secure (NatureServe)

Scientific classification
- Kingdom: Plantae
- Clade: Tracheophytes
- Clade: Angiosperms
- Clade: Eudicots
- Clade: Asterids
- Order: Asterales
- Family: Asteraceae
- Genus: Eupatorium
- Species: E. album

Binomial name
- Eupatorium album L.

Synonyms
- Synonymy: Uncasia alba (L.) Greene; Eupatorium fernaldii R.K.Godfrey; Eupatorium glandulosum Michaux; Eupatorium petalodium Britton ex Small; Eupatorium petaloideum Britton ex Britton; Eupatorium stigmatosum Bertol. 1846 not Meyen & Walp. 1843 nor Chodat 1843; Uncasia petaloidea (Britton ex Small) Greene

= Eupatorium album =

Species of flowering plant

Eupatorium album, the white thoroughwort or snowy white eupatorium, is a herbaceous perennial plant in the family Asteraceae native from the eastern and southern United States, from eastern Texas to Connecticut, inland as far as Indiana.

As with other members of the genus Eupatorium, Eupatorium album flowers with large numbers of small white heads. The flower heads have 4-5 disc florets each, but no ray florets. It flowers from late June to October. The plant grows 50–100 cm (20–39 in) tall, making it one of the shorter Eupatorium species.

Eupatorium album is capable of hybridizing with other Eupatorium species including Eupatorium sessilifolium and Eupatorium serotinum. Its appearance is similar to Eupatorium altissimum, but differs in that the bracts (located at the base of the flower head) taper to a long point.

Eupatorium album grows in dry, open areas such as power lines, old fields, and eroded slopes. It will not grow under a shady canopy, but can be found in some open woods such as pine barrens. It is common in fire-dependent habitats, and increases in abundance in response to fire disturbance.

Varieties

- Eupatorium album var. album - most of species range
- Eupatorium album var. subvenosum A. Gray - Delaware, District of Columbia, New Jersey, New York
- Eupatorium album var. vaseyi (Porter) Cronquist - from Alabama to Pennsylvania
