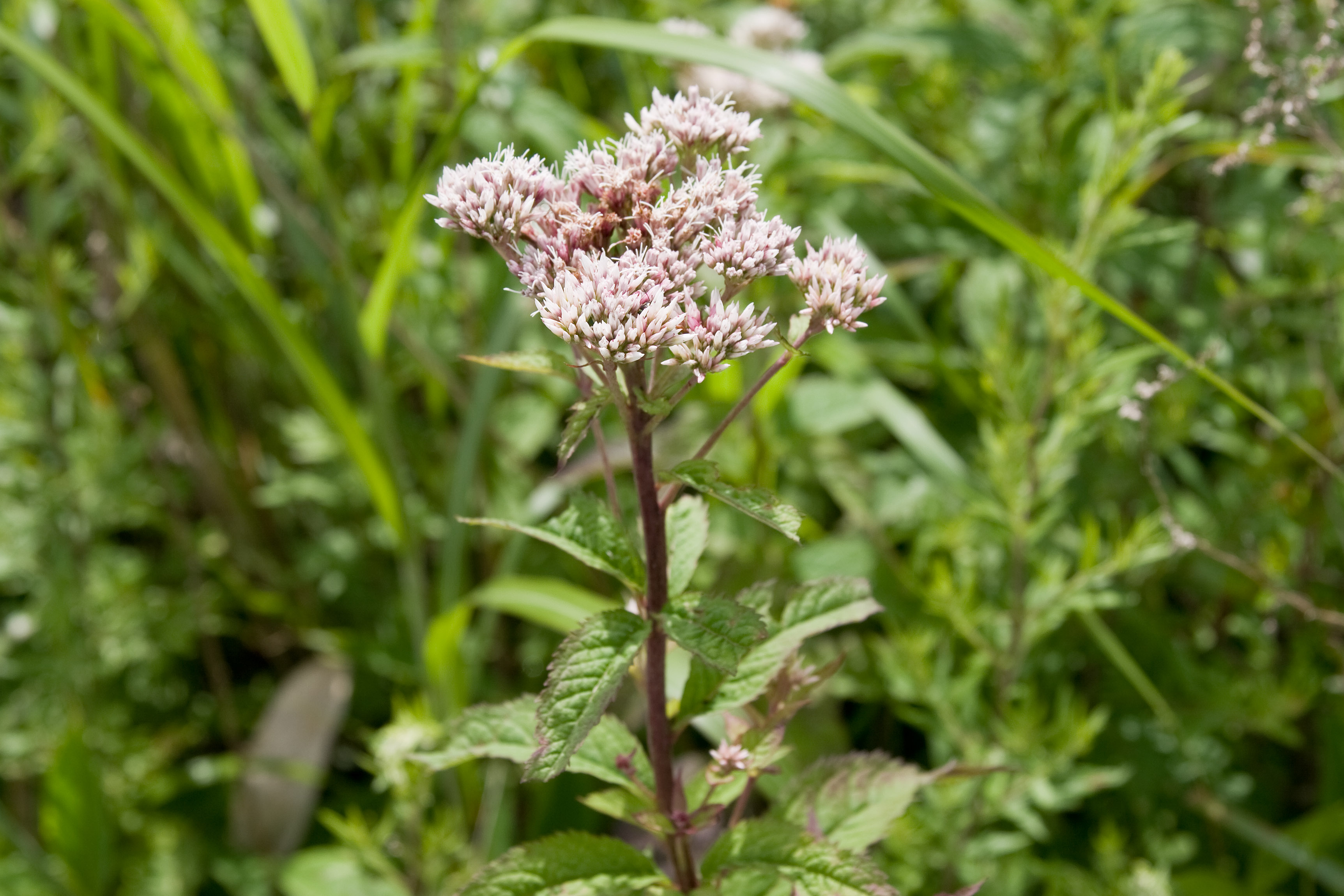

Scientific classification
- Kingdom: Plantae
- Clade: Tracheophytes
- Clade: Angiosperms
- Clade: Eudicots
- Clade: Asterids
- Order: Asterales
- Family: Asteraceae
- Genus: Eupatorium
- Species: E. chinense

Binomial name
- Eupatorium chinense L.

= Eupatorium chinense =

Species of flowering plant

Eupatorium chinense is a plant species in the family Asteraceae. The exact boundaries of this species have been defined differently by different authors. King and Robinson's 1987 paper defines it broadly, to include Eupatorium japonicum, Eupatorium makinoi, some varieties of Eupatorium fortunei, and other plants sometimes considered to be separate species.

== Toxicity ==
Eupatorium chinense contains tumorigenic pyrrolizidine alkaloids.
