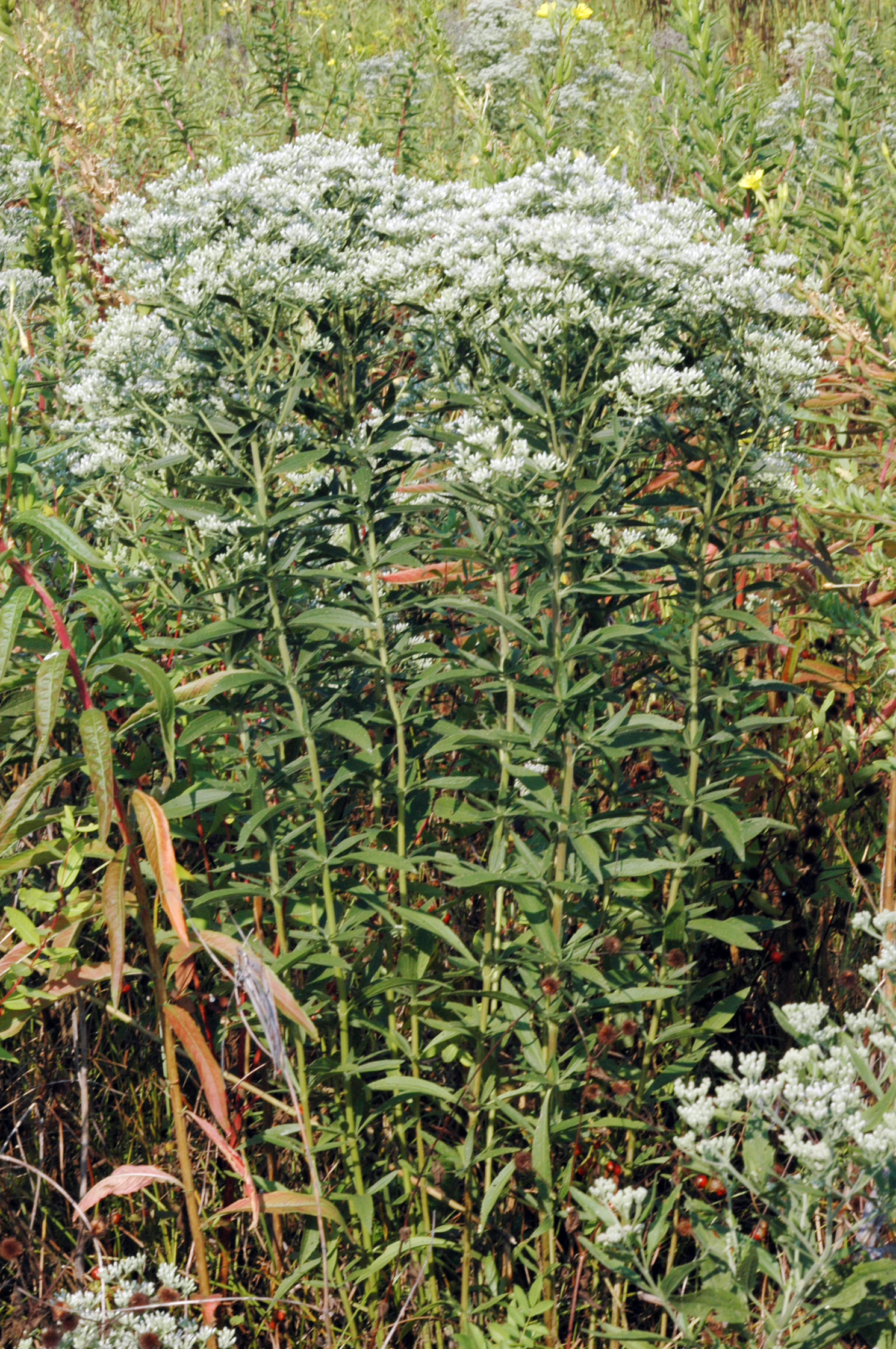

Conservation status
- Secure (NatureServe)

Scientific classification
- Kingdom: Plantae
- Clade: Tracheophytes
- Clade: Angiosperms
- Clade: Eudicots
- Clade: Asterids
- Order: Asterales
- Family: Asteraceae
- Genus: Eupatorium
- Species: E. altissimum

Binomial name
- Eupatorium altissimum L. not (L.) L.

Synonyms
- Synonymy: Eupatorium elatum Salisb. 1796, not validly published, not Steetz 1854; Eupatorium floridanum Raf. ex Torr. & A.Gray, not validly published; Eupatorium ramosum Mill.; Eupatorium rupestre Raf.; Eupatorium saltuense Fernald; Uncasia altissima (L.) Greene

= Eupatorium altissimum =

Tall thoroughwort

Species of flowering plant

Eupatorium altissimum, with the common names tall thoroughwort and tall boneset, is a perennial herbaceous plant in the Asteraceae family with a native range including much of the eastern and central United States and Canada. It is a tall plant found in open woods, prairies, fields, and waste areas, with white flowers that bloom in the late summer and fall.

== Description ==
Eupatorium altissimum is a perennial herb sometimes more than 150 cm (5 feet) tall.

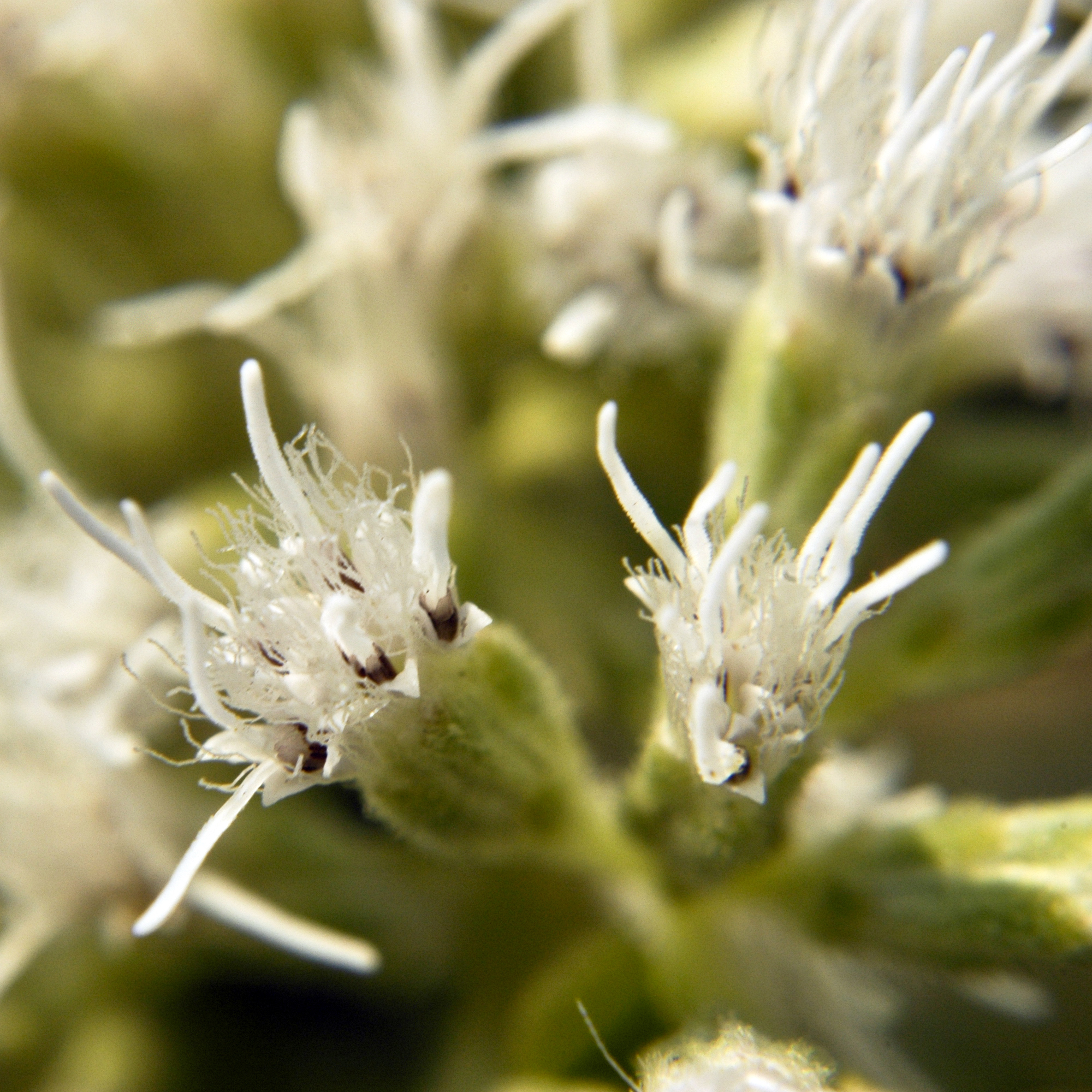
Eupatorium altissimum flower

Leaves and stems are covered with whitish hairs. Leaves are opposite on the stem and either are sessile or have very short petioles. They are narrow, 5–12 centimetres (2–5 in) long and 8–30 millimetres (0.3–1.2 in) wide. Leaves are lanceolate with 3 prominent veins underneath and teeth appearing only above the middle of the leaves.

E. altissimum produces a large number of small dull white flower heads in a large flat-topped array at the top of the plant. Each head generally has 5 disc florets but no ray florets.

The species is often confused with Brickellia eupatorioides (false boneset) because the flowers look similar and because both grow on limestone soils. However, the leaves of E. altissimum are opposite with 3 prominent veins, while the leaves of B. eupatoioides are alternate with 1 prominent vein. Also, E. altissimum flower heads consist of 5 florets, while the flower heads of B. eupatorioides have 6 to 15 florets.

== Taxonomy ==
Eupatorium altissimum is part of Eupatorium even when that genus is defined narrowly to include about 40 species of mostly white-flowered plants of North America, Asia, and Europe.

== Distribution and habitat ==
E. altissimum is native to eastern and central North America, from Ontario in the north, Nebraska in the west, Texas and the Florida Panhandle in the south, and Massachusetts in the east. It almost always grows on limestone soils in prairies, open woods, fields, and neglected areas.

== Ecology ==
The plant blooms from August to October. It attracts various pollinators and is a larval host plant for Schinia trifascia (three-lined flower moth).

It can hybridize with Eupatorium serotinum.
