= Dichomeris delotella =

Scientific classification
- Domain: Eukaryota
- Kingdom: Animalia
- Phylum: Arthropoda
- Class: Insecta
- Order: Lepidoptera
- Family: Gelechiidae
- Genus: Dichomeris
- Species: D. delotella

Binomial name
- Dichomeris delotella Busck, 1909

Synonyms
- Dichomeris mexicana Walsingham, 1911

Species of moth

Dichomeris delotella is a moth in the family Gelechiidae. It was described by August Busck in 1909. It is found in Mexico (Sonora) and the southern United States, where it has been recorded from Arizona and California.

The wingspan is 14–16 mm. The forewings are fawn-grey, speckled with fawn-ochreous, the basal fourth dull ochreous with fuscous sprinkling. There is a small black dot in the fold at one-fifth, followed by a broad triangular blackish patch arising from the dorsum and tending outward across the fold nearly to the costa but ill-defined below the fold, while more clearly defined in and above it. The costa is narrowly spotted with fuscous, alternating with pale fawn-ochreous, of which there is a slight spot on the outer fourth, followed by a series of ill-defined smaller spots of the same colour around the apex, termen, and tornus, the terminal area preceding them being somewhat clouded with fuscous. The outer half of the cell is also clouded, with a small angular whitish spot lying at its outer end. The hindwings are brownish grey, with a slender subochreous line running along the base of the cloudy brownish grey cilia. Adults are on wing from March to September in Arizona and from July to September in California.

The larvae possibly feed on Solidago and Eupatorium species.
