= E. japonicum =

E. japonicum may refer to:

- Erythronium japonicum, the katakuri, a plant species native to Japan, Korea and northeastern China
- Eupatorium japonicum, a herbaceous plant species native to China, Japan and Korea
