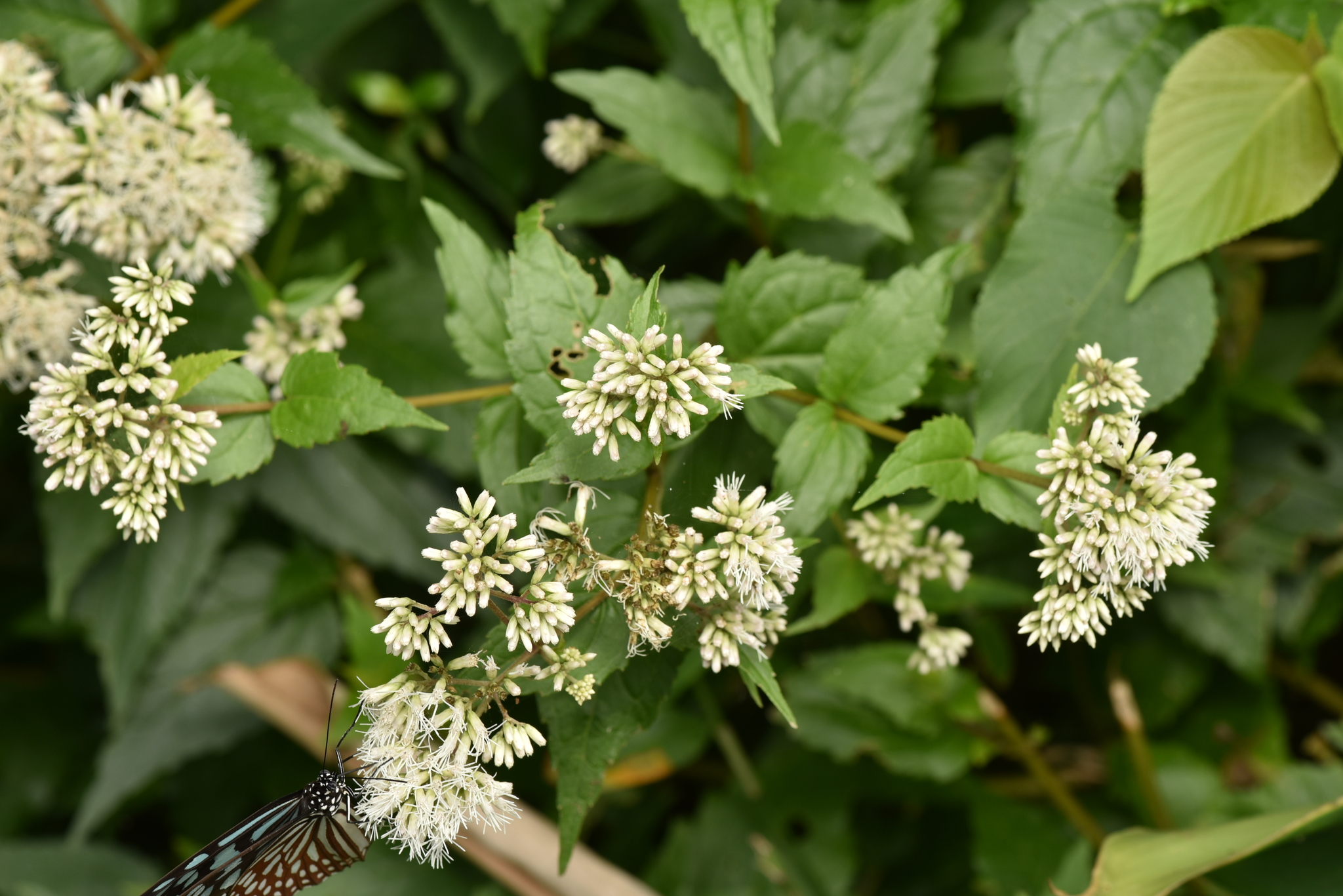

Scientific classification
- Kingdom: Plantae
- Clade: Tracheophytes
- Clade: Angiosperms
- Clade: Eudicots
- Clade: Asterids
- Order: Asterales
- Family: Asteraceae
- Genus: Eupatorium
- Species: E. tashiroi

Binomial name
- Eupatorium tashiroi Hayata

= Eupatorium tashiroi =

Species of flowering plant

Eupatorium tashiroi is a plant species in the family Asteraceae. It is endemic to Taiwan.
