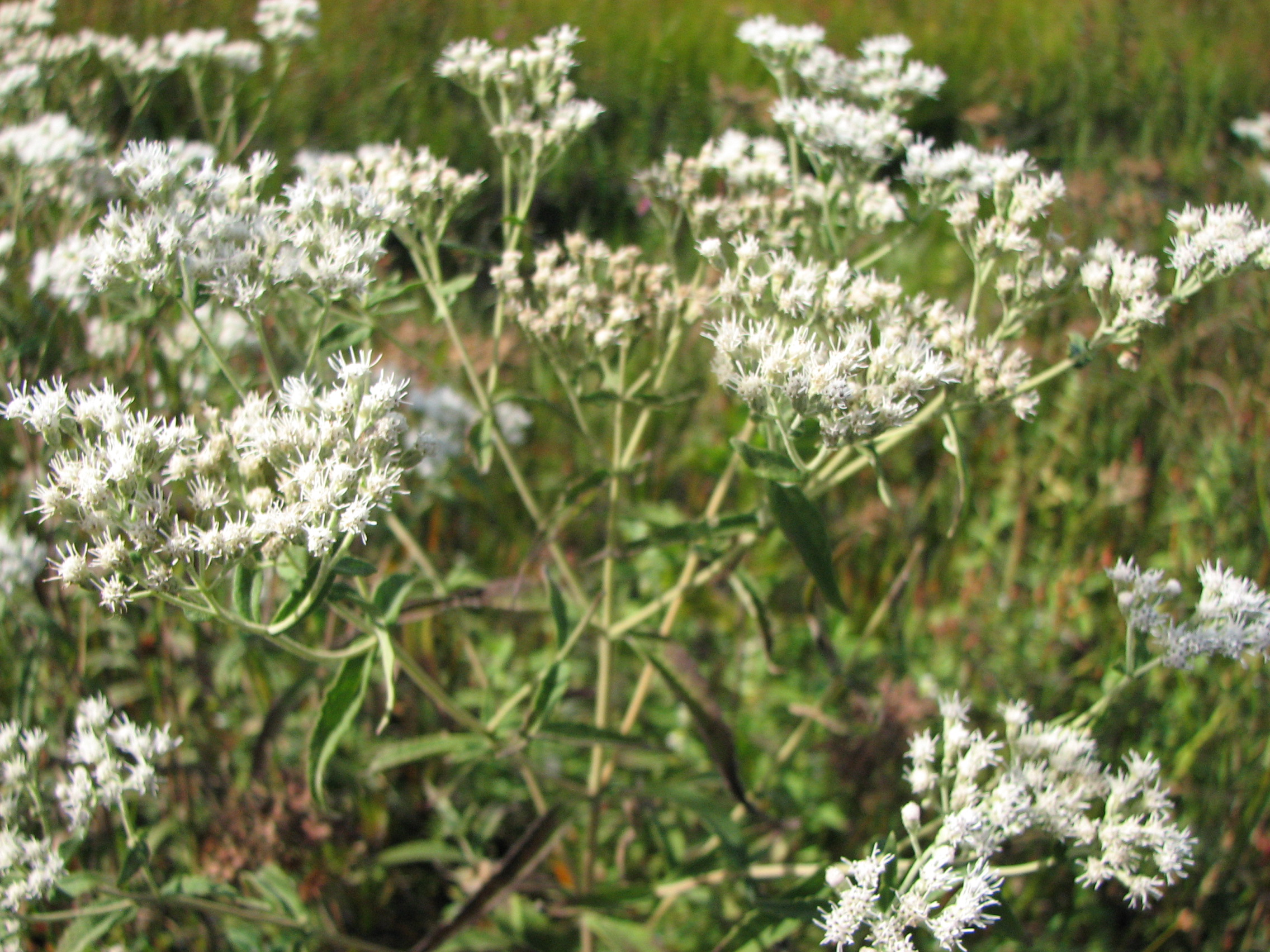
- E. resinosum in bloom.

Conservation status
- Vulnerable (NatureServe)

Scientific classification
- Kingdom: Plantae
- Clade: Tracheophytes
- Clade: Angiosperms
- Clade: Eudicots
- Clade: Asterids
- Order: Asterales
- Family: Asteraceae
- Genus: Eupatorium
- Species: E. resinosum

Binomial name
- Eupatorium resinosum Torr. ex DC. 1836 not Poepp. & Endl. 1845

Synonyms
- Uncasia resinosa (Torr.) Greene

= Eupatorium resinosum =

Pine barren thoroughwort

Species of flowering plant

Eupatorium resinosum, the pine barren thoroughwort or resinous boneset, is a rare North American plant species in the family Asteraceae.

Eupatorium resinosum is native to the eastern coastal states of the United States, though with a discontinuous distribution. Some populations grow in the Carolinas, others in New Jersey. It formerly grew in New York and Delaware, but is now apparently extirpated there. There are no reports of the species in Maryland or Virginia in between.

Eupatorium resinosum has stems up to 100 cm (40 inches) tall and produce short rhizomes. The inflorescences are composed of a large number of tiny white flower heads with 7-11 disc florets but no ray florets. This species typically grows in moist areas, areas with acidic soils, and pine barrens. It is pollinated by insects and is self-incompatible. It is rare, with only dozens of populations known, and has been extirpated from several states due to habitat destruction.
