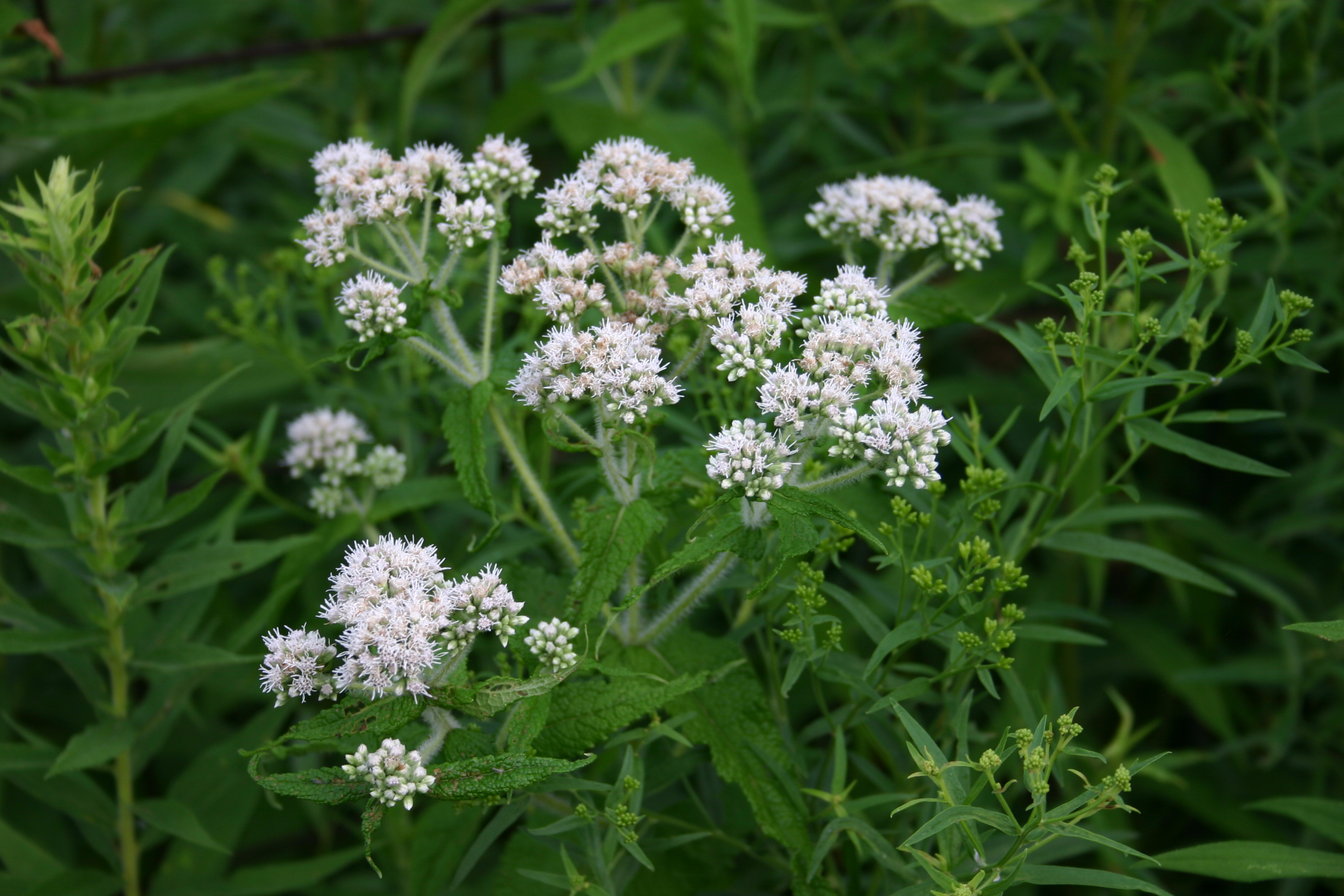

Conservation status
- Secure (NatureServe)

Scientific classification
- Kingdom: Plantae
- Clade: Tracheophytes
- Clade: Angiosperms
- Clade: Eudicots
- Clade: Asterids
- Order: Asterales
- Family: Asteraceae
- Genus: Eupatorium
- Species: E. perfoliatum

Binomial name
- Eupatorium perfoliatum L.
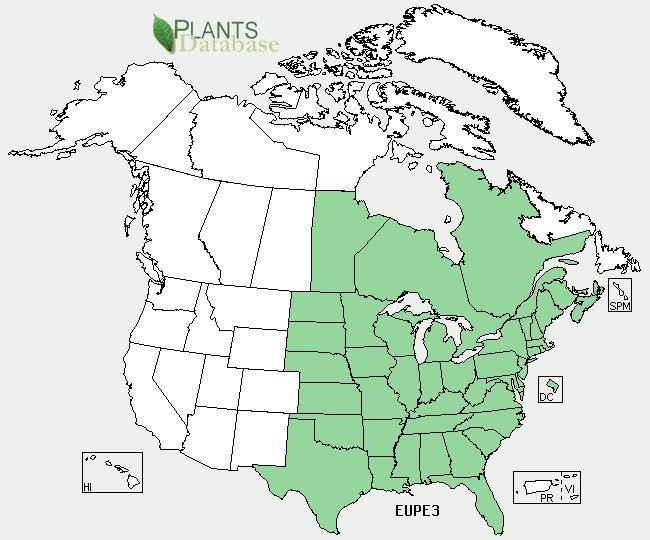

Synonyms
- Synonymy: Cunigunda perfoliata (L.) Lunell; Uncasia perfoliata (L.) Greene; Eupatorium chapmanii Small; Eupatorium connatum Michaux; Eupatorium salviifolium Sims; Eupatorium truncatum Muhl. ex Willd.; Eupatorium × truncatum Muhl. ex Willd.; Eupatorium cuneatum Engelm. ex Torr. & A.Gray; Uncasia cuneata (Engelm. ex Torr. & A.Gray) Greene; Uncasia truncata (Mühlenb. ex Willd.) Greene

= Eupatorium perfoliatum =

Species of flowering plant

Eupatorium perfoliatum, known as common boneset or just boneset, is a North American perennial plant in the family Asteraceae. It is a common native to the Eastern United States and Canada, widespread from Nova Scotia to Florida, west as far as Texas, Nebraska, the Dakotas, and Manitoba. It is also called agueweed, feverwort, or sweating-plant. In herbal medicine, the plant is a diaphoretic, or an agent to cause sweating. It was introduced to American colonists by natives who used the plant for breaking fevers by means of heavy sweating, and commonly used to treat fever by the African-American population of the southern United States. The name "boneset" comes from the use of the plant to treat dengue fever, which is also called "break-bone fever." It is nearly always found in low, wet areas.

== Description ==
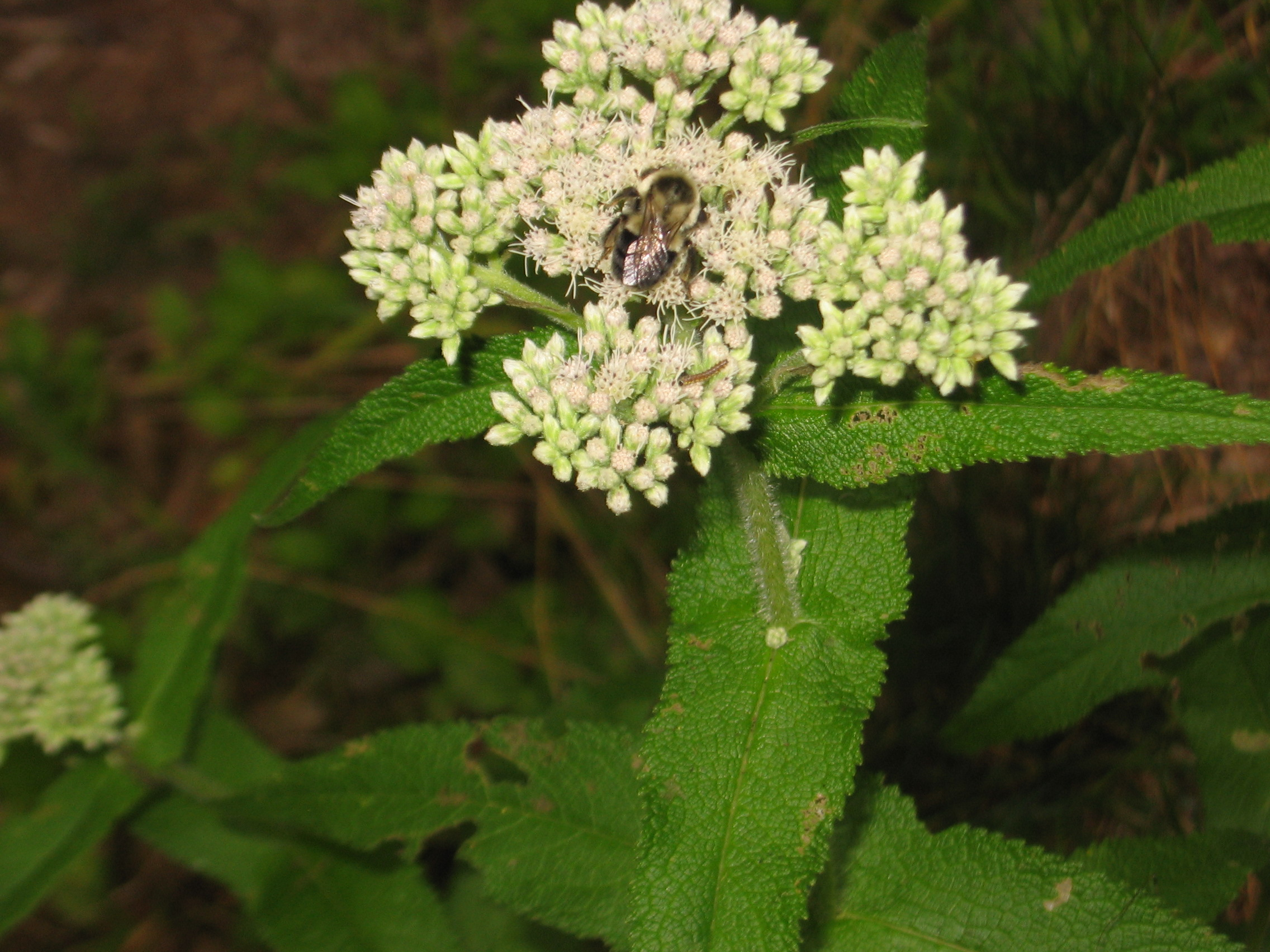
E. perfoliatum can be recognized from its perfoliate leaves

Eupatorium perfoliatum grows up to 100 cm (39 inches) tall, with opposite, serrate leaves that clasp the stems (perfoliate). The stem is hairy. The plant produces dense clusters of tiny white flower heads held above the foliage. In Illinois, the plant blooms during late summer and early fall. Its native habitats include damp prairies, bogs, and alluvial woods.

Eupatorium perfoliatum can form hybrids with other species of the genus Eupatorium, for example Eupatorium serotinum.

== Distribution and habitat ==
Eupatorium perfoliatum is found from Nova Scotia west to Manitoba and south to the northern portion of the Florida peninsula and Texas. It grows in wet habitats such as swamps, bogs, marshes, and wet pastures.

== Phytochemistry and safety ==
Eupatorium perfoliatum leaves and roots contain mixed phytochemicals, including polysaccharides (containing xylose and glucuronic acid), tannins, volatile oil, sesquiterpene lactones, sterols, triterpenes, alkaloids, and various flavonoids, such as quercetin, kaempferol, and caffeic acid derivatives. E. perfoliatum and several of its related species are listed on the Poisonous Plants Database of the US Food and Drug Administration, with E. perfoliatum described as an "unapproved homeopathic medicine" with unknown safety by the US National Library of Medicine.

Holistic health companies marketing fraudulent supplement products that contained E. perforliatum with claims of benefit against COVID-19 were warned by the US Food and Drug Administration in 2020 about making illegal health claims and scamming consumers from their money.

=== Traditional medicine ===
Eupatorium perfoliatum (also called boneset) was used in traditional medicine by Native Americans who applied extracts for fever and common colds. By the early 20th century, it was reported as commonly used by rural African-Americans in the Deep South to treat fever, including dengue fever, though it was considered less effective for yellow fever and typhoid fever. Possible effects of E. perfoliatum for these uses remain undefined by adequate scientific research, and are unconfirmed by high-quality clinical research. If consumed in large amounts, tea made from its leaves may cause diarrhea.
