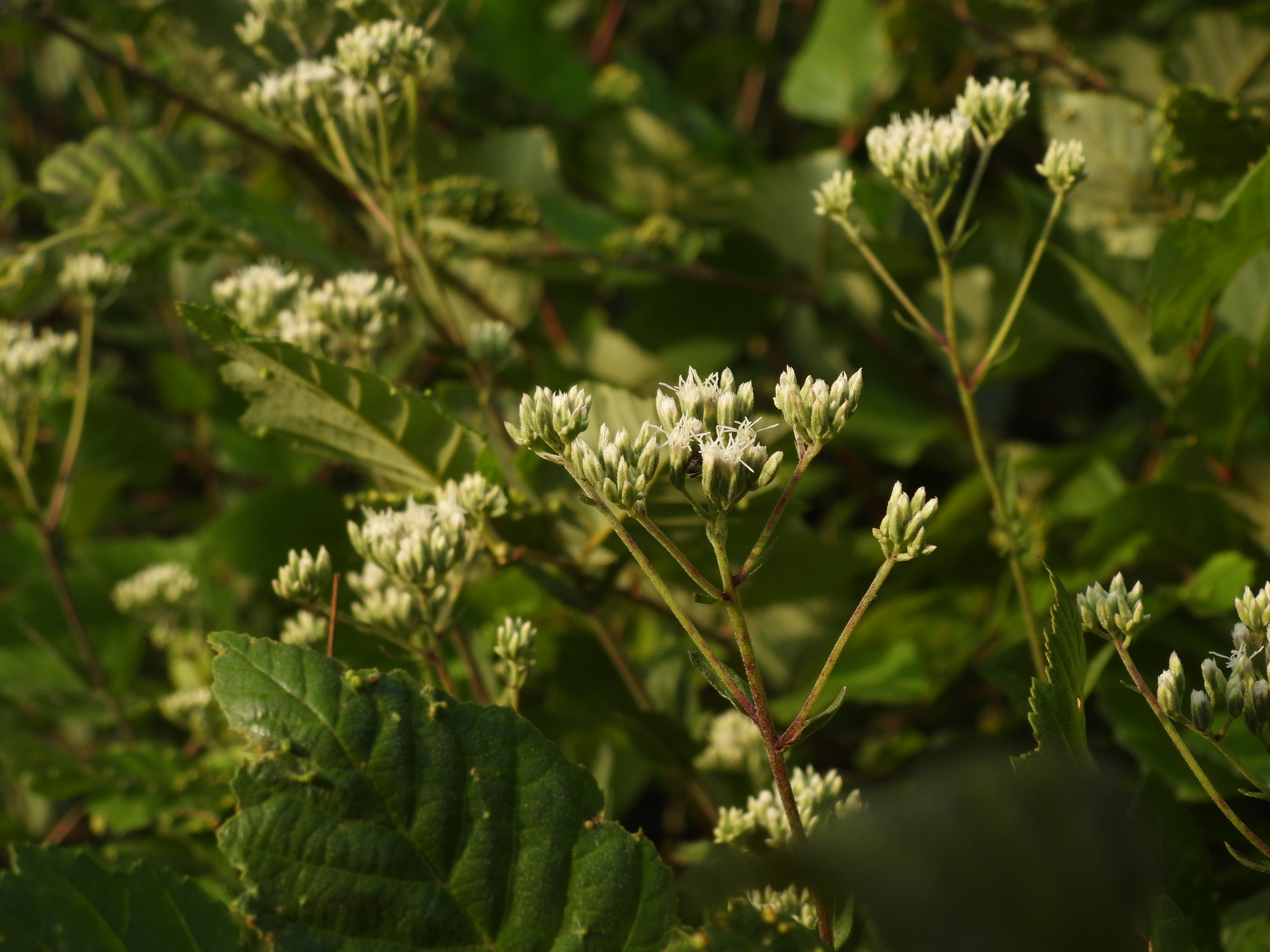

Scientific classification
- Kingdom: Plantae
- Clade: Tracheophytes
- Clade: Angiosperms
- Clade: Eudicots
- Clade: Asterids
- Order: Asterales
- Family: Asteraceae
- Genus: Eupatorium
- Species: E. pilosum

Binomial name
- Eupatorium pilosum Walter

Synonyms
- Eupatorium verbenifolium Michx.; Eupatorium lanceolatum Muhl. ex Willd.

= Eupatorium pilosum =

Species of flowering plant

Eupatorium pilosum, common name rough boneset, is a rare North American species of plant in the family Asteraceae. It is native to the eastern and south-central United States, found in every coastal state from Massachusetts to Texas, and as far inland as Kentucky.

Eupatorium pilosum is a perennial herb sometimes over 100 cm (40 inches) tall, spreading by means of underground rhizomes. The plant produces large displays of large numbers of tiny flower heads, each with 5 white disc florets but no ray florets.
