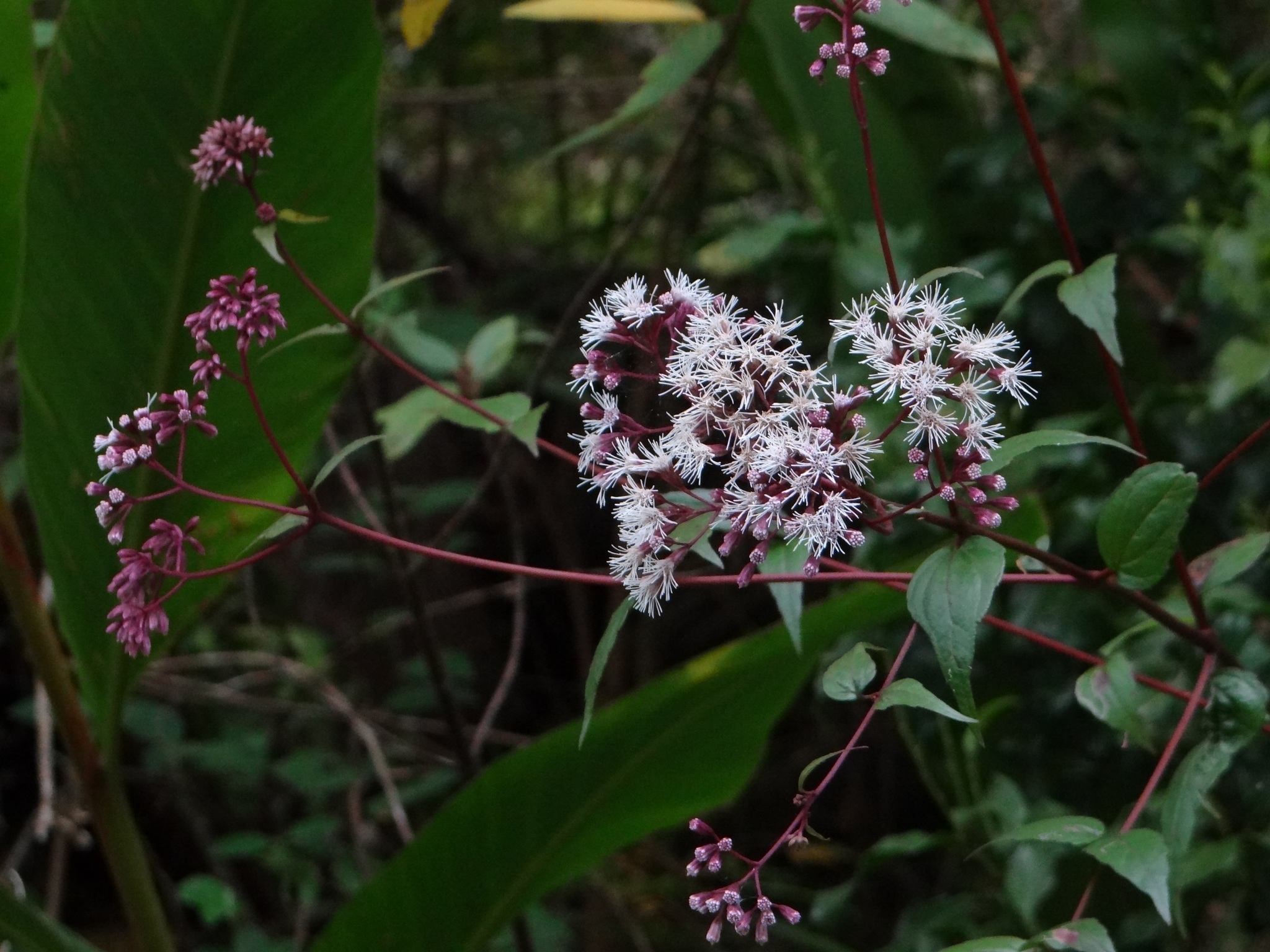

Scientific classification
- Kingdom: Plantae
- Clade: Tracheophytes
- Clade: Angiosperms
- Clade: Eudicots
- Clade: Asterids
- Order: Asterales
- Family: Asteraceae
- Genus: Eupatorium
- Species: E. amabile

Binomial name
- Eupatorium amabile Kitamura

= Eupatorium amabile =

Species of flowering plant

Eupatorium amabile is a shrubby plant in the family Asteraceae endemic to Taiwan.

Eupatorium amabile is a shrub that grows about 1 m tall, with more or less upright stems and slender branches that are densely glandular-villous near their ends. The 9–12 cm long and 4–3.5 cm wide leaves are medium green and pale green underneath, ovate or ovate-oblong in shape. The leaves have rounded bases and the margins are mucronate-serrate, and the apex is long acuminate. Terminal corymbs with 9–15 flowers are produced with flowers that have whitish Pappus. The black achenes are 2.5 mm long and sparsely covered with villous hairs.
