= Eupatorium yakushimaense =

Scientific classification
- Kingdom: Plantae
- Clade: Embryophytes
- Clade: Tracheophytes
- Clade: Angiosperms
- Clade: Eudicots
- Clade: Asterids
- Order: Asterales
- Family: Asteraceae
- Genus: Eupatorium
- Species: E. yakushimaense

Binomial name
- Eupatorium yakushimaense Masam. & Kitam.

Species of flowering plant

Eupatorium yakushimaense is a plant species in the family Asteraceae.
