= Eupatorium toppingianum =

Scientific classification
- Kingdom: Plantae
- Clade: Tracheophytes
- Clade: Angiosperms
- Clade: Eudicots
- Clade: Asterids
- Order: Asterales
- Family: Asteraceae
- Genus: Eupatorium
- Species: E. toppingianum

Binomial name
- Eupatorium toppingianum Elmer

Species of flowering plant

Eupatorium toppingianum is a plant species in the family Asteraceae. It contains substituted chromenes which have anti-microbial properties.
