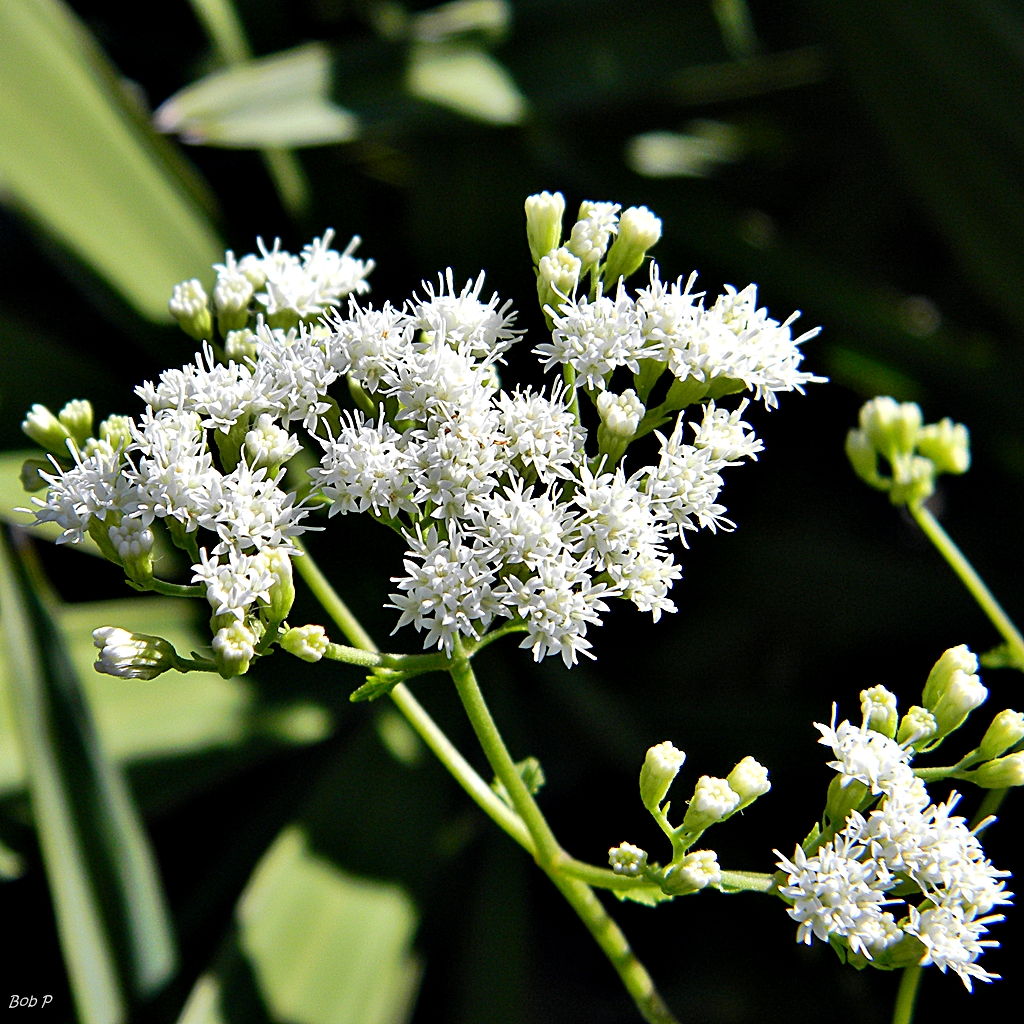

Conservation status
- Vulnerable (NatureServe)

Scientific classification
- Kingdom: Plantae
- Clade: Tracheophytes
- Clade: Angiosperms
- Clade: Eudicots
- Clade: Asterids
- Order: Asterales
- Family: Asteraceae
- Genus: Eupatorium
- Species: E. mikanioides

Binomial name
- Eupatorium mikanioides Chapm.

Synonyms
- Uncasia mikanioides (Chapm.) Greene; Eupatorium crassifolium Shuttlew. ex A.Gray 1884 not Raf. 1817

= Eupatorium mikanioides =

Species of plant

Eupatorium mikanioides, commonly called semaphore thoroughwort, is a herbaceous perennial plant in the family Asteraceae found only in the US state of Florida.

Like other members of the genus Eupatorium, it produces large numbers of small white flower heads, each head with 5 disc florets but no ray florets. It grows a half meter to one meter tall.

It grows in wet to moist areas, and is salt-tolerant.
