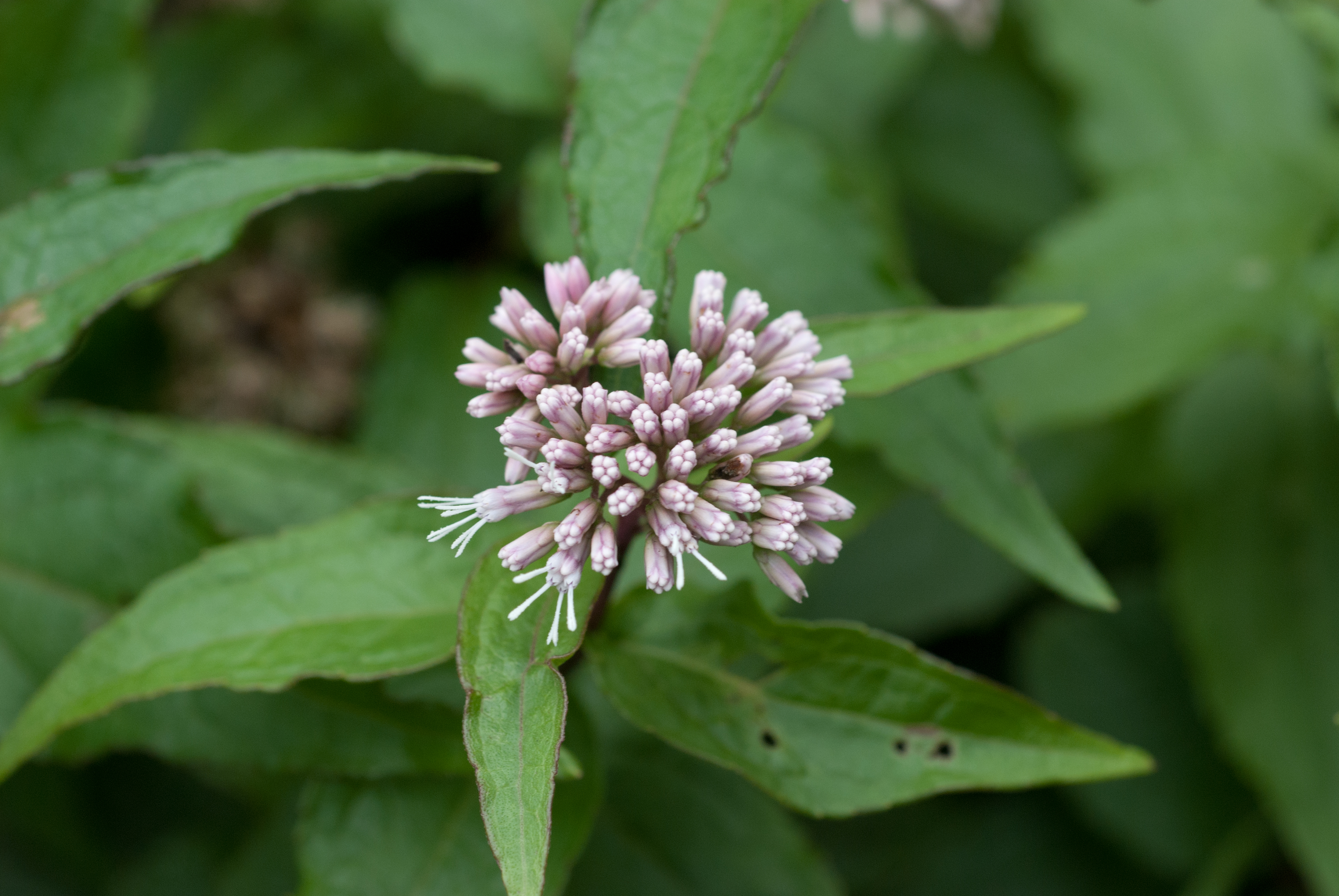

Scientific classification
- Kingdom: Plantae
- Clade: Tracheophytes
- Clade: Angiosperms
- Clade: Eudicots
- Clade: Asterids
- Order: Asterales
- Family: Asteraceae
- Genus: Eupatorium
- Species: E. luchuense

Binomial name
- Eupatorium luchuense Nakai

= Eupatorium luchuense =

Species of flowering plant

Eupatorium luchuense is a plant species in the family Asteraceae found in Taiwan.
