= Eupatorium benguetense =

Scientific classification
- Kingdom: Plantae
- Clade: Tracheophytes
- Clade: Angiosperms
- Clade: Eudicots
- Clade: Asterids
- Order: Asterales
- Family: Asteraceae
- Genus: Eupatorium
- Species: E. benguetense

Binomial name
- Eupatorium benguetense C.B.Rob.

Species of flowering plant

Eupatorium benguetense is a plant species in the family Asteraceae.

== Taxonomy ==
Eupatorium benguetense was described by Charles Budd Robinson in 1908, based on material collected on Mount Santo Tomas. All of the other specimens he cited also came from the province of Benguet, giving it its name.
