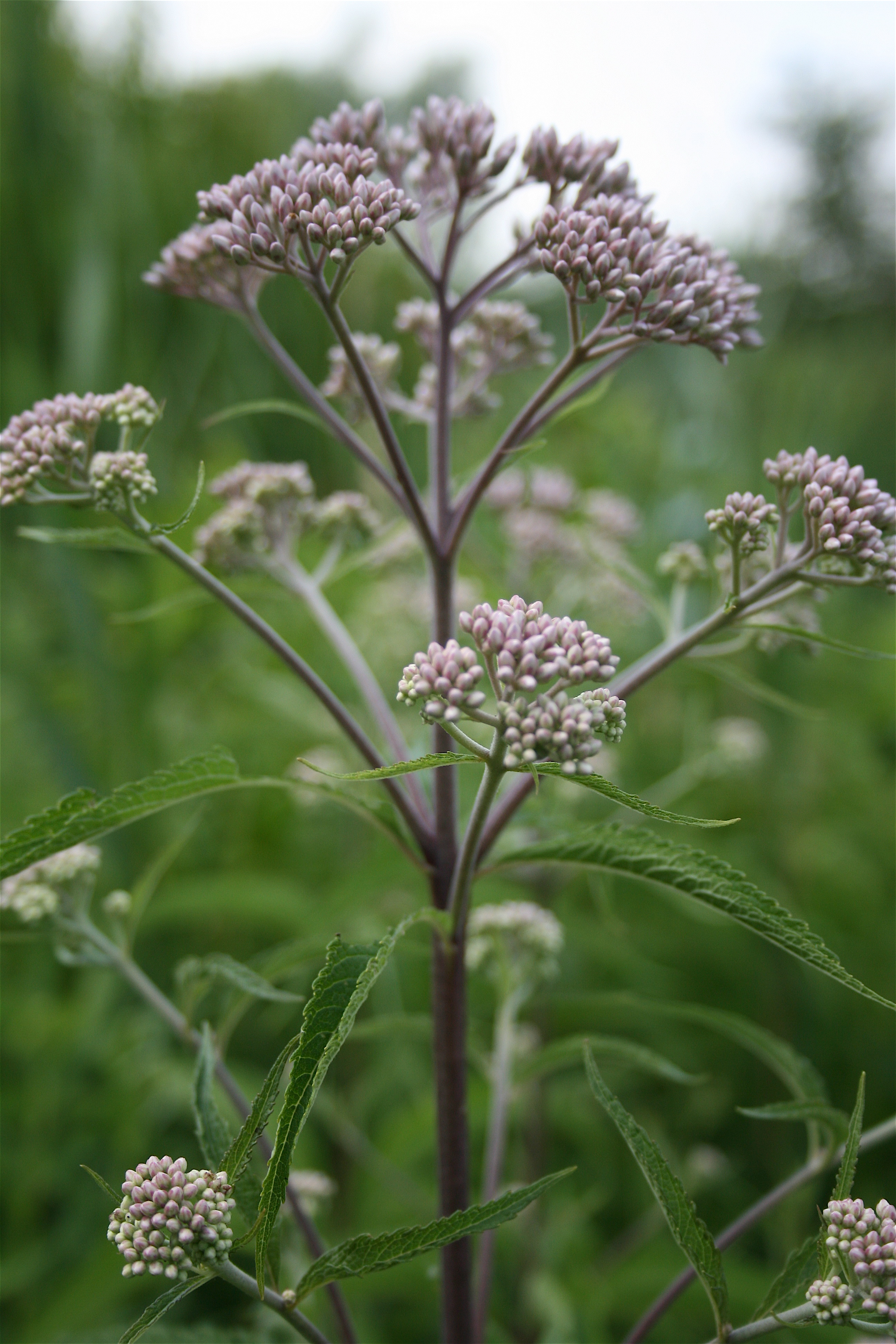
- Portage, Michigan

Conservation status
- Secure (NatureServe)

Scientific classification
- Kingdom: Plantae
- Clade: Embryophytes
- Clade: Tracheophytes
- Clade: Spermatophytes
- Clade: Angiosperms
- Clade: Eudicots
- Clade: Asterids
- Order: Asterales
- Family: Asteraceae
- Genus: Eutrochium
- Species: E. maculatum

Binomial name
- Eutrochium maculatum (L.) E.E.Lamont

Synonyms
- Synonymy: Eupatorium maculatum L.; Eupatorium purpureum subsp. maculatum (L.) Á.Löve & D.Löve; Eupatorium purpureum var. maculatum (L.) Voss; Eupatorium trifoliatum var. maculatum (L.) Farw.; Eupatoriadelphus maculatus (L.) R.M.King & H.Rob.; Eupatorium maculatum f. eresinatum Lepage; Eupatorium maculatum var. urticifolium Barratt ex Alph.Wood; Eupatorium purpureum var. maculatum (L.) Darl.; Eupatoriadelphus maculatus var. bruneri (A.Gray) R.M.King & H.Rob., syn of var. bruneri; Eupatorium maculatum var. bruneri (A.Gray) Breitung, syn of var. bruneri; Eupatorium maculatum subsp. bruneri (A.Gray) G.W.Douglas, syn of var. bruneri; Eupatorium purpureum var. bruneri (A.Gray) B.L.Rob., syn of var. bruneri; Eupatorium trifoliatum var. bruneri (A.Gray) Farw., syn of var. bruneri; Eupatorium bruneri var. foliosum (Fernald) House, syn of var. foliosum; Eupatorium maculatum var. foliosum (Fernald) Wiegand, syn of var. foliosum; Eupatorium purpureum var. foliosum Fernald, syn of var. foliosum; Eupatorium trifoliatum var. foliosum (Fernald) Farw., syn of var. foliosum

= Eutrochium maculatum =

Spotted Joe Pye weed

Species of flowering plant

Eutrochium maculatum, the spotted Joe Pye weed, is a North American species of flowering plant in the family Asteraceae. It is widespread through much of the United States and Canada. It is the only species of the genus Eutrochium found west of the Great Plains.

This herbaceous perennial sometimes grows as high as 2 m (6 ft 7 in). Stems are sometimes completely purple, sometimes green with purple spots. One plant can produce numerous rose-purple flower heads in late summer, each head with 8–22 disc flowers but no ray flowers. The specific name maculatum, meaning spotted, refers to the purple spots on the stem.

Spotted Joe Pye weed thrives in marshes, rich fens and swamps. It also does well in man-made moist expanses such as ditches, seepage areas and wet fields. Above all else the plant flourishes in the non-shaded environments that are also abundant in wetlands.

It is a larval host to the Clymene moth, the eupatorium borer moth, the ruby tiger moth, and the three-lined flower moth. The plant also attracts butterflies and honeybees.

== Varieties ==
The following varieties are known:

- Eutrochium maculatum var. bruneri (A. Gray) E. E. Lamont – western Canada (British Columbia to Saskatchewan), western US (Minnesota west to Idaho, south to Arizona + New Mexico)
- Eutrochium maculatum var. foliosum (Fernald) E. E. Lamont – eastern Canada (Newfoundland to Ontario), northern US (Maine to Minnesota)
- Eutrochium maculatum var. maculatum – eastern Canada (Newfoundland to Ontario), eastern US (Maine to Minnesota, south to northern Georgia)

== Cultivars ==
The following cultivars are recipients of the Royal Horticultural Society's Award of Garden Merit (listed under the synonym Eupatorium maculatum):

- (Atropurpureum Group) 'Orchard Dene'
- (Atropurpureum Group) 'Purple Bush'
- (Atropurpureum Group) 'Riesenschirm'

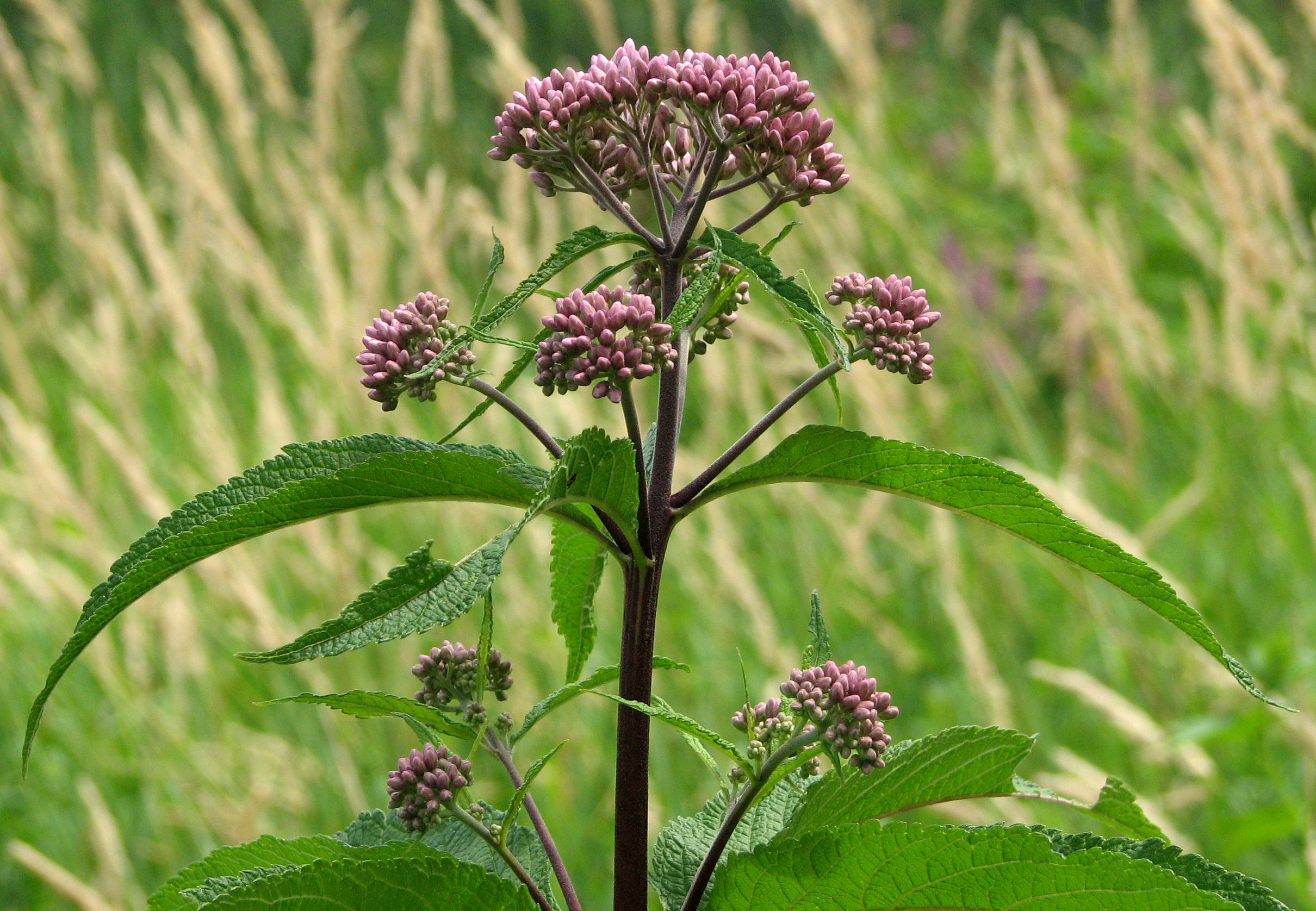
Ottawa, Ontario
