= Eupatorium variabile =

Scientific classification
- Kingdom: Plantae
- Clade: Tracheophytes
- Clade: Angiosperms
- Clade: Eudicots
- Clade: Asterids
- Order: Asterales
- Family: Asteraceae
- Genus: Eupatorium
- Species: E. variabile

Binomial name
- Eupatorium variabile Makino

Species of flowering plant

Eupatorium variabile is a species of flowering plant in the family Asteraceae. It is native to Japan and the Ryukyu Islands.
