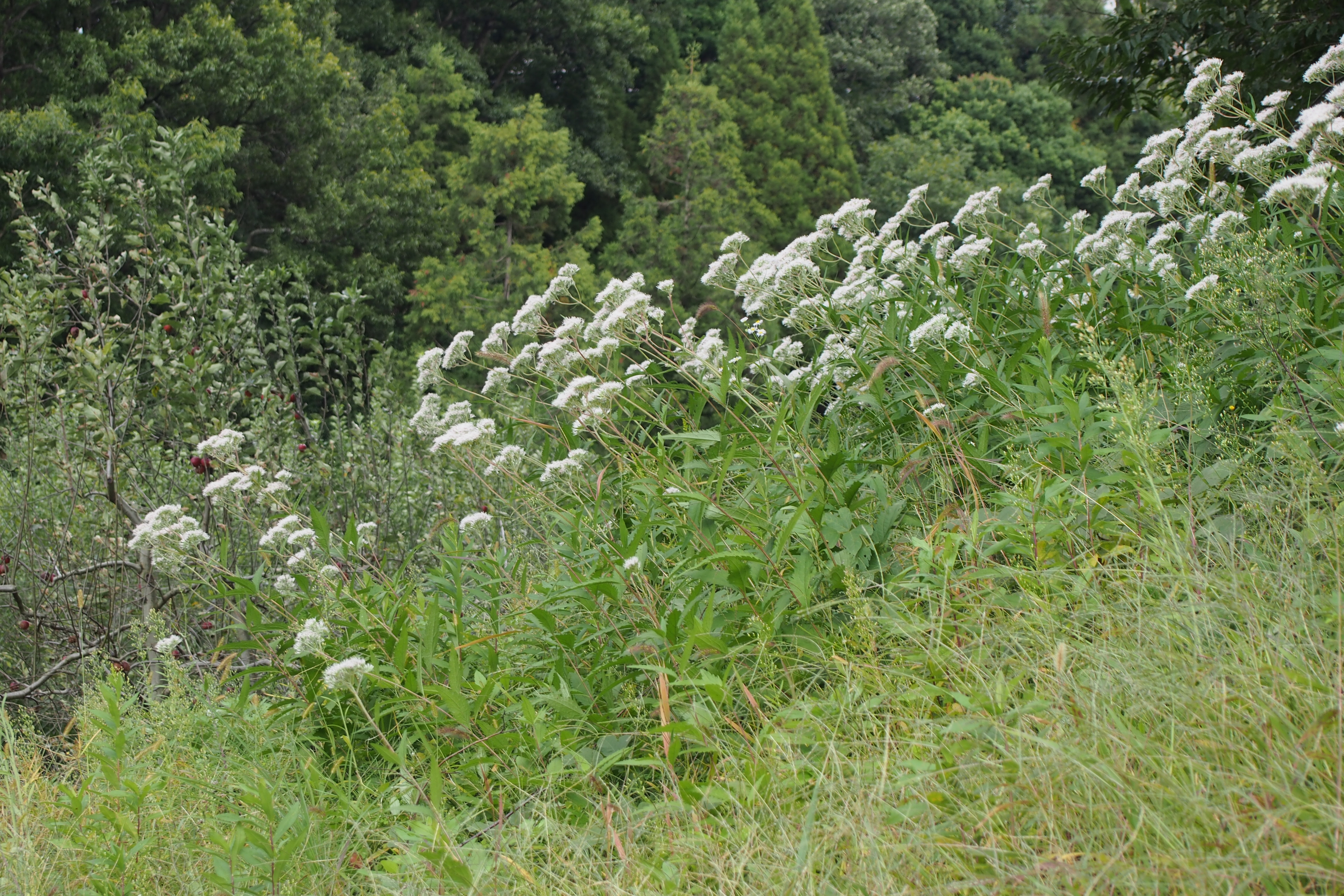

Scientific classification
- Kingdom: Plantae
- Clade: Tracheophytes
- Clade: Angiosperms
- Clade: Eudicots
- Clade: Asterids
- Order: Asterales
- Family: Asteraceae
- Genus: Eupatorium
- Species: E. lindleyanum

Binomial name
- Eupatorium lindleyanum DC.

= Eupatorium lindleyanum =

Species of flowering plant

Eupatorium lindleyanum is a herbaceous perennial plant in the family Asteraceae native from China, Japan, Korea and Siberia. There are at least two varieties including:

- Eupatorium lindleyanum var. lindleyanum
- Eupatorium lindleyanum var. eglandulosum

== Description ==
Eupatorium lindleyanum is a herbaceous perennial growing from 30 to 150 cm tall from a short rhizome.
