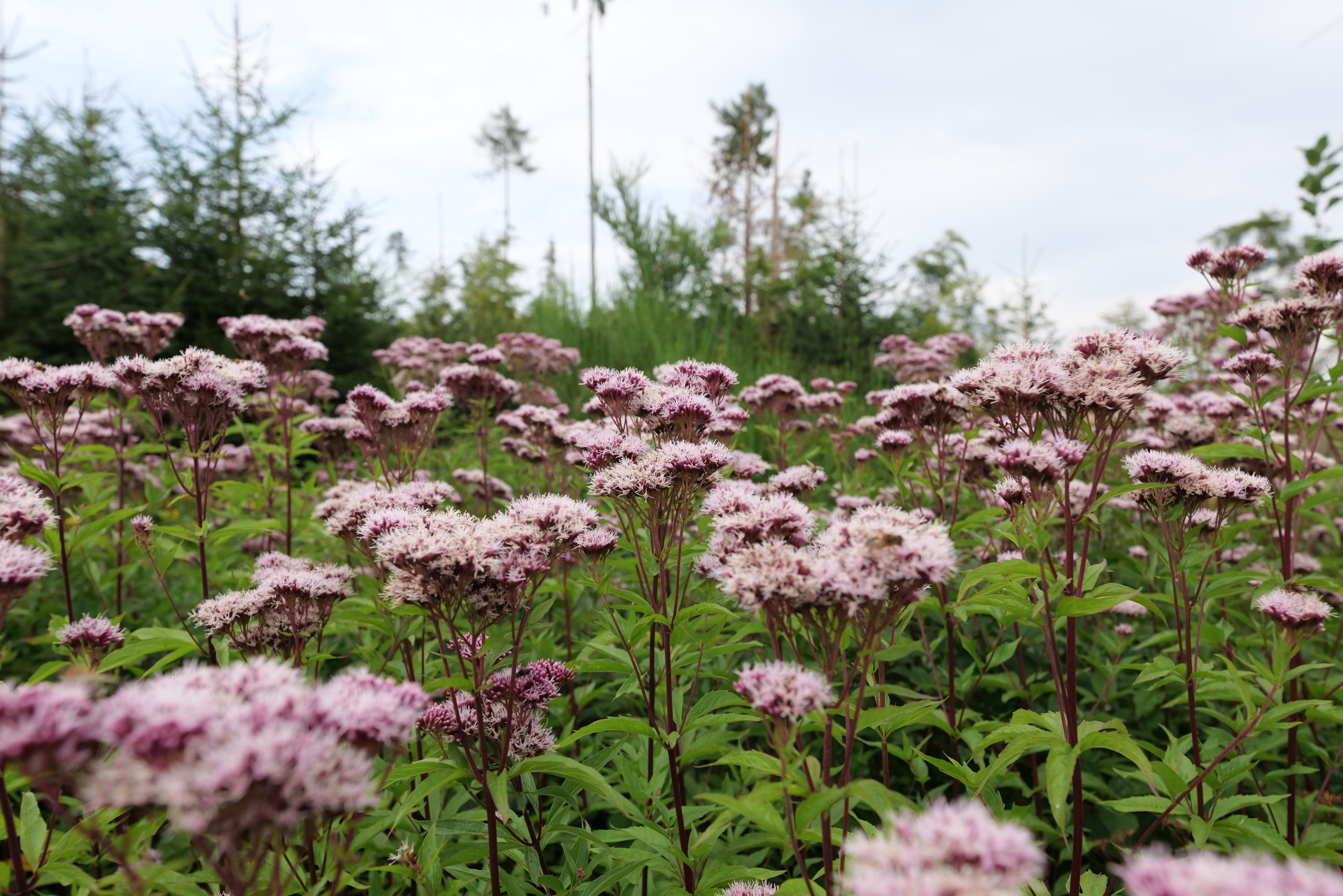
- Eupatorium cannabinum

Scientific classification
- Kingdom: Plantae
- Clade: Tracheophytes
- Clade: Angiosperms
- Clade: Eudicots
- Clade: Asterids
- Order: Asterales
- Family: Asteraceae
- Subfamily: Asteroideae
- Tribe: Eupatorieae
- Genus: Eupatorium; L. 1753 not Bubani 1899 (Rosaceae)

Synonyms
- Eupatorium sect. Pteropoda DC.; Eupatorium sect. Subimbricata Hoffm.; Viereckia R.M.King & H.Rob.; Chrone Dulac; Cunigunda Bubani; Pseudokyrsteniopsis R.M.King & H.Rob.; Eupatorium sect. Heterolepis Baker; Eriopappus Hort. ex Loudon; Caradesia Raf.; Eupatorium sect. Dalea Loudon; Halea L.; Eupatoriadelphus R.M.King & H.Rob.

= Eupatorium =

Genus of plants

Eupatorium is a genus of flowering plants in the family Asteraceae, containing from 36 to 60 species depending on the classification system. Most are herbaceous perennials growing to 0.5–3 m (1.6–9.8 ft) tall. A few are shrubs. The genus is native to temperate regions of the Northern Hemisphere. The type species of the genus Eupatorium cannabinum, which is also the sole European species, is known as hemp-agrimony. Most in North America are commonly called boneset, thoroughwort or snakeroot. The genus is named after Mithridates VI Eupator, king of Pontus.

== Systematics and taxonomy ==
Eupatorium has at times been held to contain as many as 800 species, but many of these have been moved (at least by some authors) to other genera, including Ageratina, Chromolaena, Condylidium, Conoclinium, Critonia, Cronquistianthus, Eutrochium, Fleischmannia, Flyriella, Hebeclinium, Koanophyllon, Mikania, and Tamaulipa.

The classification of the tribe Eupatorieae, including species placed in Eupatorium in the present or past, is an area of ongoing research, so further changes are likely. What seems fairly certain by now is that there is a monophyletic group containing Eupatorium (about 42 species of white flowered plants in North America, Europe and Asia, but not South America) and the Joe-pye weeds (Eutrochium), and possibly others.

== Uses ==
Eupatorium are grown as ornamental plants, particularly in Asia. A number of popular ornamental plants formerly included in Eupatorium have been moved to other genera, such as Bartlettina and Conoclinium.

Tobacco leaf curl virus is a pathogen occasionally affecting plants of this genus. The foliage is eaten by some Lepidoptera larvae, including those of Orthonama obstipata (The Gem).

=== Medical use ===
The common names for the plants are all based on the previous usage of one species, Eupatorium perfoliatum, as an herbal medicine. Despite its name, boneset is not used to treat broken bones, instead the common name apparently derives from the herb's use to treat dengue fever, which was also called breakbone fever because of the pain that it caused. The name thoroughwort also comes from Eupatorium perfoliatum, and refers to the perfoliate leaves, in which the stem appears to pierce the leaf (i.e. go through, note that in older usage "thorough" was not distinguished from "through", compare for example the word thoroughfare).

Boneset, although poisonous to humans and grazing livestock, has been used in folk medicine, for instance to excrete excess uric acid which causes gout. Caution is advised when using boneset, since it contains toxic compounds that can cause liver damage. Side effects include muscular tremors, weakness, and constipation; overdoses may be deadly.

== Selected species ==
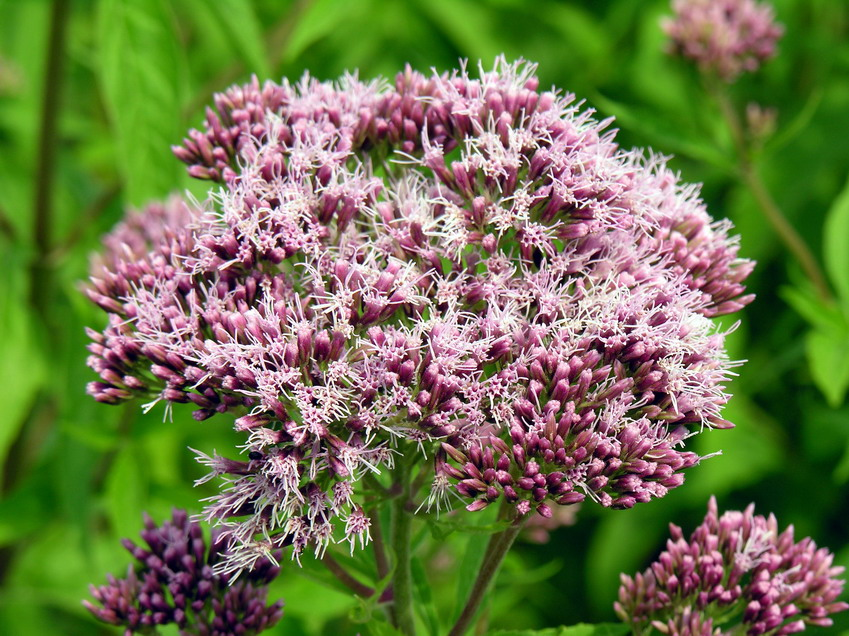
Hemp-agrimony, Eupatorium cannabinum

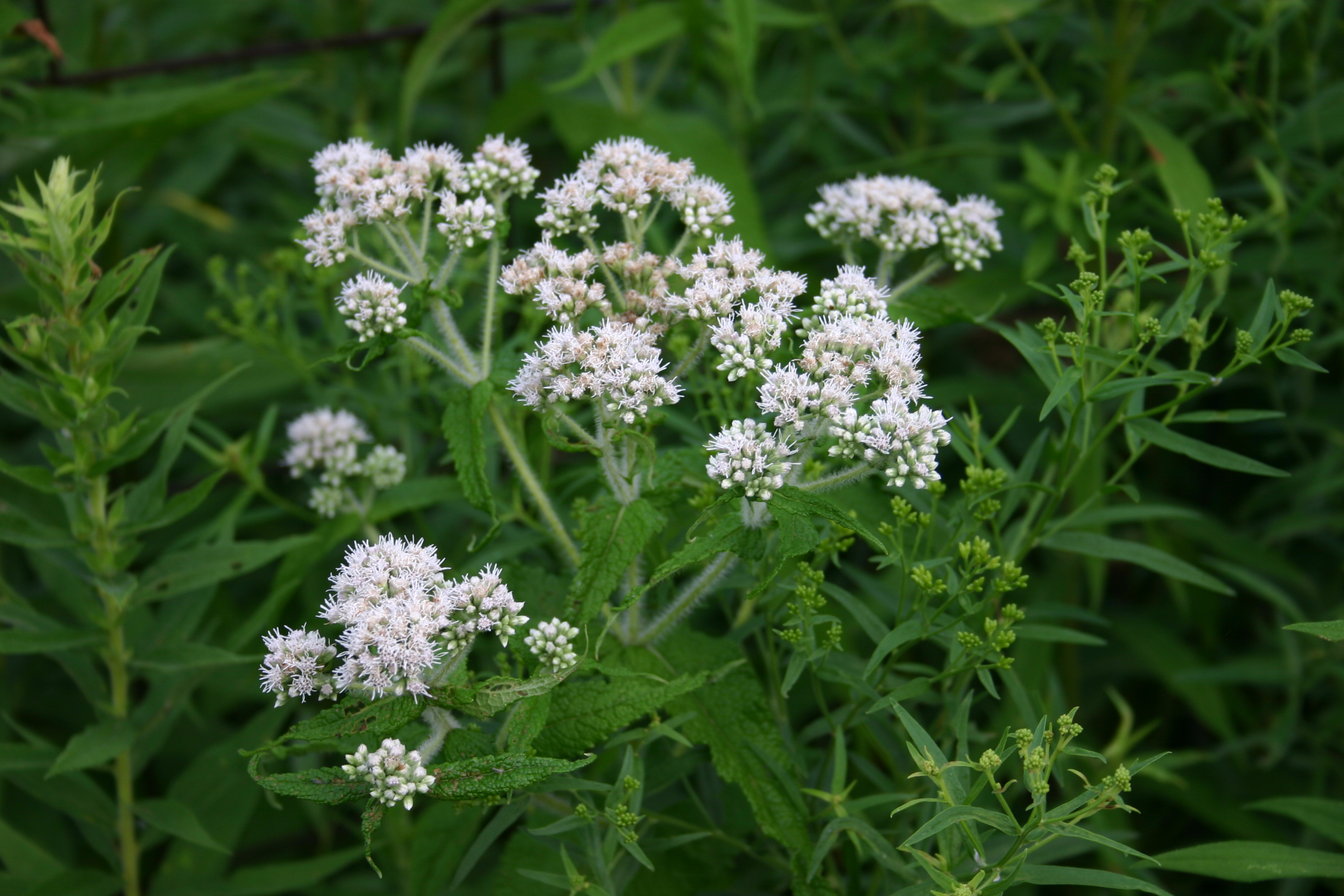
Common boneset, Eupatorium perfoliatum

=== North America ===
- Eupatorium album L.– white thoroughwort
- Eupatorium altissimum L. – tall thoroughwort
- Eupatorium anomalum Nash – Florida thoroughwort an apomictic hybrid derivative of Eupatorium mohrii and Eupatorium rotundifolium
- Eupatorium capillifolium (Lamarck) Small – dog-fennel
- Eupatorium compositifolium Walter – Yankeeweed
- Eupatorium godfreyanum Cronquist, an apomictic hybrid derivative of Eupatorium rotundifolium and Eupatorium sessilifolium
- Eupatorium hyssopifolium L. – hyssop-leaved thoroughwort
- Eupatorium lancifolium (Torrey & A.Gray) Small – lance-leaved thoroughwort
- Eupatorium leptophyllum DC. – false fennel
- Eupatorium leucolepis (DC.) Torrey & A.Gray – justiceweed
- Eupatorium linearifolium Walter – (Eupatorium cuneifolium)
- Eupatorium maritimum E.E.Schill. – an apomictic hybrid derivative of Eupatorium mohrii and Eupatorium serotinum
- Eupatorium mikanioides Chapman – semaphore thoroughwort
- Eupatorium mohrii Greene – Mohr's thoroughwort
- Eupatorium novae-angliae (Fernald) V.I.Sullivan ex A.Haines & Sorrie an apomictic hybrid derivative of Eupatorium paludicola and Eupatorium perfoliatum
- Eupatorium paludicola E.E.Schill. & LeBlond – swamp thoroughwort, until 2007 classified as part of Eupatorium leucolepis
- Eupatorium perfoliatum L. – common boneset
- Eupatorium petaloideum Britton – showy white thoroughwort, often considered to be part of Eupatorium album
- Eupatorium pilosum Walter – rough boneset, often considered to be part of Eupatorium rotundifolium
- Eupatorium resinosum Torrey ex DC. – pine barren boneset
- Eupatorium rotundifolium L. – round-leaved thoroughwort
- Eupatorium semiserratum DC. – smallflower thoroughwort
- Eupatorium serotinum L. – late boneset, late thoroughwort
- Eupatorium sessilifolium L. – upland boneset
- Eupatorium sullivaniae E.E.Schill. – an apomictic hybrid derivative of Eupatorium album and Eupatorium lancifolium

=== Europe ===
- Eupatorium cannabinum L. – hemp-agrimony

=== Asia ===
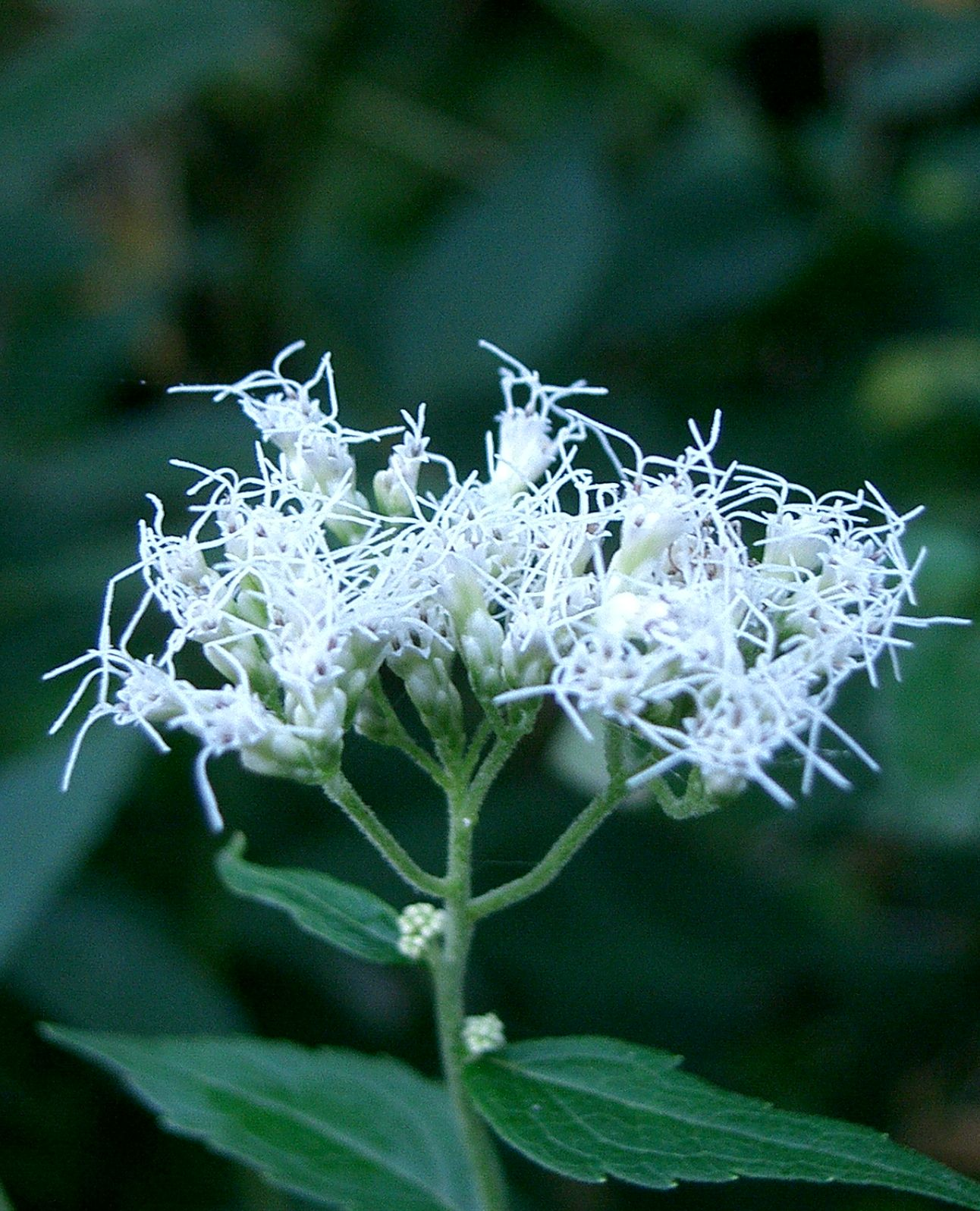
Eupatorium makinoi

- Eupatorium amabile Kitam.
- Eupatorium benguetense C.Robinson
- Eupatorium camiguinense Merr.
- Eupatorium chinense L.
- Eupatorium formosanum Hayata
- Eupatorium fortunei Turcz. – fujibakama, pei lan
- Eupatorium japonicum Thunb. (often included in E. chinense)
- Eupatorium leonardii Ferreras & E.E.Lamont|
- Eupatorium lindleyanum DC.
- Eupatorium luchuense Nakai
- Eupatorium makinoi T.Kawahara & T.Yahara (see E. chinense)
- Eupatorium nodiflorum DC.
- Eupatorium quaternum DC.
- Eupatorium sambucifolium Elmer
- Eupatorium shimadai Kitam.
- Eupatorium squamosum D.Don
- Eupatorium tashiroi Hayata
- Eupatorium toppingianum Elmer
- Eupatorium variabile Makino
- Eupatorium yakushimaense Masam. & Kitam

=== Moved to other genera ===
- Eupatorium adamantium Gardner (moved to Koanophyllon)
- Eupatorium amygdalinum (moved to Ayapana)
- Eupatorium ayapana – aya-pana, water hemp (moved to Ayapana triplinervis)
- Eupatorium bracteatum Gardn. (moved to Stomatanthes, S. pernambucensis)
- Eupatorium coelestinum – mistflower (moved to Conoclinium)
- Eupatorium collinum (moved to Chromolaena collina)
- Eupatorium itatiayense Hieron. (moved to Symphyopappus)
- Eupatorium gayanum (moved to Aristeguietia gayana)
- Eupatorium laevigatum DC. (moved to Chromolaena)
- Eupatorium ligustrinum (moved to Ageratina ligustrina)
- Eupatorium maculatum (moved to Eutrochium maculatum) Joe-Pye weed
- Eupatorium maximiliani Schrad. ex DC. (moved to Chromolaena)
- Eupatorium megalophyllum (moved to Bartlettina sordida)
- Eupatorium officinale (moved to Mikania)
- Eupatorium pacificum (moved to Ageratina)
- Eupatorium purpureum (moved to Eutrochium purpureum)
- Eupatorium pyrifolium DC. (moved to Steyermarkina)
- Eupatorium rufescens P.W.Lund. ex DC. (moved to Kaunia)
- Eupatorium rugosum (moved to Ageratina altissima)
- Eupatorium sordidum (moved to Bartlettina sordida)
- Eupatorium squalidum DC. (moved to Chromolaena)
- Eupatorium urticaefolium (moved to Ageratina, synonym of A. altissima)
- Eupatorium vauthierianum DC. (moved to Heterocondylus alatus)

== Bibliography ==
- Hatfield, Gabrielle (2004). Encyclopedia of Folk Medicine: Old World and New World Traditions. Santa Barbara: ABC-CLIO, Inc. ISBN 1-57607-874-4.
- Ito, Motomi; Watanabe, Kuniaki; Kita, Yoko; Kawahara, Takayuki; Crawford, Dj; Yahara, Tetsukazu (2000). "Phylogeny and Phytogeography of Eupatorium (Eupatorieae, Asteraceae): Insights from Sequence Data of the nrDNA ITS Regions and cpDNA RFLP". Journal of Plant Research. 113 (1): 79–89. Bibcode:2000JPlR..113...79I. doi:10.1007/PL00013913. S2CID 22540433.
- Lamont, E.E. (1995). Taxonomy of Eupatorium Section Verticillata (Asteraceae). New York Botanical Garden Press. ISBN 0-89327-391-0.
- Longe, Jacqueline L. (2005). The Gale Encyclopedia of Alternative Medicine. Vol. 1 (2nd ed.). New York: Gale Group. ISBN 0-7876-7424-9.
- Schmidt, Gregory J.; Schilling, Edward E. (May 2000). "Phylogeny and biogeography of Eupatorium (Asteraceae: Eupatorieae) based on nuclear ITS sequence data". Am. J. Bot. 87 (5): 716–26. doi:10.2307/2656858. JSTOR 2656858. PMID 10811796.
- Sharma, Om P.; Dawra, Rajinder K.; Kurade, Nitin P.; Sharma, Pritam D. (1998). "A review of the toxicosis and biological properties of the genus Eupatorium". Natural Toxins. 6 (1): 1–14. doi:10.1002/(SICI)1522-7189(199802)6:1<1::AID-NT3>3.0.CO;2-E. PMID 9851506.
- Whittemore, Alan (1987). "The Sectional Nomenclature of Eupatorium (Asteraceae)". Taxon. 36 (3): 618–620. doi:10.2307/1221856. JSTOR 1221856.
- Media related to Eupatorium at Wikimedia Commons
- Data related to Eupatorium at Wikispecies
