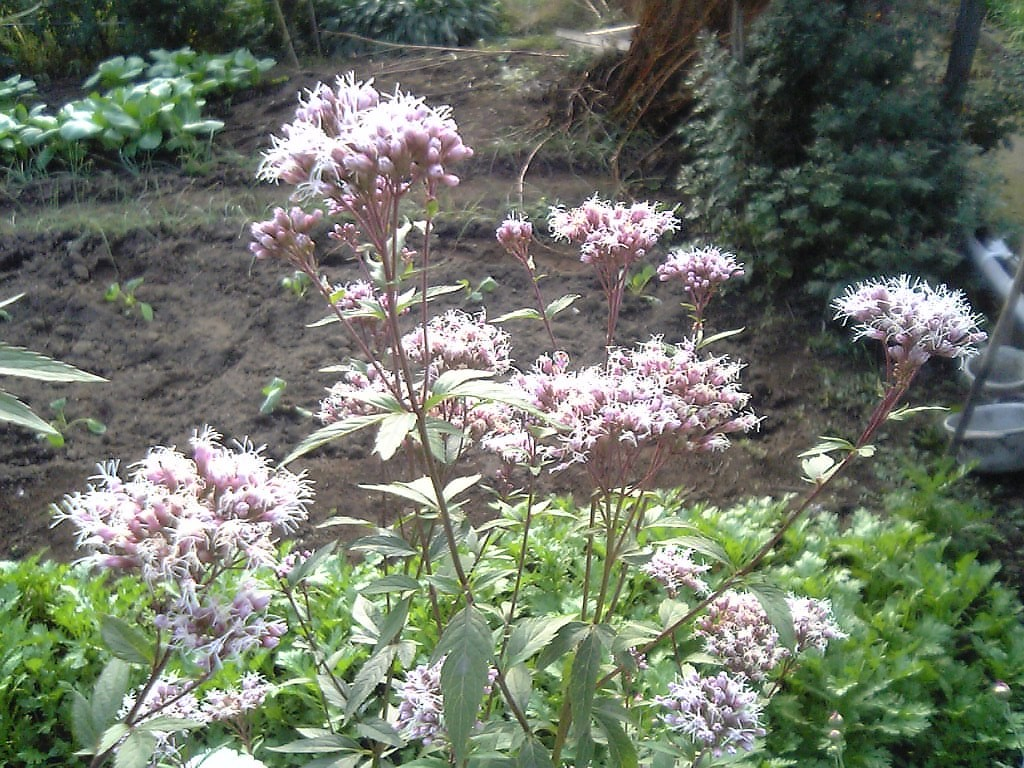
- Eupatorium japonicum var. tripartitum

Scientific classification
- Kingdom: Plantae
- Clade: Tracheophytes
- Clade: Angiosperms
- Clade: Eudicots
- Clade: Asterids
- Order: Asterales
- Family: Asteraceae
- Genus: Eupatorium
- Species: E. japonicum

Binomial name
- Eupatorium japonicum Thunberg ex Murray.

= Eupatorium japonicum =

Species of flowering plant

Eupatorium japonicum, known as fragrant eupatorium in English and 白头婆 bai tou po, in Chinese, is a herbaceous plant species in the family Asteraceae. It is native to China, Japan and Korea.

== Description ==
Eupatorium japonicum is a herbaceous perennial growing 50–200 cm tall from short rhizomes with many fibrous roots. The stems are upright and marked with purplish red, ending with simple or corymbose, (flat) inflorescence that branch near their ends. The leaves are oppositely arranged on the stems and have short but rather thick petioles that are 1–2 cm long. The leaves midway up the stems are elliptic, narrowly elliptic, ovate-elliptic, or lanceolate in shape and 6 to 20 long and 2 to 6.5 cm wide. The leaves are pinnately veined, with lateral veins 7-paired, the undersides of the leaves have prominent veining. The Leaves gradually tapper to a sharp point and the bases are broad or narrow, and the leaf margins are sometimes 3-partite. Before flowering, the basel foliage withers away. The upper leaves of the stems are the same shape but smaller than those below them. The foliage is scabrid, crisped-villous or puberulent with yellow glandular hairs. Leaf margins are coarsely or double-serrate. The flowers are collected together into capitula (heads) that are densely corymbose, the inflorescence are usually 3 to 6 cm wide and rarely form large compound corymbose inflorescence that can be up to 20 cm wide. The involucre are campanulate shaped and 5–6 mm wide, composed of five flowers. The lanceolate shaped phyllaries are imbricate, with 3-seriate edges, the outer phyllaries are very short, only 1–2 mm wide, and green or purple-tinged. The florets are white, red-purple, or pink, with corolla about 5 mm wide and the corolla is covered with yellow glands. The fruits are black-brown, 5-angled, hairless achenes, that are elliptic in shape and about 3.5 mm long, and are covered with yellow glands. The 5 mm long pappus are white. This species blooms and fruits from June to November.

== Taxonomy ==
King and Robinson, in a 1987 paper, considered E. japonicum to be part of a more broadly defined E. chinense.

There are two varieties of Eupatorium japonicum:

- Eupatorium japonicum var. japonicum with leaves not 3-partite.
- Eupatorium japonicum var. tripartitum with leaves 3-partite.

== Toxicity ==
Eupatorium japonicum contains tumorigenic pyrrolizidine alkaloids.
