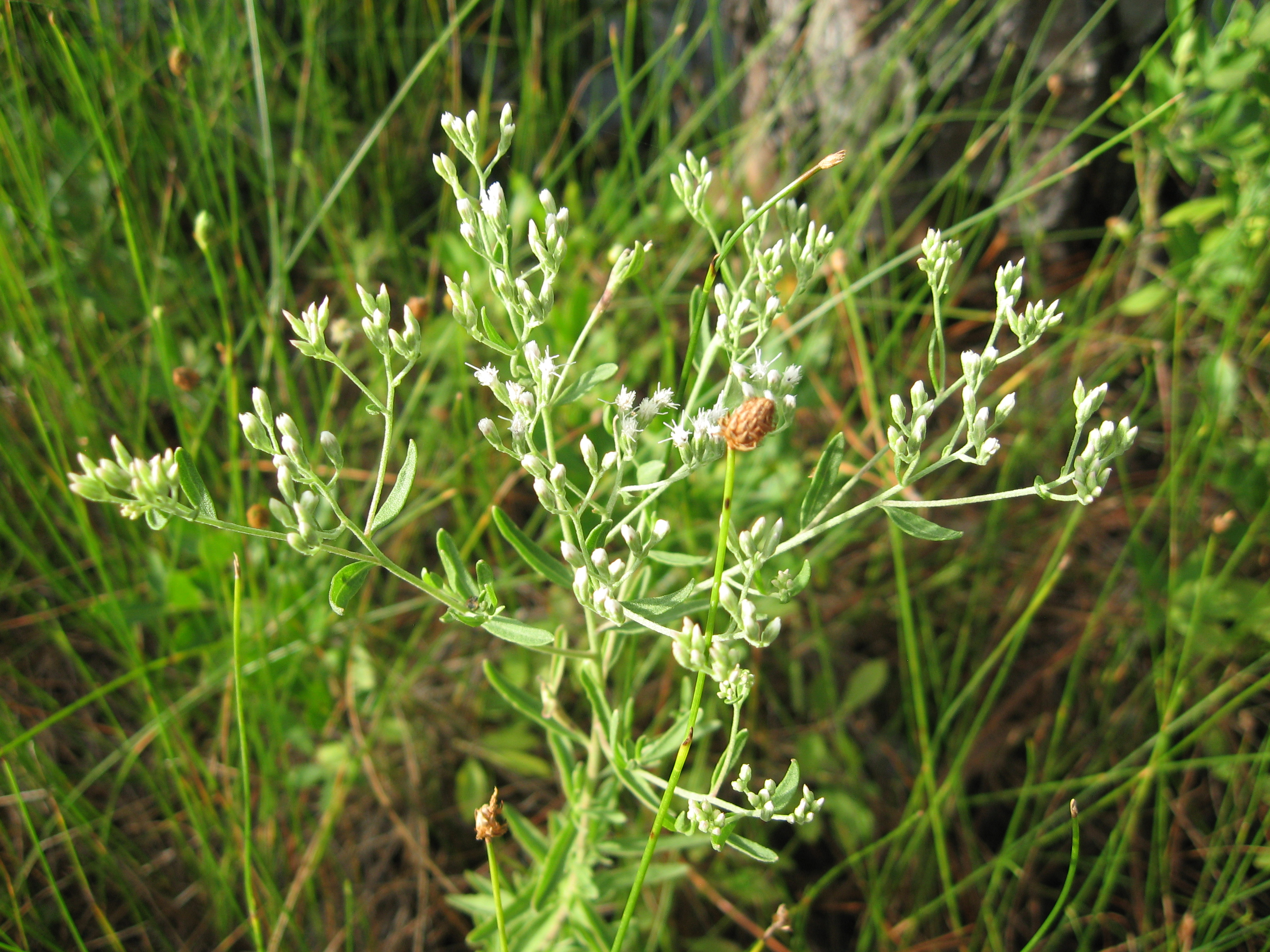
- St. Joseph Peninsula State Park, Florida

Conservation status
- Apparently Secure (NatureServe)

Scientific classification
- Kingdom: Plantae
- Clade: Tracheophytes
- Clade: Angiosperms
- Clade: Eudicots
- Clade: Asterids
- Order: Asterales
- Family: Asteraceae
- Genus: Eupatorium
- Species: E. mohrii

Binomial name
- Eupatorium mohrii Greene

Synonyms
- Eupatorium recurvans Small; Uncasia mohrii (Greene) Greene; Eupatorium quinqueflorum Urb. & Ekman

= Eupatorium mohrii =

Species of plant

Eupatorium mohrii, commonly called Mohr's thoroughwort, is a herbaceous perennial plant in the family Asteraceae native to the southeastern and south-central states of the United States, in the coastal plain from Virginia to Texas. It has also been found in the Dominican Republic.

Eupatorium mohrii is a perennial herb up to 100 cm (40 inches) tall and are producing tuberous rhizomes. As with other species of Eupatorium, the inflorescences contain a large number of tiny white flower heads, each with 5 disc florets but no ray florets. It forms hybrids with Eupatorium serotinum and Eupatorium rotundifolium.

== Distribution and habitat ==
Eupatorium mohrii is distributed from southeast Virginia south to South Florida and west to Texas. It grows in moist areas, edges of ponds, and sandy soils, as well as in moist pine savannas and other wet habitats.

This species is commonly found in fire-dependent pinelands. Its seeds can persist in the soil seed bank after a fire disturbance.
