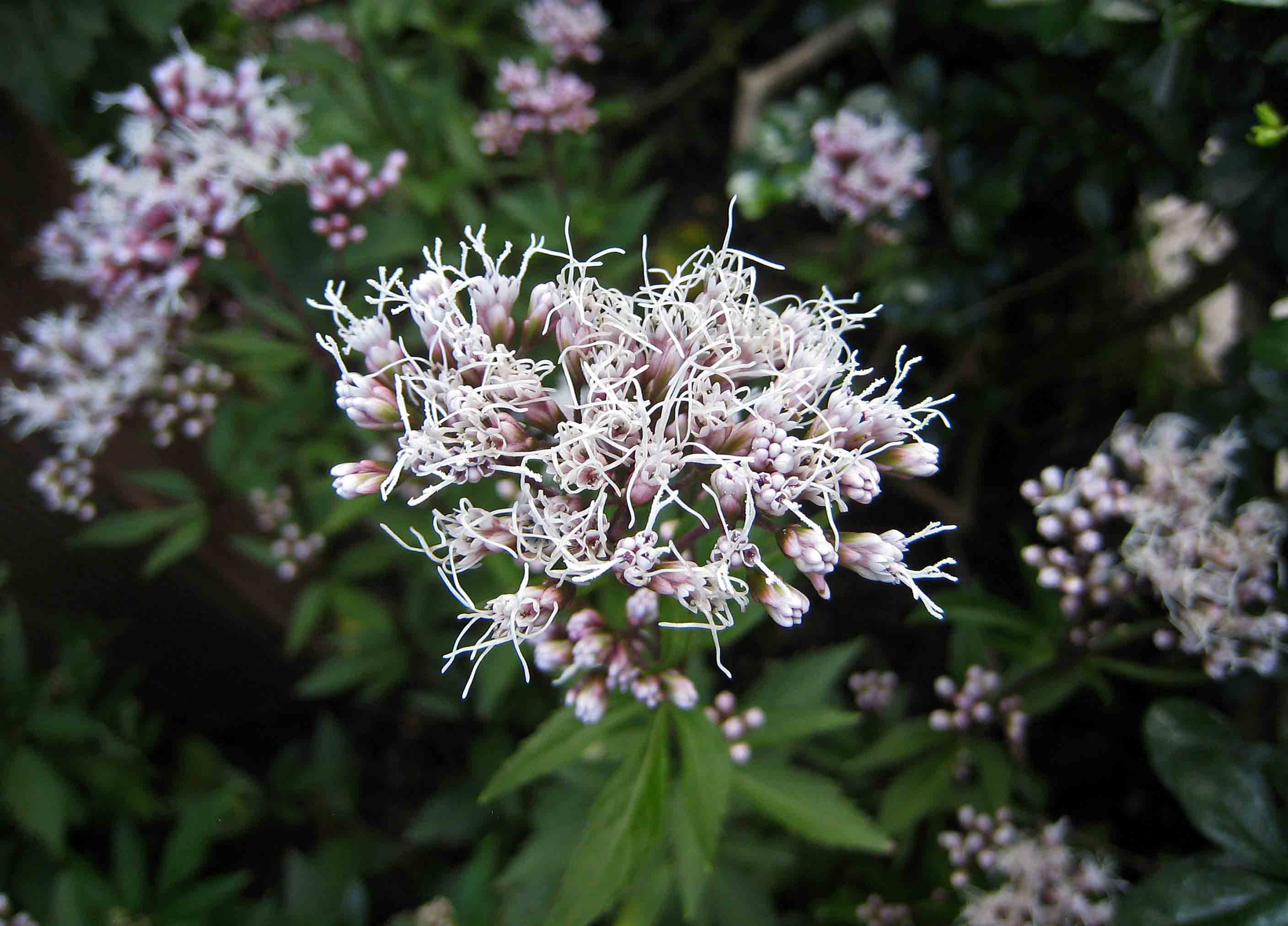

Scientific classification
- Kingdom: Plantae
- Clade: Tracheophytes
- Clade: Angiosperms
- Clade: Eudicots
- Clade: Asterids
- Order: Asterales
- Family: Asteraceae
- Genus: Eupatorium
- Species: E. fortunei

Binomial name
- Eupatorium fortunei Turcz.

= Eupatorium fortunei =

Species of flowering plant

Eupatorium fortunei is a plant species in the family Asteraceae native from Asia where it is rare in the wild but commonly cultivated. The white to reddish colored flowers and herbage smell like lavender when crushed. In China the plants are used to make fragrant oils.

== Description ==
Eupatorium fortunei is a herbaceous perennial that grows 40 to 100 centimeters tall, growing from procumbent rhizomes. Plants are upright growing with green stems that are often tinted with reddish or purple dots. The stems have few branches and the inflorescence is apically branched. Cauline foliage is large with short petioles, the 5 to 10 cm long and 1.5 to 2.5 cm wide leaves are 3-sected or 3-partite and the terminal lobe of the leaves is large and narrowly elliptic to elliptic-lanceolate or oblanceolate shaped. The margins of the leaves are toothed, the largest leaves are produced mid stem and the leaves become smaller as they descend down the stems, the bottom leaves wither away by the time flowering begins. The flowers are in capitula, which are numerous and arranged in apical compound corymbs; inflorescence 3 to 10 cm across. The phyllaries are purple-red, they also lack hairs and glands. The florets are white to reddish in color, have 5 cm wide corolla that also lack glands. The elliptically shaped fruits are 5 angled achenes which are black-brown in color and 3–4 mm long. Pappus is white and about 5 mm long. This species flowers and fruits in July through November in China.

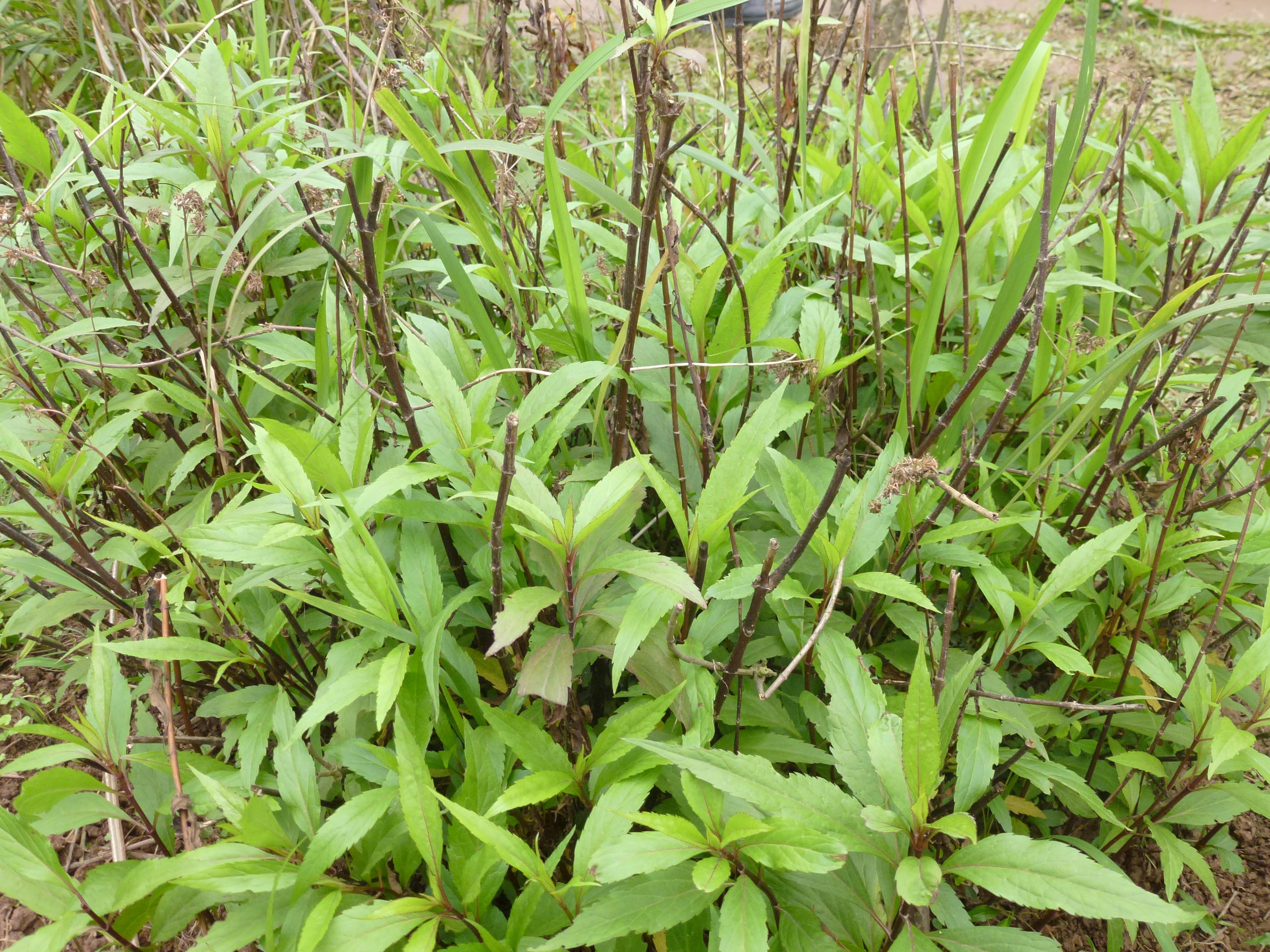
Eupatorium fortunei, in Vietnam Museum of Ethnology

In Chinese, the name is Pei-lan (佩蘭), and in ancient literatures, it is also referred to as Lan-tsao (蘭草).

In Japanese it is known as fujibakama, a term that is also applied to cultivated Eupatorium flowers which have noticeable differences (in leaf shape) from the wild E. fortunei.

== Uses ==
The plant is used medicinally in both Japan and China. In Traditional Chinese Medicine it is indicated for poor appetite, nausea and vomiting due to 'dampness' obstructions or summer heat. Its modern usage includes stomach flus and acute gastritis, in conjunction with other herbs including Huo Xiang (Agastache rugosa).

== Toxicity ==
Eupatorium fortunei contains tumorigenic pyrrolizidine alkaloids.
