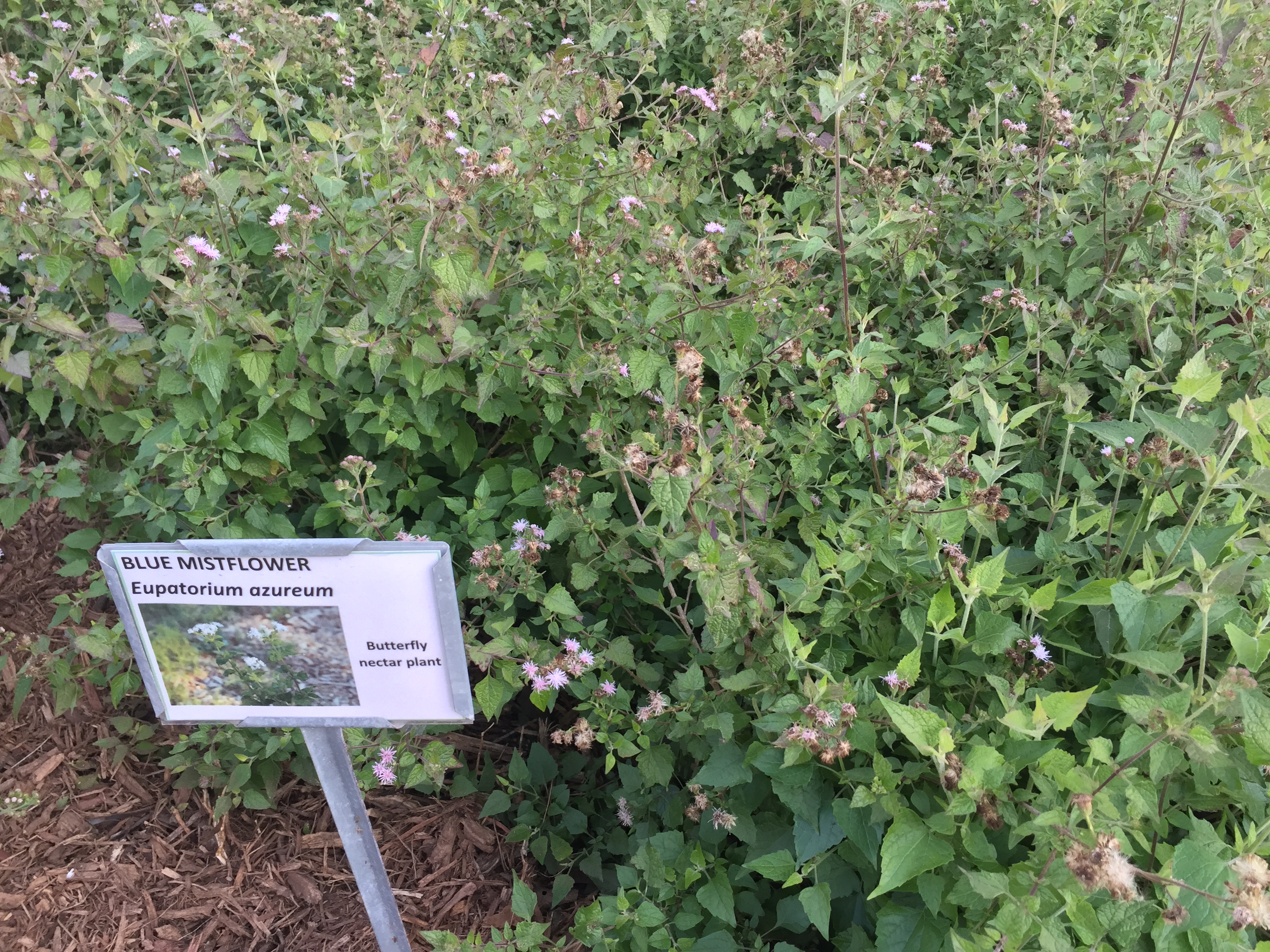

Scientific classification
- Kingdom: Plantae
- Clade: Tracheophytes
- Clade: Angiosperms
- Clade: Eudicots
- Clade: Asterids
- Order: Asterales
- Family: Asteraceae
- Subfamily: Asteroideae
- Tribe: Eupatorieae
- Genus: Tamaulipa; R.M.King & H.Rob.
- Species: T. azurea

Binomial name
- Tamaulipa azurea (DC.) R.M.King & H.Rob.

Synonyms
- Eupatorium azureum DC.; Eupatorium ageratifolium Coulter; Eupatorium ageratifolium var. acuminatum J.M.Coult.; Kyrstenia acuta Greene

= Tamaulipa =

Tamaulipa azurea

Genus of plants

Tamaulipa is a genus of flowering plants in the tribe Eupatorieae within the family Asteraceae. It is monotypic, being represented by the single species Tamaulipa azurea, commonly known as blue boneset. The generic name refers to the State of Tamaulipas in northeastern Mexico, and to the Tamaulipan mezquital scrubland, which covers much of the state. The species also occurs in the extreme southern part of Texas (Hidalgo, Cameron, and Willacy Counties) in the United States. It is a climbing shrub or non-twining vine that grows to about 2 to 3 m (6.6 to 9.8 ft) and has bluish or blue lavender flowers.

It has medicinal value and can be used in beverages.

== Classification ==
Tamaulipa is in the tribe Eupatorieae of the family Asteraceae. Its closest relatives in the tribe are unclear; both Conoclinium and Chromolaena have been proposed.
