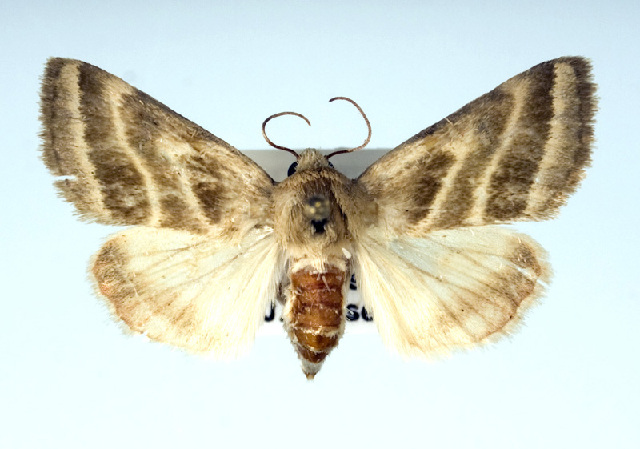

Scientific classification
- Kingdom: Animalia
- Phylum: Arthropoda
- Clade: Pancrustacea
- Class: Insecta
- Order: Lepidoptera
- Superfamily: Noctuoidea
- Family: Noctuidae
- Genus: Schinia
- Species: S. trifascia

Binomial name
- Schinia trifascia Hübner, 1818

= Schinia trifascia =

Species of moth

Schinia trifascia, the three-lined flower moth, is a moth of the family Noctuidae. The species was first described by Jacob Hübner in 1818. It is found in North America from Ontario and Massachusetts south to Florida and west to Arizona, Colorado and Wyoming. It has also been reported from Louisiana.

The wingspan is 20–31 mm. Adults are on wing from July to October. There is one generation per year.

The larvae feed on Brickellia, Eupatorium and Liatris.
