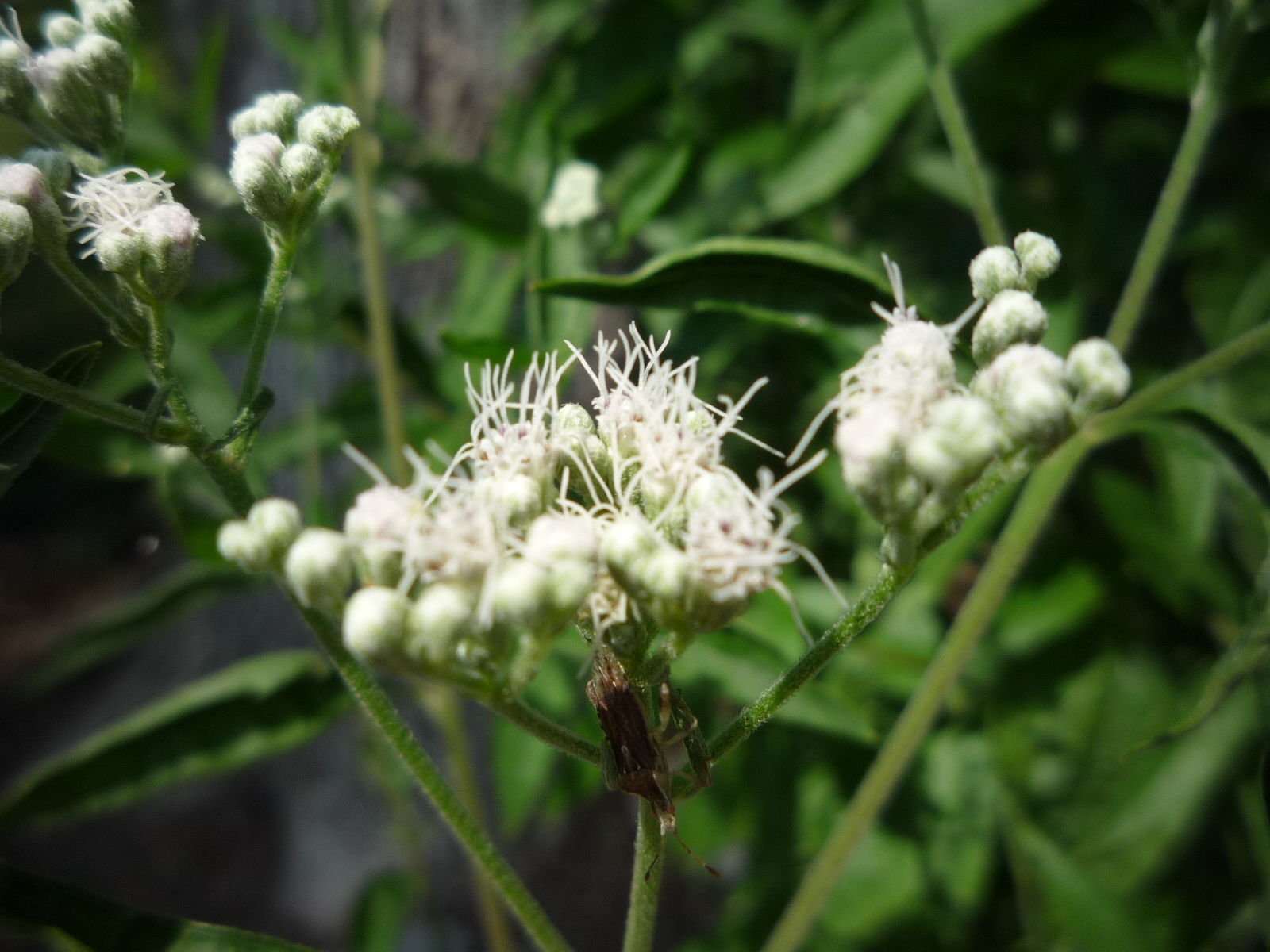

Conservation status
- Secure (NatureServe)

Scientific classification
- Kingdom: Plantae
- Clade: Tracheophytes
- Clade: Angiosperms
- Clade: Eudicots
- Clade: Asterids
- Order: Asterales
- Family: Asteraceae
- Genus: Eupatorium
- Species: E. serotinum

Binomial name
- Eupatorium serotinum Michx.

Synonyms
- Eupatorium ambiguum Hook.; Uncasia serotina Greene

= Eupatorium serotinum =

Species of flowering plant

Eupatorium serotinum, also known as late boneset or late thoroughwort, is a fall-blooming, perennial, herbaceous plant native to North America.

Eupatorium serotinum ranges throughout most of the eastern United States, found in every coastal state from Massachusetts to Texas and inland as far as Minnesota and Nebraska. There are reports of one small population in the Canadian Province of Ontario, and other reports of the species on the south side of the Río Grande in northern Mexico.

Like other members of the genus Eupatorium, Eupatorium serotinum is about one to two meters (40–80 inches) tall. The leaves are typically ovate with serrate margins. The leaf arrangement is alternate, although it can be opposite at some upper nodes. The inflorescence is a flat-topped corymb of many small white flower heads with 9–15 disc florets but no ray florets.

Eupatorium serotinum grows in open sites (either dry or moist), and can hybridize with Eupatorium perfoliatum and other members of the genus Eupatorium. Unlike wind-pollinated plants in this genus, E. serotinum is pollinated by insects.

Eupatorium serotinum provides late-season nectar for monarch butterflies. There is also evidence that pyrrolizidine alkaloids produced by Eupatorium serotinum are beneficial to Monarchs.

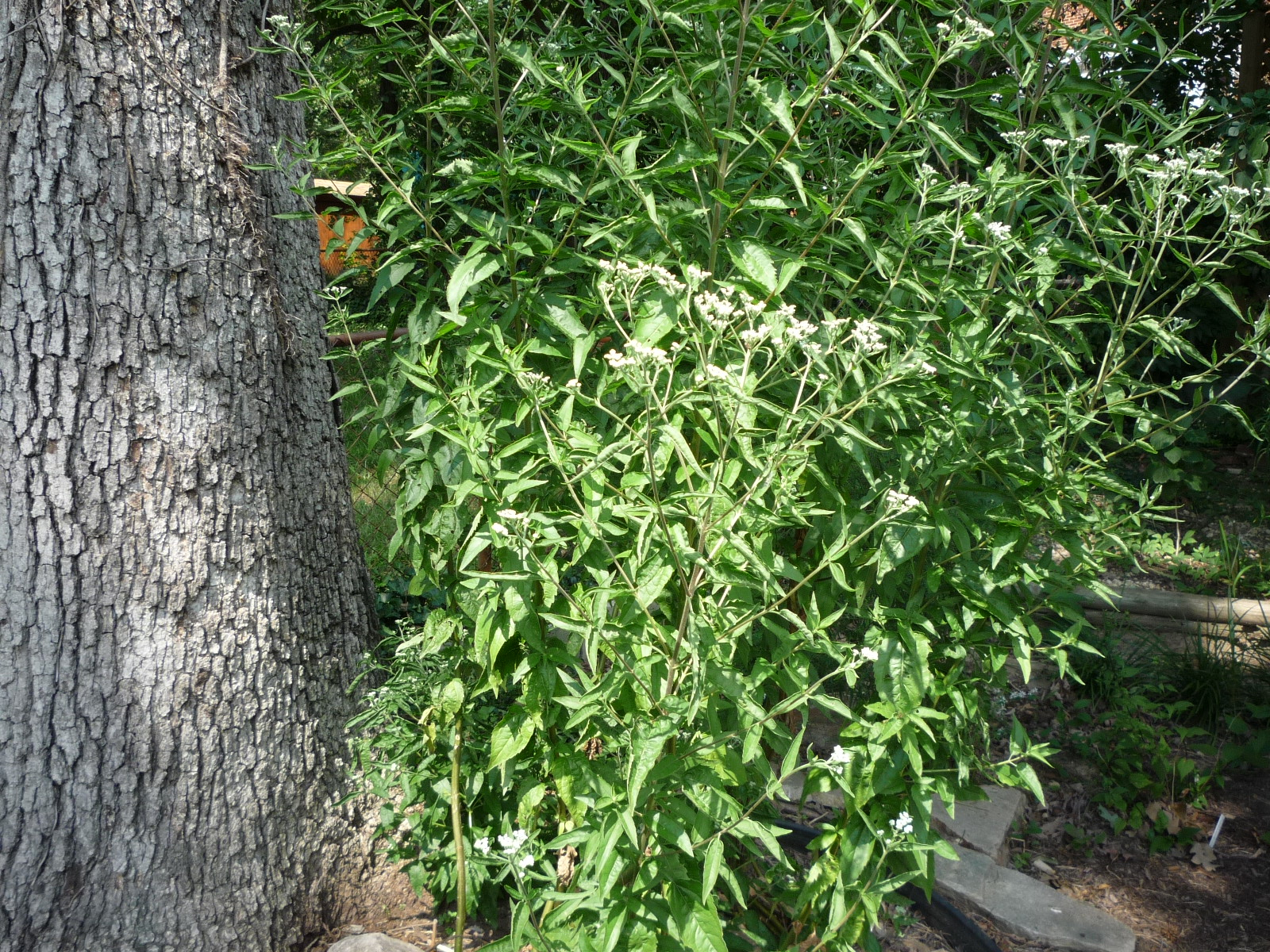
