= C. beatrix =

C. beatrix may refer to:

- Conus beatrix, a sea snail species
- Cosmosoma beatrix, a moth species

== See also ==
- Beatrix (disambiguation)
