= Dichomeris aglaia =

Scientific classification
- Kingdom: Animalia
- Phylum: Arthropoda
- Clade: Pancrustacea
- Class: Insecta
- Order: Lepidoptera
- Family: Gelechiidae
- Genus: Dichomeris
- Species: D. aglaia

Binomial name
- Dichomeris aglaia Hodges, 1986

Species of moth

Dichomeris aglaia is a moth in the family Gelechiidae. It was described by Ronald W. Hodges in 1986. It is found in North America, where it has been recorded from Florida to Texas and in Louisiana, Mississippi, Alabama, North Carolina, South Carolina, Tennessee and West Virginia.

Adults have been recorded on wing year-round in Florida.

The larvae feed on Eupatorium capillifolium.
