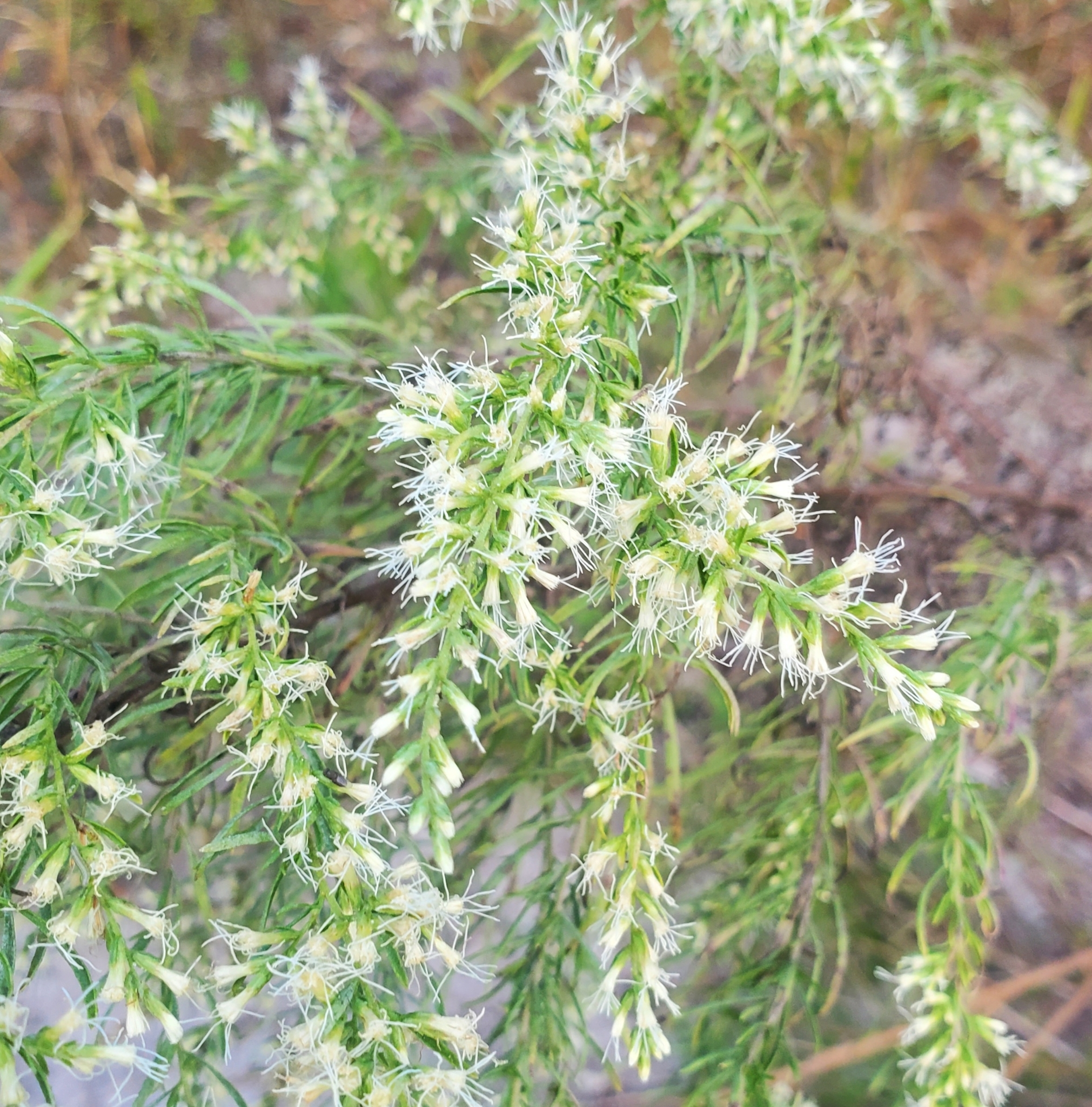

Conservation status
- Secure (NatureServe)

Scientific classification
- Kingdom: Plantae
- Clade: Tracheophytes
- Clade: Angiosperms
- Clade: Eudicots
- Clade: Asterids
- Order: Asterales
- Family: Asteraceae
- Genus: Eupatorium
- Species: E. compositifolium

Binomial name
- Eupatorium compositifolium Walter 1788

Synonyms
- Synonymy: Chrysocoma artemisifolia Poepp. ex Steud.; Chrysocoma coronopifolia (Willd.) Michx.; Eupatorium coronopifolium (Michx.) Willd.; Eupatorium racemosum Bertol.; Traganthes compositifolia (Walter) Greene

= Eupatorium compositifolium =

Yankeeweed

Species of flowering plant

Eupatorium compositifolium, commonly called yankeeweed and coastal dog fennel, is a North American herbaceous perennial plant in the family Asteraceae native to the southern United States (from North Carolina to Florida and Texas). Like other members of the genus Eupatorium it has inflorescences containing a large number of small, white flower heads, each with 5 disc florets but no ray florets. The plant is 0.5 to 2 meters (20-80 inches) tall. Flowers bloom August to October. Its habitats include sand dunes, disturbed areas, and flat-woods.

It is closely related to Eupatorium capillifolium and Eupatorium leptophyllum and some authors consider all of them to be varieties of E. capillifolium. However, E. compositifolium is not as tall as E. capillifolium and is found in drier areas.

Because it is not grazed by livestock, and mostly not eaten by wildlife, it is considered undesirable in places like pastures and controlled by means such as herbicides.

== Distribution and habitat ==
Eupatorium compositifolium is found northeast in North Carolina south to South Florida and west to southeast Oklahoma and Texas. It grows on Longleaf pine sandhills and exposed riverbanks and in sandy disturbed areas and drawdown zones.
