= C. bolivari =

C. bolivari may refer to:

- Catoptria bolivari, a species of moth in the family Crambidae
- Cosmosoma bolivari, a moth in the family Erebidae
