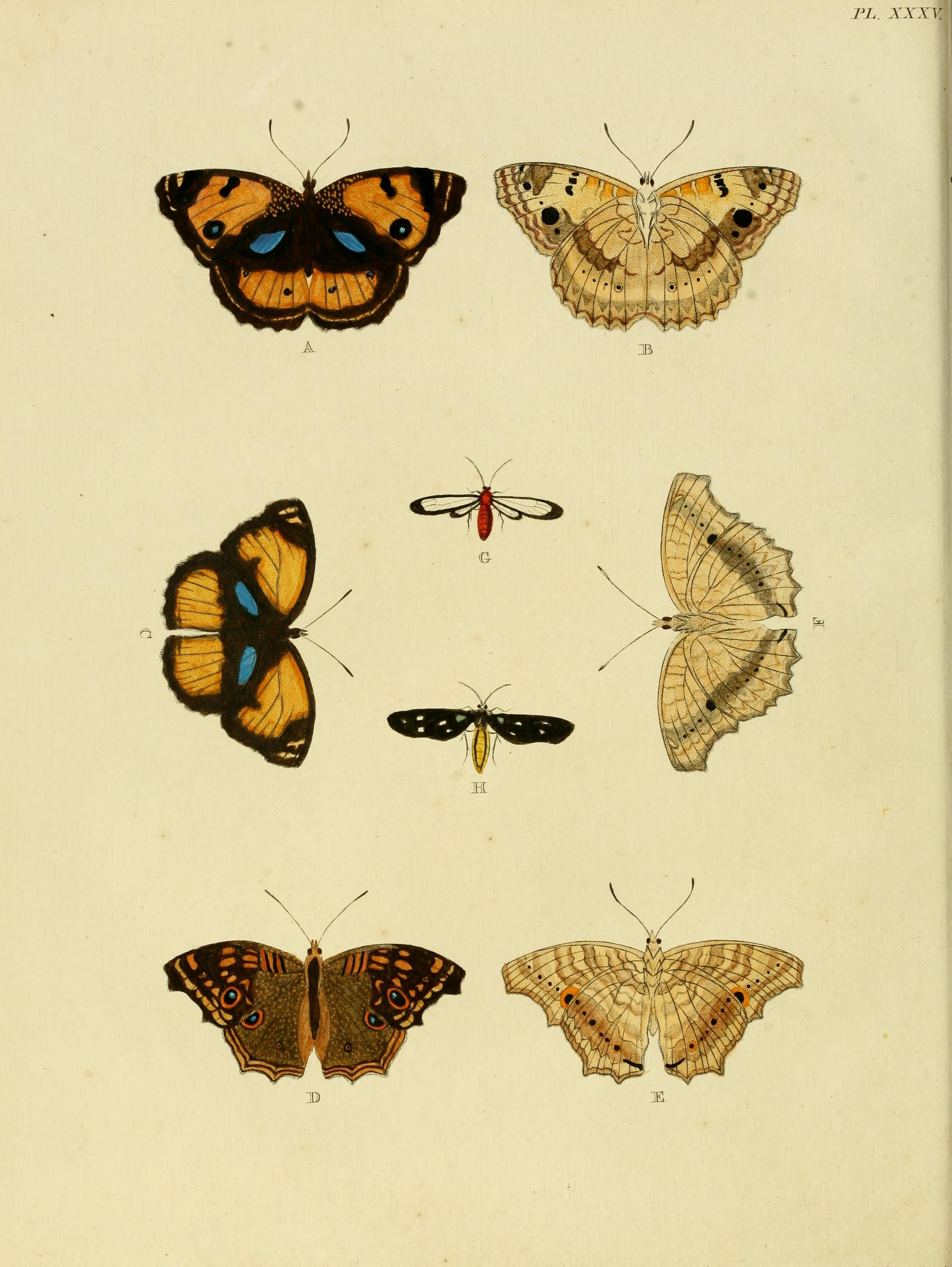
- A, B (female), C (male): Junonia oenone D, E (female), F (male): Junonia lemonias G: (Sphinx) Cosmosoma bromus bromus H: Calonotos phlegmon

Scientific classification
- Domain: Eukaryota
- Kingdom: Animalia
- Phylum: Arthropoda
- Class: Insecta
- Order: Lepidoptera
- Superfamily: Noctuoidea
- Family: Erebidae
- Subfamily: Arctiinae
- Genus: Cosmosoma
- Species: C. bromus

Binomial name
- Cosmosoma bromus (Cramer, [1775])

Synonyms
- Sphinx bromus Cramer, [1775]

= Cosmosoma bromus =

Species of moth

Cosmosoma bromus is a moth of the family Erebidae. It was described by Pieter Cramer in 1775. It is found in Suriname.
