= Calonotos aurata =

Scientific classification
- Kingdom: Animalia
- Phylum: Arthropoda
- Class: Insecta
- Order: Lepidoptera
- Superfamily: Noctuoidea
- Family: Erebidae
- Subfamily: Arctiinae
- Genus: Calonotos
- Species: C. aurata

Binomial name
- Calonotos aurata (Walker, 1854)

Synonyms
- Euchromia aurata Walker, 1854

Species of moth

Calonotos aurata is a moth of the subfamily Arctiinae. It was described by Francis Walker in 1854. It is found in Venezuela.
