= Cosmosoma ignidorsia =

Scientific classification
- Kingdom: Animalia
- Phylum: Arthropoda
- Class: Insecta
- Order: Lepidoptera
- Superfamily: Noctuoidea
- Family: Erebidae
- Subfamily: Arctiinae
- Genus: Cosmosoma
- Species: C. ignidorsia

Binomial name
- Cosmosoma ignidorsia Hampson, 1898

Species of moth

Cosmosoma ignidorsia is a moth of the family Erebidae. It was described by George Hampson in 1898. It is found in Minas Gerais, Brazil.
