= Calonotos tripunctata =

Scientific classification
- Domain: Eukaryota
- Kingdom: Animalia
- Phylum: Arthropoda
- Class: Insecta
- Order: Lepidoptera
- Superfamily: Noctuoidea
- Family: Erebidae
- Subfamily: Arctiinae
- Genus: Calonotos
- Species: C. tripunctata

Binomial name
- Calonotos tripunctata H. Druce, 1898

Species of moth

Calonotos tripunctata is a moth of the subfamily Arctiinae. It was described by Herbert Druce in 1898. It is found in Saint Vincent, Trinidad and the Amazon region.
