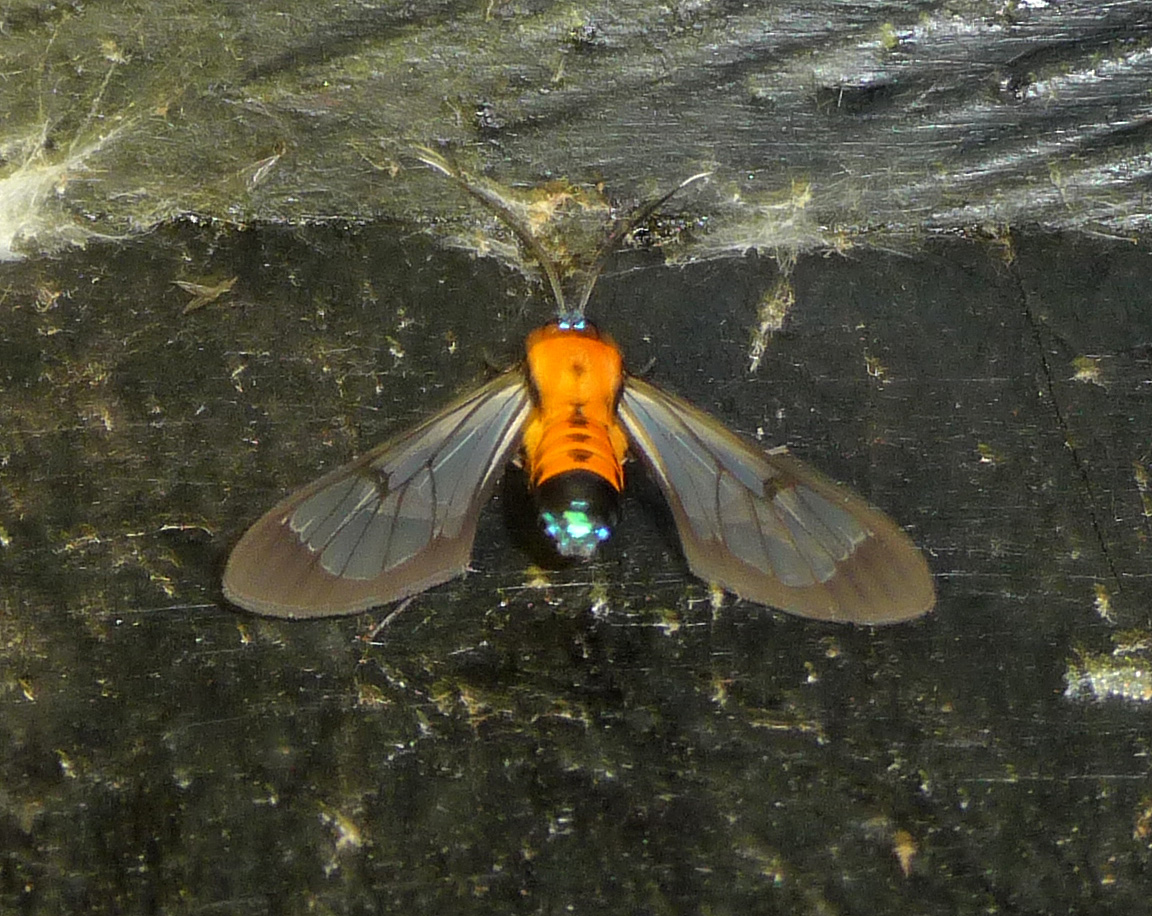

Scientific classification
- Kingdom: Animalia
- Phylum: Arthropoda
- Class: Insecta
- Order: Lepidoptera
- Superfamily: Noctuoidea
- Family: Erebidae
- Subfamily: Arctiinae
- Genus: Cosmosoma
- Species: C. sectinota

Binomial name
- Cosmosoma sectinota Hampson, 1898

= Cosmosoma sectinota =

Species of moth

Cosmosoma sectinota is a moth of the subfamily Arctiinae. It was described by George Hampson in 1898. It is found in Mexico.
