= Cosmosoma annexa =

Scientific classification
- Domain: Eukaryota
- Kingdom: Animalia
- Phylum: Arthropoda
- Class: Insecta
- Order: Lepidoptera
- Superfamily: Noctuoidea
- Family: Erebidae
- Subfamily: Arctiinae
- Genus: Cosmosoma
- Species: C. annexa

Binomial name
- Cosmosoma annexa (Herrich-Schäffer, [1854])

Synonyms
- Laemocharis annexa Herrich-Schäffer, [1854]

Species of moth

Cosmosoma annexa is a moth of the family Erebidae. It was described by Gottlieb August Wilhelm Herrich-Schäffer in 1854. It is found in Rio de Janeiro, Brazil.
