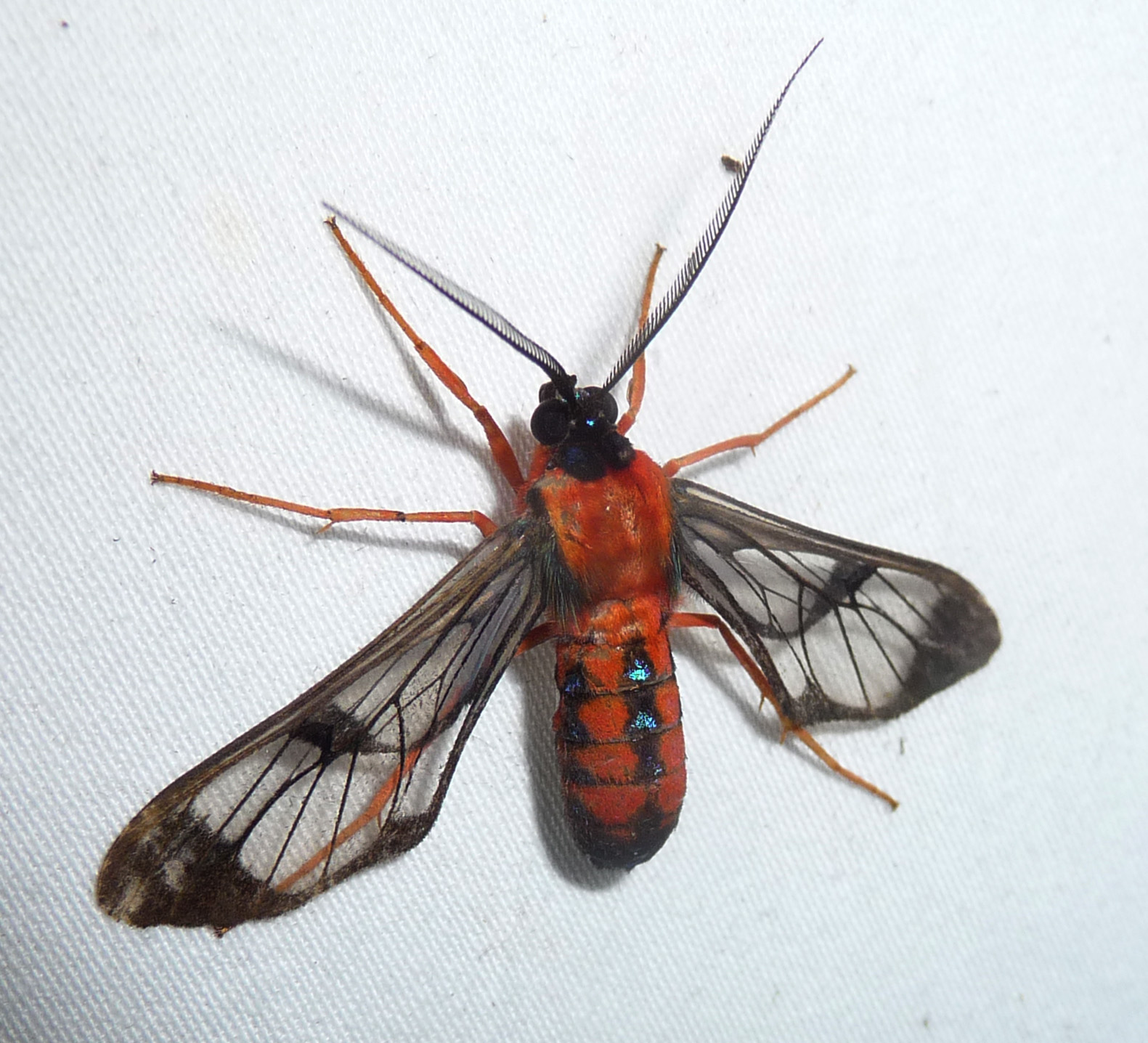

Scientific classification
- Kingdom: Animalia
- Phylum: Arthropoda
- Class: Insecta
- Order: Lepidoptera
- Superfamily: Noctuoidea
- Family: Erebidae
- Subfamily: Arctiinae
- Genus: Cosmosoma
- Species: C. auge

Binomial name
- Cosmosoma auge (Linnaeus, 1767)

Synonyms
- Sphinx auge Linnaeus, 1767; Cosmosoma omphale Hübner, [1823]; Cosmosoma melitta Möschler, 1878

= Cosmosoma auge =

Species of moth

Cosmosoma auge is a moth of the family Erebidae. It was described by Carl Linnaeus in 1767. It is found in Mexico, Panama, Colombia, Suriname, Brazil (São Paulo) and Uruguay, as well as on St. Thomas, Jamaica, Cuba and Puerto Rico.
