= Cosmosoma braconoides =

Scientific classification
- Kingdom: Animalia
- Phylum: Arthropoda
- Class: Insecta
- Order: Lepidoptera
- Superfamily: Noctuoidea
- Family: Erebidae
- Subfamily: Arctiinae
- Genus: Cosmosoma
- Species: C. braconoides

Binomial name
- Cosmosoma braconoides (Walker, 1854)

Synonyms
- Glaucopis braconoides Walker, 1854

Species of moth

Cosmosoma braconoides is a moth of the family Erebidae. It was described by Francis Walker in 1854. It is found in Mexico and Honduras.
