= Cosmosoma telephus =

Scientific classification
- Kingdom: Animalia
- Phylum: Arthropoda
- Class: Insecta
- Order: Lepidoptera
- Superfamily: Noctuoidea
- Family: Erebidae
- Subfamily: Arctiinae
- Genus: Cosmosoma
- Species: C. telephus

Binomial name
- Cosmosoma telephus (Walker, 1854)

Synonyms
- Glaucopis telephus Walker, 1854; Cosmosoma pyrrhostethus Butler, 1876; Cosmosoma coccineum Butler, 1876

Species of moth

Cosmosoma telephus is a moth of the subfamily Arctiinae. It was described by Francis Walker in 1854. It is found in Colombia, Venezuela and Espírito Santo, Brazil.
