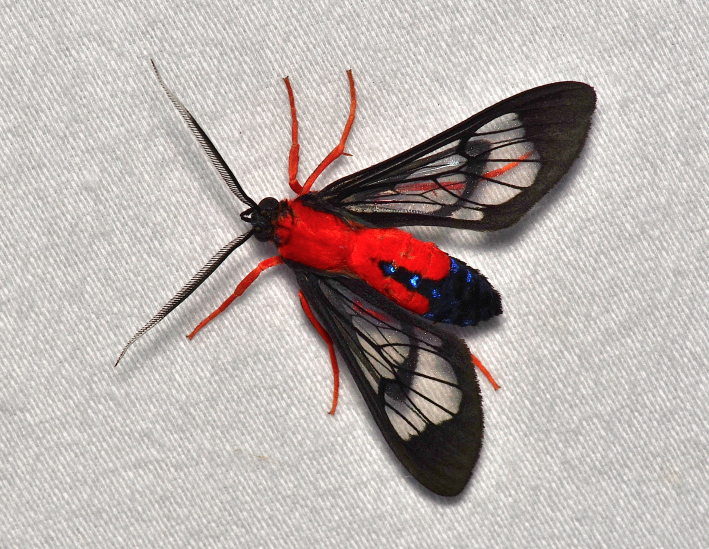
- Cosmosoma myrodora

Scientific classification
- Kingdom: Animalia
- Phylum: Arthropoda
- Clade: Pancrustacea
- Class: Insecta
- Order: Lepidoptera
- Superfamily: Noctuoidea
- Family: Erebidae
- Subfamily: Arctiinae
- Tribe: Arctiini
- Subtribe: Euchromiina
- Genus: Cosmosoma; Hübner, [1823]

Synonyms
- Ilipa Walker, 1854; Mirandisca Travassos, 1955 (disputed); Bombopsyche Hampson, 1898; Sphecomimax Bryk, 1953; Rezia Kirby, 1892

= Cosmosoma =

Genus of moths

Cosmosoma is a genus of tiger moths in the subfamily Arctiinae. The genus was erected by Jacob Hübner in 1823.

== Species ==
- Cosmosoma achemon (Fabricius, 1781)
- Cosmosoma achemonides Dognin, 1907
- Cosmosoma admota (Herrich-Schäffer, [1854])
- Cosmosoma advena Druce, 1884
- Cosmosoma annexa (Herrich-Schäffer, [1854])
- Cosmosoma auge (Linnaeus, 1767)
- Cosmosoma aurifera (Klages, 1906)
- Cosmosoma batesii (Butler, 1876)
- Cosmosoma beata (Butler, 1876)
- Cosmosoma beatrix (Druce, 1884)
- Cosmosoma biseriatum Schaus, 1898
- Cosmosoma bogotensis (Felder, 1874)
- Cosmosoma bolivari Schaus, 1898
- Cosmosoma braconoides (Walker, 1854)
- Cosmosoma bromus (Cramer, [1775])
- Cosmosoma caecum Hampson, 1898
- Cosmosoma centralis (Walker, 1854)
- Cosmosoma cincta (Schaus, 1894)
- Cosmosoma consolata (Walker, 1856)
- Cosmosoma contracta (Walker, 1856)
- Cosmosoma demantria Druce, 1895
- Cosmosoma determinata (Butler, 1876)
- Cosmosoma dorsimacula Schaus, 1898
- Cosmosoma durca Schaus, 1896
- Cosmosoma elegans Butler, 1876
- Cosmosoma ethodaea Druce, 1889
- Cosmosoma eumelis (Druce, 1883)
- Cosmosoma evadnes (Stoll, [1781])
- Cosmosoma fenestrata (Drury, [1773])
- Cosmosoma festivum (Walker, 1854)
- Cosmosoma flavicornis (Druce, 1883)
- Cosmosoma flavitarsis (Walker, 1854)
- Cosmosoma galatea Schaus, 1912
- Cosmosoma gaza (Schaus, 1892)
- Cosmosoma gemmata (Butler, 1876)
- Cosmosoma hector Staudinger, 1876
- Cosmosoma hercyna (Druce, 1884)
- Cosmosoma hypocheilus Hampson, 1898
- Cosmosoma ignidorsia Hampson, 1898
- Cosmosoma impar (Walker, 1854)
- Cosmosoma intensa (Walker, 1854)
- Cosmosoma joavana Schaus, 1924
- Cosmosoma juanita Neumoegen, 1894
- Cosmosoma ladan (Druce, 1896)
- Cosmosoma leuconoton Hampson, 1898
- Cosmosoma lycopolis (Druce, 1883)
- Cosmosoma melanopera Hampson, 1898
- Cosmosoma metallescens (Ménétriés, 1857)
- Cosmosoma myrodora Dyar, 1907 – scarlet-bodied wasp moth
- Cosmosoma nelea Möschler, 1878
- Cosmosoma nigricornis (Fabricius, 1787)
- Cosmosoma oratha (Druce, 1893)
- Cosmosoma orathidia Druce, 1898
- Cosmosoma pheres (Stoll, [1782])
- Cosmosoma plutona Schaus, 1894
- Cosmosoma protus Druce, 1894
- Cosmosoma pudica Druce, 1894
- Cosmosoma quinquepuncta (Heylaerts, 1890)
- Cosmosoma regia (Schaus, 1894)
- Cosmosoma remota (Walker, 1854)
- Cosmosoma ruatana (Druce, 1888)
- Cosmosoma salvini (Butler, 1876)
- Cosmosoma saron Druce, 1884
- Cosmosoma scita (Walker, 1856)
- Cosmosoma sectinota Hampson, 1898
- Cosmosoma semifulva (Druce, 1884)
- Cosmosoma sephela (Druce, 1883)
- Cosmosoma seraphina (Herrich-Schäffer, 1854)
- Cosmosoma stilbosticta (Butler, 1876) [see recent misspelling "stibosticta"]
- Cosmosoma stryma (Druce, 1884)
- Cosmosoma subflamma (Walker, 1854)
- Cosmosoma tarapotensis (Druce, 1897)
- Cosmosoma telephus (Walker, 1854)
- Cosmosoma tengyra (Walker, 1854)
- Cosmosoma teuthras (Walker, 1854)
- Cosmosoma tigris Schaus, 1894
- Cosmosoma vesparia (Perty, 1834)
- Cosmosoma xanthistis Hampson, 1898
- Cosmosoma xanthocera Hampson, 1898
- Cosmosoma xanthostictum Hampson, 1898
- Cosmosoma zurcheri Druce, 1894
