= Cosmosoma hector =

Scientific classification
- Domain: Eukaryota
- Kingdom: Animalia
- Phylum: Arthropoda
- Class: Insecta
- Order: Lepidoptera
- Superfamily: Noctuoidea
- Family: Erebidae
- Subfamily: Arctiinae
- Genus: Cosmosoma
- Species: C. hector

Binomial name
- Cosmosoma hector Staudinger, 1876

Species of moth

Cosmosoma hector is a moth of the family Erebidae. It was described by Otto Staudinger in 1876. It is found in Panama.
