= Cosmosoma aurifera =

Scientific classification
- Domain: Eukaryota
- Kingdom: Animalia
- Phylum: Arthropoda
- Class: Insecta
- Order: Lepidoptera
- Superfamily: Noctuoidea
- Family: Erebidae
- Subfamily: Arctiinae
- Genus: Cosmosoma
- Species: C. aurifera

Binomial name
- Cosmosoma aurifera (Klages, 1906)

Synonyms
- Pseudosphex aurifera Klages, 1906

Species of moth

Cosmosoma aurifera is a moth of the family Erebidae. It was described by Edward A. Klages in 1906. It is found in Venezuela.
