= Cosmosoma galatea =

Scientific classification
- Domain: Eukaryota
- Kingdom: Animalia
- Phylum: Arthropoda
- Class: Insecta
- Order: Lepidoptera
- Superfamily: Noctuoidea
- Family: Erebidae
- Subfamily: Arctiinae
- Genus: Cosmosoma
- Species: C. galatea

Binomial name
- Cosmosoma galatea Schaus, 1912

Species of moth

Cosmosoma galatea is a moth of the family Erebidae. It was described by William Schaus in 1912. It is found in Costa Rica and Peru.
