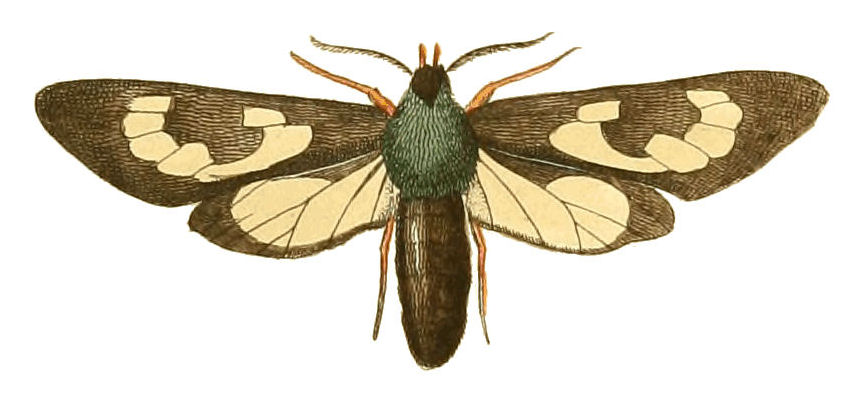

Scientific classification
- Domain: Eukaryota
- Kingdom: Animalia
- Phylum: Arthropoda
- Class: Insecta
- Order: Lepidoptera
- Superfamily: Noctuoidea
- Family: Erebidae
- Subfamily: Arctiinae
- Genus: Cosmosoma
- Species: C. fenestrata

Binomial name
- Cosmosoma fenestrata (Drury, [1773])

Synonyms
- Sphinx fenestrata Drury, [1773]; Sphinx steropes Goeze, 1780; Glaucopis rubripeda Lucas, 1857

= Cosmosoma fenestrata =

Species of moth

Cosmosoma fenestrata is a moth of the family Erebidae. It was described by Dru Drury in 1773. It is found on Jamaica and Cuba.

== Description ==
Upperside: Antennae nearly black and pectinated (comb like). Head and eyes black. Palpi small and long, and of a fine scarlet. Tongue spiral. Thorax blueish green, almost black. Abdomen dark brown. Anterior wings the same, the middle part being perfectly transparent like glass, wherein is a dark cloud which is joined to the anterior margin. Posterior wings small, transparent, with a dark brown narrow border running round their edges, which at the upper corners is broad where it becomes cloud like.

Underside: Breast dark brown. Legs and thighs scarlet, which colour extends along the middle of the abdomen, almost to the tail, where it becomes a little fainter, being crossed by the rings of the abdomen, which are black and very narrow. All the wings of the same colour as on the upperside.
