= Cosmosoma gaza =

Scientific classification
- Domain: Eukaryota
- Kingdom: Animalia
- Phylum: Arthropoda
- Class: Insecta
- Order: Lepidoptera
- Superfamily: Noctuoidea
- Family: Erebidae
- Subfamily: Arctiinae
- Genus: Cosmosoma
- Species: C. gaza

Binomial name
- Cosmosoma gaza (Schaus, 1892)

Synonyms
- Gymnelia gaza (Schaus, 1892); Isanthrene gaza Schaus, 1892

Species of moth

Cosmosoma gaza is a moth of the family Erebidae. It was described by William Schaus in 1892. It is found in Peru.
