= Cosmosoma cincta =

Scientific classification
- Domain: Eukaryota
- Kingdom: Animalia
- Phylum: Arthropoda
- Class: Insecta
- Order: Lepidoptera
- Superfamily: Noctuoidea
- Family: Erebidae
- Subfamily: Arctiinae
- Genus: Cosmosoma
- Species: C. cincta

Binomial name
- Cosmosoma cincta (Schaus, 1894)

Synonyms
- Homoeocera cincta Schaus, 1894

Species of moth

Cosmosoma cincta is a moth of the family Erebidae. It was described by William Schaus in 1894. It is found in Venezuela.
