= Cosmosoma hypocheilus =

Scientific classification
- Kingdom: Animalia
- Phylum: Arthropoda
- Class: Insecta
- Order: Lepidoptera
- Superfamily: Noctuoidea
- Family: Erebidae
- Subfamily: Arctiinae
- Genus: Cosmosoma
- Species: C. hypocheilus

Binomial name
- Cosmosoma hypocheilus Hampson, 1898

Species of moth

Cosmosoma hypocheilus is a moth of the family Erebidae. It was described by George Hampson in 1898. It is found on St. Vincent, an island in the Caribbean Sea.
