= Cosmosoma dorsimacula =

Scientific classification
- Domain: Eukaryota
- Kingdom: Animalia
- Phylum: Arthropoda
- Class: Insecta
- Order: Lepidoptera
- Superfamily: Noctuoidea
- Family: Erebidae
- Subfamily: Arctiinae
- Genus: Cosmosoma
- Species: C. dorsimacula

Binomial name
- Cosmosoma dorsimacula Schaus, 1898

Species of moth

Cosmosoma dorsimacula is a moth of the family Erebidae. It was described by William Schaus in 1898. It is found in Ecuador.
