= Cosmosoma intensa =

Scientific classification
- Domain: Eukaryota
- Kingdom: Animalia
- Phylum: Arthropoda
- Class: Insecta
- Order: Lepidoptera
- Superfamily: Noctuoidea
- Family: Erebidae
- Subfamily: Arctiinae
- Genus: Cosmosoma
- Species: C. intensa

Binomial name
- Cosmosoma intensa Rothschild, 1910

Species of moth

Cosmosoma intensa is a moth of the family Erebidae. It was described by Walter Rothschild, 2nd Baron Rothschild, in 1910. It is found in Colombia.
