= Cosmosoma xanthistis =

Scientific classification
- Kingdom: Animalia
- Phylum: Arthropoda
- Class: Insecta
- Order: Lepidoptera
- Superfamily: Noctuoidea
- Family: Erebidae
- Subfamily: Arctiinae
- Genus: Cosmosoma
- Species: C. xanthistis

Binomial name
- Cosmosoma xanthistis Hampson, 1898

Species of moth

Cosmosoma xanthistis is a moth of the subfamily Arctiinae. It was described by George Hampson in 1898. It is found in São Paulo, Brazil.
