= Cosmosoma zurcheri =

Scientific classification
- Domain: Eukaryota
- Kingdom: Animalia
- Phylum: Arthropoda
- Class: Insecta
- Order: Lepidoptera
- Superfamily: Noctuoidea
- Family: Erebidae
- Subfamily: Arctiinae
- Genus: Cosmosoma
- Species: C. zurcheri

Binomial name
- Cosmosoma zurcheri H. Druce, 1894

Species of moth

Cosmosoma zurcheri is a moth of the subfamily Arctiinae. It was described by Herbert Druce in 1894. It is found in Costa Rica.
