= Cosmosoma xanthostictum =

Scientific classification
- Kingdom: Animalia
- Phylum: Arthropoda
- Class: Insecta
- Order: Lepidoptera
- Superfamily: Noctuoidea
- Family: Erebidae
- Subfamily: Arctiinae
- Genus: Cosmosoma
- Species: C. xanthostictum

Binomial name
- Cosmosoma xanthostictum Hampson, 1898

Synonyms
- Cosmosoma metallescens Druce, 1884 (preocc. Ménétriés, 1857)

Species of moth

Cosmosoma xanthostictum is a moth of the subfamily Arctiinae. It was described by George Hampson in 1898. It is found in Mexico, Guatemala and Panama.
