= Cosmosoma flavitarsis =

Scientific classification
- Kingdom: Animalia
- Phylum: Arthropoda
- Class: Insecta
- Order: Lepidoptera
- Superfamily: Noctuoidea
- Family: Erebidae
- Subfamily: Arctiinae
- Genus: Cosmosoma
- Species: C. flavitarsis

Binomial name
- Cosmosoma flavitarsis (Walker, 1854)

Synonyms
- Glaucopis flavitarsis Walker, 1854; Laemocharis scintillans Herrich-Schäffer, [1854]; Gymnelia flavitarsis (Walker, 1854)

Species of moth

Cosmosoma flavitarsis is a moth of the family Erebidae. It was described by Francis Walker in 1854. It is found in Colombia and Venezuela.
