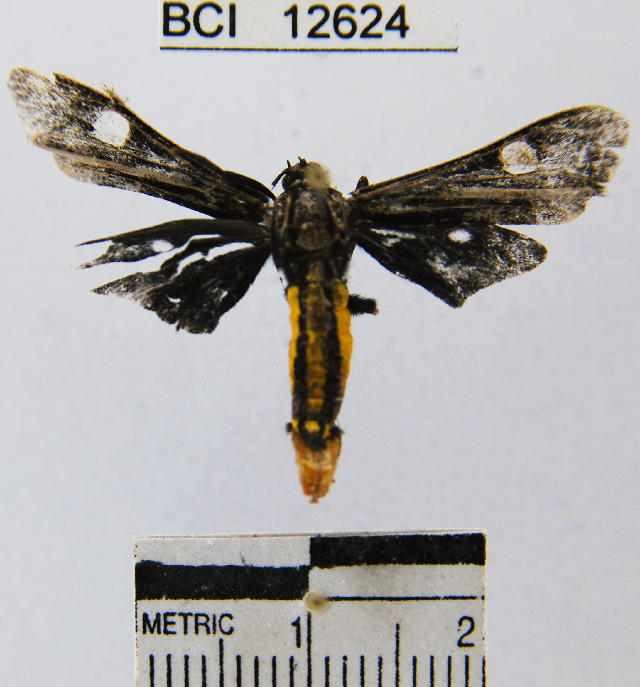

Scientific classification
- Domain: Eukaryota
- Kingdom: Animalia
- Phylum: Arthropoda
- Class: Insecta
- Order: Lepidoptera
- Superfamily: Noctuoidea
- Family: Erebidae
- Subfamily: Arctiinae
- Genus: Calonotos
- Species: C. metallicus

Binomial name
- Calonotos metallicus H. Druce, 1886

= Calonotos metallicus =

Species of moth

Calonotos metallicus is a moth of the subfamily Arctiinae. It was described by Herbert Druce in 1886. It is found in Panama.
