= Cosmosoma centralis =

Scientific classification
- Kingdom: Animalia
- Phylum: Arthropoda
- Class: Insecta
- Order: Lepidoptera
- Superfamily: Noctuoidea
- Family: Erebidae
- Subfamily: Arctiinae
- Genus: Cosmosoma
- Species: C. centralis

Binomial name
- Cosmosoma centralis (Walker, 1854)

Synonyms
- Glaucopis centralis Walker, 1854; Laemocharis bura Herrich-Schäffer, [1854]

Species of moth

Cosmosoma centralis is a moth of the family Erebidae. It was described by Francis Walker in 1854. It is found in Brazil (Rio de Janeiro, São Paulo).
