= Cosmosoma nigricornis =

Scientific classification
- Domain: Eukaryota
- Kingdom: Animalia
- Phylum: Arthropoda
- Class: Insecta
- Order: Lepidoptera
- Superfamily: Noctuoidea
- Family: Erebidae
- Subfamily: Arctiinae
- Genus: Cosmosoma
- Species: C. nigricornis

Binomial name
- Cosmosoma nigricornis (Fabricius, 1787)

Synonyms
- Zygaena nigricornis Fabricius, 1787; Homoeocera stretchii Butler, 1876; Gymnelia nigricornis (Fabricius, 1787)

Species of moth

Cosmosoma nigricornis is a moth of the subfamily Arctiinae. It was described by Johan Christian Fabricius in 1787. It is found in Colombia.
