= Calonotos =

Scientific classification
- Kingdom: Animalia
- Phylum: Arthropoda
- Clade: Pancrustacea
- Class: Insecta
- Order: Lepidoptera
- Superfamily: Noctuoidea
- Family: Erebidae
- Subfamily: Arctiinae
- Genus: Calonotos; Hübner, [1819]

Genus of moths

Calonotos is a genus of moths in the subfamily Arctiinae. The genus was erected by Jacob Hübner in 1819.

== Species ==
- Calonotos acutipennis (Zerny, 1931) Brazil (Para)
- Calonotos aequimaculatus (Zerny, 1931) Brazil (Para)
- Calonotos angustipennis (Zerny, 1931) Brazil (Para)
- Calonotos antennata Rothschild, 1911 Venezuela
- Calonotos aurata (Walker, 1854) Venezuela
- Calonotos chalcipleura Hampson, 1898 Venezuela, Brazil (Para)
- Calonotos chlorota (Dognin, 1914) Colombia
- Calonotos craneae Fleming, 1957 Trinidad
- Calonotos dorata (Dognin, 1897) Colombia, Bolivia, Ecuador
- Calonotos helymus (Cramer, [1775]) Suriname
- Calonotos hoffmannsi Rothschild, 1911 Brazil (Amazonas)
- Calonotos longipennis Rothschild, 1911 Suriname
- Calonotos metallicus Druce, 1886 Panama, Costa Rica
- Calonotos niger (Gaede, 1926) Brazil (Amazonas)
- Calonotos opalizans Rothschild, 1911 Venezuela
- Calonotos phlegmon (Cramer, [1775]) Suriname, Amazons (Amazonas, Para)
- Calonotos plumulatus Klages, 1906 Venezuela
- Calonotos rectifascia Talbot, 1932 Colombia
- Calonotos tiburtus (Cramer, [1779]) Costa Rica, Panama, Guiana, Suriname
- Calonotos triplaga Hampson, 1909 French Guiana, Brazil (Amazonas, Para)
- Calonotos tripunctata Druce, 1898 St. Vincent, Trinidad, Amazon
