= Cosmosoma contracta =

Scientific classification
- Kingdom: Animalia
- Phylum: Arthropoda
- Clade: Pancrustacea
- Class: Insecta
- Order: Lepidoptera
- Superfamily: Noctuoidea
- Family: Erebidae
- Subfamily: Arctiinae
- Genus: Cosmosoma
- Species: C. contracta

Binomial name
- Cosmosoma contracta (Walker, 1856)

Synonyms
- Laemocharis contracta Walker, 1856

Species of moth

Cosmosoma contracta is a moth of the family Erebidae. It was described by Francis Walker in 1856. It is found in São Paulo, Brazil.
