= Cosmosoma nelea =

Scientific classification
- Kingdom: Animalia
- Phylum: Arthropoda
- Class: Insecta
- Order: Lepidoptera
- Superfamily: Noctuoidea
- Family: Erebidae
- Subfamily: Arctiinae
- Genus: Cosmosoma
- Species: C. nelea

Binomial name
- Cosmosoma nelea Möschler, 1878

Species of moth

Cosmosoma nelea is a moth of the subfamily Arctiinae. It was described by Heinrich Benno Möschler in 1878. It is found in Suriname.
