= Cosmosoma evadnes =

Scientific classification
- Domain: Eukaryota
- Kingdom: Animalia
- Phylum: Arthropoda
- Class: Insecta
- Order: Lepidoptera
- Superfamily: Noctuoidea
- Family: Erebidae
- Subfamily: Arctiinae
- Genus: Cosmosoma
- Species: C. evadnes

Binomial name
- Cosmosoma evadnes (Stoll, [1781])

Synonyms
- Sphinx evadnes Stoll, [1781]

Species of moth

Cosmosoma evadnes is a moth of the family Erebidae. It was described by Caspar Stoll in 1781. It is found in Suriname.
