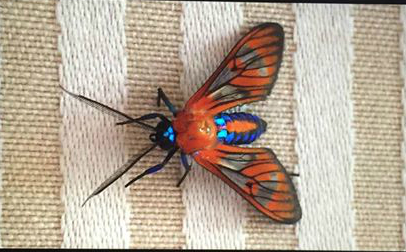

Scientific classification
- Domain: Eukaryota
- Kingdom: Animalia
- Phylum: Arthropoda
- Class: Insecta
- Order: Lepidoptera
- Superfamily: Noctuoidea
- Family: Erebidae
- Subfamily: Arctiinae
- Genus: Cosmosoma
- Species: C. achemon

Binomial name
- Cosmosoma achemon (Fabricius, 1781)

Synonyms
- Zygaena achemon Fabricius, 1781; Euchromia tyrrhene Hübner, 1824; Cosmosoma voltumna Druce, 1897

= Cosmosoma achemon =

Species of moth

Cosmosoma achemon is a moth of the family Erebidae. It was described by Johan Christian Fabricius in 1781. It is found from the Antilles to Santarém in Pará, Brazil.
