= Calonotos tiburtus =

Scientific classification
- Domain: Eukaryota
- Kingdom: Animalia
- Phylum: Arthropoda
- Class: Insecta
- Order: Lepidoptera
- Superfamily: Noctuoidea
- Family: Erebidae
- Subfamily: Arctiinae
- Genus: Calonotos
- Species: C. tiburtus

Binomial name
- Calonotos tiburtus (Cramer, 1779)

Synonyms
- Sphinx tiburtus Cramer, [1779]; Euchromia tiburtus; Calonotos tiburtus f. trinitatis Strand

Species of moth

Calonotos tiburtus is a moth of the subfamily Arctiinae. It was described by Pieter Cramer in 1779. It is found in Costa Rica, Panama, Guyana and Suriname.
