= Cosmosoma scita =

Scientific classification
- Kingdom: Animalia
- Phylum: Arthropoda
- Class: Insecta
- Order: Lepidoptera
- Superfamily: Noctuoidea
- Family: Erebidae
- Subfamily: Arctiinae
- Genus: Cosmosoma
- Species: C. scita

Binomial name
- Cosmosoma scita (Walker, 1856)

Synonyms
- Ilipa scita Walker, 1856; Poecilosoma hilaris Walker, [1865]

Species of moth

Cosmosoma scita is a moth of the subfamily Arctiinae. It was described by Francis Walker in 1856. It is found in the Amazon region.
