= Cosmosoma subflamma =

Scientific classification
- Kingdom: Animalia
- Phylum: Arthropoda
- Class: Insecta
- Order: Lepidoptera
- Superfamily: Noctuoidea
- Family: Erebidae
- Subfamily: Arctiinae
- Genus: Cosmosoma
- Species: C. subflamma

Binomial name
- Cosmosoma subflamma (Walker, 1854)

Synonyms
- Glaucopis subflamma Walker, 1854; Laemocharis panopes Herrich-Schäffer, [1854]

Species of moth

Cosmosoma subflamma is a moth of the subfamily Arctiinae. It was described by Francis Walker in 1854. It is found in Brazil and on Santa Lucia.

== Subspecies ==
- Cosmosoma subflamma subflamma (Brazil)
- Cosmosoma subflamma lucia Schaus, 1896 (Santa Lucia)
