= Cosmosoma semifulva =

Scientific classification
- Domain: Eukaryota
- Kingdom: Animalia
- Phylum: Arthropoda
- Class: Insecta
- Order: Lepidoptera
- Superfamily: Noctuoidea
- Family: Erebidae
- Subfamily: Arctiinae
- Genus: Cosmosoma
- Species: C. semifulva

Binomial name
- Cosmosoma semifulva (H. Druce, 1884)

Synonyms
- Dycladia semifulva H. Druce, 1884

Species of moth

Cosmosoma semifulva is a moth of the subfamily Arctiinae. It was described by Herbert Druce in 1884. It is found in Mexico.
