= Cosmosoma gemmata =

Scientific classification
- Domain: Eukaryota
- Kingdom: Animalia
- Phylum: Arthropoda
- Class: Insecta
- Order: Lepidoptera
- Superfamily: Noctuoidea
- Family: Erebidae
- Subfamily: Arctiinae
- Genus: Cosmosoma
- Species: C. gemmata

Binomial name
- Cosmosoma gemmata (Butler, 1876)

Synonyms
- Pheia gemmata Butler, 1876

Species of moth

Cosmosoma gemmata is a moth of the family Erebidae. It was described by Arthur Gardiner Butler in 1876. It is found in Panama and Colombia.
