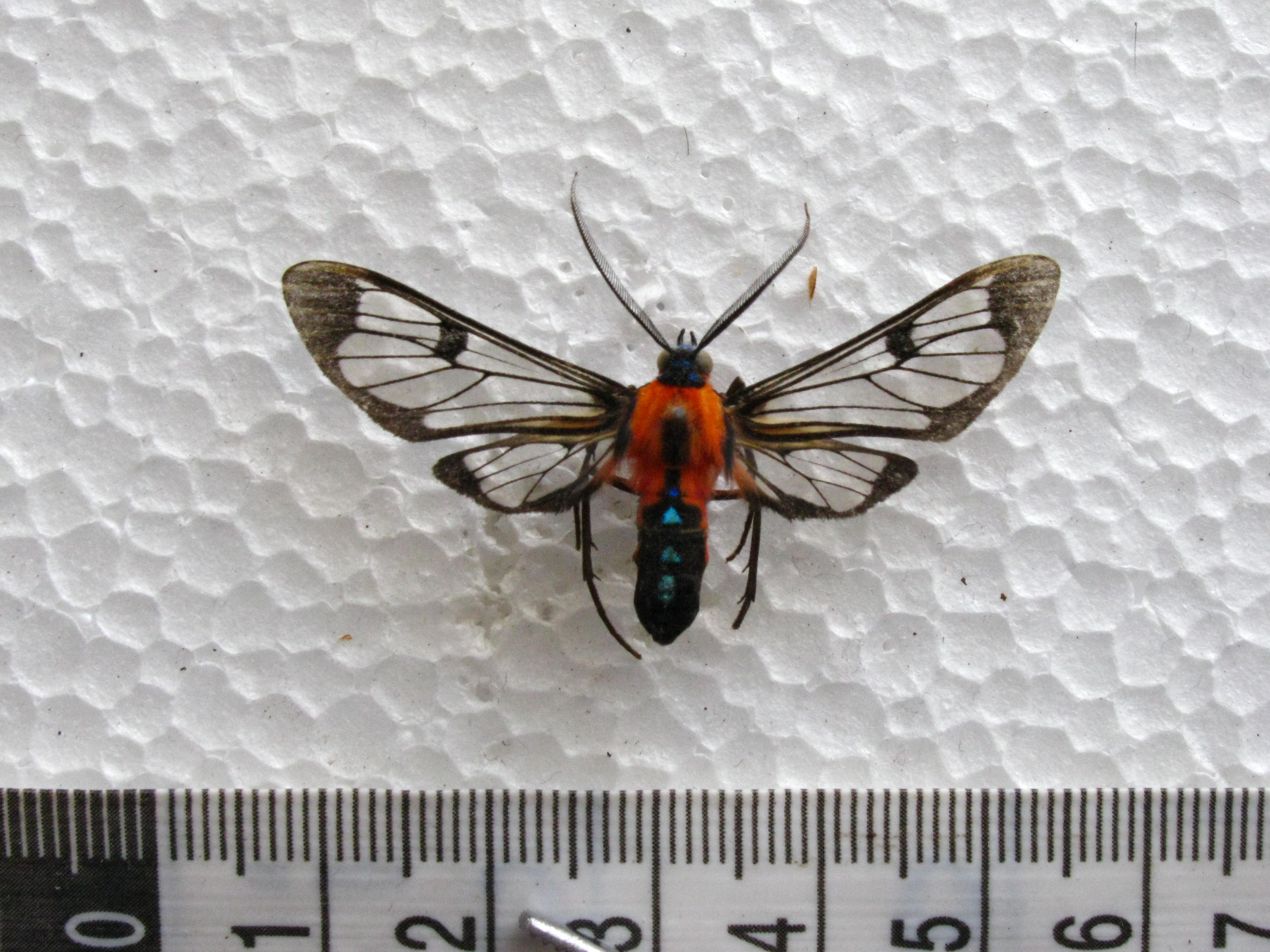
- Dorsal view of C. impar, from Zacapoaxtla, Puebla, Mexico.

Scientific classification
- Kingdom: Animalia
- Phylum: Arthropoda
- Class: Insecta
- Order: Lepidoptera
- Superfamily: Noctuoidea
- Family: Erebidae
- Subfamily: Arctiinae
- Genus: Cosmosoma
- Species: C. impar

Binomial name
- Cosmosoma impar (Walker, 1854)

Synonyms
- Glaucopis impar Walker, 1854; Cosmosoma vernana Druce, 1897

= Cosmosoma impar =

Species of moth

Cosmosoma impar is a moth of the family Erebidae. It was described by Francis Walker in 1854. It is found in Mexico,

Guatemala and Panama.

== Description ==
Head black, with metallic blue markings on frons and vertex; thorax orange; tegulae and patagia edged with black and with metallic blue points; legs black, coxae orange; abdomen black, with lateral orange patches at base and lateral orange streaks at 2nd, 3rd and 4th segments; a dorsal series of metallic blue spots and lateral spots on the terminal segments; the channeled valve of male fringed with white; wings hyaline, the veins and margins black. forewing with large discocellular black spot. A yellowish streak on basal half of inner area; the terminal band very wide on the apical area and expanding at tornus. Hind wing with terminal band very wide on the apical area and at tornus. Wingspan of 46mm average.
