= Cosmosoma ethodaea =

Scientific classification
- Domain: Eukaryota
- Kingdom: Animalia
- Phylum: Arthropoda
- Class: Insecta
- Order: Lepidoptera
- Superfamily: Noctuoidea
- Family: Erebidae
- Subfamily: Arctiinae
- Genus: Cosmosoma
- Species: C. ethodaea

Binomial name
- Cosmosoma ethodaea H. Druce, 1889

Synonyms
- Gymnelia ethodaea H. Druce, 1889

Species of moth

Cosmosoma ethodaea is a moth of the family Erebidae. It was described by Herbert Druce in 1889. It is found in Mexico.
