= Cosmosoma seraphina =

Scientific classification
- Domain: Eukaryota
- Kingdom: Animalia
- Phylum: Arthropoda
- Class: Insecta
- Order: Lepidoptera
- Superfamily: Noctuoidea
- Family: Erebidae
- Subfamily: Arctiinae
- Genus: Cosmosoma
- Species: C. seraphina

Binomial name
- Cosmosoma seraphina (Herrich-Schäffer, 1854)

Synonyms
- Glaucopsis seraphina Herrich-Schäffer, [1854]

Species of moth

Cosmosoma seraphina is a moth of the subfamily Arctiinae. It was described by Gottlieb August Wilhelm Herrich-Schäffer in 1854. It is found in the Amazon region.
