= Cosmosoma pheres =

- Multiple species of moth including Cosmosoma pheres as a larva on the far left side (fig.5)

Scientific classification
- Kingdom: Animalia
- Phylum: Arthropoda
- Clade: Pancrustacea
- Class: Insecta
- Order: Lepidoptera
- Superfamily: Noctuoidea
- Family: Erebidae
- Subfamily: Arctiinae
- Genus: Cosmosoma
- Species: C. pheres

Binomial name
- Cosmosoma pheres (Stoll, [1782])

Synonyms
- Sphinx pheres Stoll, [1782]

Species of moth

Cosmosoma pheres is a moth of the subfamily Arctiinae. It was described by Caspar Stoll in 1782. It is found in Rio de Janeiro, Brazil.
