= Cosmosoma ladan =

Scientific classification
- Domain: Eukaryota
- Kingdom: Animalia
- Phylum: Arthropoda
- Class: Insecta
- Order: Lepidoptera
- Superfamily: Noctuoidea
- Family: Erebidae
- Subfamily: Arctiinae
- Genus: Cosmosoma
- Species: C. ladan

Binomial name
- Cosmosoma ladan (H. Druce, 1896)

Synonyms
- Dycladia ladan H. Druce, 1896; Pheia intensa H. Druce, 1884 (preocc. Walker, 1854); Saurita ladan (H. Druce, 1896)

Species of moth

Cosmosoma ladan is a moth of the subfamily Arctiinae. It was described by Herbert Druce in 1896. It is found in Panama.
