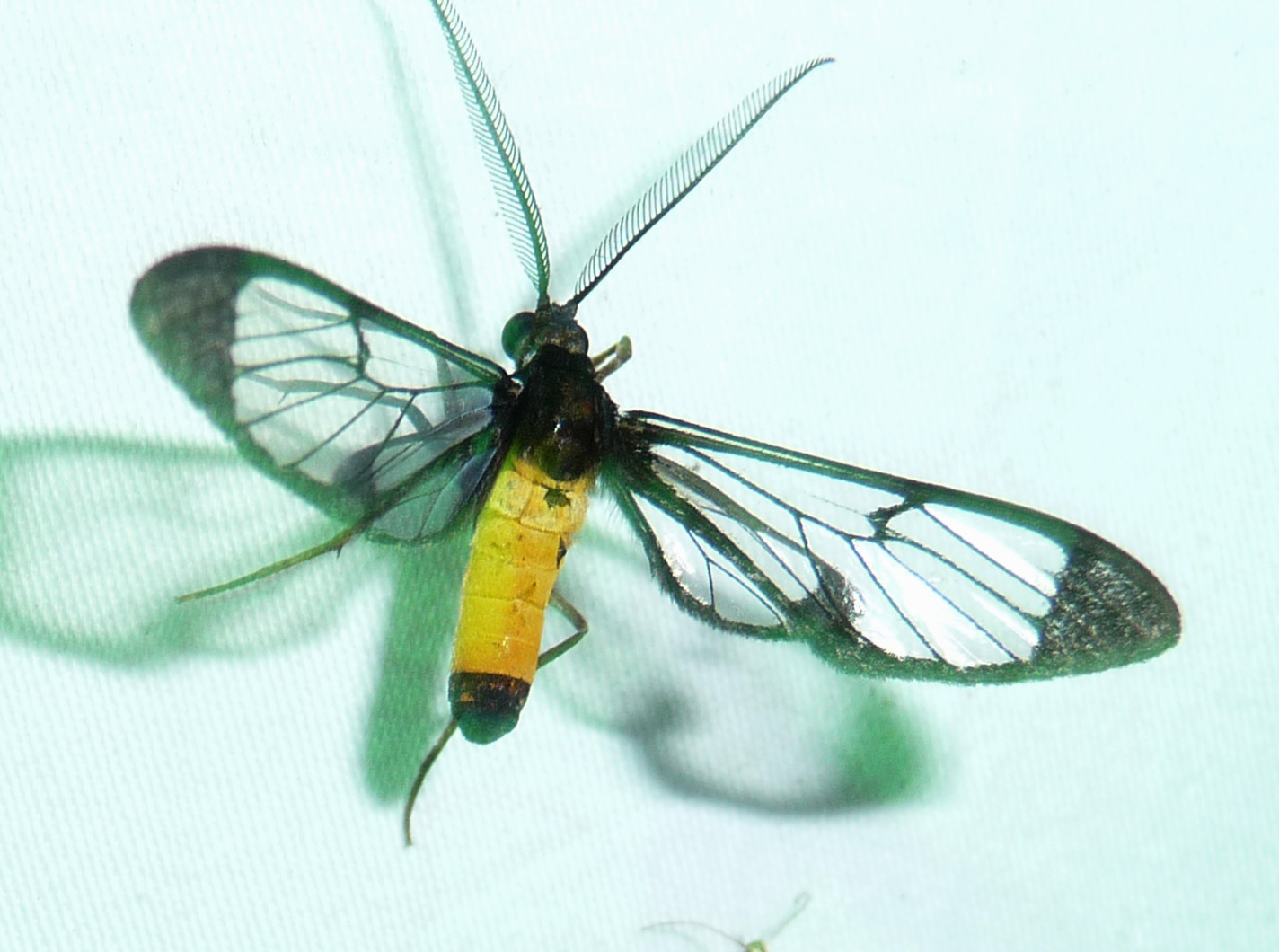

Scientific classification
- Domain: Eukaryota
- Kingdom: Animalia
- Phylum: Arthropoda
- Class: Insecta
- Order: Lepidoptera
- Superfamily: Noctuoidea
- Family: Erebidae
- Subfamily: Arctiinae
- Genus: Cosmosoma
- Species: C. orathidia

Binomial name
- Cosmosoma orathidia H. Druce, 1898

= Cosmosoma orathidia =

Species of moth

Cosmosoma orathidia is a moth of the subfamily Arctiinae. It was described by Herbert Druce in 1898. It is found in Nicaragua.
