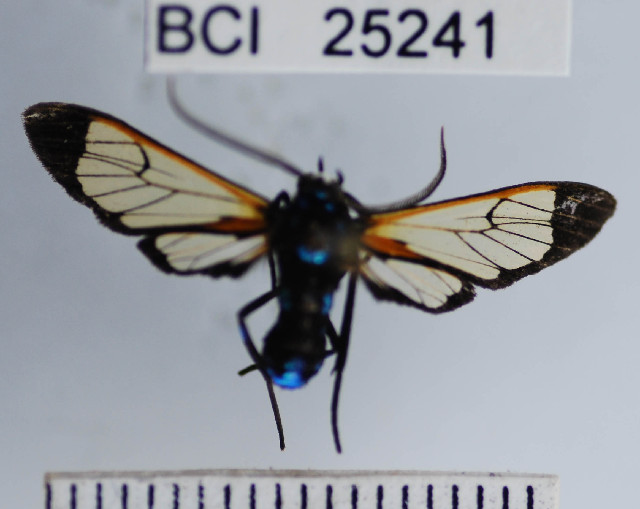

Scientific classification
- Domain: Eukaryota
- Kingdom: Animalia
- Phylum: Arthropoda
- Class: Insecta
- Order: Lepidoptera
- Superfamily: Noctuoidea
- Family: Erebidae
- Subfamily: Arctiinae
- Genus: Cosmosoma
- Species: C. saron

Binomial name
- Cosmosoma saron H. Druce, 1884

Synonyms
- Cosmosoma meres H. Druce, 1896

= Cosmosoma saron =

Species of moth

Cosmosoma saron is a moth of the subfamily Arctiinae. It was described by Herbert Druce in 1884. It is found in Panama.
