= Cosmosoma oratha =

Scientific classification
- Domain: Eukaryota
- Kingdom: Animalia
- Phylum: Arthropoda
- Class: Insecta
- Order: Lepidoptera
- Superfamily: Noctuoidea
- Family: Erebidae
- Subfamily: Arctiinae
- Genus: Cosmosoma
- Species: C. oratha

Binomial name
- Cosmosoma oratha (H. Druce, 1893)

Synonyms
- Autochloris oratha H. Druce, 1893

Species of moth

Cosmosoma oratha is a moth of the subfamily Arctiinae. It was described by Herbert Druce in 1893. It is found in Guyana.
