= Cosmosoma bogotensis =

Scientific classification
- Domain: Eukaryota
- Kingdom: Animalia
- Phylum: Arthropoda
- Class: Insecta
- Order: Lepidoptera
- Superfamily: Noctuoidea
- Family: Erebidae
- Subfamily: Arctiinae
- Genus: Cosmosoma
- Species: C. bogotensis

Binomial name
- Cosmosoma bogotensis (Felder, 1874)

Synonyms
- Euchromia bogotensis Felder, 1874

Species of moth

Cosmosoma bogotensis is a moth of the family Erebidae. It was described by Cajetan Felder in 1874. It is found in Colombia.
