= Cosmosoma quinquepuncta =

Scientific classification
- Domain: Eukaryota
- Kingdom: Animalia
- Phylum: Arthropoda
- Class: Insecta
- Order: Lepidoptera
- Superfamily: Noctuoidea
- Family: Erebidae
- Subfamily: Arctiinae
- Genus: Cosmosoma
- Species: C. quinquepuncta

Binomial name
- Cosmosoma quinquepuncta (Heylaerts, 1890)

Synonyms
- Laemocharis quinquepuncta Heylaerts, 1890

Species of moth

Cosmosoma quinquepuncta is a moth of the subfamily Arctiinae. It was described by Franciscus J. M. Heylaerts in 1890. It is found in São Paulo, Brazil.
