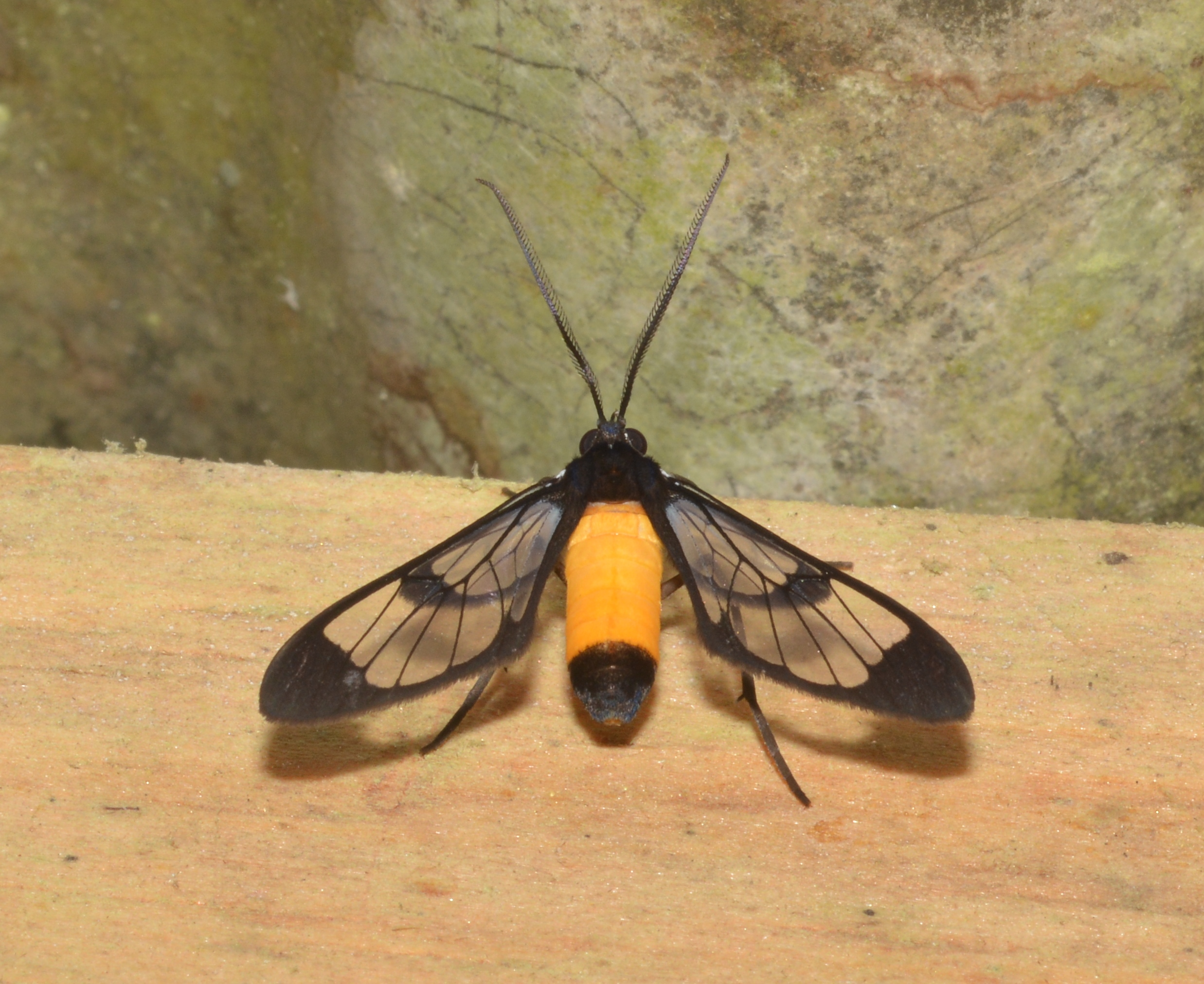
- Cosmosoma stilbosticta in Costa Rica

Scientific classification
- Domain: Eukaryota
- Kingdom: Animalia
- Phylum: Arthropoda
- Class: Insecta
- Order: Lepidoptera
- Superfamily: Noctuoidea
- Family: Erebidae
- Subfamily: Arctiinae
- Genus: Cosmosoma
- Species: C. stilbosticta

Binomial name
- Cosmosoma stilbosticta (Butler, 1876)

Synonyms
- Ilipa stibosticta Butler, 1876; Chrostosoma stilbosticta Hernández-Baz, 2013

= Cosmosoma stilbosticta =

Species of moth

Cosmosoma stilbosticta is a moth of the subfamily Arctiinae. It was described by Arthur Gardiner Butler in 1876. It is found in Panama, Costa Rica, Colombia and Peru.

== Description ==
The species Cosmosoma stilbosticta was described by Arthur Gardiner Butler first known from two specimens collected in "Pacho, New Granada (Janson)" (I.e. Colombia). Notable features given in the original description was the black head with two white dots - the black antennae originating from a white spot. Else, the black thorax with a large central white spot, and golden yellow abdomen with the three terminal segments black.
