= Cosmosoma stryma =

Scientific classification
- Kingdom: Animalia
- Phylum: Arthropoda
- Class: Insecta
- Order: Lepidoptera
- Superfamily: Noctuoidea
- Family: Erebidae
- Subfamily: Arctiinae
- Genus: Cosmosoma
- Species: C. stryma

Binomial name
- Cosmosoma stryma (H. Druce, 1884)

Synonyms
- Laemocharis stryma H. Druce, 1884; Saurita stryma (H. Druce, 1884)

Species of moth

Cosmosoma stryma is a moth of the subfamily Arctiinae. It was described by Herbert Druce in 1884. It is found in Mexico and Nicaragua.
