= Cosmosoma admota =

Scientific classification
- Domain: Eukaryota
- Kingdom: Animalia
- Phylum: Arthropoda
- Class: Insecta
- Order: Lepidoptera
- Superfamily: Noctuoidea
- Family: Erebidae
- Subfamily: Arctiinae
- Genus: Cosmosoma
- Species: C. admota

Binomial name
- Cosmosoma admota (Herrich-Schäffer, [1854])

Synonyms
- Laemocharis admota Herrich-Schäffer, [1854]; Laemocharis confinis Herrich-Schäffer, [1854]; Cosmosoma confine

Species of moth

Cosmosoma admota is a moth of the family Erebidae. It was described by Gottlieb August Wilhelm Herrich-Schäffer in 1854. It is found in the Brazilian states of Pernambuco, Bahia, and Espírito Santo.
