= Cosmosoma tarapotensis =

Scientific classification
- Domain: Eukaryota
- Kingdom: Animalia
- Phylum: Arthropoda
- Class: Insecta
- Order: Lepidoptera
- Superfamily: Noctuoidea
- Family: Erebidae
- Subfamily: Arctiinae
- Genus: Cosmosoma
- Species: C. tarapotensis

Binomial name
- Cosmosoma tarapotensis (H. Druce, 1897)

Synonyms
- Homoeocera tarapotensis H. Druce, 1897; Gymnelia tarapotensis H. Druce, 1897

Species of moth

Cosmosoma tarapotensis is a moth of the subfamily Arctiinae. It was described by Herbert Druce in 1897. It is found in Peru and Brazil.
