= Cosmosoma protus =

Scientific classification
- Domain: Eukaryota
- Kingdom: Animalia
- Phylum: Arthropoda
- Class: Insecta
- Order: Lepidoptera
- Superfamily: Noctuoidea
- Family: Erebidae
- Subfamily: Arctiinae
- Genus: Cosmosoma
- Species: C. protus

Binomial name
- Cosmosoma protus H. Druce, 1894

Synonyms
- Cosmosoma protus Hampson, 1898

Species of moth

Cosmosoma protus is a moth of the subfamily Arctiinae. It was described by Herbert Druce in 1894. It is found in Mexico.
