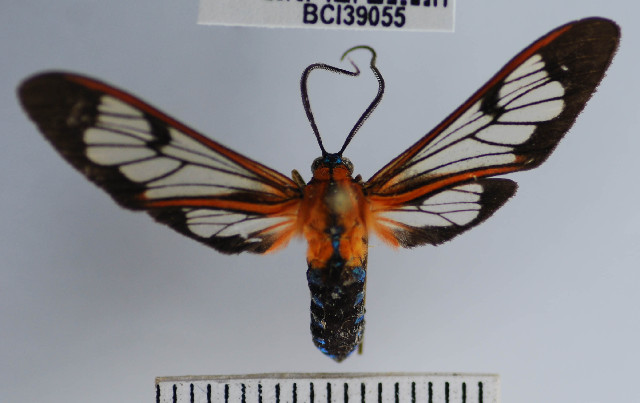

Scientific classification
- Kingdom: Animalia
- Phylum: Arthropoda
- Class: Insecta
- Order: Lepidoptera
- Superfamily: Noctuoidea
- Family: Erebidae
- Subfamily: Arctiinae
- Genus: Cosmosoma
- Species: C. caecum

Binomial name
- Cosmosoma caecum Hampson, 1898

= Cosmosoma caecum =

Species of moth

Cosmosoma caecum is a moth of the family Erebidae described by George Hampson in 1898. It is found in Mexico, Costa Rica, Guatemala and Panama.
