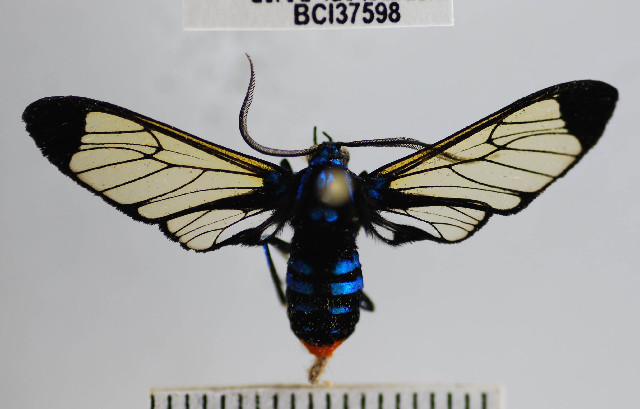

Scientific classification
- Domain: Eukaryota
- Kingdom: Animalia
- Phylum: Arthropoda
- Class: Insecta
- Order: Lepidoptera
- Superfamily: Noctuoidea
- Family: Erebidae
- Subfamily: Arctiinae
- Genus: Cosmosoma
- Species: C. salvini

Binomial name
- Cosmosoma salvini (Butler, 1876)

Synonyms
- Homoeocera salvini Butler, 1876; Gymnelia salvini

= Cosmosoma salvini =

Species of moth

Cosmosoma salvini is a moth of the subfamily Arctiinae. It was described by Arthur Gardiner Butler in 1876. It is found in Panama and Costa Rica.
