= Cosmosoma vesparia =

Scientific classification
- Domain: Eukaryota
- Kingdom: Animalia
- Phylum: Arthropoda
- Class: Insecta
- Order: Lepidoptera
- Superfamily: Noctuoidea
- Family: Erebidae
- Subfamily: Arctiinae
- Genus: Cosmosoma
- Species: C. vesparia

Binomial name
- Cosmosoma vesparia (Perty, 1834)

Synonyms
- Glaucopis vesparia Perty, 1834; Isanthrene odyneroides Walker, 1856; Cosmosoma vesparium Hampson, 1898

Species of moth

Cosmosoma vesparia is a moth of the subfamily Arctiinae. It was described by Maximilian Perty in 1834. It is found in the Amazon region.
