= Cosmosoma flavicornis =

Scientific classification
- Domain: Eukaryota
- Kingdom: Animalia
- Phylum: Arthropoda
- Class: Insecta
- Order: Lepidoptera
- Superfamily: Noctuoidea
- Family: Erebidae
- Subfamily: Arctiinae
- Genus: Cosmosoma
- Species: C. flavicornis

Binomial name
- Cosmosoma flavicornis (H. Druce, 1883)

Synonyms
- Calonotos flavicornis H. Druce, 1883; Gymnelia flavicornis

Species of moth

Cosmosoma flavicornis is a moth in the family Erebidae. Described by Herbert Druce in 1883, it is endemic to Ecuador.
