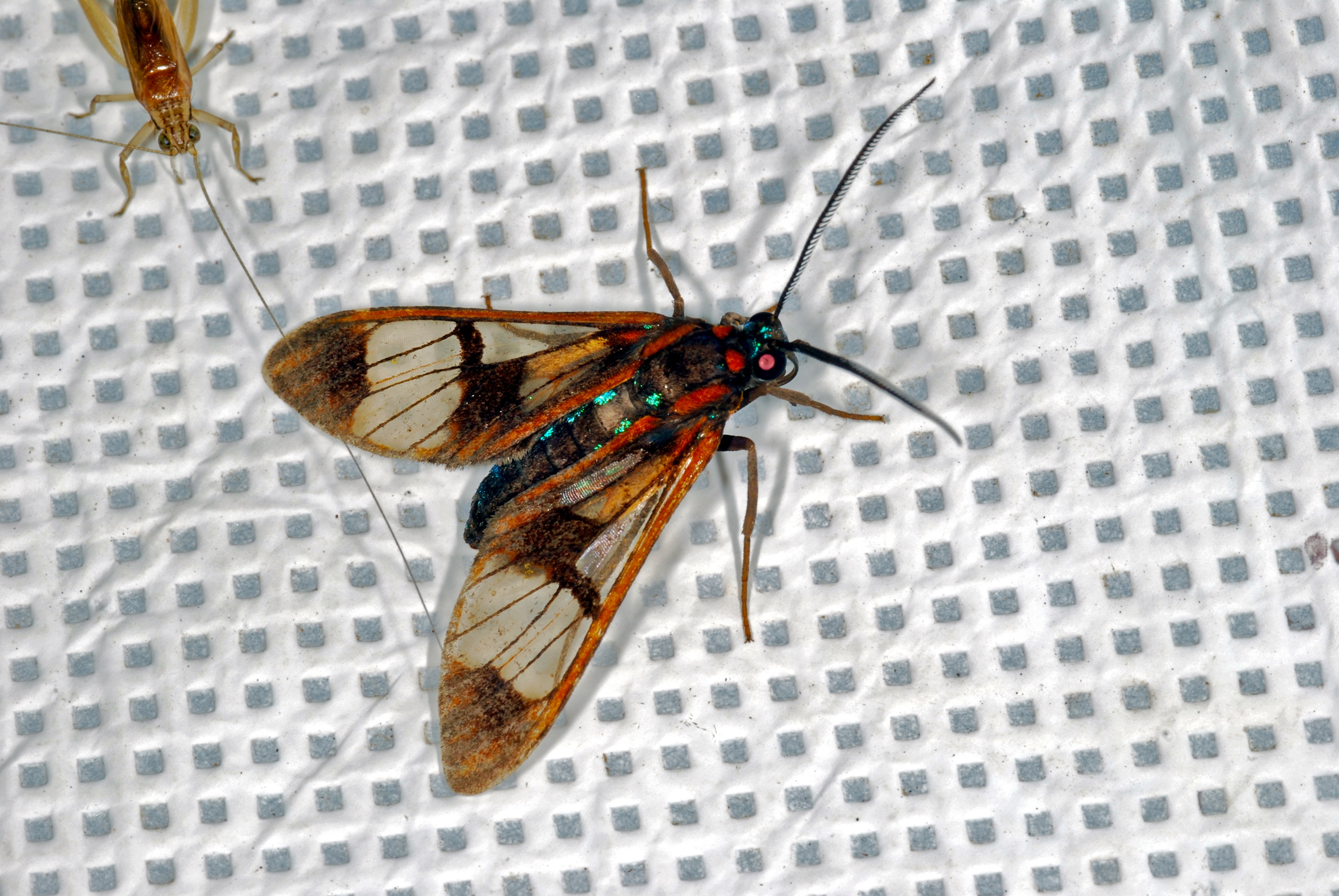

Scientific classification
- Kingdom: Animalia
- Phylum: Arthropoda
- Class: Insecta
- Order: Lepidoptera
- Superfamily: Noctuoidea
- Family: Erebidae
- Subfamily: Arctiinae
- Genus: Cosmosoma
- Species: C. festivum

Binomial name
- Cosmosoma festivum (Walker, 1854)

Synonyms
- Cosmosoma aleus Schaus, 1889; Cosmosoma festiva

= Cosmosoma festivum =

Festivum wasp moth

Species of moth

Cosmosoma festivum, the festivum wasp moth, is a moth of the family Erebidae. It was described by Francis Walker in 1854. It is found in Mexico, Guatemala, Belize, Costa Rica and Honduras. It has also been recorded in southern Florida and southern Texas.

Adults exhibit considerable sexual dimorphism.
