= Cosmosoma juanita =

Scientific classification
- Kingdom: Animalia
- Phylum: Arthropoda
- Class: Insecta
- Order: Lepidoptera
- Superfamily: Noctuoidea
- Family: Erebidae
- Subfamily: Arctiinae
- Genus: Cosmosoma
- Species: C. juanita

Binomial name
- Cosmosoma juanita Neumoegen, 1894

Species of moth

Cosmosoma juanita is a moth of the subfamily Arctiinae. It was described by Berthold Neumoegen in 1894. It is found on Cuba.
