= Calonotos triplaga =

Scientific classification
- Kingdom: Animalia
- Phylum: Arthropoda
- Class: Insecta
- Order: Lepidoptera
- Superfamily: Noctuoidea
- Family: Erebidae
- Subfamily: Arctiinae
- Genus: Calonotos
- Species: C. triplaga

Binomial name
- Calonotos triplaga Hampson, 1909

Synonyms
- Calonotos tripunctatus Hampson, 1898

Species of moth

Calonotos triplaga is a moth of the subfamily Arctiinae. It was described by George Hampson in 1909. It is found in the Amazon region.
