= Calonotos rectifascia =

Scientific classification
- Domain: Eukaryota
- Kingdom: Animalia
- Phylum: Arthropoda
- Class: Insecta
- Order: Lepidoptera
- Superfamily: Noctuoidea
- Family: Erebidae
- Subfamily: Arctiinae
- Genus: Calonotos
- Species: C. rectifascia

Binomial name
- Calonotos rectifascia Talbot, 1932

Species of moth

Calonotos rectifascia is a moth of the subfamily Arctiinae. It was described by George Talbot in 1932. It is found in Colombia.
