= Calonotos dorata =

Scientific classification
- Domain: Eukaryota
- Kingdom: Animalia
- Phylum: Arthropoda
- Class: Insecta
- Order: Lepidoptera
- Superfamily: Noctuoidea
- Family: Erebidae
- Subfamily: Arctiinae
- Genus: Calonotos
- Species: C. dorata

Binomial name
- Calonotos dorata (Dognin, 1897)

Synonyms
- Calonotos chryseis Druce, 1898

Species of moth

Calonotos dorata is a moth of the subfamily Arctiinae. It was described by Paul Dognin in 1897. It is found in Ecuador, Colombia and Bolivia.
