= Cosmosoma eumelis =

Scientific classification
- Domain: Eukaryota
- Kingdom: Animalia
- Phylum: Arthropoda
- Class: Insecta
- Order: Lepidoptera
- Superfamily: Noctuoidea
- Family: Erebidae
- Subfamily: Arctiinae
- Genus: Cosmosoma
- Species: C. eumelis

Binomial name
- Cosmosoma eumelis (H. Druce, 1883)

Synonyms
- Loxophlebia eumelis H. Druce, 1883

Species of moth

Cosmosoma eumelis is a moth of the family Erebidae. It was described by Herbert Druce in 1883. It is found in Ecuador, Bolivia and Brazil.
