= Calonotos plumulatus =

Scientific classification
- Domain: Eukaryota
- Kingdom: Animalia
- Phylum: Arthropoda
- Class: Insecta
- Order: Lepidoptera
- Superfamily: Noctuoidea
- Family: Erebidae
- Subfamily: Arctiinae
- Genus: Calonotos
- Species: C. plumulatus

Binomial name
- Calonotos plumulatus (Klages, 1906)

Synonyms
- Sphinx plumulata Klages, 1906; Calonotos plumulata (Klages, 1906)

Species of moth

Calonotos plumulatus is a moth of the subfamily Arctiinae. It was described by Edward A. Klages in 1906. It is found in Venezuela.
