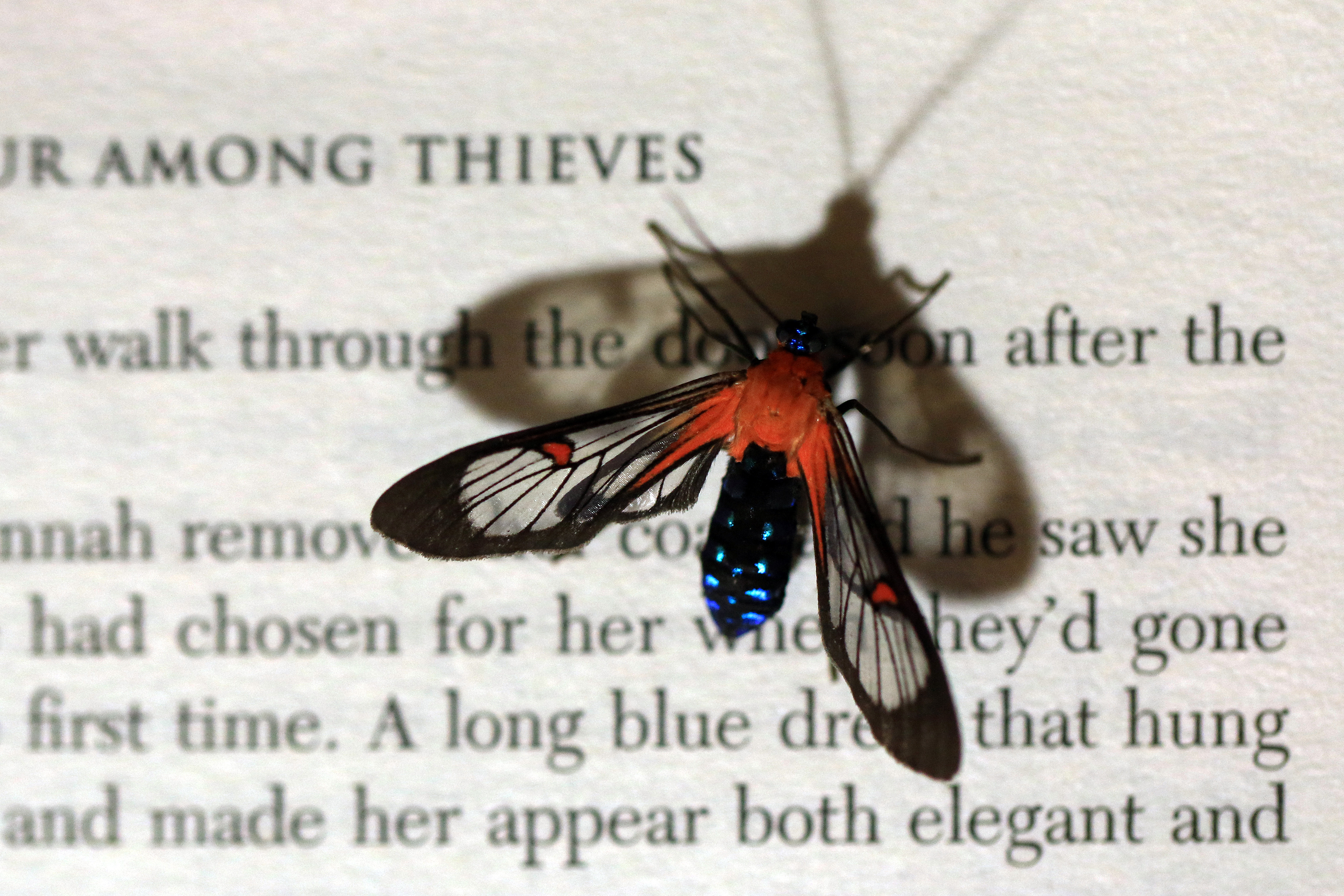

Scientific classification
- Kingdom: Animalia
- Phylum: Arthropoda
- Class: Insecta
- Order: Lepidoptera
- Superfamily: Noctuoidea
- Family: Erebidae
- Subfamily: Arctiinae
- Genus: Cosmosoma
- Species: C. teuthras

Binomial name
- Cosmosoma teuthras (Walker, 1854)

Synonyms
- Glaucopis teuthras Walker, 1854; Cosmosoma cingulatum Butler, 1876; Cosmosoma rubrigutta Skinner, 1906

= Cosmosoma teuthras =

Species of moth

Cosmosoma teuthras is a species of moth in the subfamily Arctiinae. It is found in Mexico, Guatemala, Costa Rica, Panama, Colombia, Venezuela and Brazil.

== Subspecies ==
- Cosmosoma teuthras teuthras
- Cosmosoma teuthras cingulatum Butler, 1876 (Mexico, Guatemala, Costa Rica, Panama)
- Cosmosoma teuthras restrictum Butler, 1876 (Brazil: Santarem)
