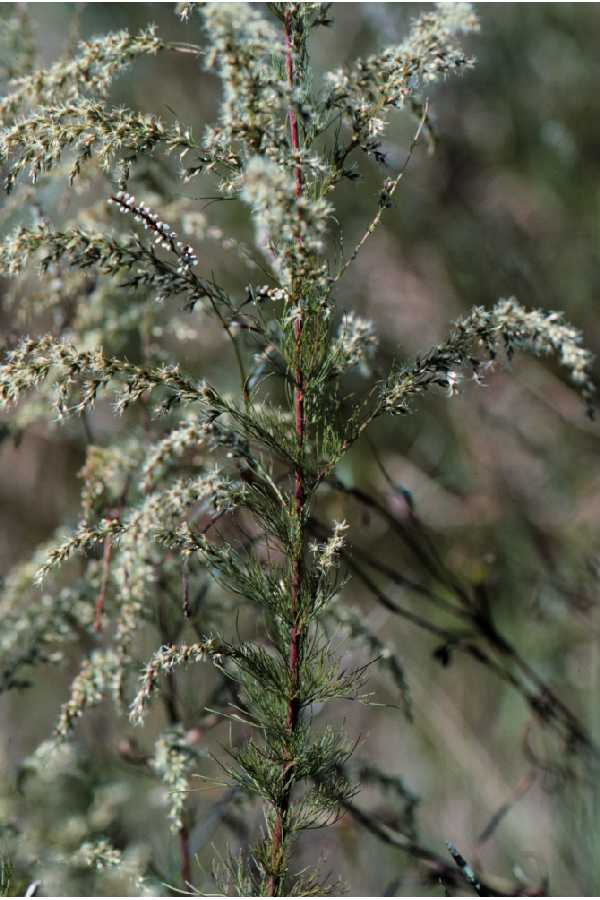

Conservation status
- Secure (NatureServe)

Scientific classification
- Kingdom: Plantae
- Clade: Tracheophytes
- Clade: Angiosperms
- Clade: Eudicots
- Clade: Asterids
- Order: Asterales
- Family: Asteraceae
- Genus: Eupatorium
- Species: E. capillifolium

Binomial name
- Eupatorium capillifolium (Lam.) Small

Synonyms
- Synonymy: Artemisia capillifolia Lam.; Artemisia tenuifolia Willd.; Chrysocoma capillacea Michx.; Eupatorium foeniculaceum Willd.; Eupatorium foeniculoides Walter; Mikania artemisioides Cass.; Traganthes tenuifolia Wallr.

= Eupatorium capillifolium =

Species of flowering plant

Eupatorium capillifolium, or dog fennel (also written "dogfennel"), is a North American perennial herbaceous plant in the family Asteraceae, native to the eastern and south-central United States. It is generally between 50 cm and 2 meters tall with several stems that fork from a substantial base. The stems and base are covered in leaves so dissected that they resemble branching green threads coming out of the stem in fractal patterns. When crushed, the leaves have a sour odor similar to dill pickles. The flowers have a subtle floral odor.

== Classification ==
Dogfennel is closely related to Eupatorium compositifolium (yankeeweed) and Eupatorium leptophyllum and some authors consider all of them varieties of E. capillifolium. Others maintain them as three species but consider them a related group, known as dogfennels or the Traganthes group. They all are characterized by dissected leaves.

== Cultivation and uses ==
Dog fennel thrives on roadsides, in fields and reduced tillage crops, as well as areas that have burned or otherwise been disturbed. It is found in the early to middle (seral) stages of ecological succession. It is native to the southern and eastern United States, from Massachusetts south to Florida, and west to Missouri and Texas, and also Cuba and the Bahamas. Unlike insect-pollinated plants in this genus, E. capillifolium is wind-pollinated.

Dog fennel is eaten by Florida's scarlet-bodied wasp moth, Cosmosoma myrodora. These moths feed on the plant while mature, to store its toxins and ward off predators.

== Control ==
Dog fennel spreads by both seeds and rootstocks and can grow quite aggressively. It is common in pastures, especially those that are unimproved or overgrazed, and degrades the quality of the pasture by competing with desired forage species. Dog fennel contains liver-damaging pyrrolizidine alkaloids, so livestock are known to eat all the turf around a stand of it. To remove infestations of dog fennel, the recommended course of action is to mow it before it can seed.

It has also been introduced outside its native range, for example in Nepal.

== Toxicity ==
Dog fennel contains pyrrolizidine alkaloids which can cause liver failure.

== Medicinal uses ==
Eupatorium capillifolium is extracted into an essential oil and has anti-fungal properties.

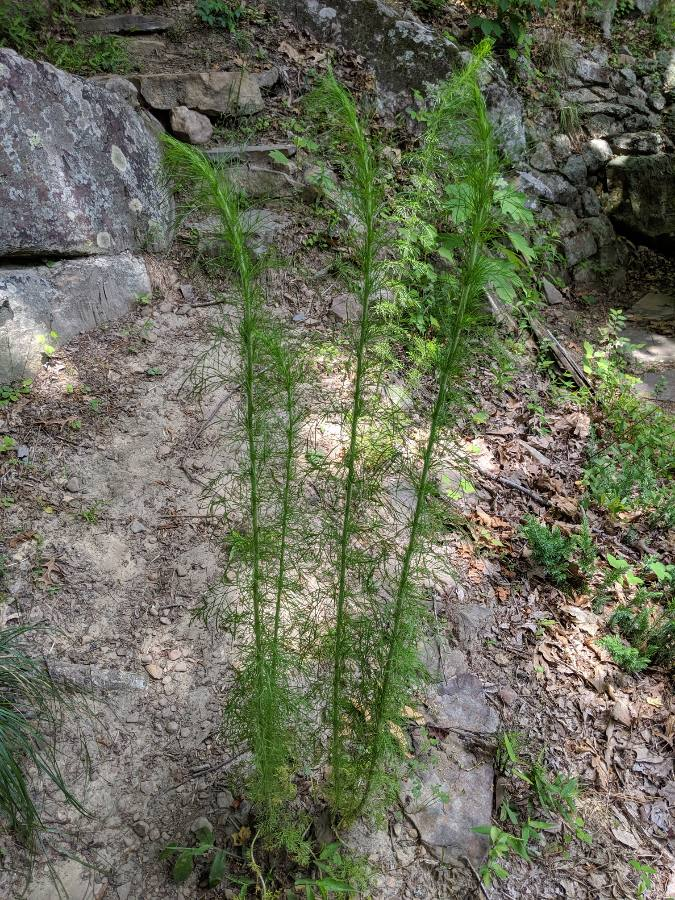

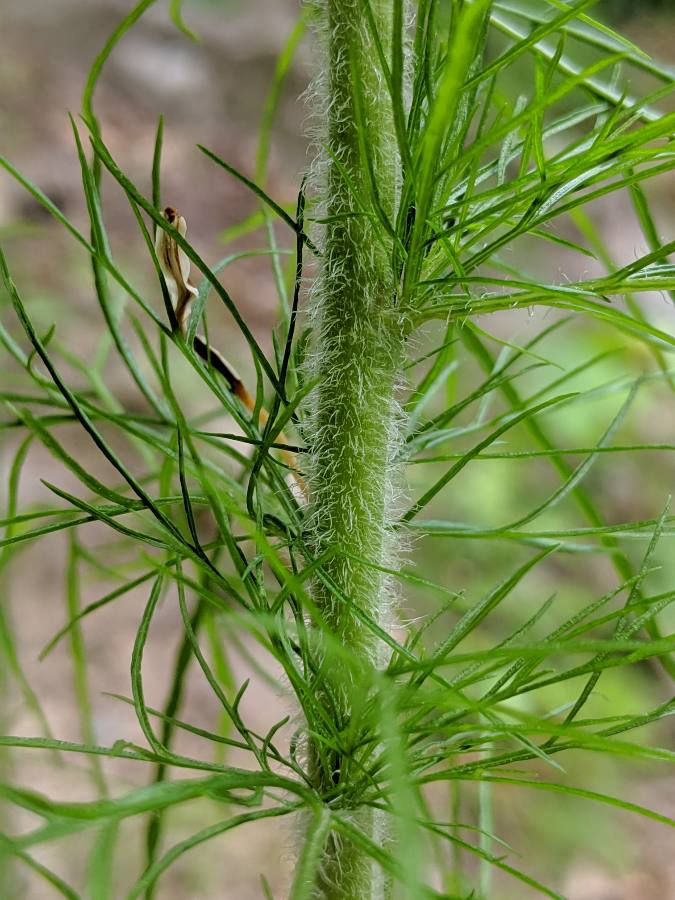
