= Calonotos opalizans =

Scientific classification
- Domain: Eukaryota
- Kingdom: Animalia
- Phylum: Arthropoda
- Class: Insecta
- Order: Lepidoptera
- Superfamily: Noctuoidea
- Family: Erebidae
- Subfamily: Arctiinae
- Genus: Calonotos
- Species: C. opalizans

Binomial name
- Calonotos opalizans Rothschild, 1911

Species of moth

Calonotos opalizans is a moth of the subfamily Arctiinae. It was described by Rothschild in 1911. It is found in Venezuela.
