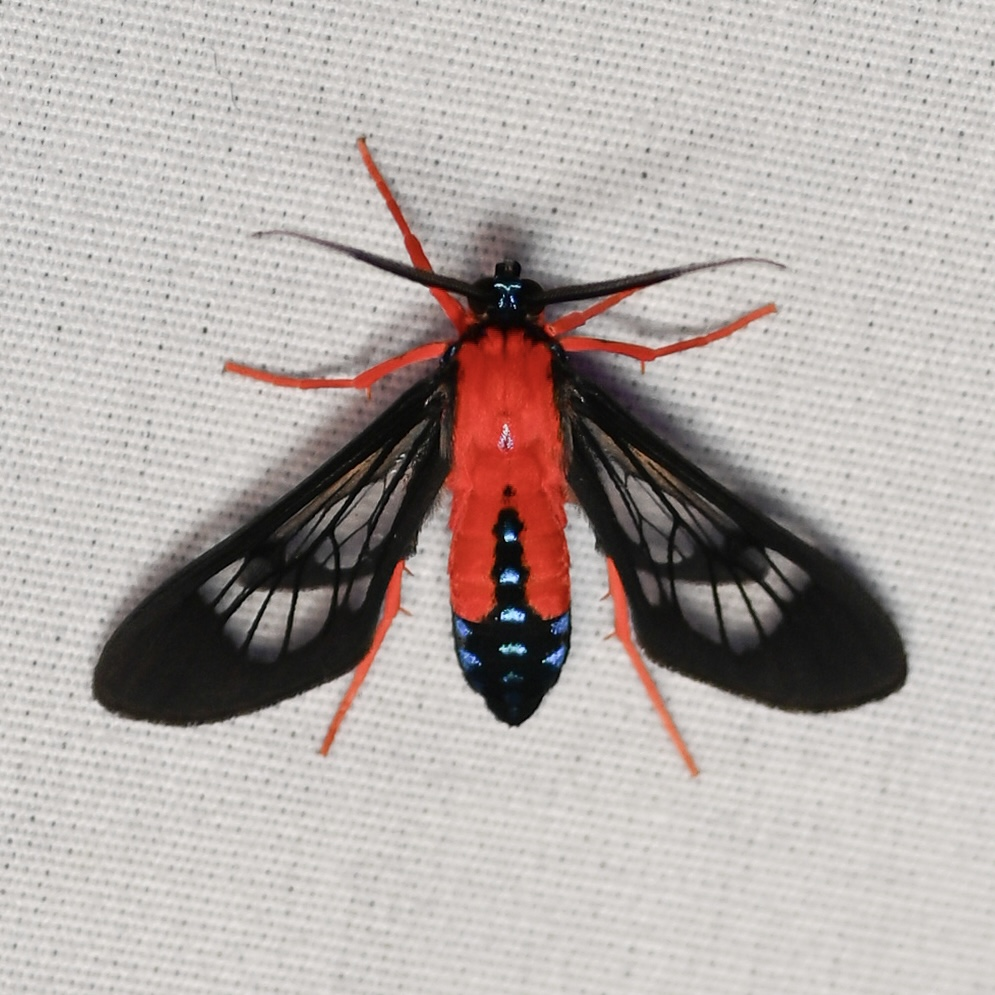
- Specimen in Louisiana

Scientific classification
- Kingdom: Animalia
- Phylum: Arthropoda
- Clade: Pancrustacea
- Class: Insecta
- Order: Lepidoptera
- Superfamily: Noctuoidea
- Family: Erebidae
- Subfamily: Arctiinae
- Genus: Cosmosoma
- Species: C. myrodora

Binomial name
- Cosmosoma myrodora Dyar, 1907

= Cosmosoma myrodora =

Species of moth

Cosmosoma myrodora, the scarlet-bodied wasp moth, is a moth of the subfamily Arctiinae. It was described by Harrison Gray Dyar Jr. in 1907. It is found in the United States in Florida and from South Carolina to Texas. It was found also in Brazil, in the outskirts of São Paulo. The habitat consists of coastal plains.

The wingspan is 30–35 mm. Adults are on wing from March to December. An adult male extracts toxic chemicals from Eupatorium capillifolium and showers these toxins over the female prior to mating.

The larvae feed on Mikania scandens.
