= Calonotos aequimaculatus =

Scientific classification
- Domain: Eukaryota
- Kingdom: Animalia
- Phylum: Arthropoda
- Class: Insecta
- Order: Lepidoptera
- Superfamily: Noctuoidea
- Family: Erebidae
- Subfamily: Arctiinae
- Genus: Calonotos
- Species: C. aequimaculatus

Binomial name
- Calonotos aequimaculatus Zerny, 1931

Species of moth

Calonotos aequimaculatus is a moth of the subfamily Arctiinae. It was described by Zerny in 1931. It is found in Brazil.
