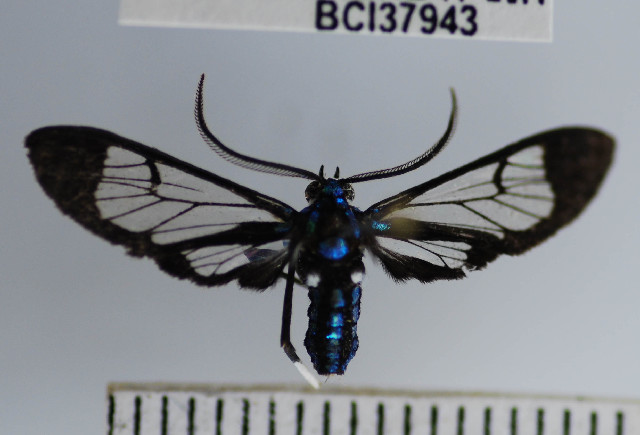

Scientific classification
- Domain: Eukaryota
- Kingdom: Animalia
- Phylum: Arthropoda
- Class: Insecta
- Order: Lepidoptera
- Superfamily: Noctuoidea
- Family: Erebidae
- Subfamily: Arctiinae
- Genus: Cosmosoma
- Species: C. metallescens

Binomial name
- Cosmosoma metallescens (Ménétriés, 1857)

Synonyms
- Laemocharis metallescens Ménétriés, 1857; Laemocharis chalcosticta Butler, 1876

= Cosmosoma metallescens =

Species of moth

Cosmosoma metallescens is a moth of the subfamily Arctiinae. It was described by Édouard Ménétries in 1857. It is found from Mexico to the Amazon region.
