= Cosmosoma beata =

Scientific classification
- Domain: Eukaryota
- Kingdom: Animalia
- Phylum: Arthropoda
- Class: Insecta
- Order: Lepidoptera
- Superfamily: Noctuoidea
- Family: Erebidae
- Subfamily: Arctiinae
- Genus: Cosmosoma
- Species: C. beata

Binomial name
- Cosmosoma beata (Butler, 1876)

Synonyms
- Homoeocera beata Butler, 1876; Gymnelia beata Butler, 1876

Species of moth

Cosmosoma beata is a moth of the family Erebidae. It was described by Arthur Gardiner Butler in 1876. It is found in Panama, Colombia and Brazil.
