= Cosmosoma remota =

Scientific classification
- Kingdom: Animalia
- Phylum: Arthropoda
- Class: Insecta
- Order: Lepidoptera
- Superfamily: Noctuoidea
- Family: Erebidae
- Subfamily: Arctiinae
- Genus: Cosmosoma
- Species: C. remota

Binomial name
- Cosmosoma remota (Walker, 1854)

Synonyms
- Glaucopis remota Walker, 1854

Species of moth

Cosmosoma remota is a moth of the subfamily Arctiinae. It was described by Francis Walker in 1854. It can be found in Venezuela.
