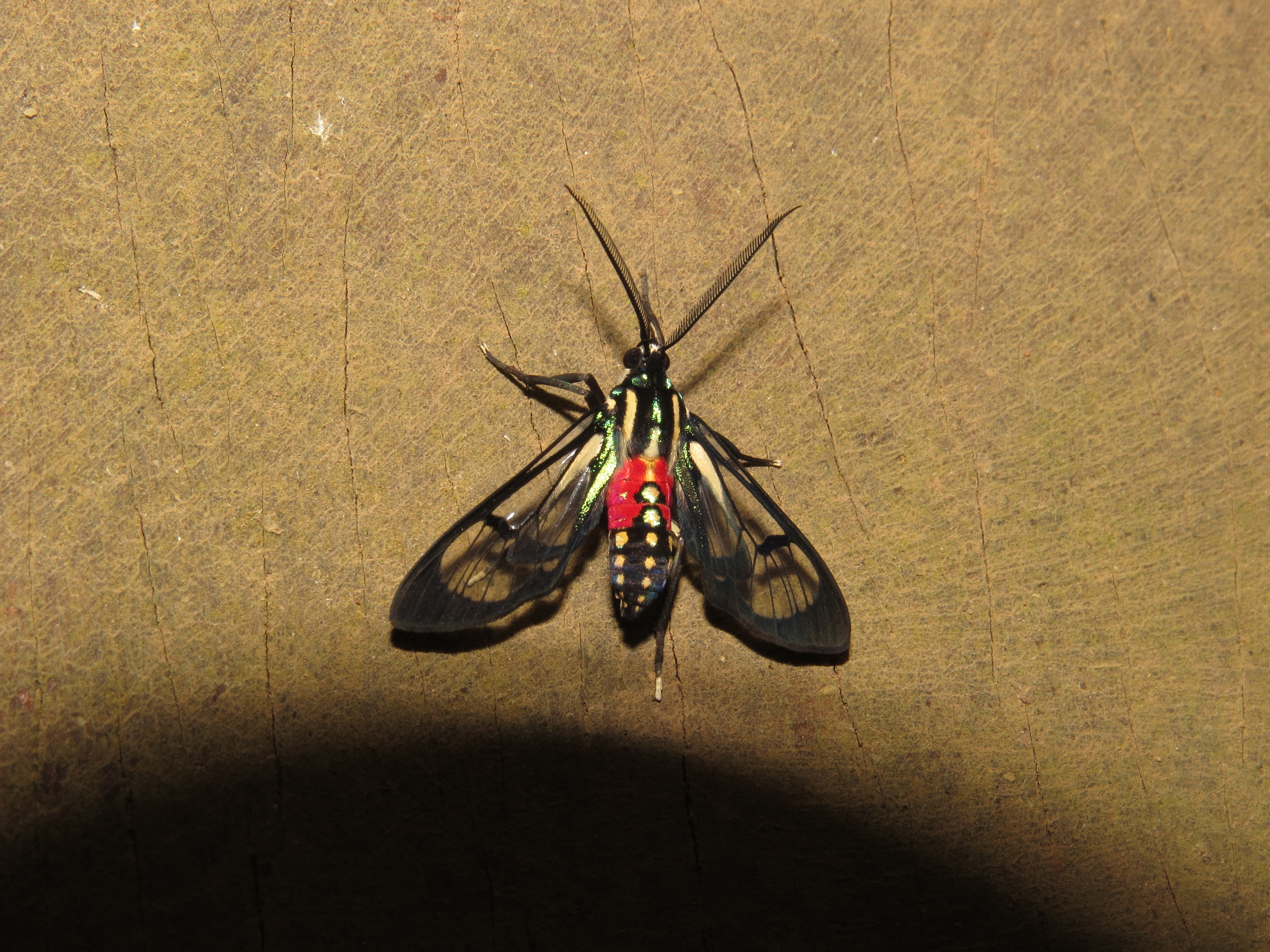
- Adult

Scientific classification
- Kingdom: Animalia
- Phylum: Arthropoda
- Class: Insecta
- Order: Lepidoptera
- Superfamily: Noctuoidea
- Family: Erebidae
- Subfamily: Arctiinae
- Genus: Cosmosoma
- Species: C. regia

Binomial name
- Cosmosoma regia (Schaus, 1894)

Synonyms
- Marissa regia Schaus, 1894; Eunomia nicippe Druce, 1897

= Cosmosoma regia =

Species of moth

Cosmosoma regia is a moth of the subfamily Arctiinae. It was described by William Schaus in 1894. It is found in Venezuela and Peru.
