= Calonotos longipennis =

Scientific classification
- Domain: Eukaryota
- Kingdom: Animalia
- Phylum: Arthropoda
- Class: Insecta
- Order: Lepidoptera
- Superfamily: Noctuoidea
- Family: Erebidae
- Subfamily: Arctiinae
- Genus: Calonotos
- Species: C. longipennis

Binomial name
- Calonotos longipennis Rothschild, 1911

Species of moth

Calonotos longipennis is a moth of the subfamily Arctiinae. It was described by Rothschild in 1911. It is found in Suriname.
