= Cosmosoma demantria =

Scientific classification
- Domain: Eukaryota
- Kingdom: Animalia
- Phylum: Arthropoda
- Class: Insecta
- Order: Lepidoptera
- Superfamily: Noctuoidea
- Family: Erebidae
- Subfamily: Arctiinae
- Genus: Cosmosoma
- Species: C. demantria

Binomial name
- Cosmosoma demantria H. Druce, 1895

Species of moth

Cosmosoma demantria is a moth of the family Erebidae. It was described by Herbert Druce in 1895. It is found on Dominica.
