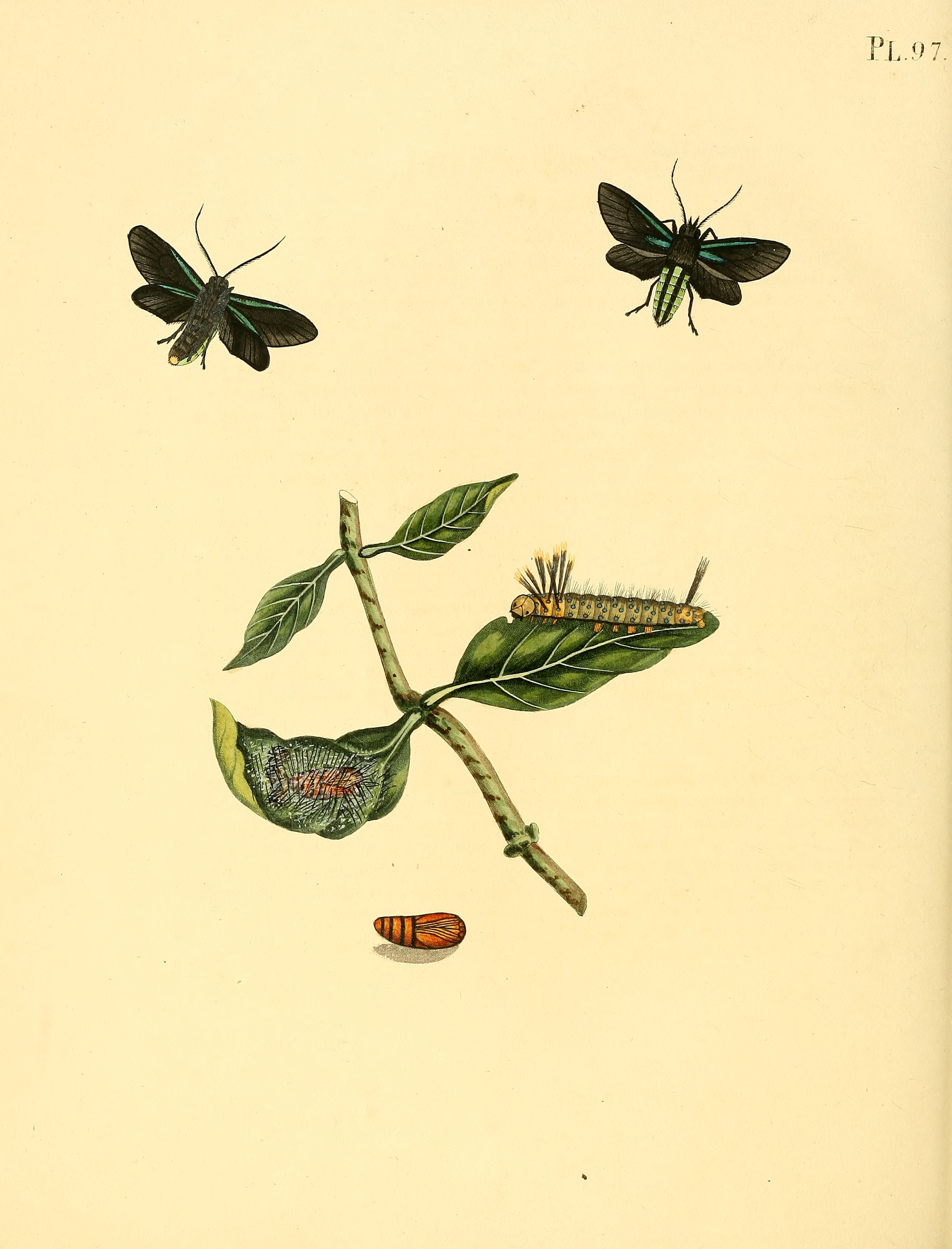

Scientific classification
- Domain: Eukaryota
- Kingdom: Animalia
- Phylum: Arthropoda
- Class: Insecta
- Order: Lepidoptera
- Superfamily: Noctuoidea
- Family: Erebidae
- Subfamily: Arctiinae
- Genus: Calonotos
- Species: C. helymus

Binomial name
- Calonotos helymus (Cramer, 1775)

Synonyms
- Sphinx helymus Cramer, [1775]; Glaucopis aterrima Sepp, 1848; Calonotos aterrima

= Calonotos helymus =

Species of moth

Calonotos helymus is a moth of the subfamily Arctiinae. It was described by Pieter Cramer in 1775. It is found in Suriname and French Guiana.
