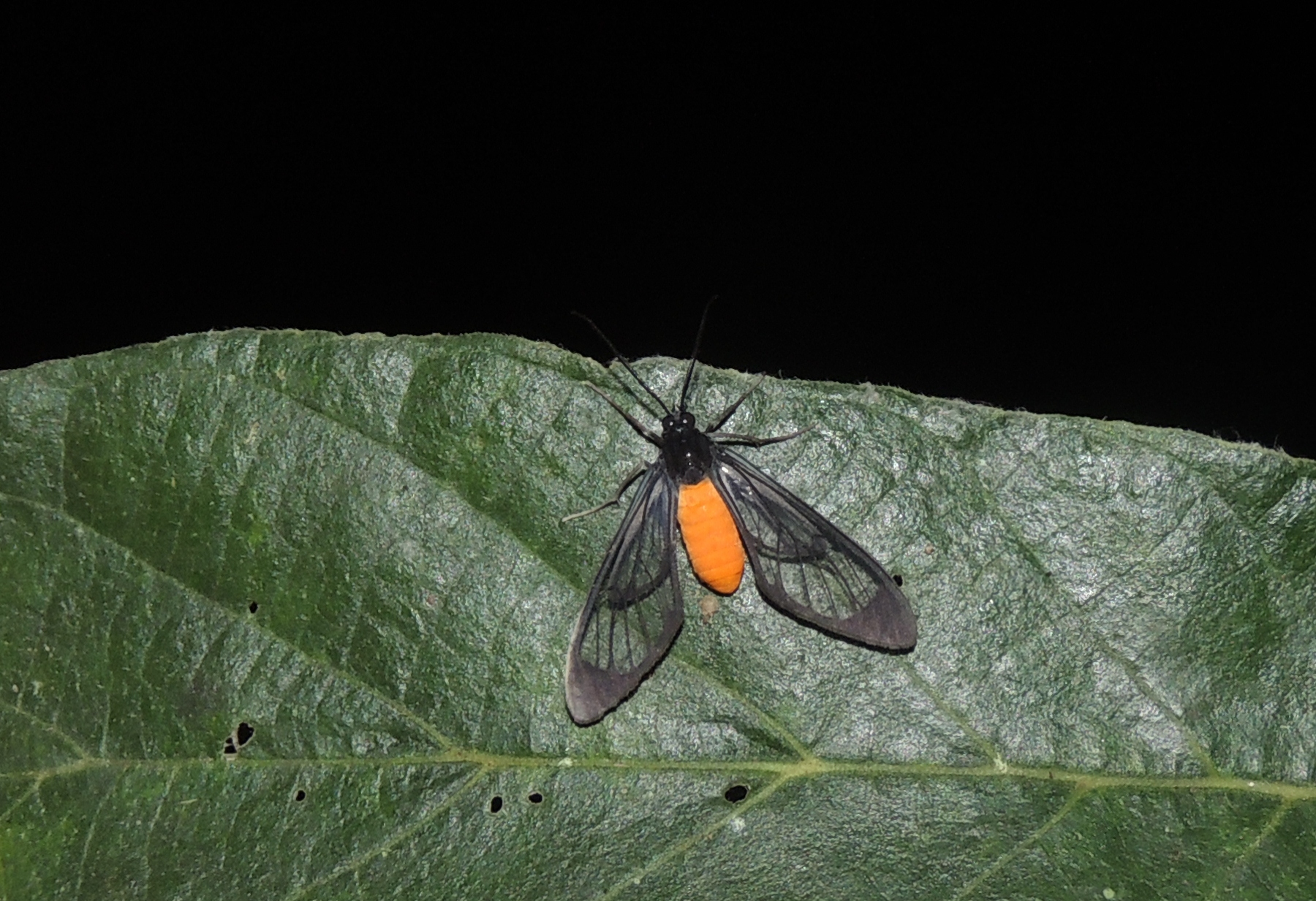
- In Pedro de Toledo, São Paulo, Brazil

Scientific classification
- Kingdom: Animalia
- Phylum: Arthropoda
- Class: Insecta
- Order: Lepidoptera
- Superfamily: Noctuoidea
- Family: Erebidae
- Subfamily: Arctiinae
- Genus: Cosmosoma
- Species: C. tengyra

Binomial name
- Cosmosoma tengyra (Walker, 1854)

Synonyms
- Glaucopis tengyra Walker, 1854; Laemocharis fulviventris Ménétriés, 1857

= Cosmosoma tengyra =

Species of moth

Cosmosoma tengyra is a moth of the subfamily Arctiinae found in the Amazon region. It was described by Francis Walker in 1854.
