= Calonotos phlegmon =

Scientific classification
- Domain: Eukaryota
- Kingdom: Animalia
- Phylum: Arthropoda
- Class: Insecta
- Order: Lepidoptera
- Superfamily: Noctuoidea
- Family: Erebidae
- Subfamily: Arctiinae
- Genus: Calonotos
- Species: C. phlegmon

Binomial name
- Calonotos phlegmon (Cramer, 1775)

Synonyms
- Sphinx phlegmon Cramer, [1775]

Species of moth

Calonotos phlegmon is a moth of the subfamily Arctiinae. It was described by Pieter Cramer in 1775. It is found in Brazil and French Guiana.
