= Cosmosoma beatrix =

Scientific classification
- Domain: Eukaryota
- Kingdom: Animalia
- Phylum: Arthropoda
- Class: Insecta
- Order: Lepidoptera
- Superfamily: Noctuoidea
- Family: Erebidae
- Subfamily: Arctiinae
- Genus: Cosmosoma
- Species: C. beatrix

Binomial name
- Cosmosoma beatrix (H. Druce, 1884)

Synonyms
- Homoeocera beatrix H. Druce, 1884; Homoeocera scintillans H. Druce, 1884; Gymnelia beatrix (H. Druce, 1884)

Species of moth

Cosmosoma beatrix is a moth of the family Erebidae. It was described by Herbert Druce in 1884. It is found in Panama and Costa Rica.
