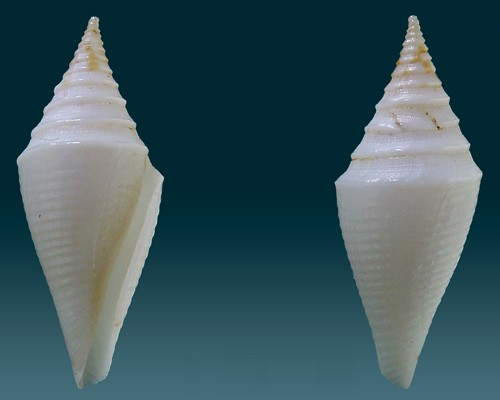
- Apertural and abapertural views of shell of Conus beatrix Tenorio, M.J., G.T. Poppe & S. Tagaro, 2007

Scientific classification
- Kingdom: Animalia
- Phylum: Mollusca
- Class: Gastropoda
- Subclass: Caenogastropoda
- Order: Neogastropoda
- Superfamily: Conoidea
- Family: Conidae
- Genus: Conus
- Species: C. beatrix

Binomial name
- Conus beatrix Tenorio, Poppe, & Tagaro, 2007

Synonyms
- Conus (Turriconus) beatrix Tenorio, Poppe & Tagaro, 2007 accepted, alternate representation; Kurodaconus beatrix (Tenorio, Poppe & Tagaro, 2007); Turriconus beatrix (Tenorio, Poppe & Tagaro, 2007)

= Conus beatrix =

Species of sea snail

Conus beatrix is a species of sea snail, a marine gastropod mollusc in the family Conidae, the cone snails and their allies.

Like all species within the genus Conus, these snails are predatory and venomous. They are capable of stinging humans, therefore live ones should be handled carefully or not at all.

== Description ==
The size of the shell varies between 14 mm and 31 mm.

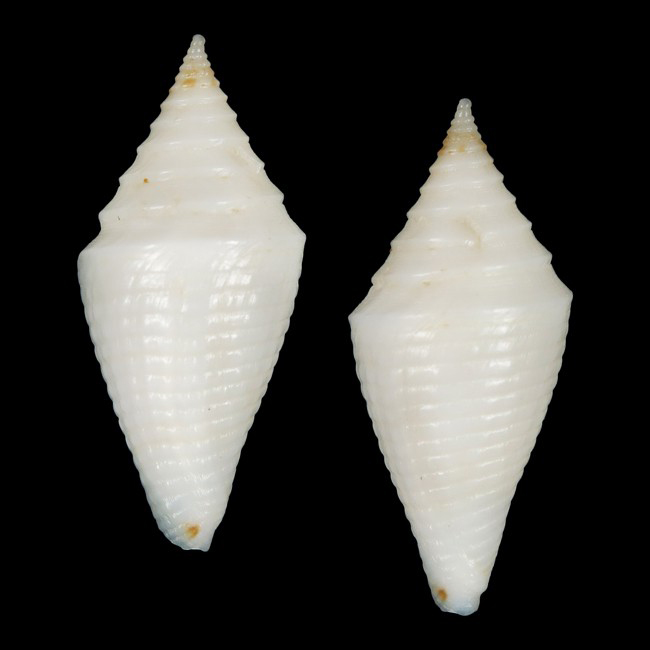
Conus beatrix

== Distribution ==
This marine species occurs off the Philippines.
