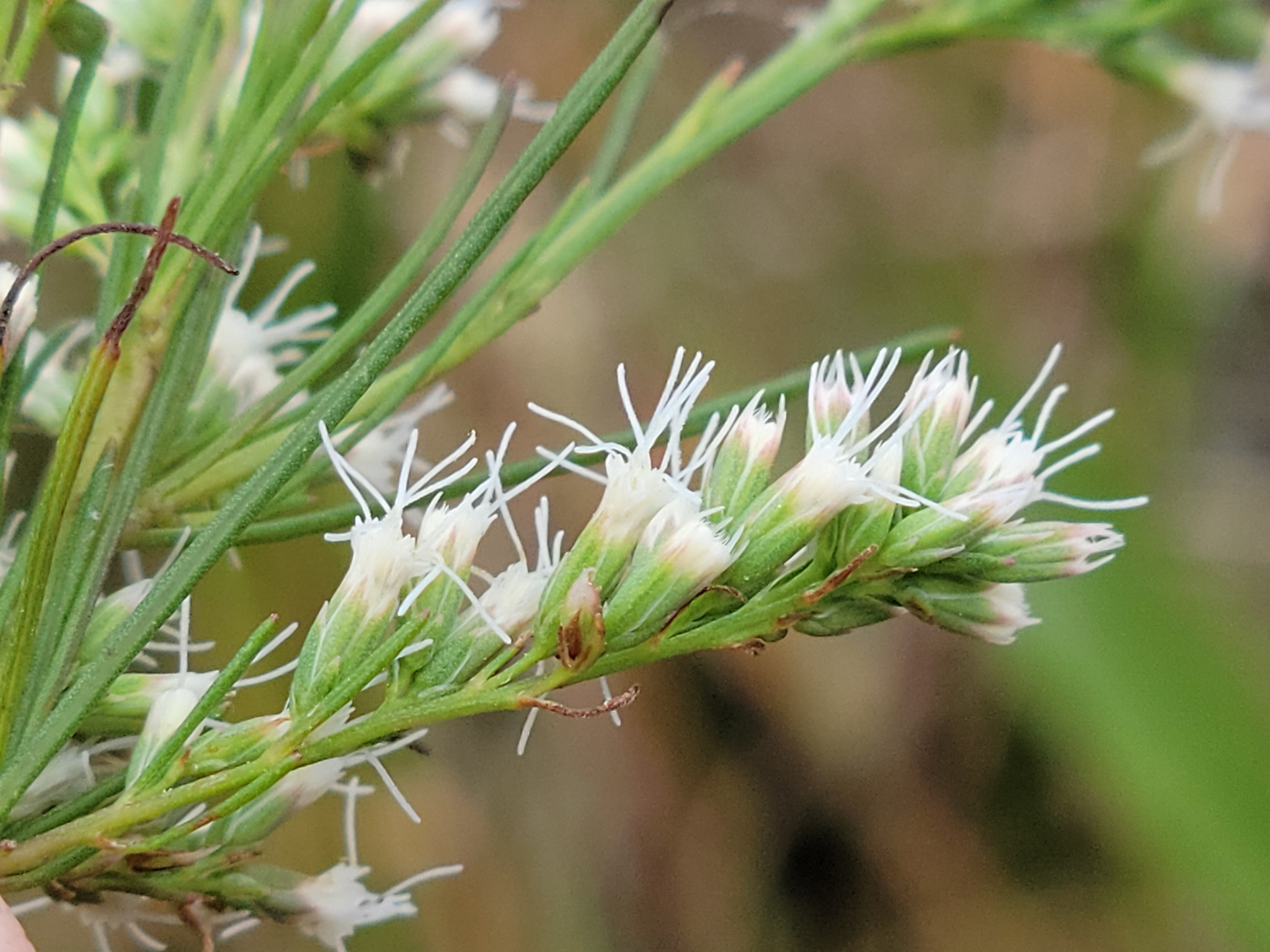

Conservation status
- Apparently Secure (NatureServe)

Scientific classification
- Kingdom: Plantae
- Clade: Tracheophytes
- Clade: Angiosperms
- Clade: Eudicots
- Clade: Asterids
- Order: Asterales
- Family: Asteraceae
- Genus: Eupatorium
- Species: E. leptophyllum

Binomial name
- Eupatorium leptophyllum DC.

Synonyms
- Eupatorium capillifolium var. leptophyllum (DC.) H.E. Ahles; Traganthes leptophylla (DC.) Greene

= Eupatorium leptophyllum =

False fennel

Species of flowering plant

Eupatorium leptophyllum, commonly called false fennel, is a herbaceous perennial plant in the family Asteraceae native to the southeastern United States from Mississippi to the Carolinas. Like other members of the genus Eupatorium, it is about one to two meters (40-80 inches) tall and has inflorescences containing a large number of tiny white flower heads, each with 5 disc florets but no ray florets. E. leptophyllum grows in wet areas and can grow in shallow water, often at the edges of ponds.
