= Tulip tree (disambiguation) =

A tulip tree is a member of the genus Liriodendron in family Magnoliaceae.

Tulip tree may also refer to:

- Markhamia lutea or Nile tulip tree, in family Bignoniaceae
- Magnolia, a genus in the family Magnoliaceae, especially,
  - Magnolia × soulangeana, the saucer magnolia
- Spathodea or African tulip tree, a genus in family Bignoniaceae
