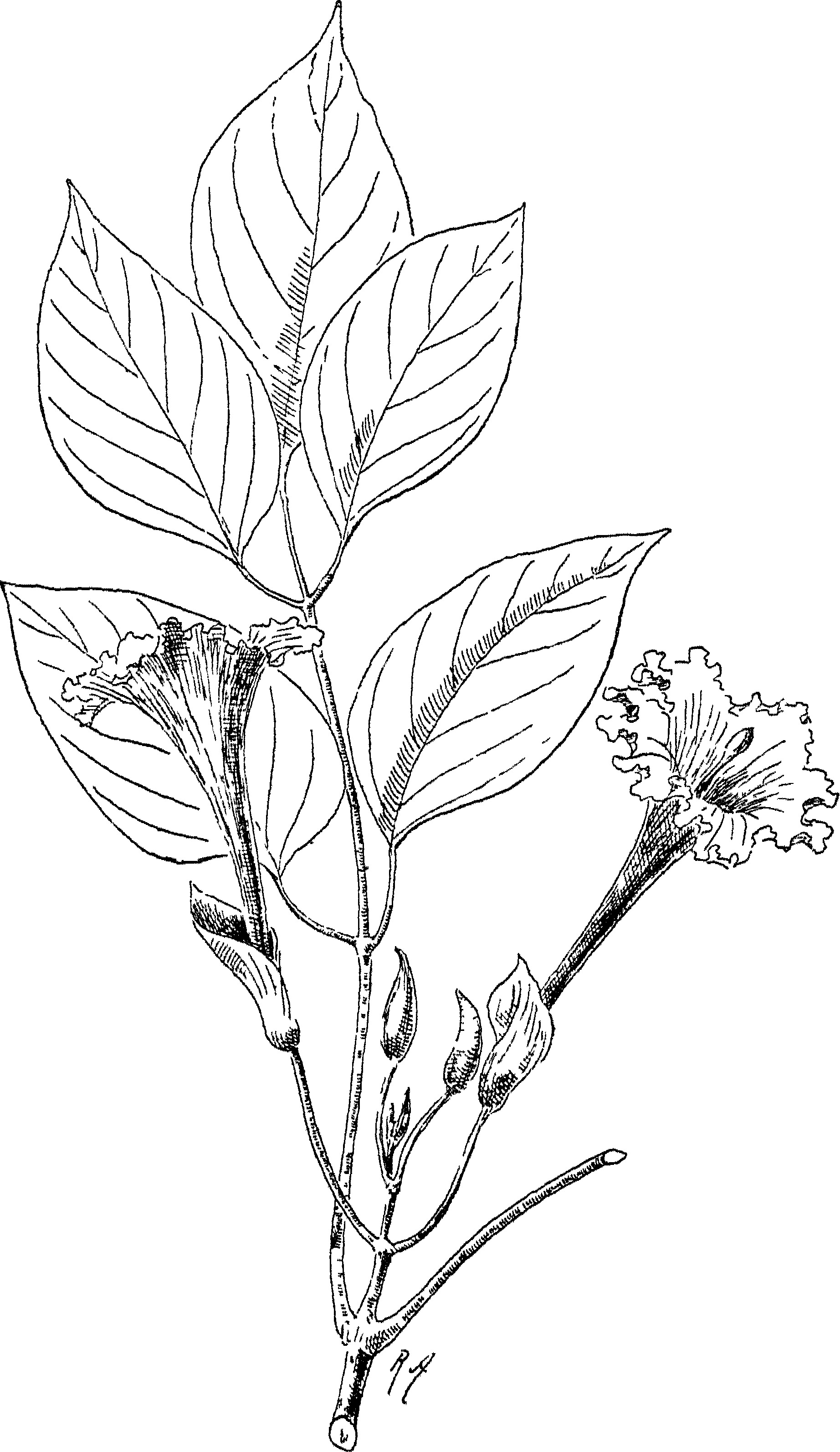

Conservation status
- Least Concern (IUCN 3.1)

Scientific classification
- Kingdom: Plantae
- Clade: Tracheophytes
- Clade: Angiosperms
- Clade: Eudicots
- Clade: Asterids
- Order: Lamiales
- Family: Bignoniaceae
- Genus: Dolichandrone
- Species: D. spathacea

Binomial name
- Dolichandrone spathacea (L.f.) Seem.

Synonyms
- Bignonia spathacea L.f.; Dolichandrone longissima (Lour.) K.Schum.; Dolichandrone rheedei (Spreng.) Seem.; Spathodea diepenhorstii Miq.; Spathodea grandiflora Zipp. ex Span.; Spathodea longiflora P.Beauv.; Spathodea loureiroana DC.; Spathodea luzonica Blanco; Spathodea rheedei Spreng.; Spathodea rostrata Span.

= Dolichandrone spathacea =

Species of flowering plant

Dolichandrone spathacea, also known as tui or mangrove trumpet tree, is a species of plant in the family Bignoniaceae.

== Distribution and habitat ==
The species is native to a wide area of tropical Asia and the Pacific, from South India and Sri Lanka to New Caledonia.

== Uses ==
The flower is edible and it is part of Thai cuisine, where it is known as dok khae thale or dok khae pa, being sometimes confused with Markhamia stipulata—also having the alternative name แคป่า dok khae pa in Thai. The Dolichandrone spathacea flower, however, is white and not yellowish or red and looks thinner. It is usually eaten sauteed or in Kaeng som.

In Southeast Asia, the leaves and barks are used as traditional herbal medicine which is used to treat bacterial infections such as oral thrush, bronchitis, and gastrointestinal diseases.

== See also ==
- Markhamia stipulata, also known as แคป่า khae pa in Thai
- Sesbania grandiflora, known as ดอกแค khae in Thai
- List of Thai ingredients
