= Butter board =

Dish

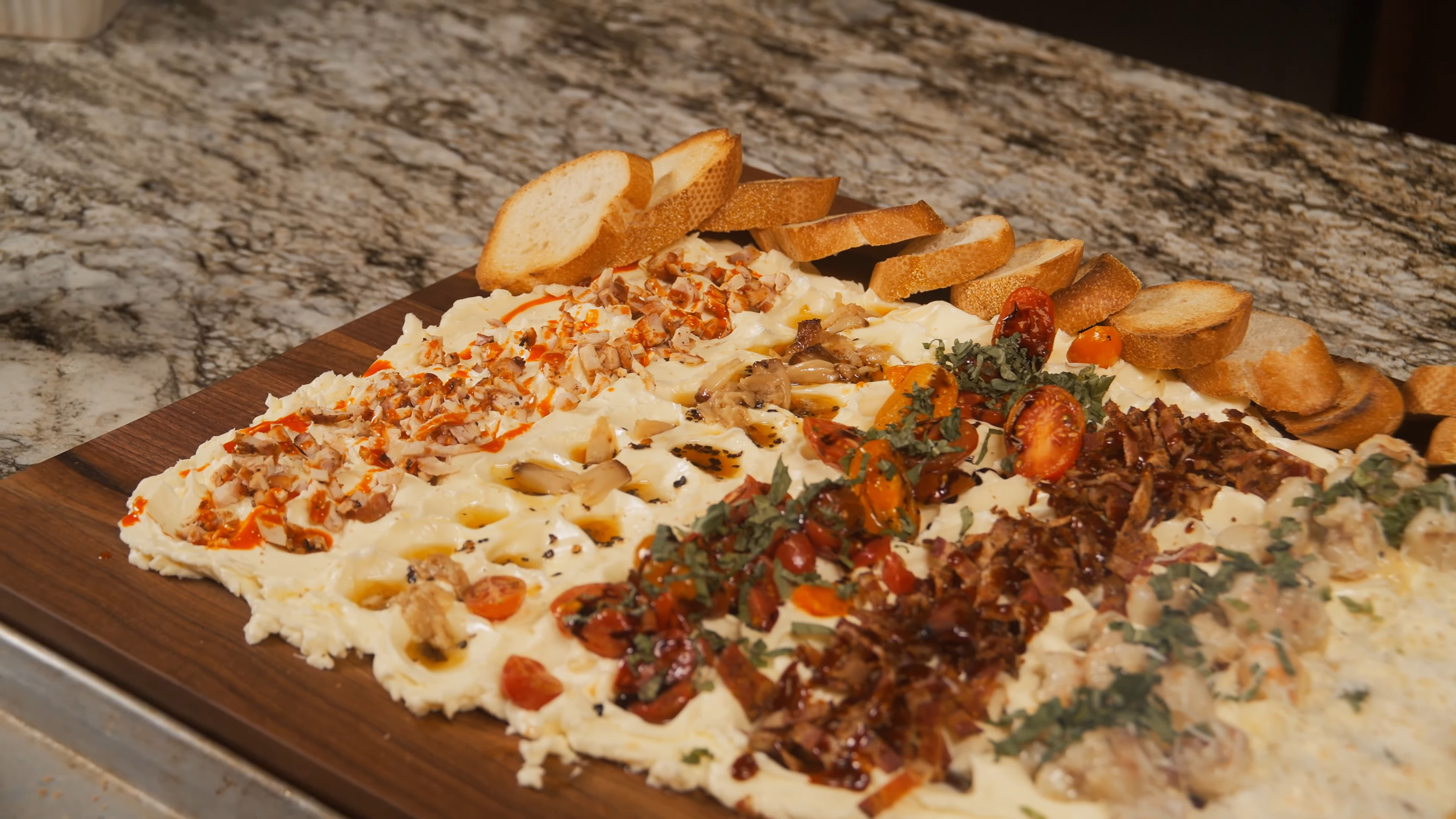
A butter board, with bread

A butter board is a dish consisting of soft butter, spread over a wooden cutting board, and sprinkled with condiments, ingredients and edible decorations such as salt, pepper, chili flakes, honey, lemon zest, fruit or vegetable slices, herbs or edible flowers. The dish is served with slices of bread and eaten communally as diners scrape the butter off the board and spread it on their bread.

The butter board first appeared in the 2017 cookbook Six Seasons: A New Way With Vegetables by Joshua McFadden. It was popularized in 2022 by a viral video on TikTok by the food blogger Justine Doiron, whom media credited with spreading the butter board trend.
