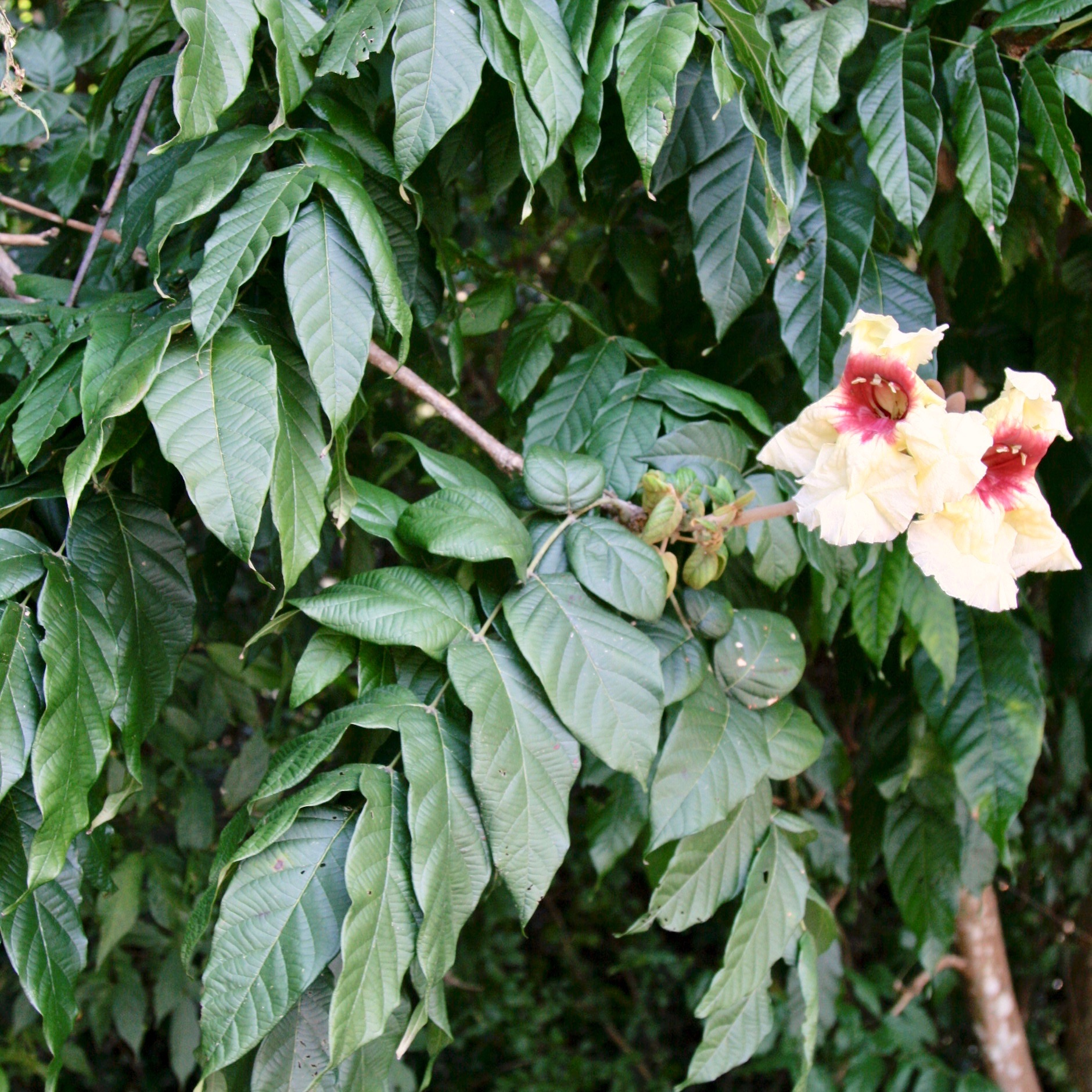
- Markhamia stipulata

Scientific classification
- Kingdom: Plantae
- Clade: Tracheophytes
- Clade: Angiosperms
- Clade: Eudicots
- Clade: Asterids
- Order: Lamiales
- Family: Bignoniaceae
- Clade: Crescentiina
- Clade: Paleotropical clade
- Genus: Markhamia; Seem.ex Baill.

Species
- See text

Synonyms
- Muenteria Seem.

= Markhamia =

Genus of flowering plants

Markhamia is a genus of flowering plants in the family Bignoniaceae; most species are recorded from Africa, with the type species M. stipulata found in southern China and Indochina. The genus is named after Clements Markham.

== Species ==
Plant of the World Online includes:

1. Markhamia lutea (Benth.) K.Schum.
2. Markhamia obtusifolia (Baker) Sprague
3. Markhamia stipulata (Wall.) Seem. - type species
4. Markhamia tomentosa (Benth.) K.Schum. ex Engl.
5. Markhamia zanzibarica (Bojer ex DC.) K.Schum.

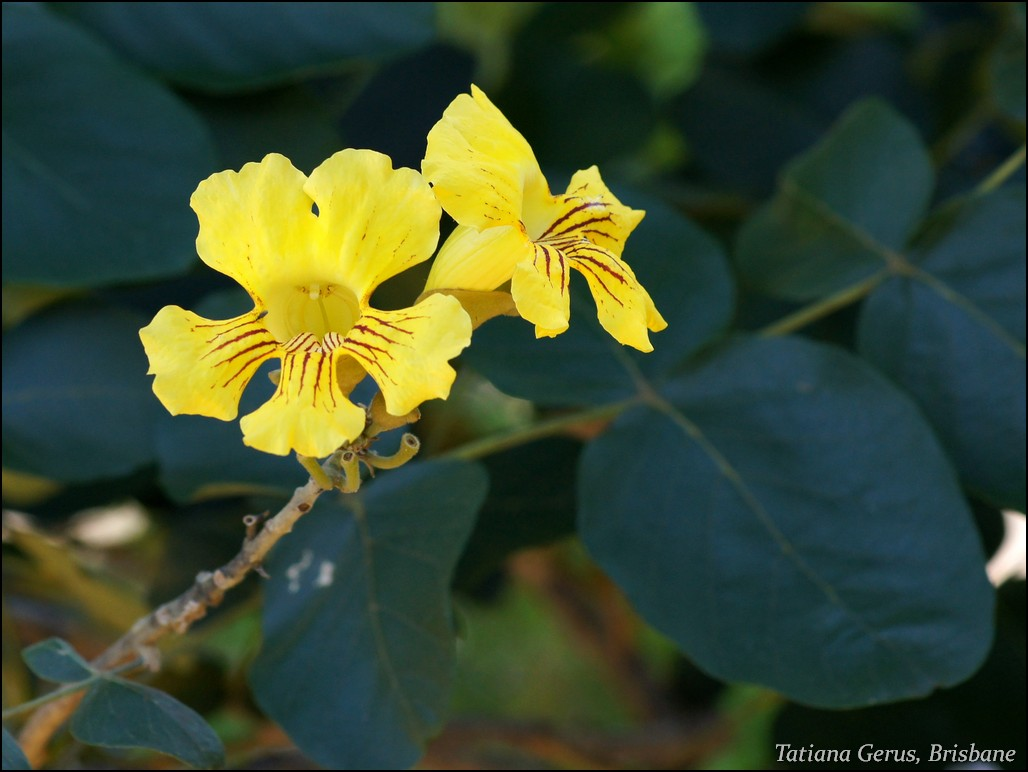
Markhamia obtusifolia
