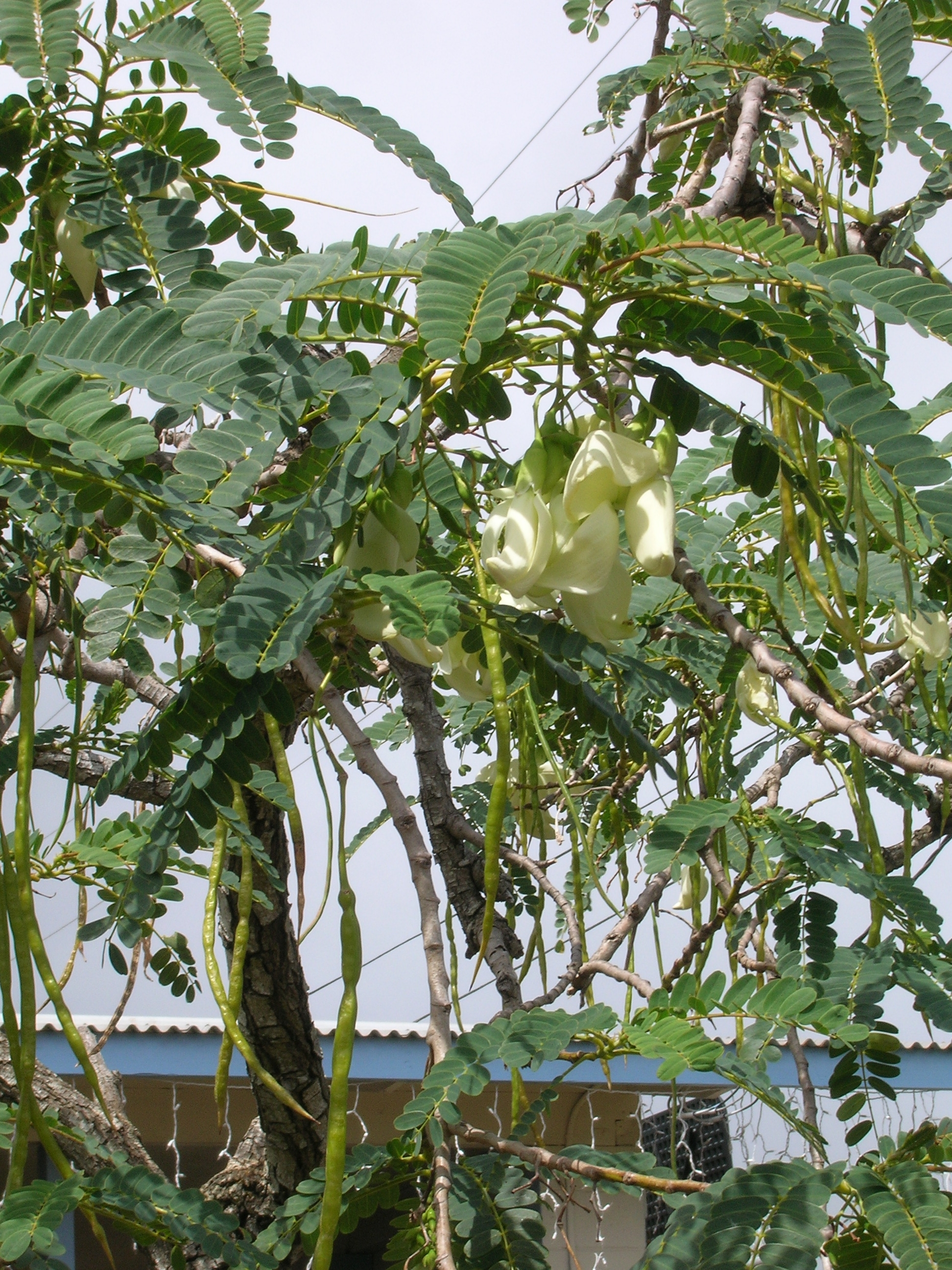

Scientific classification
- Kingdom: Plantae
- Clade: Tracheophytes
- Clade: Angiosperms
- Clade: Eudicots
- Clade: Rosids
- Order: Fabales
- Family: Fabaceae
- Subfamily: Faboideae
- Clade: Robinioids
- Tribe: Sesbanieae
- Genus: Sesbania
- Species: S. grandiflora

Binomial name
- Sesbania grandiflora (L.) Poir.

Synonyms
- Aeschynomene grandiflora (L.) L.; Agati grandiflora (L.) Desv.; Agati grandiflora var. albiflora Wight & Arn.; Coronilla grandiflora (L.) Willd.; Dolichos arborescens G.Don; Dolichos arboreus Forssk.; Emerus grandiflorus (L.) Hornem.; Resupinaria grandiflora (L.) Raf.; Robinia grandiflora L.; Sesbania mannii Sachet

= Sesbania grandiflora =

Species of legume

Sesbania grandiflora, common names vegetable hummingbird, katurai, agati, agastya, agasya, kathurumurunga and West Indian pea, is a leguminous tree of family Fabaceae native to Malesia, including Malaysia, New Guinea, and the Philippines. It is widely distributed globally in equatorial regions. The flowers are eaten in Southeast and South Asia.

== Description ==
Sesbania grandiflora is a leguminous tree of family Fabaceae. It is fast-growing and soft-wooded, and it grows to heights of 5–20 metres (16–66 feet). The leaves are regular and rounded, and grow to 15–30 cm (6–12 in) long, with leaflets in 10–20 pairs or more and an odd one. The flowers white, red or pink and are oblong, 1.5–10 cm (1–4 in) long in lax, with two to four flower racemes. The calyx is campanulate and shallowly two-lipped. These flowers have mild fragrance too. The fruits, or seed pods, look like flat, long, thin green beans. They are slender, falcate or straight, and 30–45 cm (12–18 in) long, with a thick suture, and each contains approximately thirty 8 mm (0.3 in) seeds. The tree thrives under full exposure to sunshine and is extremely frost sensitive.

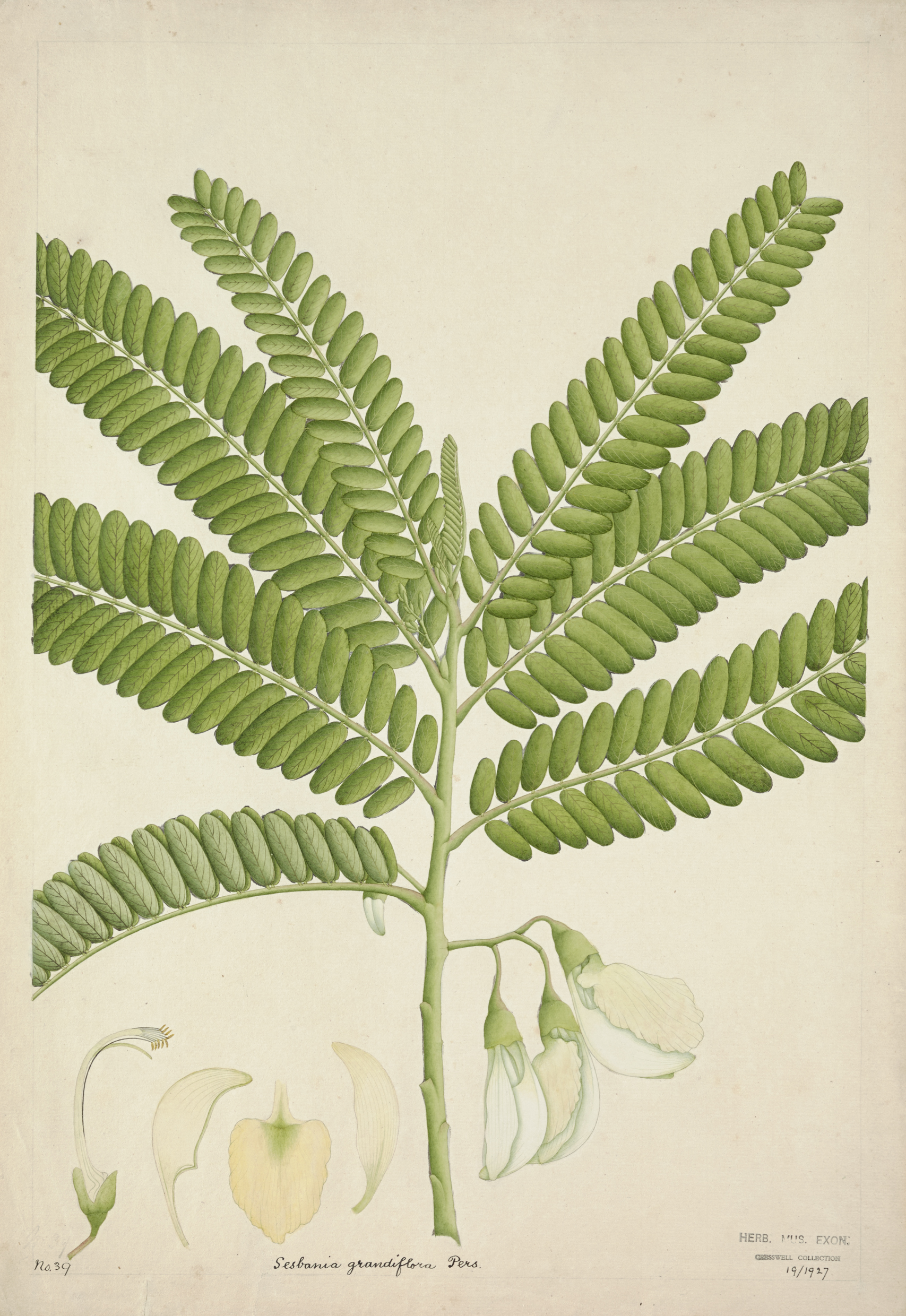
Botanical illustration

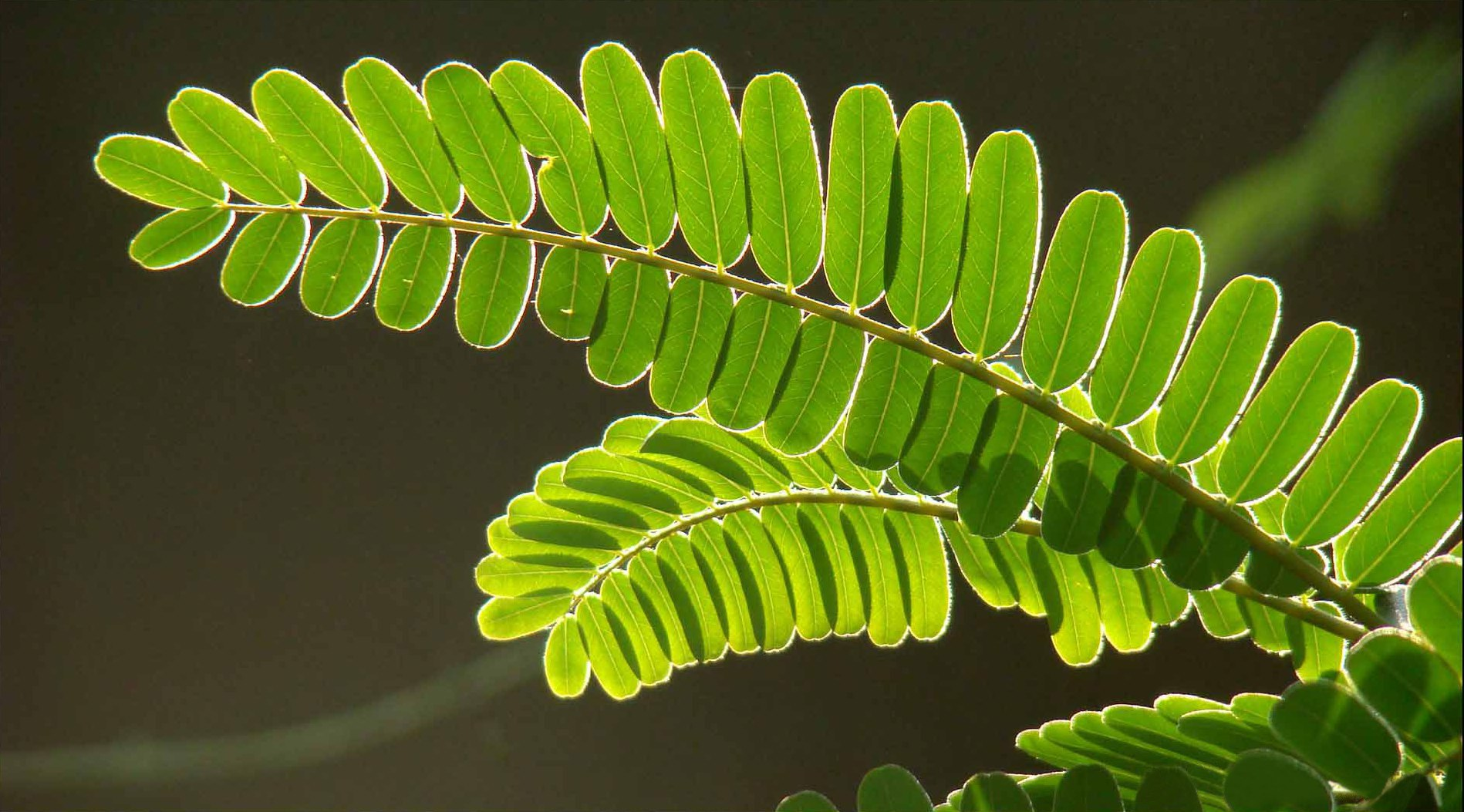
Close-up of leaves

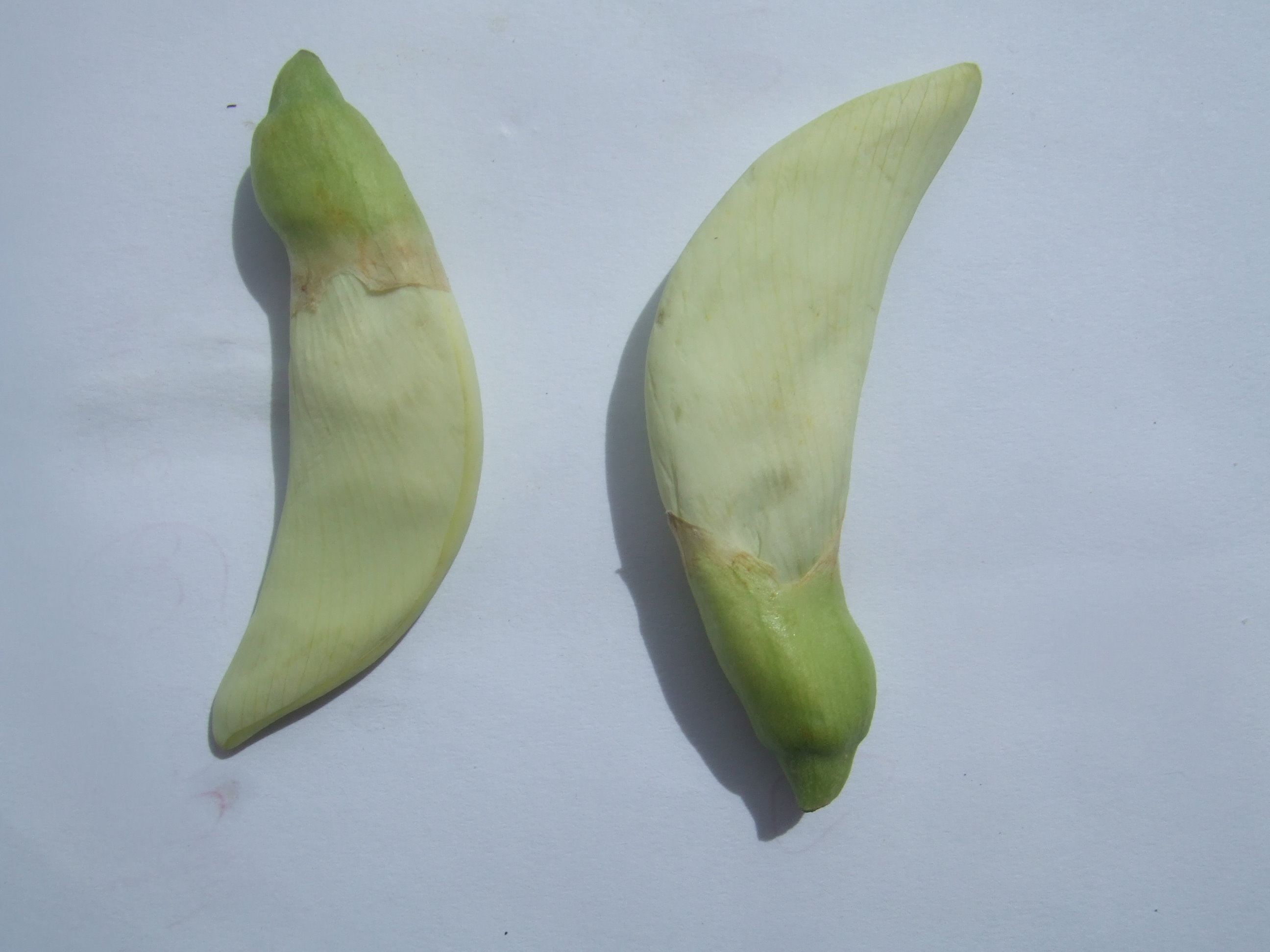
Detached flower buds

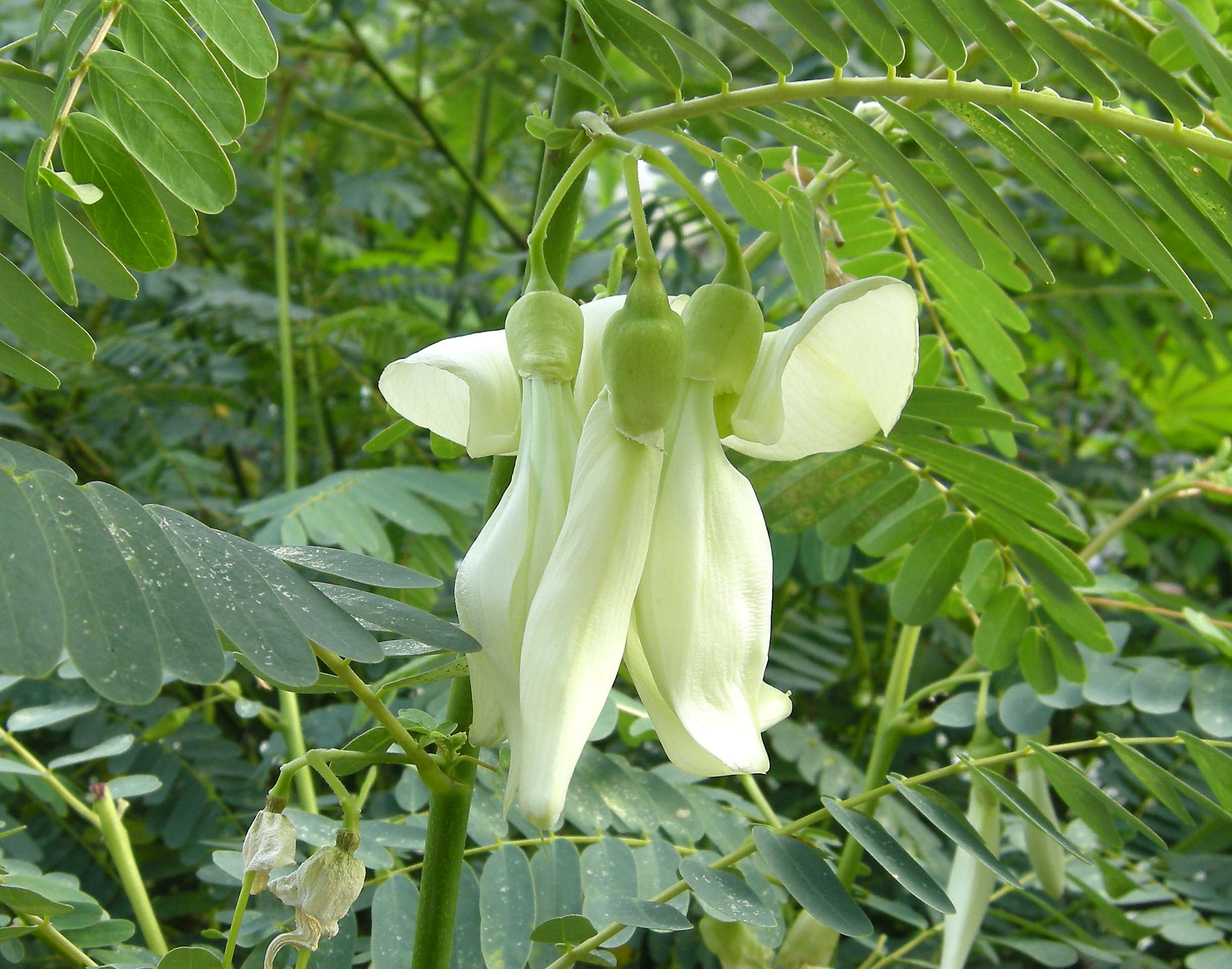
Blooming flowers hanging

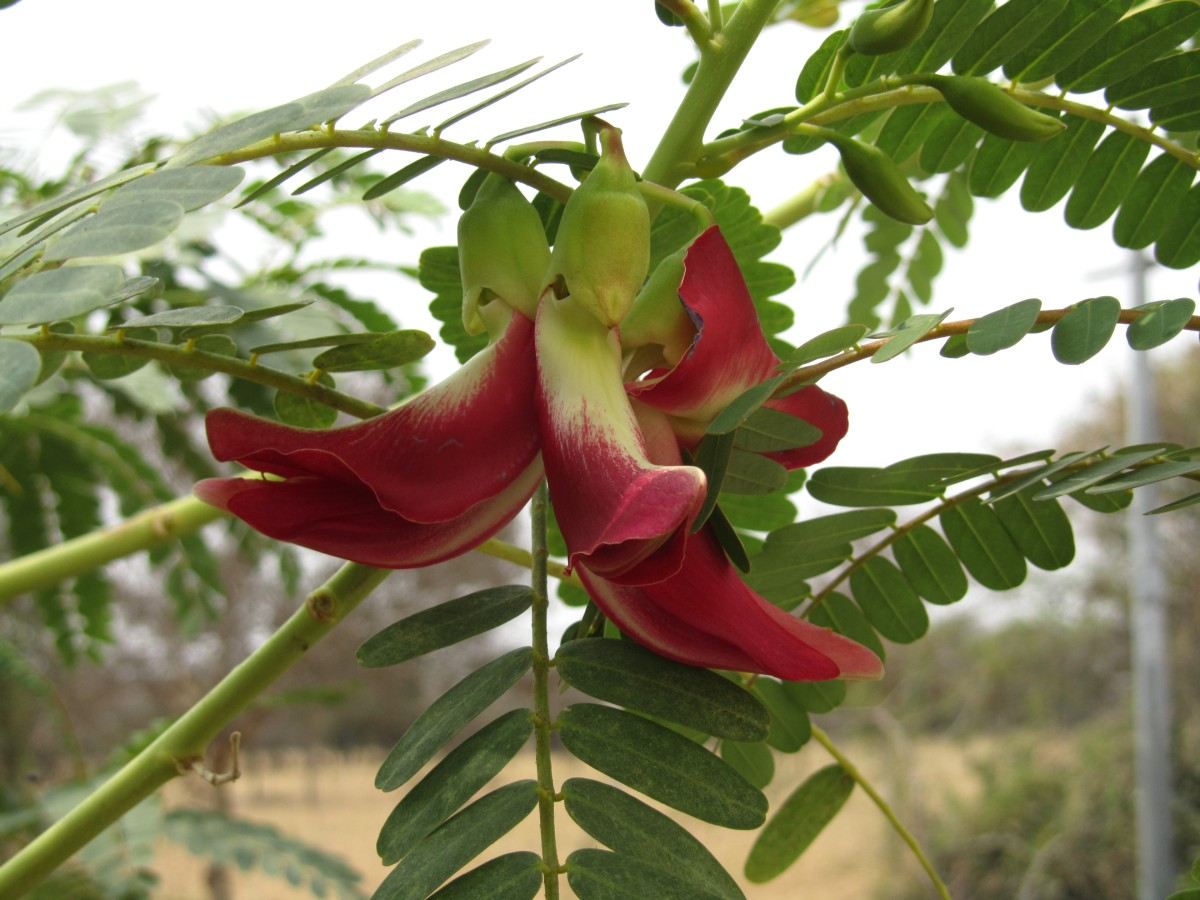
Red-flowered variant

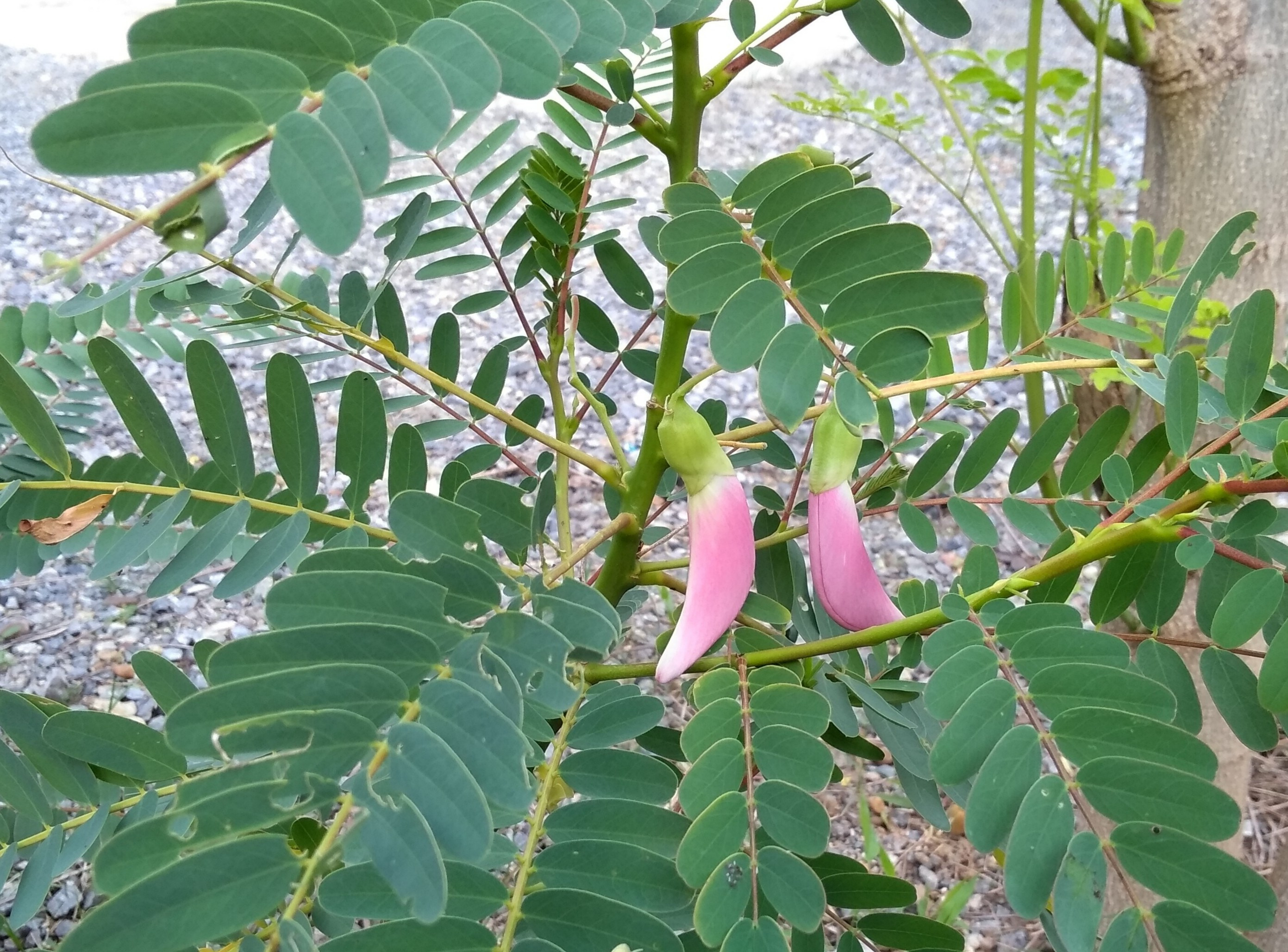
Pink-flowered variety

== Distribution and habitat ==
It is native to Maritime Southeast Asia (Malaysia, Indonesia, Philippines, Brunei) to New Guinea. It is cultivated in many parts of South India and Southeast Asia. It grows where there is good soil and a hot, humid climate.

== Toxicity ==
Feed from the seed can be deadly to chickens.

== Uses ==
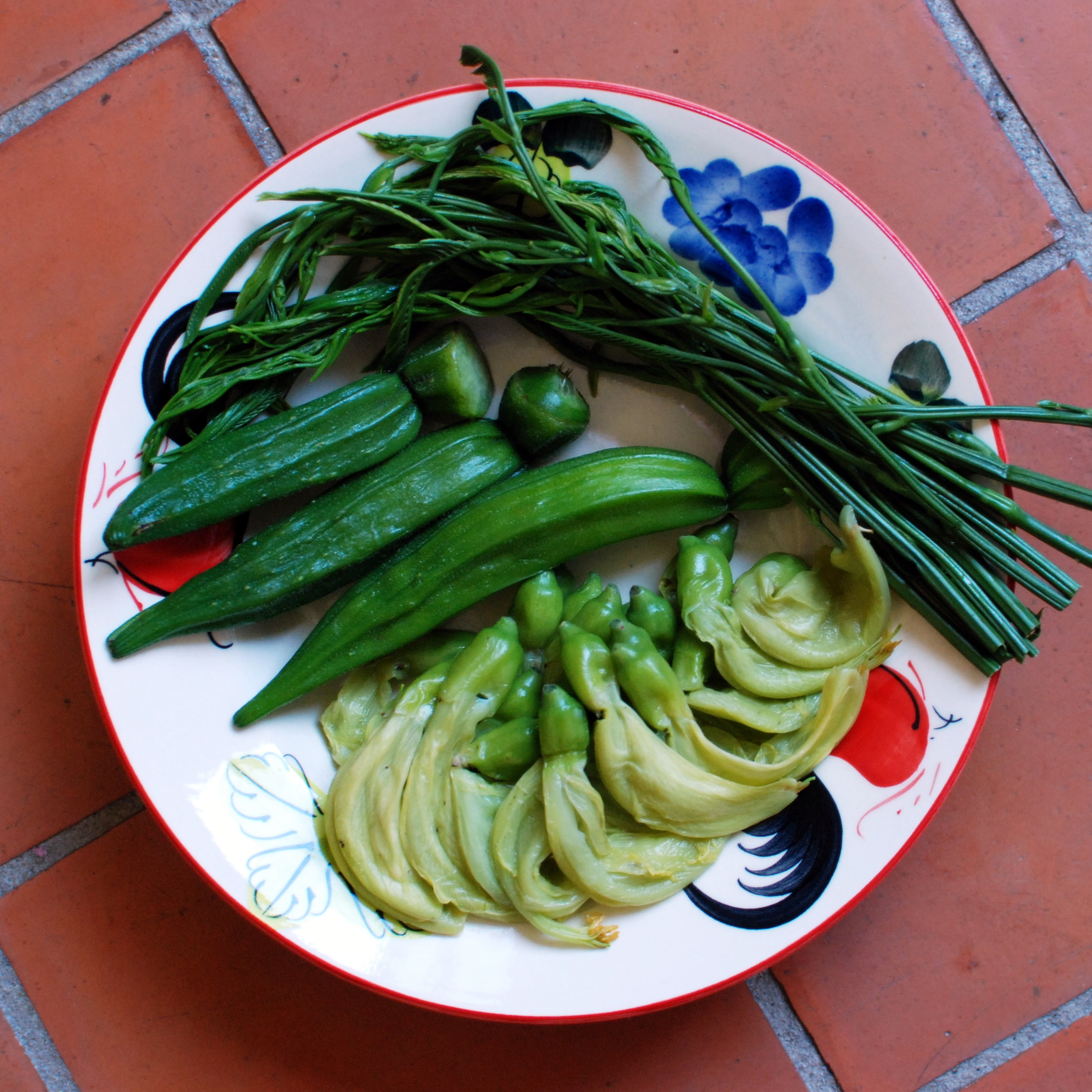
Steamed flowers (bottom) with other vegetables in a Thai dish

S. grandiflora has many traditional uses. Its flowers are 92% water, 7% carbohydrates, 1% protein, and contain no fat. In a reference amount of 100 grams (3.5 oz), the flowers supply 27 calories, and are a rich source of vitamin C (88% of the Daily Value, DV) and folate (26% DV).

=== Culinary ===
The flowers of S. grandiflora are eaten as a vegetable in Southeast Asia, including Java and Lombok in Indonesia, the Ilocos Region of the Philippines, Vietnam, Laos, and Thailand. In the Thai language, the flowers are called ดอกแค (dok khae) and are used in the cuisine both cooked in curries, such as kaeng som and kaeng khae, and raw or blanched with nam phrik. The flowers are also prominently used in Cambodian cuisine and are associated with the Bon Om Touk. The flower's stamen is generally discarded before use. In addition to raw and blanched, the flowers can also be battered and deep fried. In some parts of West Bengal in India the flowers are locally called Bok ful resembling the Egret bird from Heron family of birds. The flowers are a part of the Bengali cuisine as they are battered and fried and the fritters are served with meals. In many parts of India the flowers are called Agastya Phool because these flowers bloom in the month of Agastya (August) of Sharad Ritu (Autumn) as per Ayurveda and is used to prepare Pakora or dry curry.

The leaves are also edible. The leaves are eaten young. The seed pods are also consumed, similarly only when young.

The leaves are sometimes available commercially, but flowers and seed pods come primarily from kitchen gardens. The common name of the flower is Heron Flower. It is very popular in Assam, India where it is known as Bok Phool. However, it is not available in abundance in Assam.

Leaves and flowers (particularly of the white-flowered variety) of කතුරු මුරුංගා (kathurumurunga) are commonly consumed in Sri Lankan cuisine, where it is cultivated in home gardens. The flowers are often stir-fried or batter fried, while the leaves are incorporated into mallum, cooked into a curry with coconut milk, or deep-fried.

=== Fodder ===
It is used to make highly nutritional fodder for ruminants like cattle, but it is deadly to chickens.

== See also ==
- Sesbania bispinosa
- Dolichandrone spathacea, known as Dok khae thale in Thai
- Markhamia stipulata, known as Dok khae hua mu in Thai
- Edible flowers
- List of Thai ingredients
