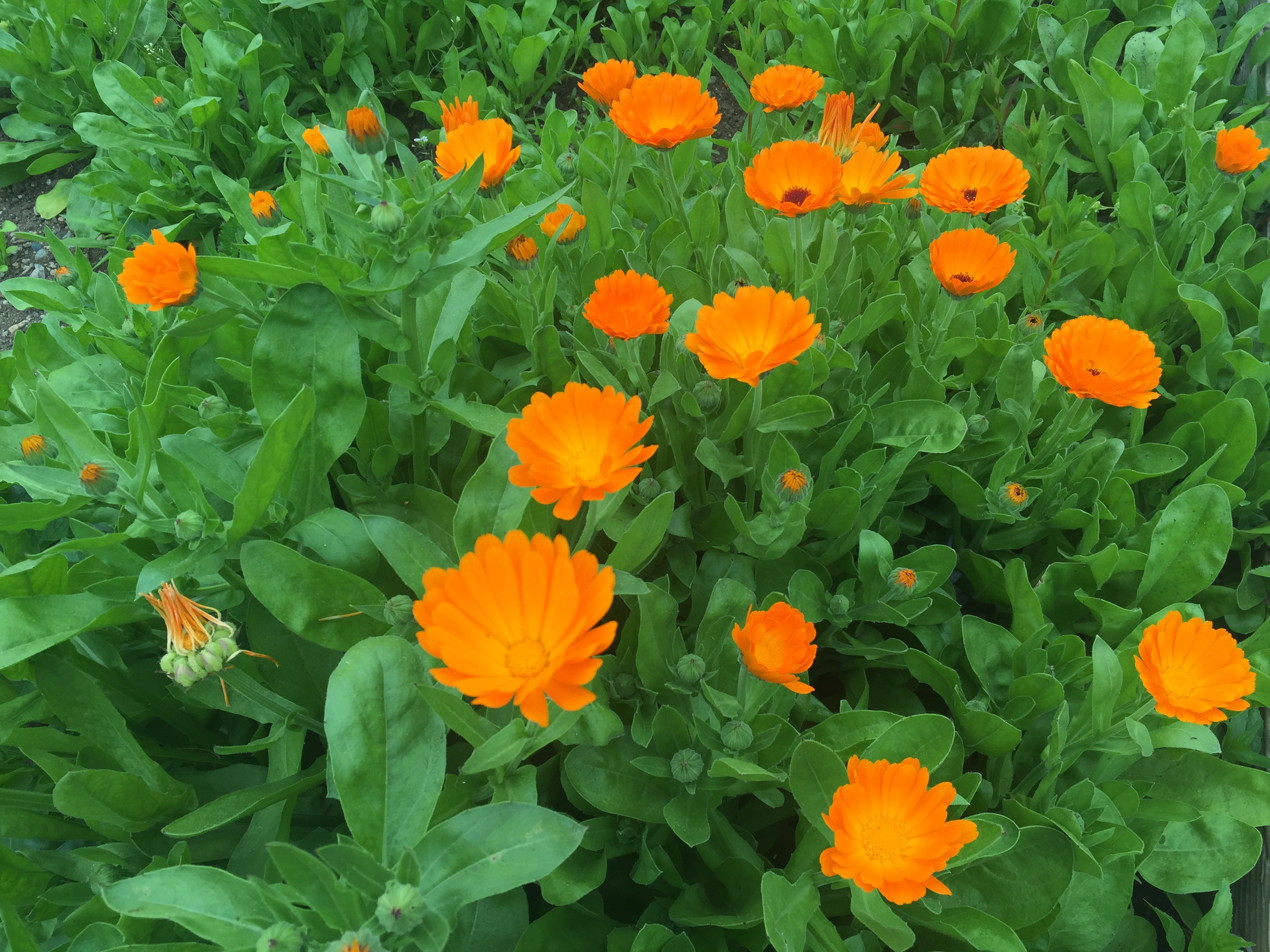
- UBC Botanical Garden

Scientific classification
- Kingdom: Plantae
- Clade: Embryophytes
- Clade: Tracheophytes
- Clade: Angiosperms
- Clade: Eudicots
- Clade: Asterids
- Order: Asterales
- Family: Asteraceae
- Genus: Calendula
- Species: C. officinalis

Binomial name
- Calendula officinalis L.

Synonyms
- Calendula aurantiaca Kotschy ex Boiss.; Calendula eriocarpa DC.; Calendula hydruntina (Fiori) Lanza; Calendula prolifera Hort. ex Steud.; Calendula × santamariae Font Quer; Caltha officinalis (L.) Moench

= Calendula officinalis =

Species of flowering plant in the daisy family

Calendula officinalis, Mary's gold, common marigold, the pot marigold, Scotch marigold, or ruddles, is a flowering plant in the daisy family, Asteraceae. It is probably native to southern Europe, but its long history of cultivation makes its precise origin unknown, and it is widely naturalised. The florets are edible and the plant has historically been used as medicine.

The names marigold and Mary's gold were given by the English people to honour Mary, mother of Jesus, who was said to wear "a crown of gold that circles the earth".

== Description ==
Calendula officinalis is a short-lived aromatic herbaceous perennial, growing to 80 cm (31 in) tall, with sparsely branched lax or upright stems. The leaves are oblong-lanceolate, 5–17 cm (2–7 in) long, hairy on both sides, and with margins entire or occasionally waved or weakly toothed.

The inflorescences are yellow or orange, comprising a thick capitulum or flowerhead 4–7 cm (1 1/2–3 in) diameter surrounded by two rows of hairy bracts. In the wild plant they have a single ring of ray florets surrounding the central disc florets. The disc florets are tubular and hermaphroditic and generally of a more intense orange-yellow color than the female, tridentate, peripheral ray florets. The flowers may appear all year long where conditions are suitable. The fruit is a thorny curved achene.

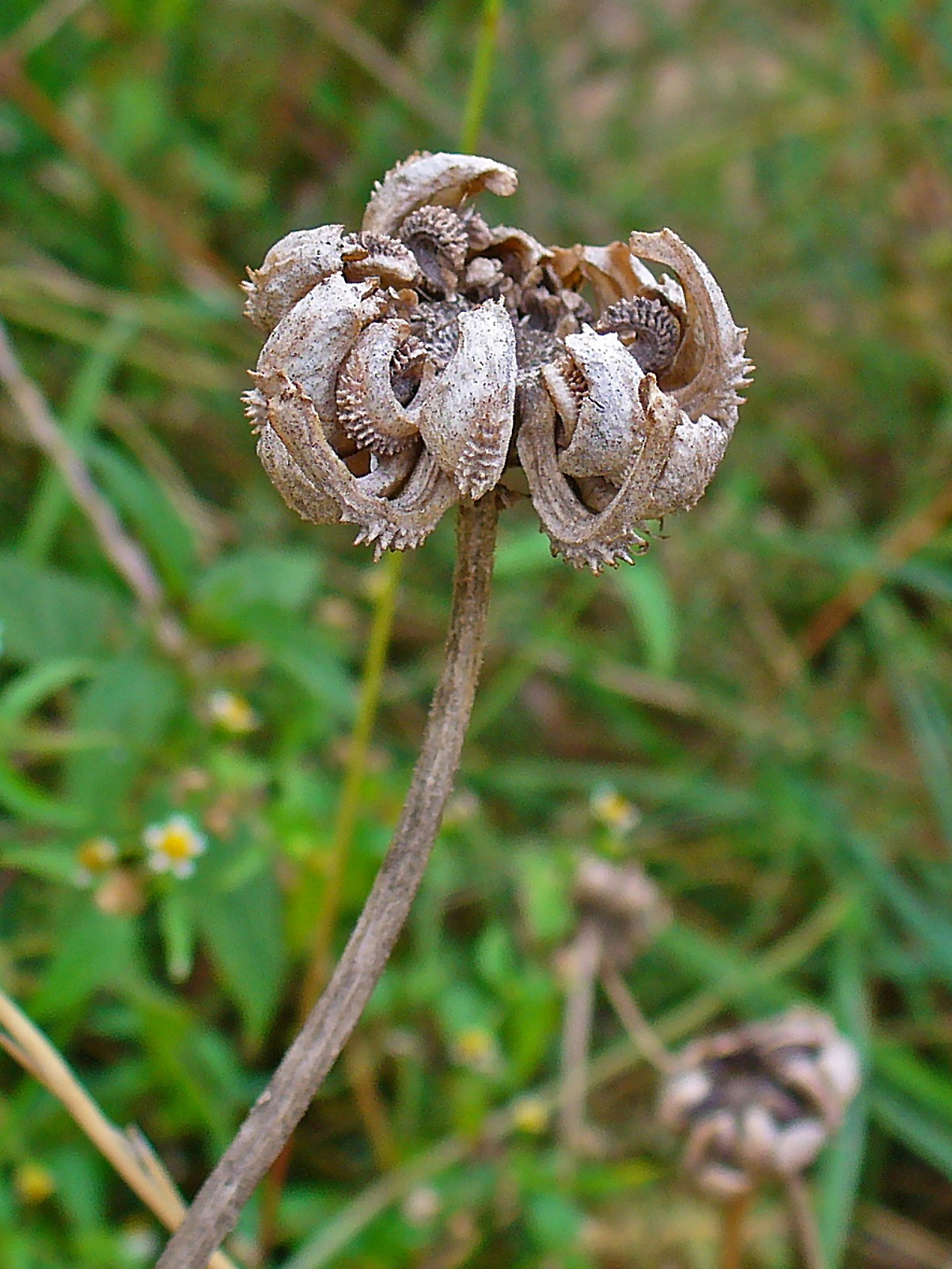
Infrutescence

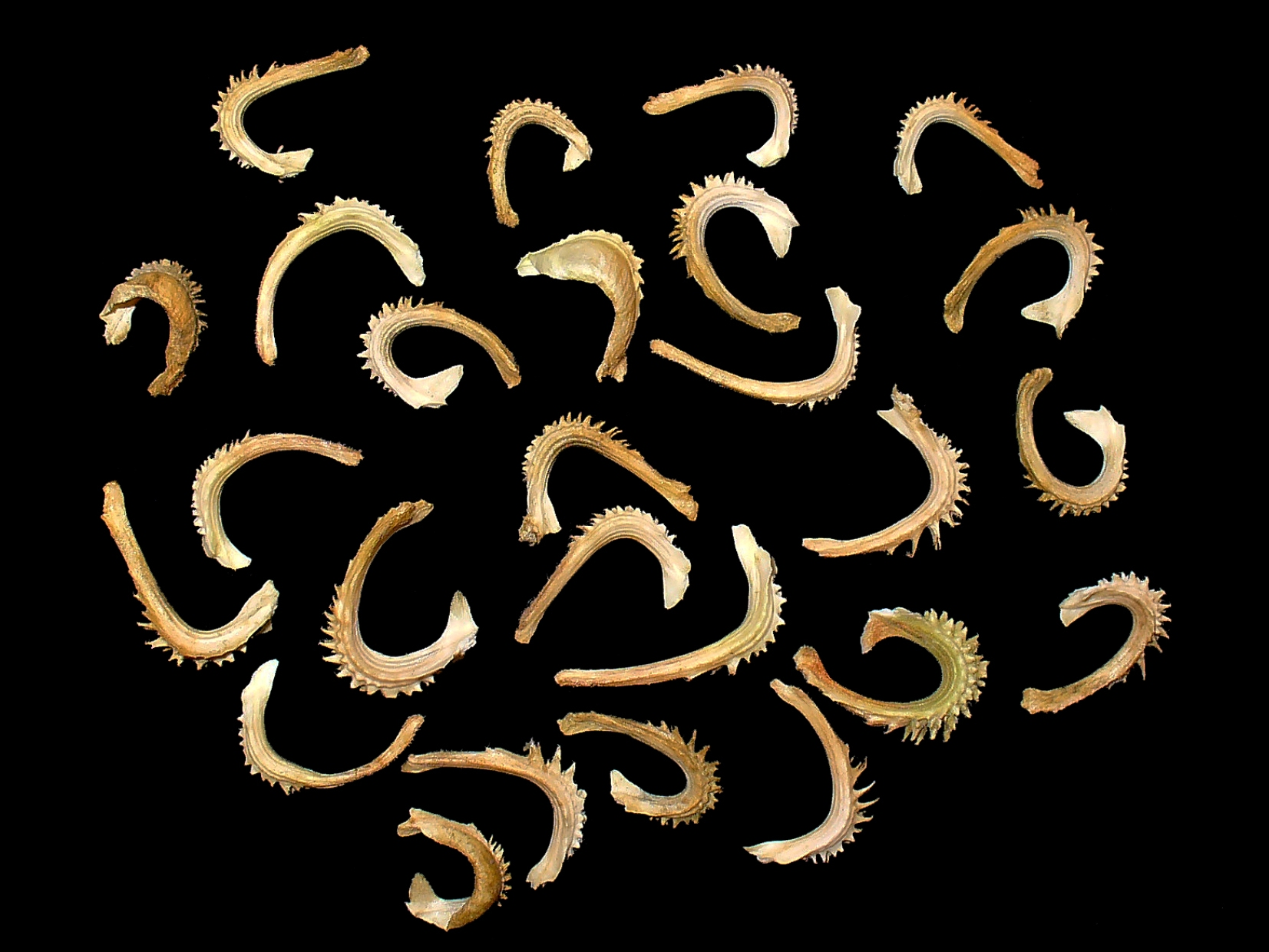
Seeds

=== Chemistry ===
The petals and pollen contain triterpenoid esters, as well as carotenoids flavoxanthin and auroxanthin (antioxidants and the source of the yellow-orange coloration). The leaves and stems contain other carotenoids, mostly lutein (80%), zeaxanthin (5%), and beta-carotene.

The flowers contain flavonol glycosides, triterpene oligoglycosides, oleanane-type triterpene glycosides, saponins, and a sesquiterpene glucoside.

== Taxonomy ==
The Latin specific epithet officinalis refers to the plant's medicinal and herbal uses.

== Distribution and habitat ==
It is probably native to southern Europe, though its long history of cultivation makes its precise origin unknown. It is also widely naturalised further north in Europe (as far north as southern England) and elsewhere in warm temperate regions of the world.

== Ecology ==
Calendulas are used as food plants by the larvae of some Lepidoptera species including cabbage moth, gothic moth, large yellow underwing, and setaceous Hebrew character.

== Cultivation ==
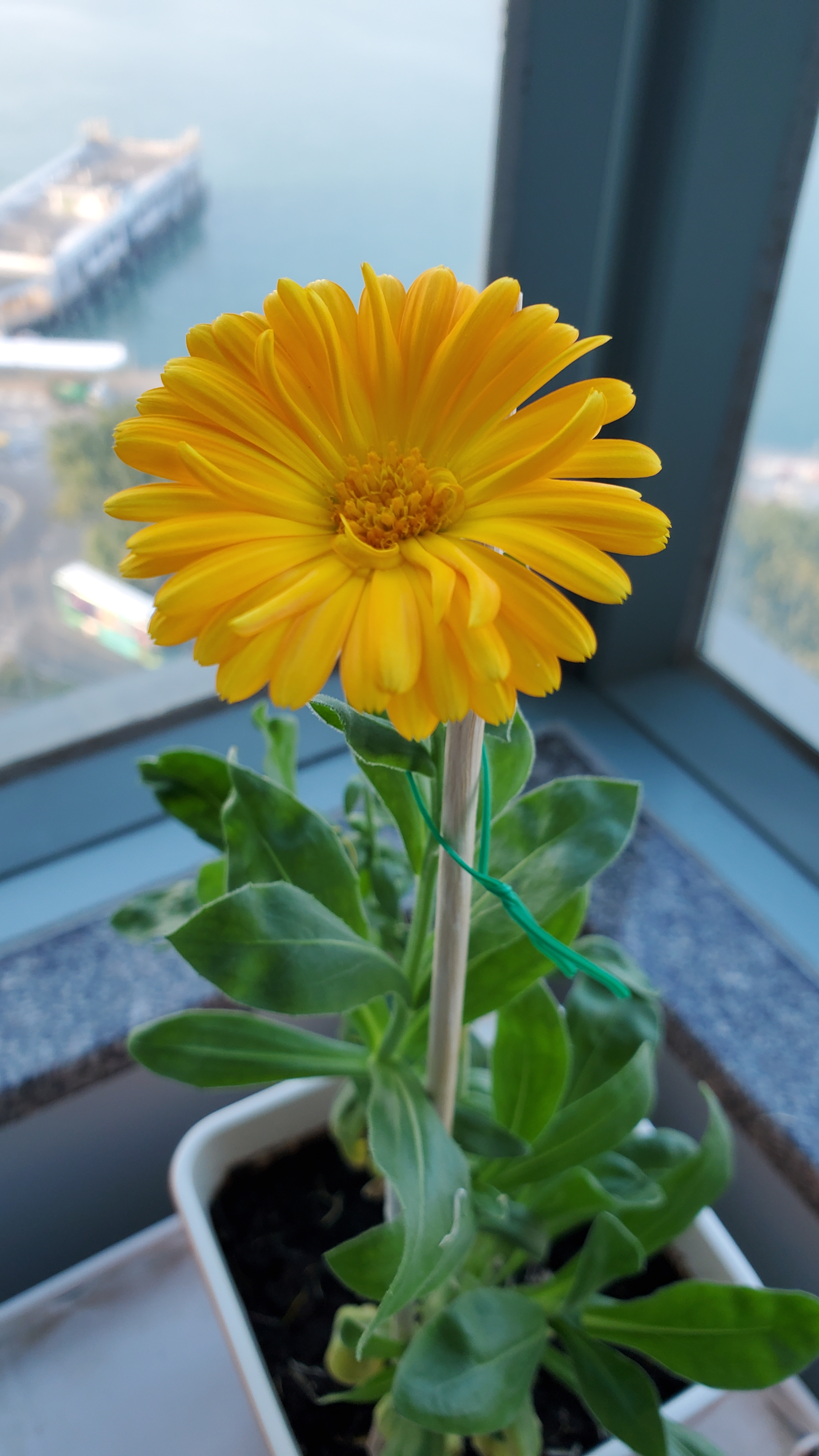
An Asian indoor breed

Calendula officinalis is widely cultivated and can be grown easily in sunny locations in most kinds of soils. Although perennial, it is commonly treated as an annual, particularly in colder regions where its winter survival is poor, and in hot summer locations where it also does not survive.

Calendulas are considered by many gardening experts as among the easiest and most versatile flowers to grow in a garden, especially because they tolerate most soils. In temperate climates, seeds are sown in spring for blooms that last throughout the summer and well into the fall. In areas of limited winter freezing, seeds are sown in autumn for winter color. Plants will wither in subtropical summer. Seeds will germinate freely in sunny or half-sunny locations, but plants do best if planted in sunny locations with rich, well-drained soil. Pot marigolds typically bloom quickly from seed (in under two months) in bright yellows, golds, and oranges.

Most cultivars have a spicy aroma. It is recommended to deadhead (remove dying flower heads) the plants regularly to maintain even blossom production.

=== Cultivars ===
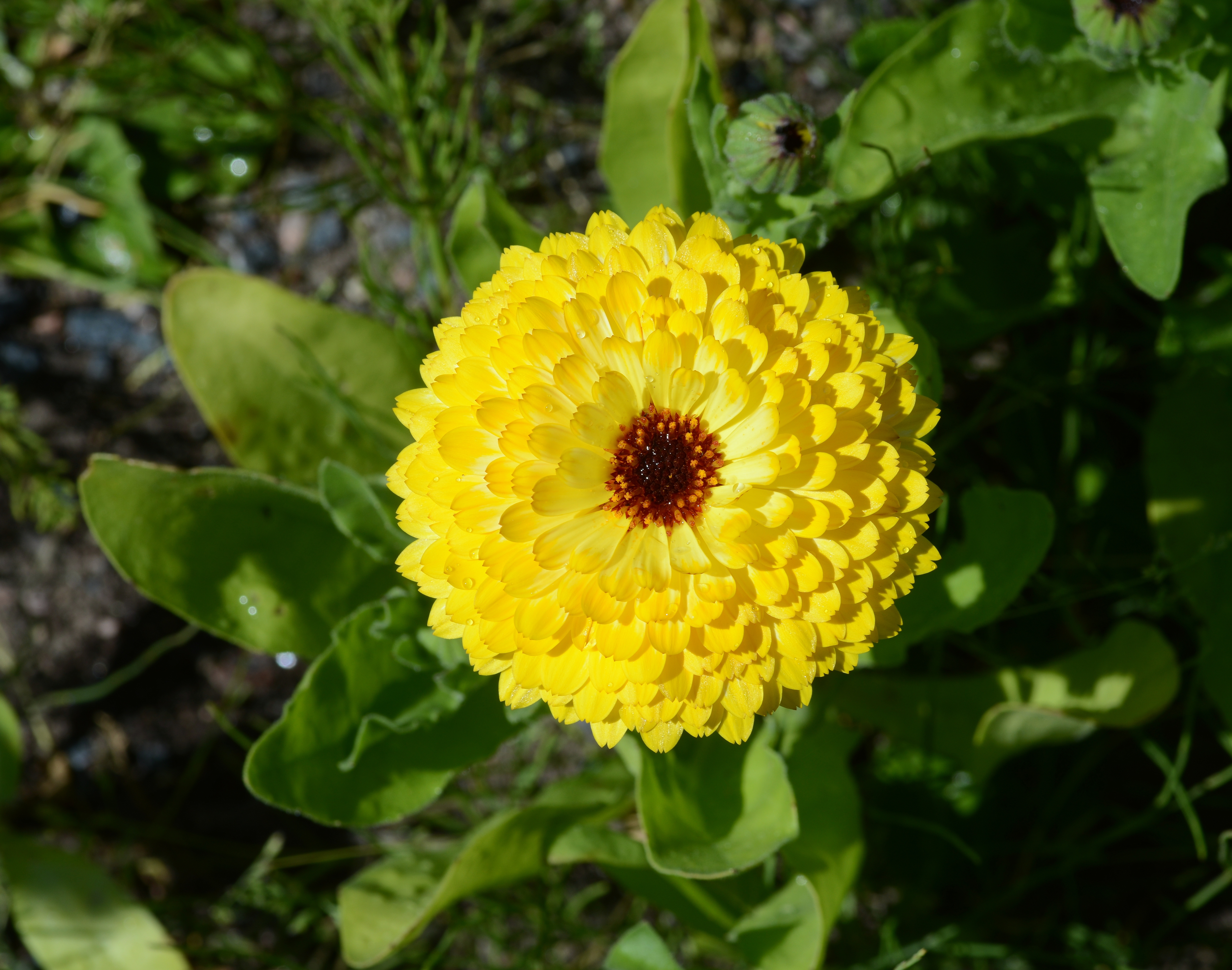
A double-flowered cultivar

Numerous cultivars have been selected to showcase a wide range of variations, spanning from pale yellow to orange-red, and with 'double' or 'semi-double' flowerheads with ray florets replacing some or all of the disc florets. Examples include 'Alpha' (deep orange), 'Jane Harmony', 'Sun Glow' (bright yellow), 'Lemon' (pale yellow), 'Orange Prince' (orange), 'Indian Prince' (dark orange-red), 'Pink Surprise' (double, with inner florets darker than outer florets), 'Green-heart Gold' (double, bright yellow), 'Apricot Pygmy' (double light peach) and 'Chrysantha' (yellow, double). Additionally, the cultivar 'Variegata' boasts yellow variegated leaves.

The cultivar group 'Fiesta Gitana' has been honoured with the Royal Horticultural Society's Award of Garden Merit.

== Uses ==
The florets are edible. They are often included in salads for their color or added to dishes as a garnish in lieu of saffron. While the leaves are also edible, they are generally not considered palatable, though historically they have been incorporated into potherb and salads. Additionally, the plant is utilized for making tea.

Flowers were used in ancient Greek, Roman, Middle Eastern, and Indian cultures as a medicinal herb, as well as a dye for fabrics, foods, and cosmetics. Many of these uses persist today. They are also used to make an oil that is widely used in skin products.

Marigold leaves can also be made into a poultice that is believed to help scratches and shallow cuts to heal faster and to prevent infection. It has also been used in eye drops.

Plant extracts are also widely used in cosmetics, presumably due to presence of compounds such as saponins, resins, and essential oils. The flowers are a rich source of lutein, containing 29.8 mg/100g.

=== Potential pharmacology ===
Plant pharmacological studies have suggested that Calendula extracts may have anti-viral, anti-genotoxic, and anti-inflammatory properties in vitro. In an in vitro assay, the methanol extract of C. officinalis exhibited antibacterial activity and both the methanol and the ethanol extracts showed antifungal activities.
