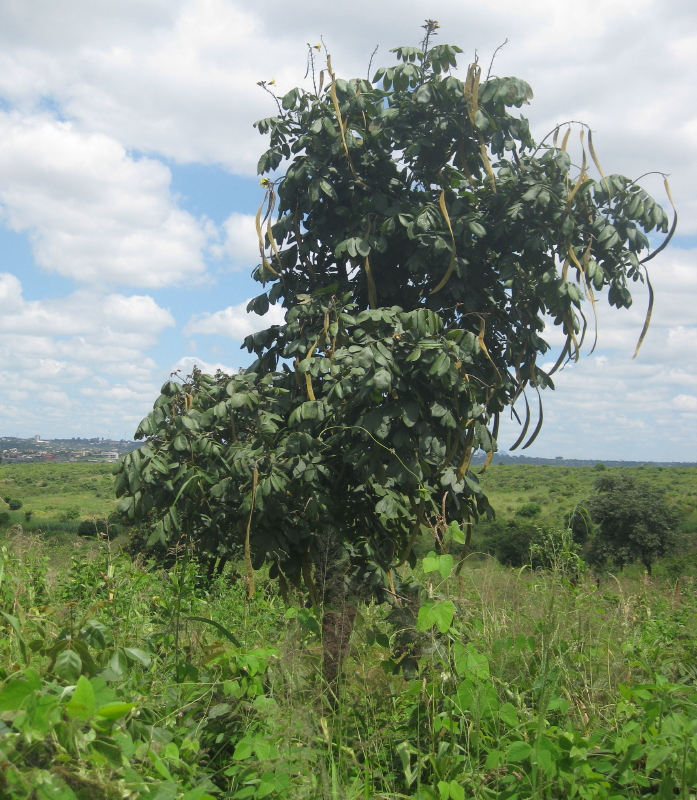
- Markhamia obtusifolia tree

Conservation status
- Least Concern (IUCN 3.1)

Scientific classification
- Kingdom: Plantae
- Clade: Tracheophytes
- Clade: Angiosperms
- Clade: Eudicots
- Clade: Asterids
- Order: Lamiales
- Family: Bignoniaceae
- Genus: Markhamia
- Species: M. obtusifolia

Binomial name
- Markhamia obtusifolia (Baker) Sprague

Synonyms
- Dolichandrone obtusifolia Baker; Markhamia lanata K.Schum.; Markhamia paucifoliolata De Wild.; Markhamia verdickii De Wild.

= Markhamia obtusifolia =

Species of plant

Markhamia obtusifolia is a species of plant in the family Bignoniaceae. It is found in Southern Africa.

This species usually grows as a shrub or small to medium tree, reaching heights of 5–15 m. Found in sparsely treed areas, such as fields. Flowers are yellow, and fruit is a long capsule shape.

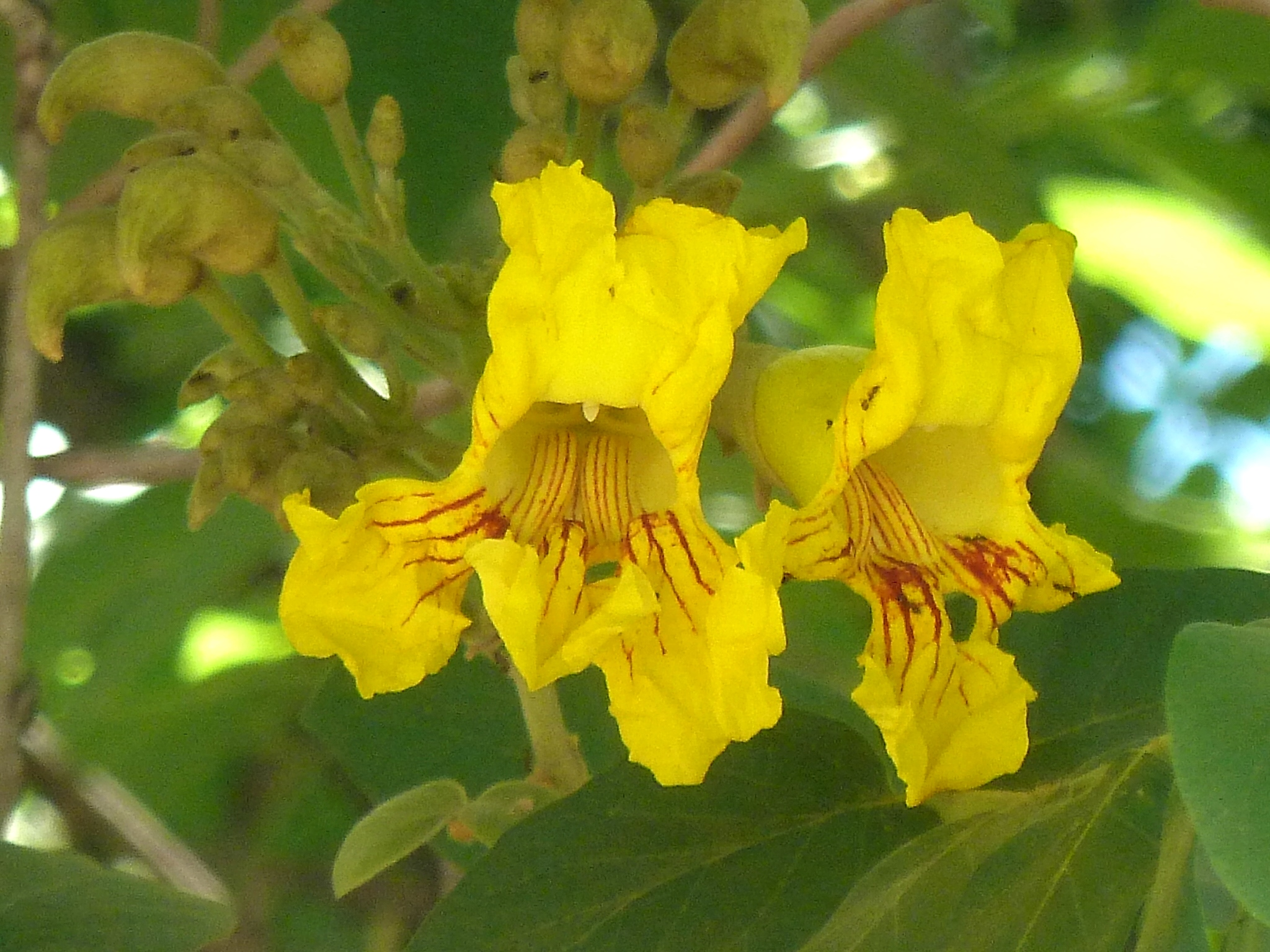
Flowers

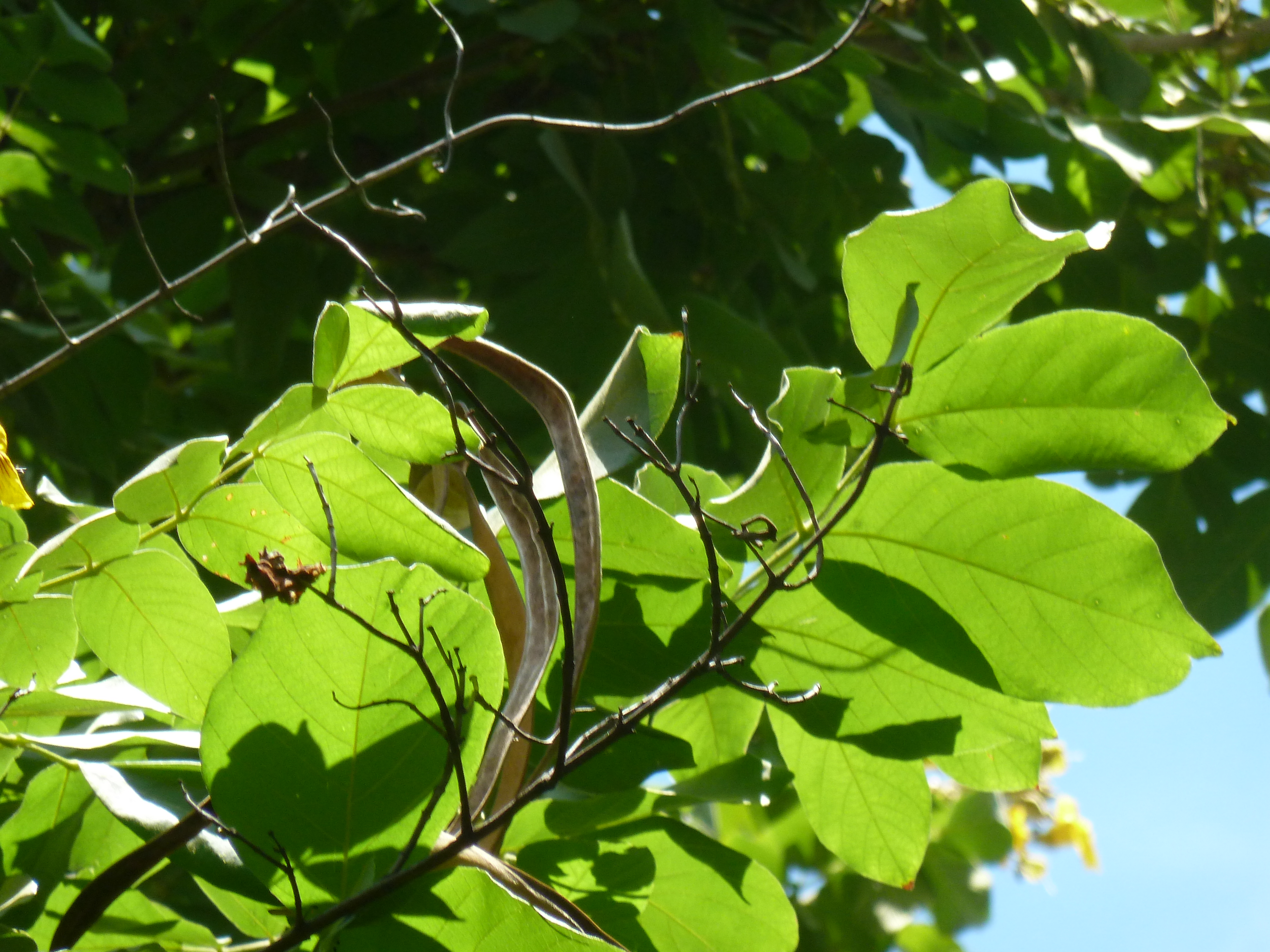
Fruit capsules
