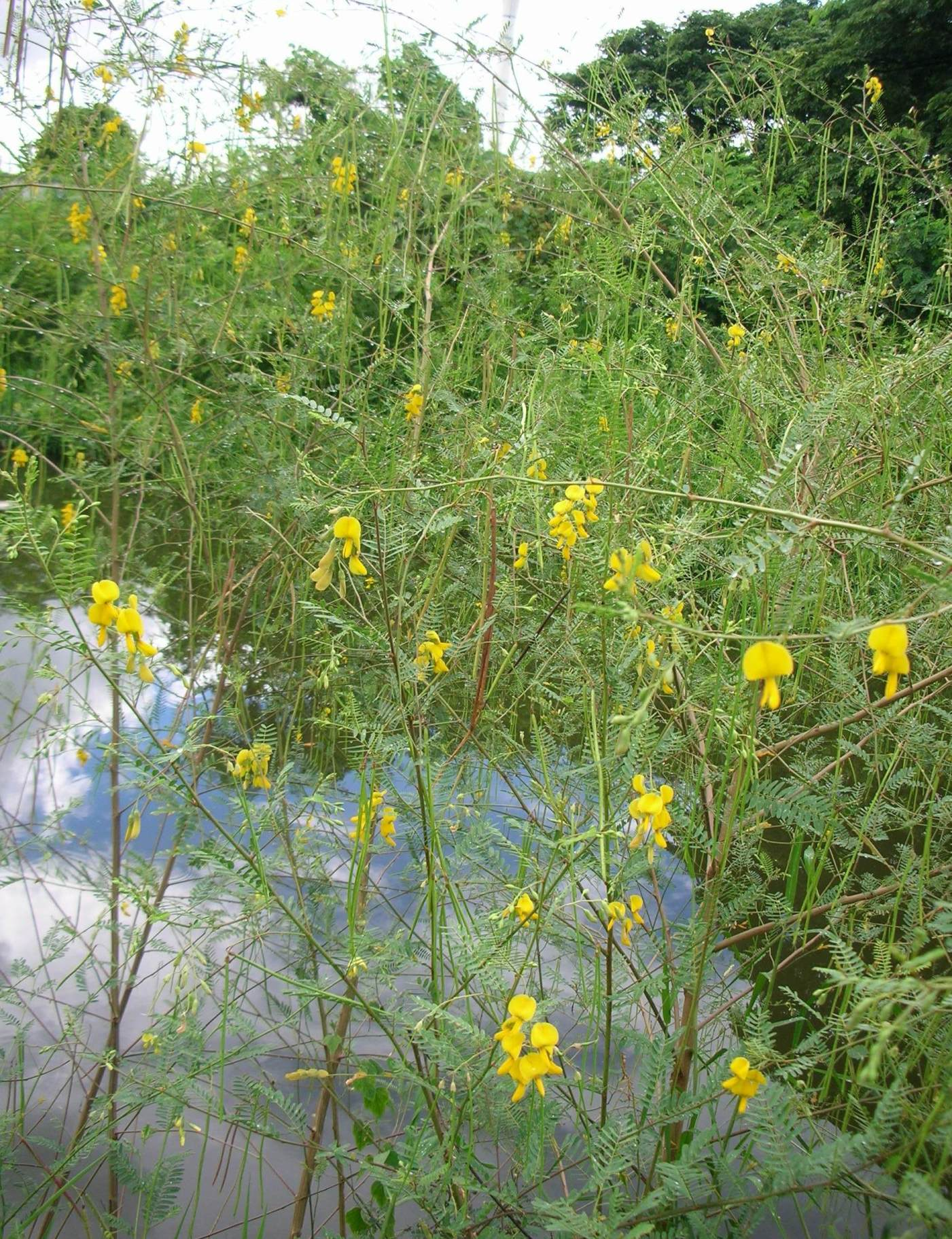

Scientific classification
- Kingdom: Plantae
- Clade: Tracheophytes
- Clade: Angiosperms
- Clade: Eudicots
- Clade: Rosids
- Order: Fabales
- Family: Fabaceae
- Subfamily: Faboideae
- Clade: Robinioids
- Tribe: Sesbanieae
- Genus: Sesbania
- Species: S. bispinosa

Binomial name
- Sesbania bispinosa (Jacq.) W.Wight

Synonyms
- Sesbania aculeata (Willd.) Pers. 1807

= Sesbania bispinosa =

Species of legume

The legume Sesbania bispinosa, also known as Sesbania aculeata (Willd.) Pers., is a small tree in the genus Sesbania.

== Names ==
The name Sesbania is taken from its Arabic name Siesaban "سيسبان". It is known by many common names, including danchi, dunchi, dhaincha, canicha, prickly sesban, jantar or spiny sesbania. In Vietnam, it is called điên điển gai or điền thanh gai. In Cambodia, it is called ស្នោ (Pka Snaô).

== Description ==
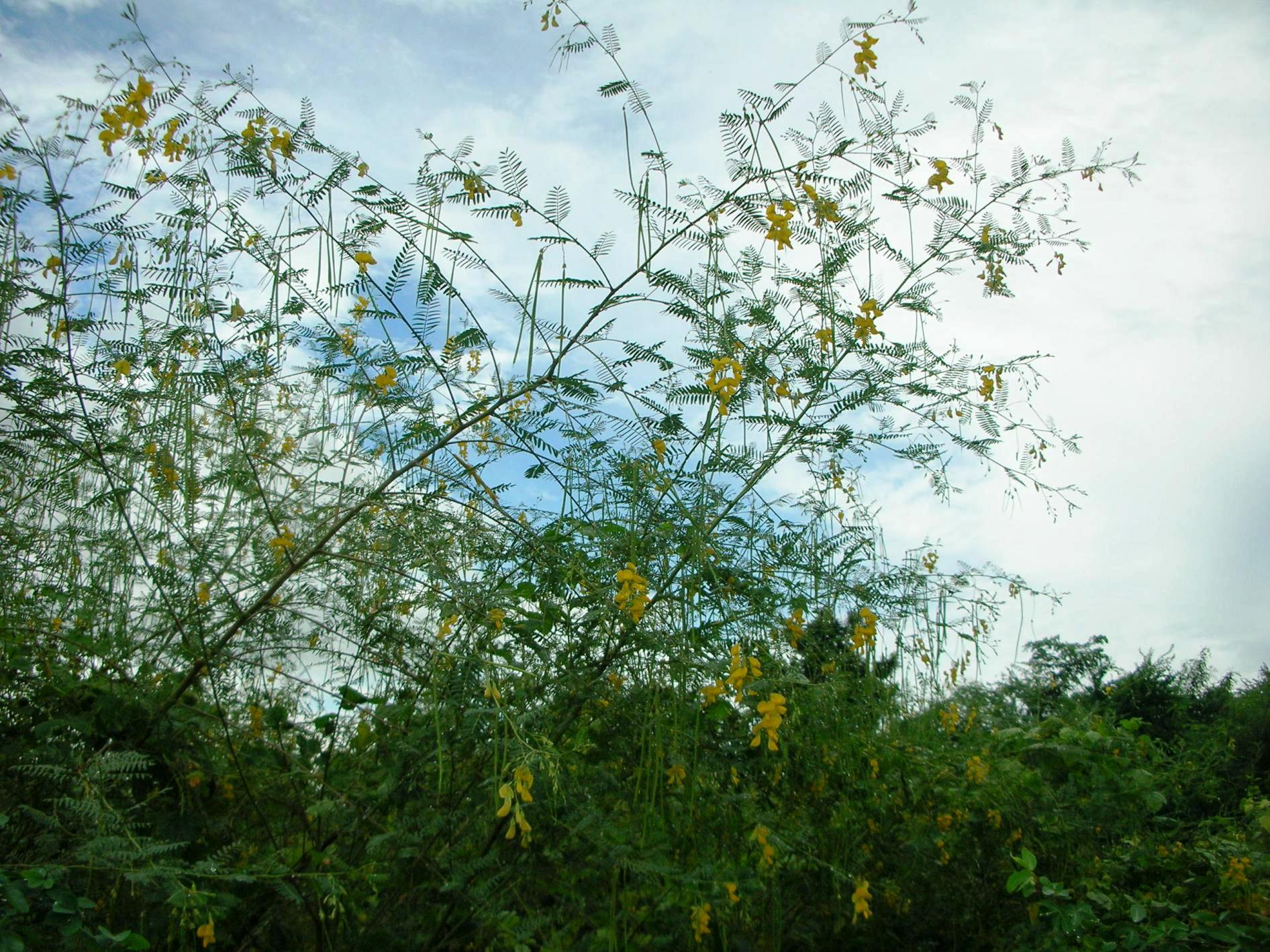
Bush by a canal

It is an annual shrub which can grow to seven metres in height but usually only reaches one to two metres. It sends out fibrous, pithy stems with long leaves and bears purple-spotted yellow flowers. It produces pods which contain light brown beans.

== Distribution and habitat ==
It is native to Asia and North Africa, is most common in tropical Africa where it grows as a common noxious weed, and has been introduced to the Americas. It can grow on saline soil.

S. bispinosa is adapted to wet, heavy soil but apparently adapts easily to drought-prone or sandy regions. It is cultivated widely in India and it is grown in rice paddies in Vietnam for use as firewood.

== Uses ==
The plant has a great number of uses, including as green manure, rice straw, wood and fodder.

- It can be used like industrial hemp for rope, fish nets, sackcloth and sailcloth. Its fibers are similar to those of birch trees and show promise as a source of paper fiber.
- The foliage makes a good fodder for livestock and the beans can be fed to fowl. The plant has been also used as a famine food by people.
- Natural gum from the plant is useful as a thickening agent.
- Like other legumes, it can be planted to improve the soil via nitrogen fixation.
- It makes a good firewood.

=== Culinary ===
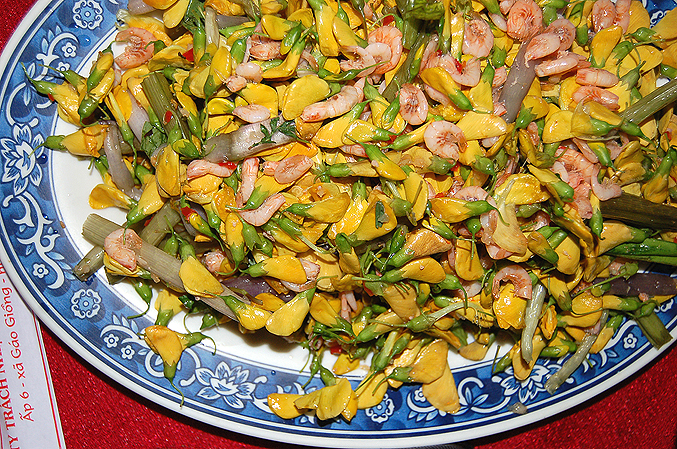
Gỏi tép đồng và bông điên điển, a Vietnamese dish using the flowers

The yellow flowers of S. aculeata are eaten as a vegetable in Southeast Asia. They are much smaller than the more popular white flowers of Sesbania grandiflora, but similar in shape. Still, they are appreciated as food in Thai and Vietnamese cuisine.

In the Thai language the flowers are called ดอกโสน (dok sanō). They are used in Thai cuisine both cooked and raw, they can also be used to make omelettes and sweets.

== In culture ==
The flower is the provincial flower of Phra Nakhon Si Ayutthaya Province, Thailand.

== See also ==
- Sesbania grandiflora
- Edible flower
