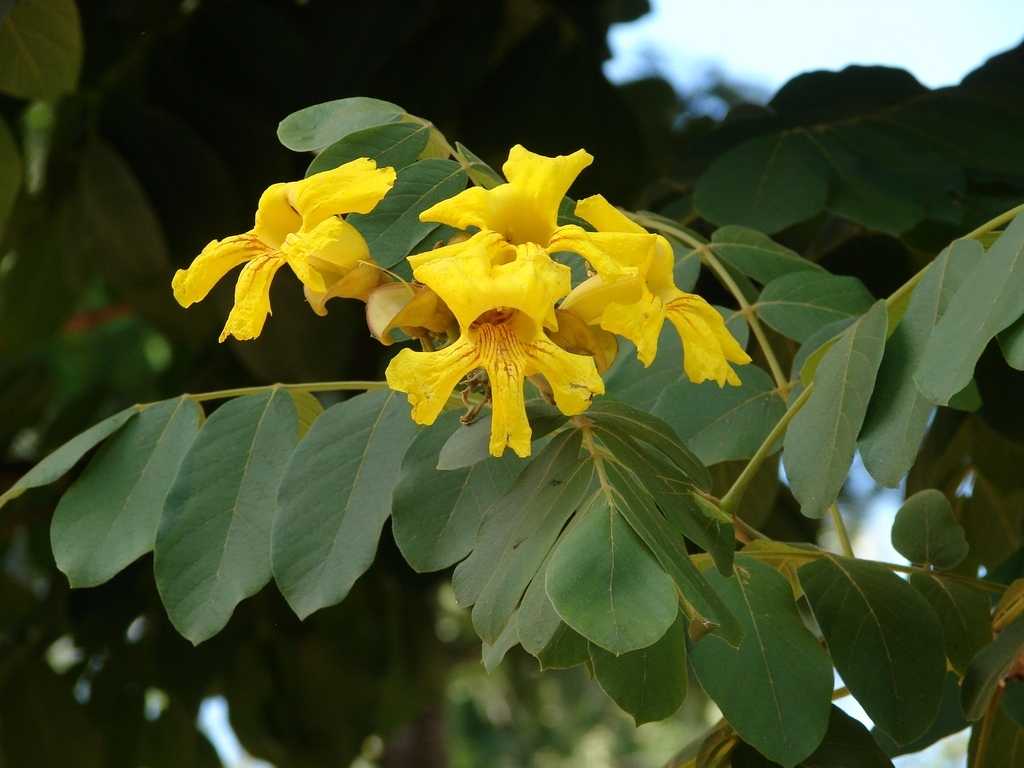
- Blossoms of Markhamia lutea

Conservation status
- Least Concern (IUCN 3.1)

Scientific classification
- Kingdom: Plantae
- Clade: Tracheophytes
- Clade: Angiosperms
- Clade: Eudicots
- Clade: Asterids
- Order: Lamiales
- Family: Bignoniaceae
- Genus: Markhamia
- Species: M. lutea

Binomial name
- Markhamia lutea (Benth.) K.Schum.

Synonyms
- Dolichandrone lutea Benth. ex Hook.; Dolichandrone platycalyx (Baker) Sprague.; Markhamia hildebrantii Sprague; Markhamia platycalyx Sprague; Spathodea lutea Benth.

= Markhamia lutea =

Species of tree

Markhamia lutea, the Nile tulip, Nile trumpet or siala tree is a tree species of the family Bignoniaceae, native to eastern Africa and cultivated for its large bright yellow flowers. It is related to the African tulip tree. Native to Africa, Markhamia was named in honour of Clements Markham (1830–1916), who worked in India. An evergreen small tree that grows to 4–5 m in height outside of native zones, although it can reach more than 10 m in its zones of origin. Leaves, of 20–30 cm in length, normally arranged in groups in the ends of the branches. Flowers in terminal clusters. They are trumpet shaped, yellow in colour, with orange-reddish spots in the throat. They measure 5–6 cm in length. Fruit is a capsule, of up to 70 cm in length, with abundant winged seeds. It is propagated by seeds.
