= Edible flower =

Flowers that may be consumed safely

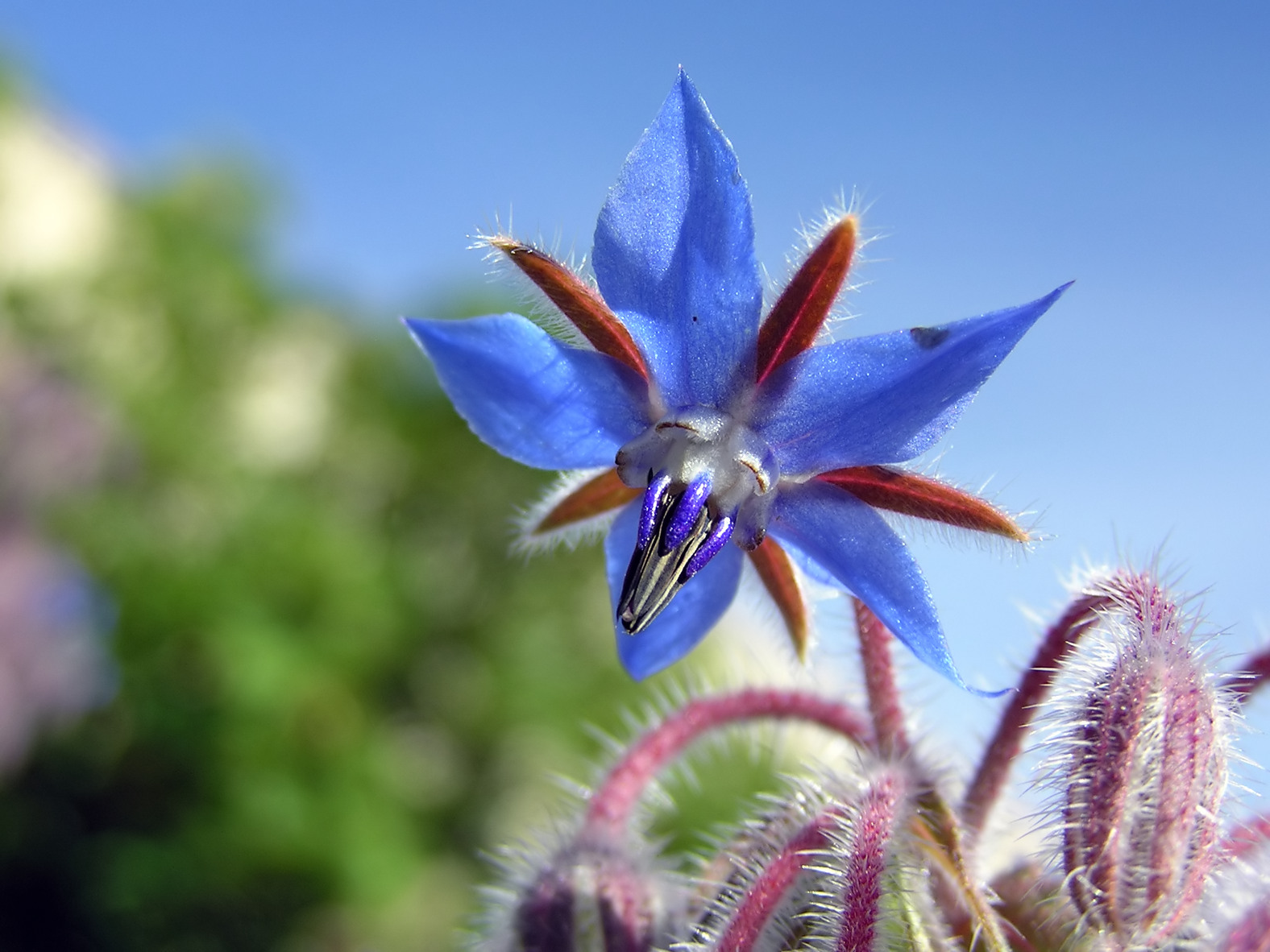
Blue borage is used as a sweet-flavored garnish.

A number of plant species have flowers that can be consumed safely, in some cases only in small portions or specific parts. Otherwise they may be poisonous.

Certain flowers may be eaten as vegetables, used to make drinks, or as a flavoring. Notable flower products include artichokes, broccoli, capers, and saffron. Flowers are part of many regional cuisines, especially those of Eurasia.

== Species ==
A number of foods are types of flowers or are derived from parts of flowers. Other parts of the plants mentioned in this list may be poisonous.

- American elderberry (Sambucus canadensis)
- Anise hyssop (Agastache foeniculum)
- Arugula (Eruca sativa)
- Artichoke (Cynara scolymus)
- Banana blossom
- Basil (Ocimum basilicum)
- Bean (Phaseolus vulgaris)
- Bergamot (Monarda didyma)
- Black locust – The flowers are used as tea, in pancakes and as fritters in Europe. Other parts are toxic.
- Broccoli (Brassica oleracea var. italica)
- Broussonetia kurzii
- Butterfly pea (Clitoria ternatea)
- Cauliflower (Brassica oleracea)
- Chamomile (Chamaemelum nobile)
- Chervil (Anthriscus cerefolium)
- Chinese hibiscus (Hibiscus rosa-sinensis)
- Chives (Allium schoenoprasum)
- Chicory (Cichorium intybus)
- Chickweed (Stellaria Media)
- Chrysanthemum (Chrysanthemum spp.)
- Cornflower (Centaurea cyanus)
- Cosmos spp.
- Dandelion (Taraxacum officinale)
- Dianthus (Dianthus spp.)
- Dill (Anethum graveolens)
- English marigold (Calendula officinalis)
- English daisy (Bellis perennis)
- Fennel (Foeniculum vulgare)
- Geranium (Pelargonium spp.)
- Hollyhock (Alcea rosea)
- Japanese honeysuckle (Lonicera japonica), toxic besides the flower
- Lavender (Lavandula spp.)
- Lilac (Syringa vulgaris)
- Lovage (Levisticum officinale)
- Maguey flower (Agave spp.)
- Mangrove trumpet tree (Dolichandrone spathacea)
- Markhamia stipulata, similar to the Mangrove trumpet tree flower
- Mint (Mentha spp.)
- Nasturtium (Tropaeolum majus)
- Okra (Abelmoschus esculentus)
- Passionflower (Passiflora spp.)
- Pineapple sage (Salvia elegans)
- Red clover (Trifolium pratense)
- Rose (Rosa spp.)
- Rosemary (Rosmarinus officinalis)
- Sage (Salvia officinalis)
- Sesbania grandiflora, popular in South and Southeast Asia
- Snapdragon (Antirrhinum majus)
- Squash (Cucurbita pepo)
- Sunflower (Helianthus annuus)
- Thyme (Thymus vulgaris)
- Violet (Viola odorata)

== Toxicity ==
Some flowers are safe to eat only in small amounts. Apple flowers (Malus spp.) contain cyanide precursors, and Johnny jump-ups (Viola tricolor) contain saponins. Borage (Borago officinalis) and daylily (Hemerocallis spp.) flowers are diuretics, and sweet woodruff (Galium odoratum) can have blood-thinning effects. The flowers of linden trees (Tilia spp.) are reportedly "safe in small amounts", but heavy consumption can cause heart damage. Marigolds (Tagetes spp.) can be harmful in large amounts, and only certain species have an appealing flavor.

Toxic flowers are easily mistaken for edible varieties, and unrelated safe and unsafe species may share a common name. Various non-toxic plants can cause severe allergies in some people. Flowers cultivated as ornamental plants for garden use are not intended for use as food.

== Uses ==
Flowers may be eaten as vegetables as a main part of a meal, used to make drinks, or as a flavoring herb. Artichokes, broccoli, and capers are all immature, unopened flower buds. The costly spice saffron consists of the stigmas and styles collected from the inside of a Crocus sativus flower. Flowers are part of many regional cuisines, including those of Asia, Europe, and the Middle East.

Edible flowers are added to foods to provide flavor, aroma, and decoration. They can be eaten as part of a main dish or be incorporated into salads or cakes. Flowers can be used to make beverages such as tisanes and wines or added to drinks as flavorings. They are added to spreads such as butter or fruit preserves, as well as to vinegar, marinades, and dressings.

Flowers are also consumed for sustenance. Many flowers that are technically edible can be far from palatable. An example of a species with flowers that are of high nutritional value is the dandelion, whose flowers are shown to contain high levels of polyphenols and antioxidants and possess anti-inflammatory and anti-angiogenic properties.

For the best flavor, flowers should be fresh and harvested early in the day. Wilted and faded flowers and the unopened buds of most species can be unpleasant and often bitter. The taste and color of nectar widely vary between different species of flower; consequently, honey may vary in color and taste depending on the species of flower. Many flowers can be eaten whole, but some have bitter parts, such as the stamens and stems.

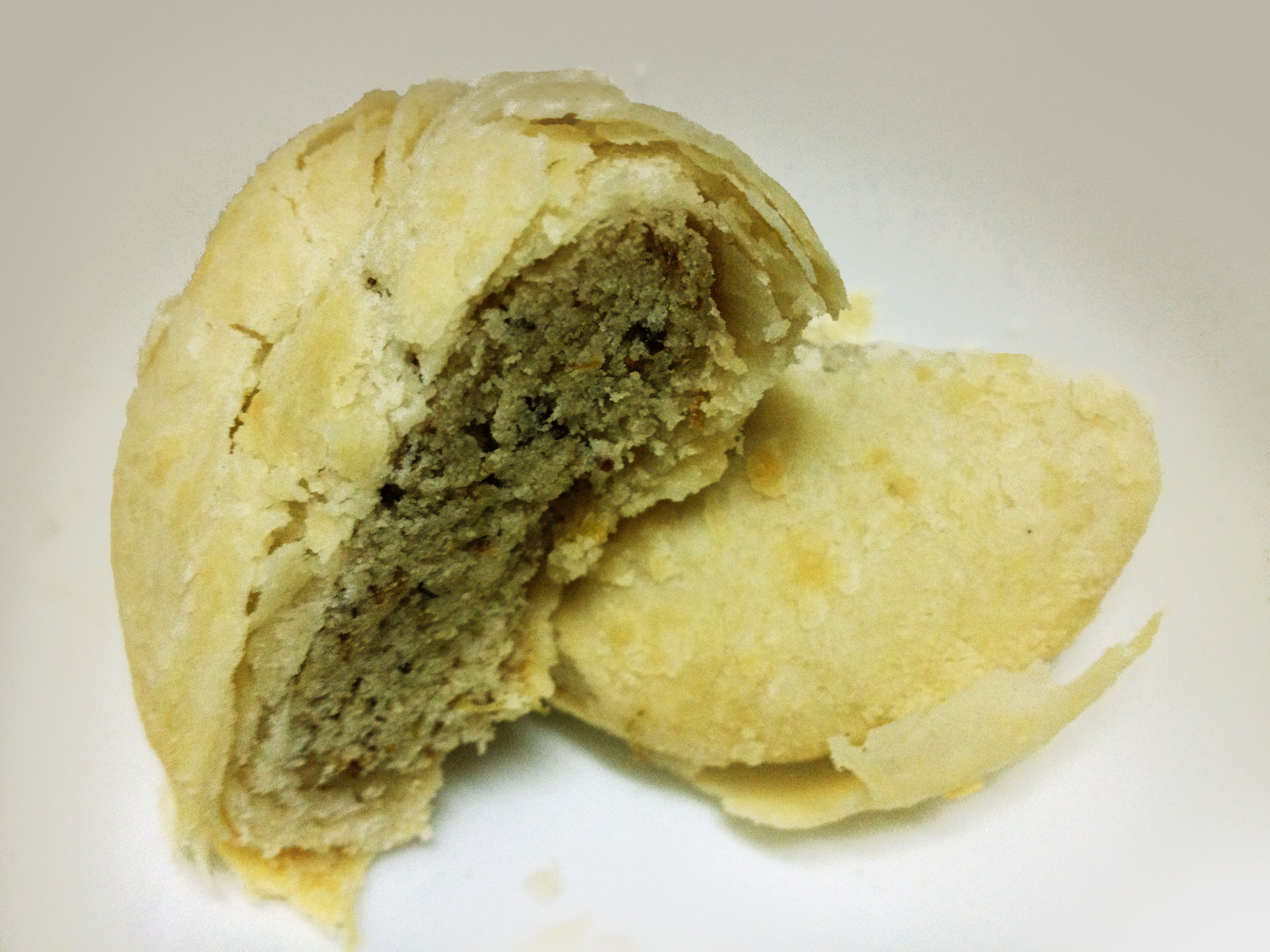
Chinese flower cakes (common filling include rose, jasmine, wisteria, among others)

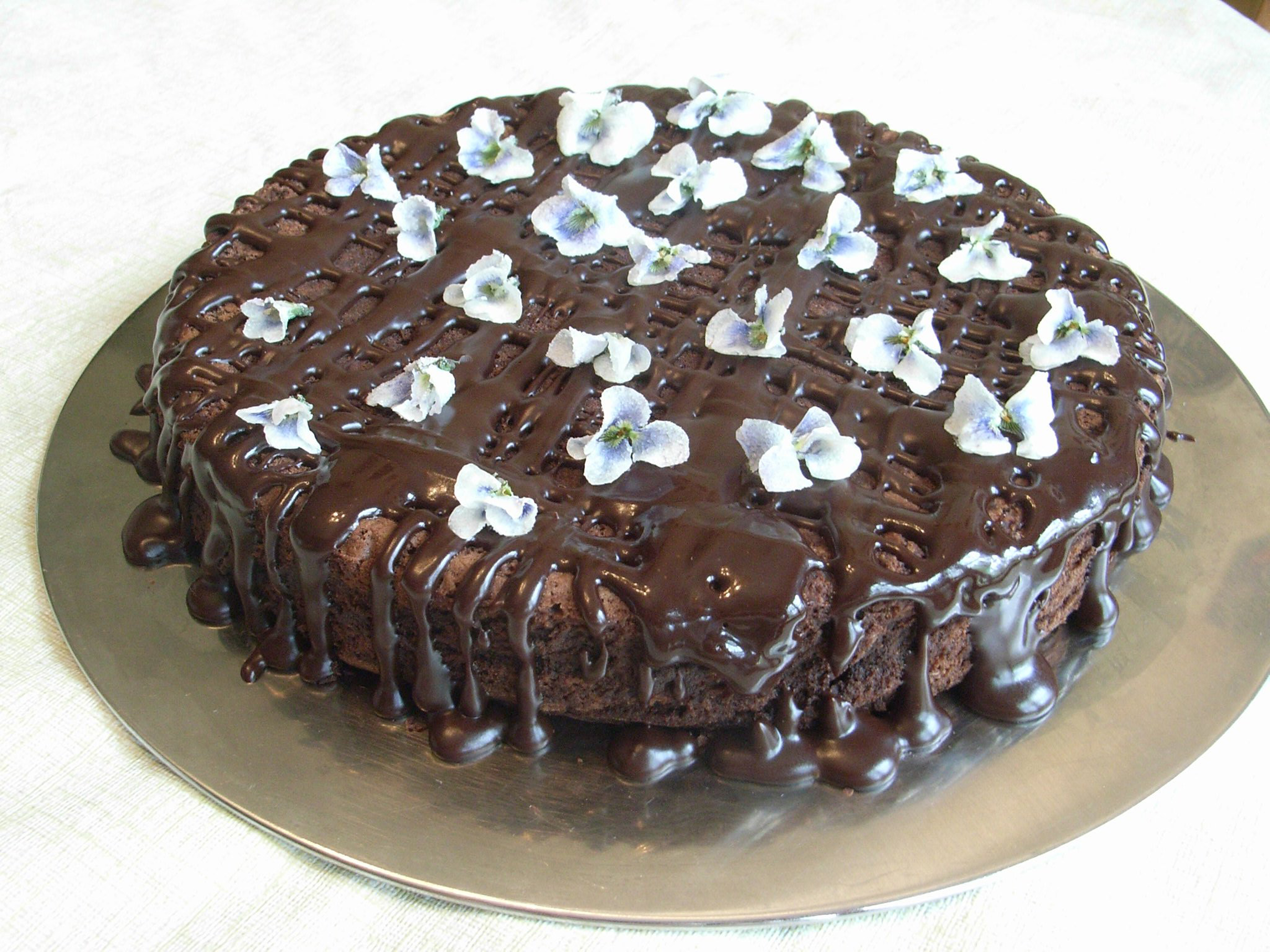
Chocolate cake with candied violets

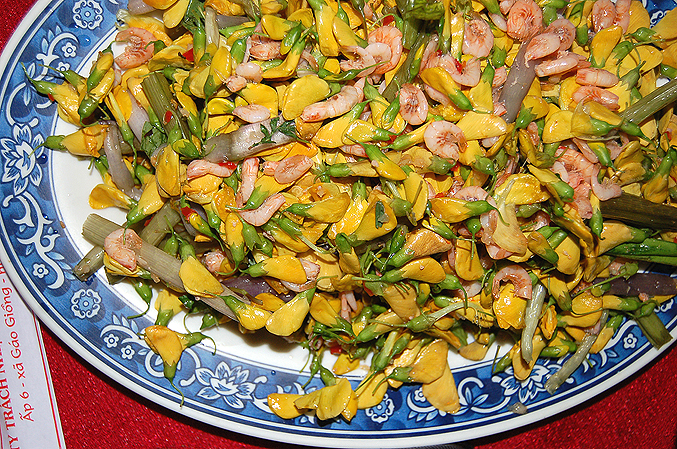
The Vietnamese dish gỏi bông điên điển và tép đồng with Sesbania bispinosa flowers

== Gallery ==
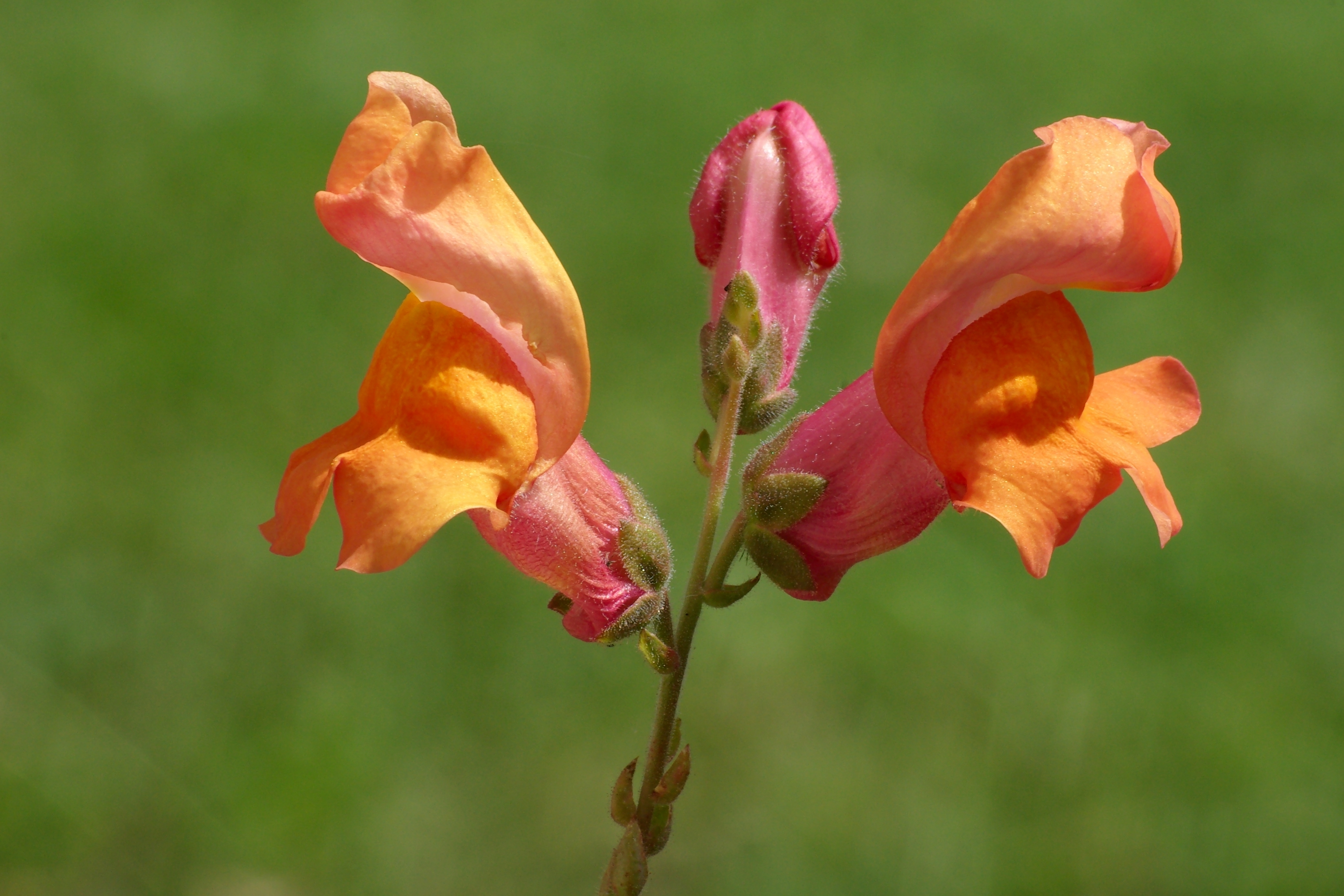
Antirrhinum majus (snapdragons)

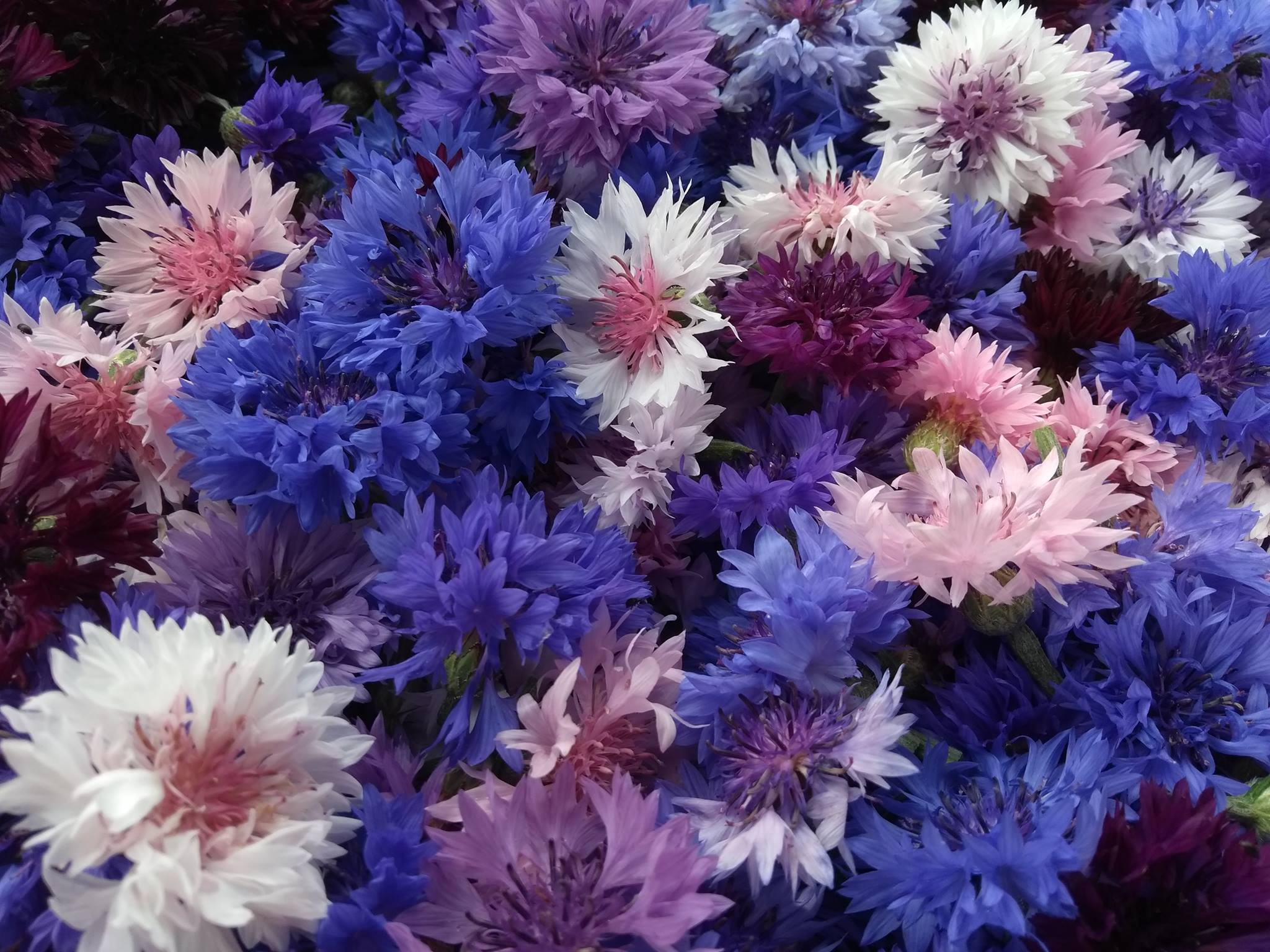
Centaurea cyanus (cornflower)

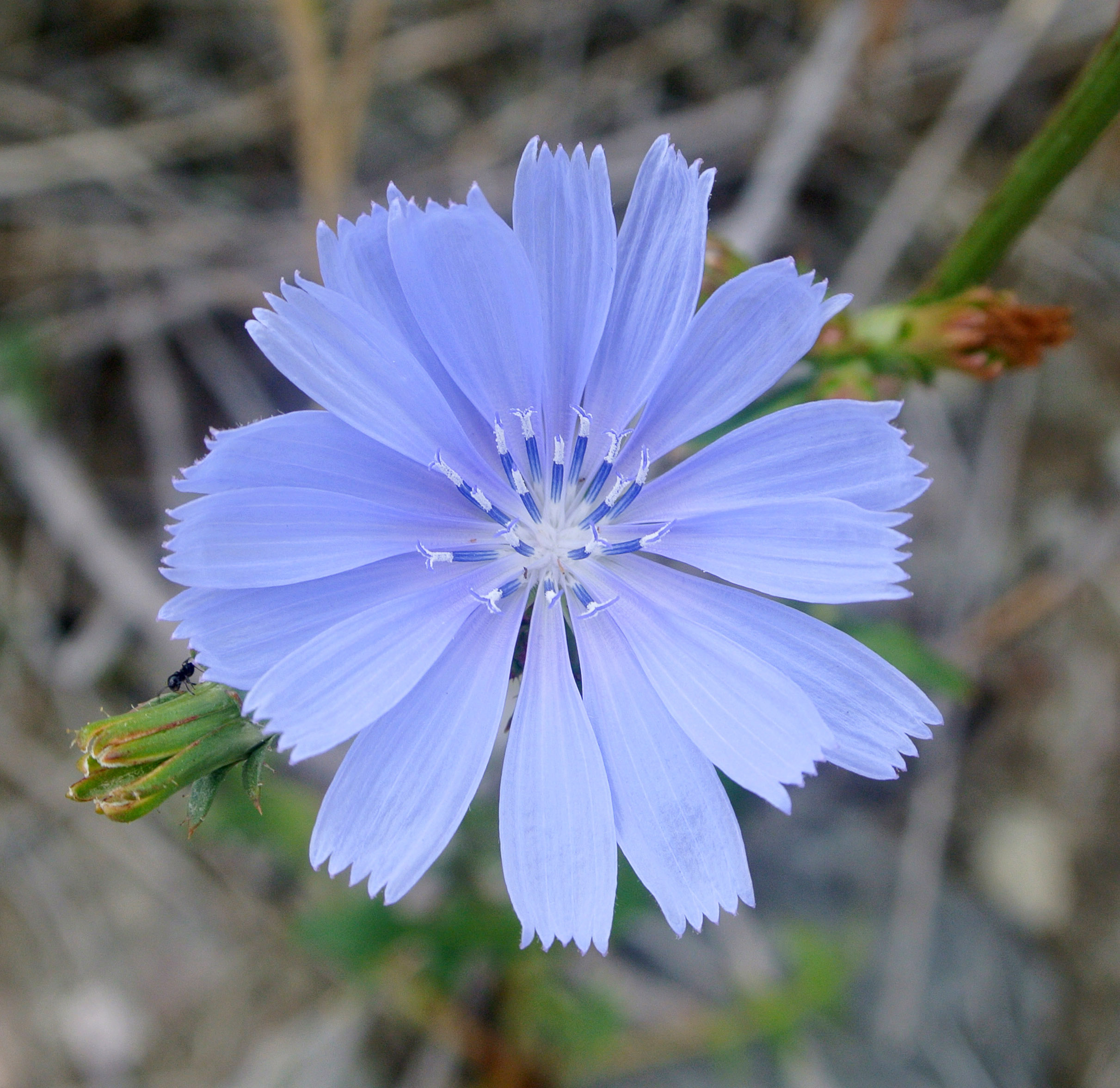
Cichorium intybus (chicory)

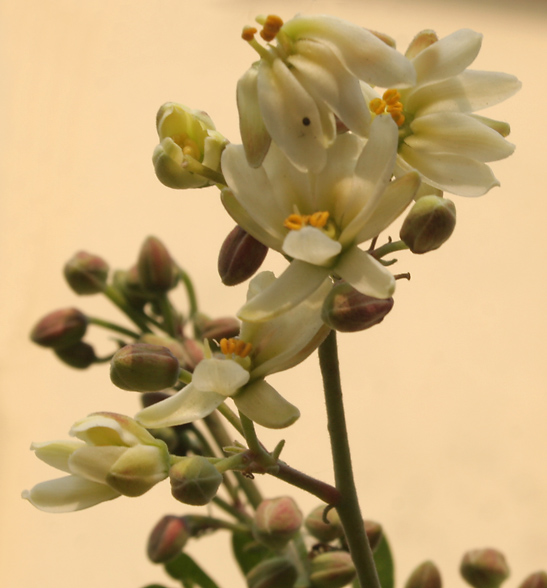
Moringa oleifera, popular on the Indian subcontinent

== See also ==
- Kitchen garden
- Hwajeon, a small sweet pancake made with edible flower petals
