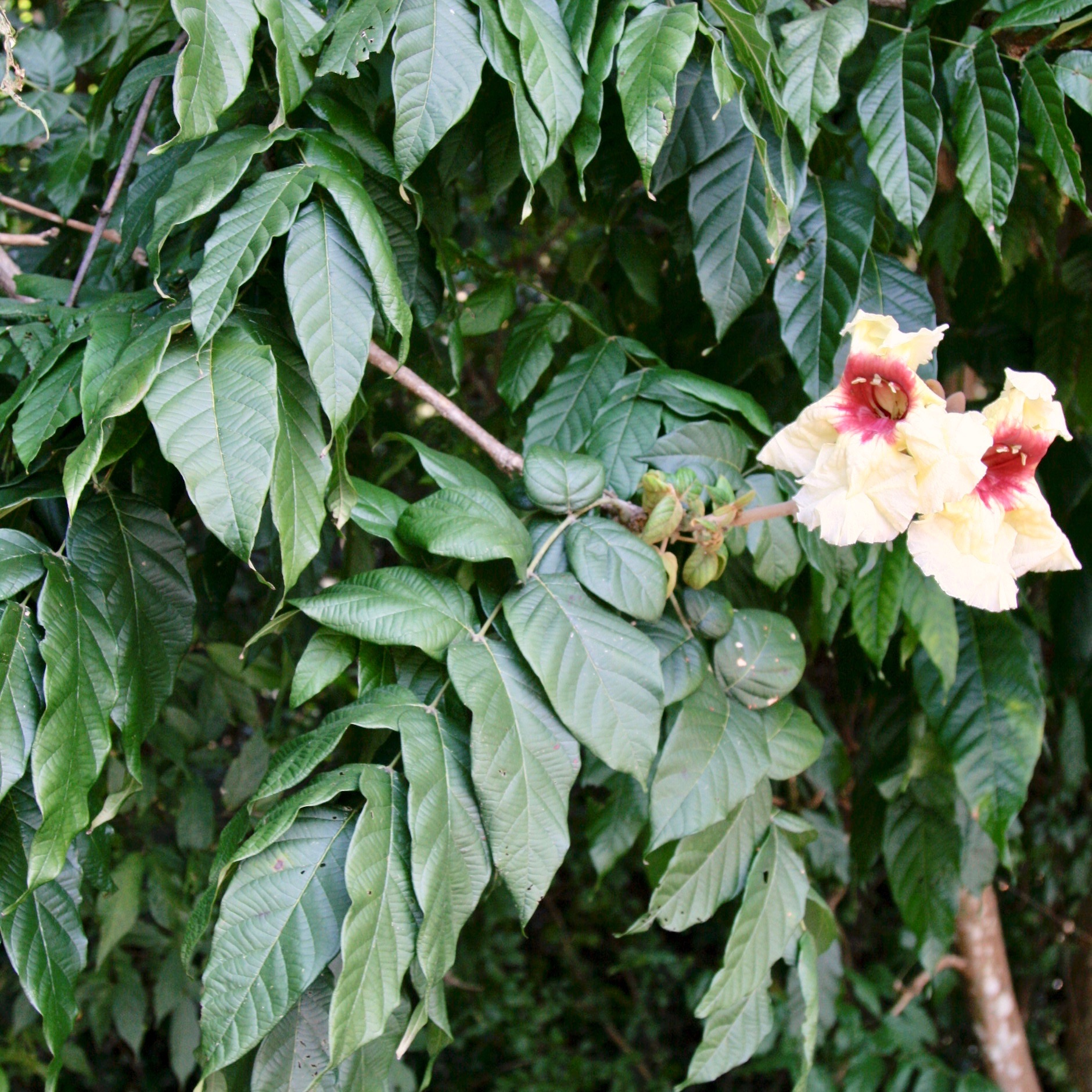
- In Hainan, China

Conservation status
- Least Concern (IUCN 3.1)

Scientific classification
- Kingdom: Plantae
- Clade: Tracheophytes
- Clade: Angiosperms
- Clade: Eudicots
- Clade: Asterids
- Order: Lamiales
- Family: Bignoniaceae
- Genus: Markhamia
- Species: M. stipulata

Binomial name
- Markhamia stipulata (Wall.) Seem.

Synonyms
- Bignonia stipulata (Wall.) Roxb.; Dolichandrone stipulata (Wall.) Seem. ex Gamble; Spathodea stipulata Wall.; Dolichandrone cauda-felina (Hance) Benth. & Hook.f. ex F.B.Forbes & Hemsl.; Markhamia cauda-felina (Hance) Craib; Markhamia pierrei Dop; Spathodea cauda-felina Hance; Spathodea velutina Kurz

= Markhamia stipulata =

Species of flowering plant

Markhamia stipulata (Thai: แคหัวหมู or แคป่า, khae hua mu or khae pa; Chinese: 西南猫尾木, pinyin: xī nán māo wěi mù, Vietnamese: cây đinh, 'Southwest-China cat tail tree') is a species of plant in the family Bignoniaceae.

== Description ==
This species usually grows as a medium-sized tree, reaching heights of 5–15 metres (16–49 ft). The flowers are pale yellow to reddish brown.

== Distribution and habitat ==
The species is native to South China and Southeast Asia. It thrives in sparsely treed areas, such as fields.

== Uses ==
The flower is edible and is part of both Lao cuisine and Thai cuisine, where it is known as dok khae hua mu or dok khae pa. The flowers are usually eaten sautéed or in kaeng som. The leaves are also used in traditional Thai medicine.

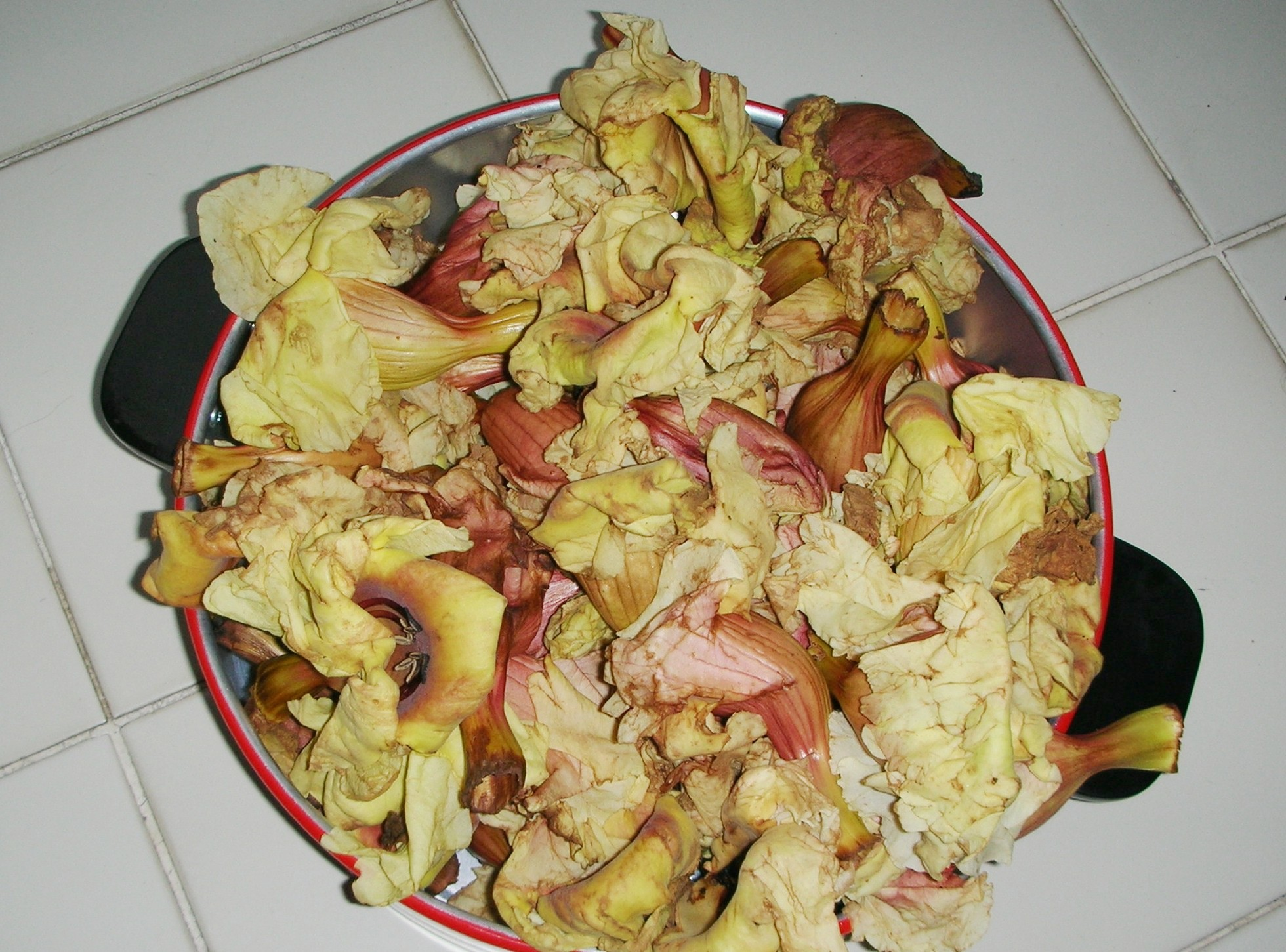
Khae pa flowers

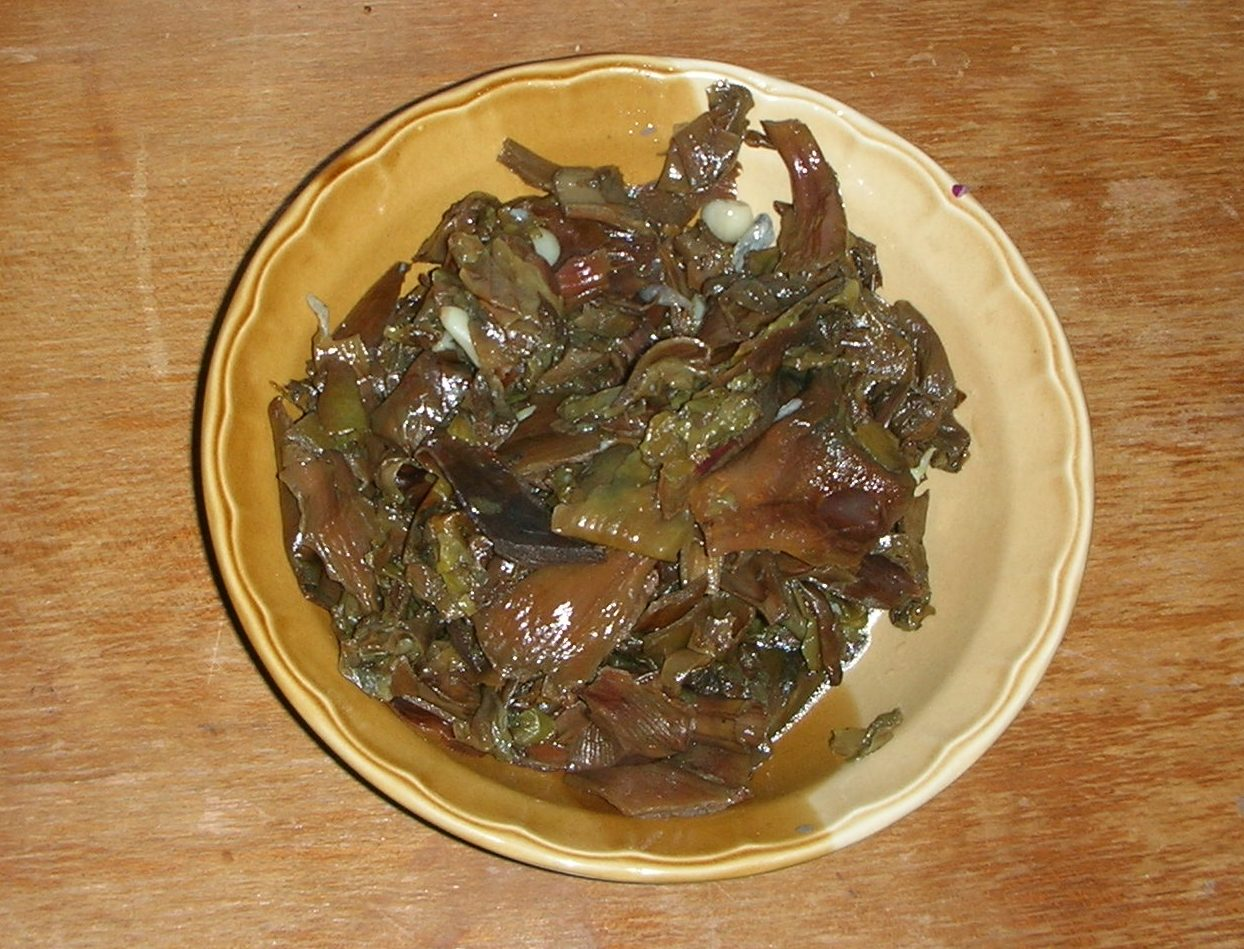
Sauteed khae pa flowers

== See also ==
- Sesbania grandiflora, known as ดอกแค dok khae in Thai
- List of Thai ingredients
