= Trumpetflower =

Trumpetflower or trumpet flower may refer to several plants:

- Chinese trumpet flower, Incarvillea, native to central and eastern Asia
- Evening trumpetflower, Gelsemium sempervirens, native to North America
- Indian trumpetflower, Oroxylum indicum, native to India
- Velvet trumpet flower, Salpiglossis sinuata, native to Chile
- Wavy trumpet flower, Dolichandrone atrovirens, native to India

== See also ==
- Angel's trumpet, plants with trumpet-like flowers
- Bugleweed
- Cat-claw trumpet, or cat's claw creeper, Dolichandra unguis-cati
- Desert trumpet, Eriogonum inflatum
- Devil's trumpet, Datura metel
- Flaming trumpet, Collomia rawsoniana
- Golden trumpet, Allamanda cathartica
- Mysore trumpet vine, Thunbergia mysorensis
- Orange trumpet, Pyrostegia venusta
- Pink trumpet vine
  - Podranea
  - Tecomanthe burungu
- Tiny trumpet, Collomia linearis
- Trumpet pitcher, Sarracenia
- Trumpet stylewort, Levenhookia leptantha
- Trumpet tree, several plants
- Trumpet weed:
  - Eutrochium fistulosum
  - Eutrochium purpureum
- Trumpet vine or trumpet creeper, Campsis
- Water trumpet, Cryptocoryne
