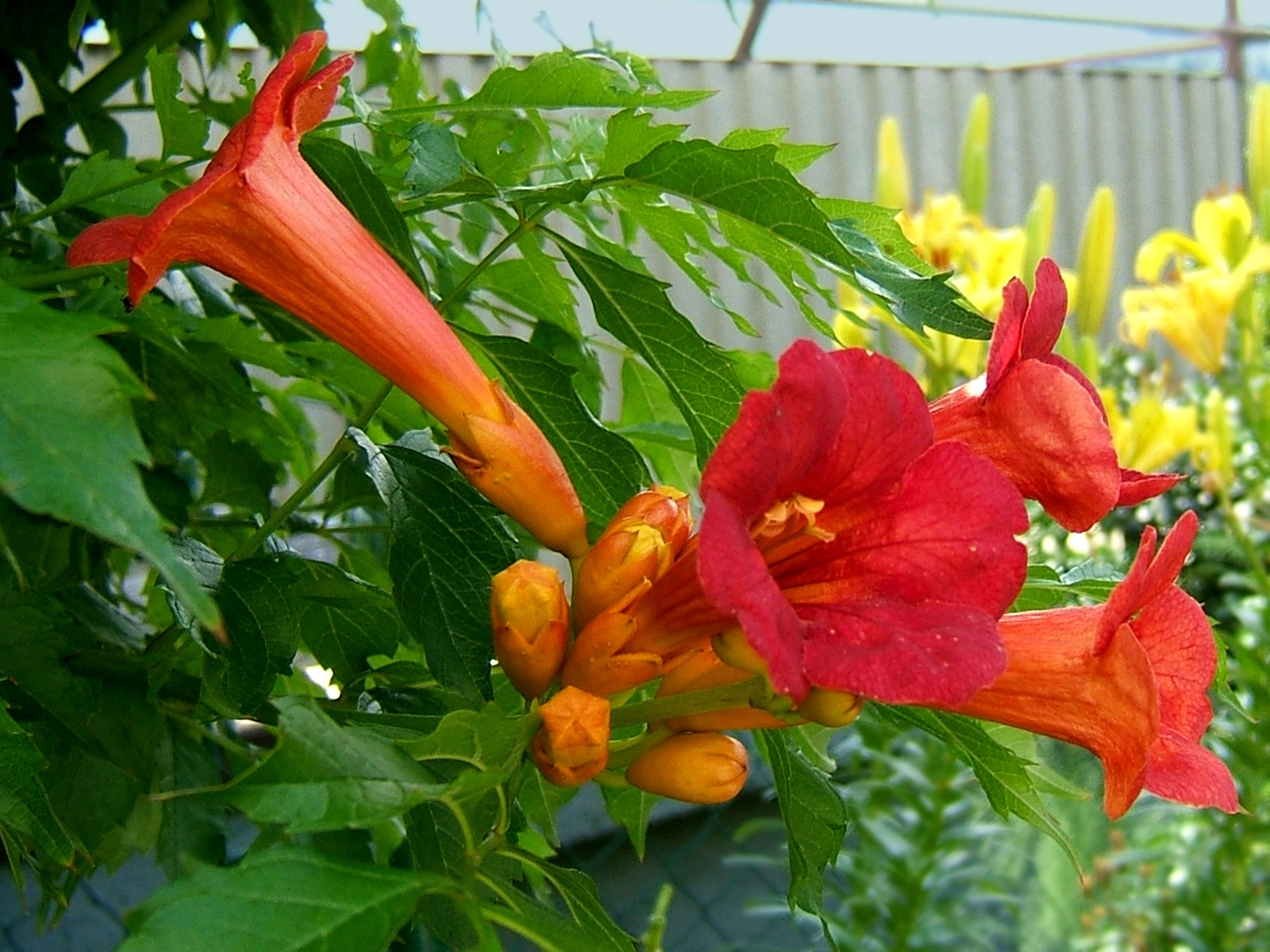

Scientific classification
- Kingdom: Plantae
- Clade: Tracheophytes
- Clade: Angiosperms
- Clade: Eudicots
- Clade: Asterids
- Order: Lamiales
- Family: Bignoniaceae
- Genus: Campsis
- Species: C. × tagliabuana

Binomial name
- Campsis × tagliabuana (Vis.) Rehder

= Campsis × tagliabuana =

Species of vine

Campsis × tagliabuana (Madame Galen) is a mid-19th-century hybrid between Campsis radicans (American trumpet vine) and Campsis grandiflora (Chinese trumpet vine). It produces trumpet-shaped, orange to red flowers up to 3 in (8 cm) long that appear in loose clusters of 6 to 12. It is a woody, clinging, perennial vine that attaches itself to structures and climbs vigorously with aerial roots like those of ivy. It bears dark-green deciduous leaves, 8–12 in (20–30 cm) long. Its flowers are very attractive to bees, butterflies and birds. Like its parents it is hardy but in cooler temperate regions requires the shelter of a sunny wall to produce its spectacular flowers in abundance.

The Latin specific epithet tagliabuana commemorates the 19th-century Italian nurserymen, Alberto Linneo and Carlo Ausonio Tagliabue.

It has gained the Royal Horticultural Society's Award of Garden Merit.
