= Trumpet tree =

Trumpet tree or trumpet bush may refer to:

- Several species of Cecropia, including:
  - Cecropia obtusifolia
  - Cecropia peltata
- Dolichandrone spathacea, mangrove trumpet tree
- The genus Handroanthus
- The genus Tabebuia, including:
  - Tabebuia aurea - "Caribbean trumpet tree" or silver trumpet tree, native to the South American mainland
  - Tabebuia heterophylla - pink trumpet tree, native to Caribbean islands
  - Tabebuia rosea - rosy trumpet tree

== See also ==
- Angel's trumpet, several plants
- Trumpetflower, several plants
- Campsis, trumpet vine or trumpet creeper
