= West Indian boxwood =

West Indian boxwood may refer to:

- Casearia praecox, a species of tree in the willow family, Salicaceae
- Tabebuia rosea, a species of tree in the trumpet vine family, Bignoniaceae
- Phyllostylon brasiliensis, a species of tree in the elm family, Ulmaceae
