= Edward Strieby Steele =

Botanist (1850–1942)

- Born: April 20, 1850; Farmingdale, Illinois, US
- Died: January 3, 1942 (aged 91); Glendale, California, US
- Education: Oberlin College
- Scientific career
- Fields: Botany
- Author abbrev. (botany): E.S.Steele

Edward Strieby Steele (1850–1942) was an American botanist.

Steele graduated from Oberlin College with a bachelor's degree in 1872 and a seminary degree in 1877. In 1889 he went to Washington, D.C., to work for the editorial staff of the Century Dictionary and Cyclopedia. In Washington, D.C., on 28 January 1891 he married Grace Avery King (1848–1932). Mr. and Mrs. Steele were botanical co-collectors for many years. Edward S. Steele worked for the U.S. federal government for twenty-seven years in "various capacities including a botanical clerk for the U.S. Department of Agriculture as well as an editorial assistant for the United States National Museum, Division of Plants, 1912–1918, and an assistant botanist." He moved to Los Angeles in 1932 when his wife died. He and his niece, Helen Steele Pratt (1883–1965), were botanical co-collectors in Southern California and sent about 350 botanical specimens to the Oberlin herbarium.

Helen S. Pratt graduated from Oberlin College with an A.B. in 1906. She was a naturalist and nature teacher, credited as the main person responsible for California's adoption of the California quail as the state bird. Edward S. Steele's father, James Steele, was involved in helping the Amistad captives return to Africa.

== Eponyms ==
- Eutrochium steelei – discovered in 1990 by Eric E. Lamont and named in honor of Edward S. Steele
