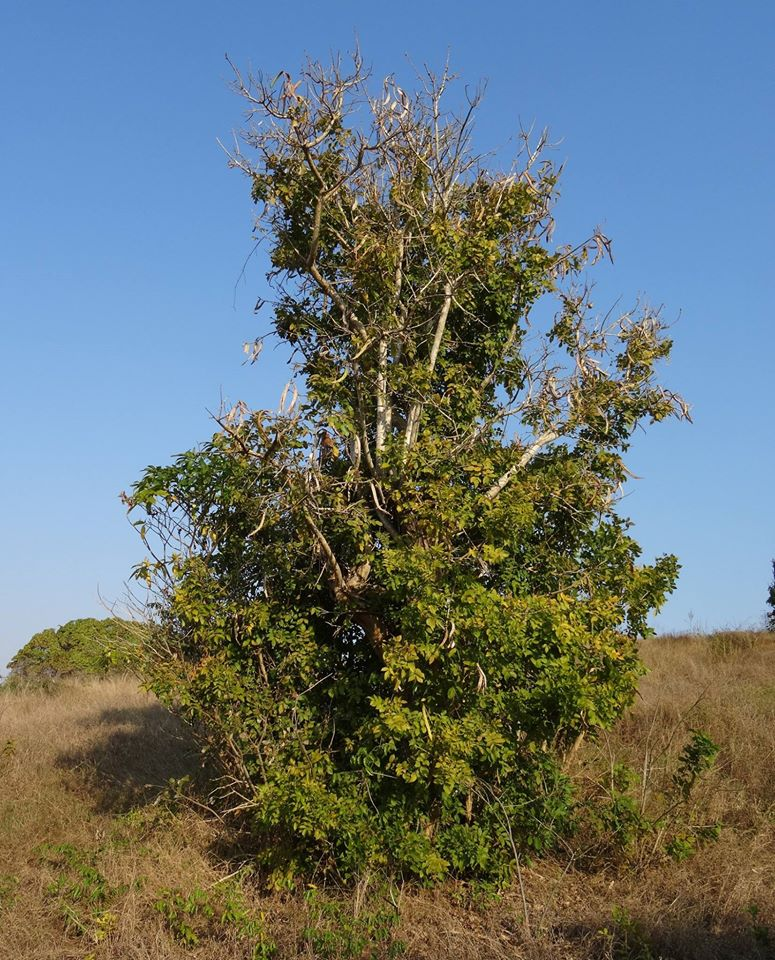
- Habit

Scientific classification
- Kingdom: Plantae
- Clade: Tracheophytes
- Clade: Angiosperms
- Clade: Eudicots
- Clade: Asterids
- Order: Lamiales
- Family: Bignoniaceae
- Genus: Dolichandrone
- Species: D. alba

Binomial name
- Dolichandrone alba (Sim) Sprague

Synonyms
- Spathodea alba Sim (1909)

= Dolichandrone alba =

Species of flowering plant

Dolichandrone alba, also known as indani or tsanie, is a small deciduous shrub or small tree in the family Bignoniaceae. It is endemic to southern Mozambique.

== Description ==
This species may reach heights of 3–12 m. The flowers are white, and it is commonly found in sandy soils within coastal environments.

== Gallery ==
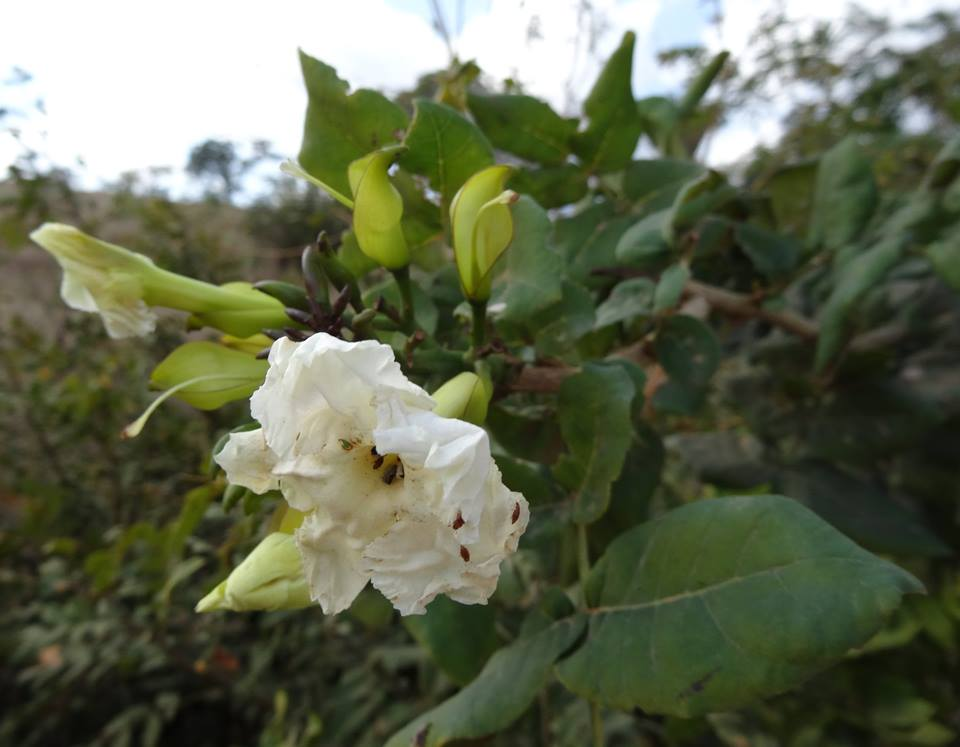
Open flower

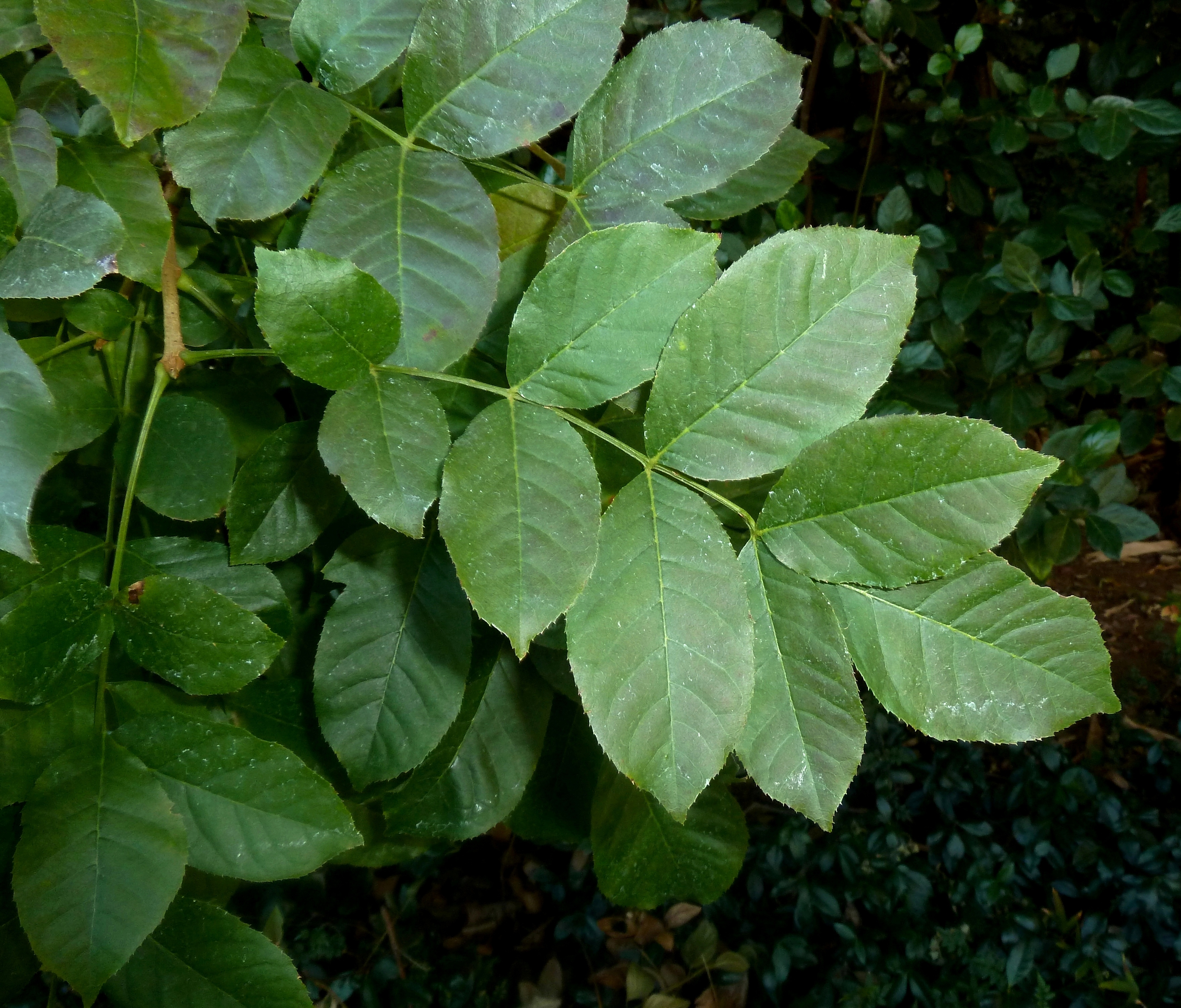
Leaf

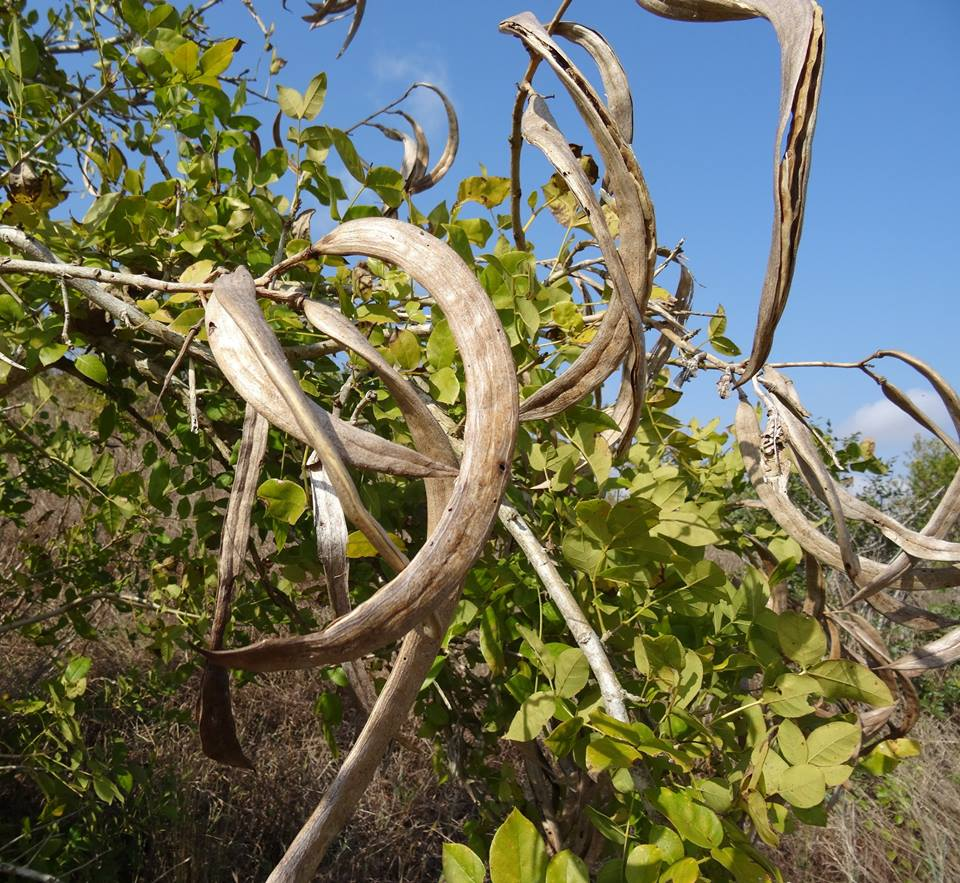
Fruit capsules
