= Dolichandrone arcuata =

Scientific classification
- Kingdom: Plantae
- Clade: Tracheophytes
- Clade: Angiosperms
- Clade: Eudicots
- Clade: Asterids
- Order: Lamiales
- Family: Bignoniaceae
- Genus: Dolichandrone
- Species: D. arcuata

Binomial name
- Dolichandrone arcuata (Wight) C.B.Clarke

Synonyms
- Spathodea arcuata Wight.

Species of flowering plant

Dolichandrone arcuata, known in Malayalam as pambukaimaram, is a deciduous tree in the Bignoniaceae family. This species is native to the dry, deciduous forests of the Eastern Ghats in the Indian subcontinent. It is a medium-sized tree, reaching up to 16 m (52 ft) in height.

== Description ==
Dolichandrone arcuata has compound leaves which are imparipinnate, the rachis is 7–20 cm (2.8–7.9 in) long, slender and tomentose. They have 5-11 leaflets and the petiolule is up to 5–30 mm (0.20–1.18 in) long; is slender and tomentose. This species produces flowers in October, which are bisexual, white, trumpet shaped, few in terminal corymbs or panicles; split on one side and recurved to 2.5 cm (0.98 in). Fruit is a capsule shape, 2 valved, up to 1.5 cm × 1.5 cm (0.59 in × 0.59 in), linear, terete, pubescent, speckled with white dots and is curved. The seeds are 0.6 mm (0.024 in) long and winged.
