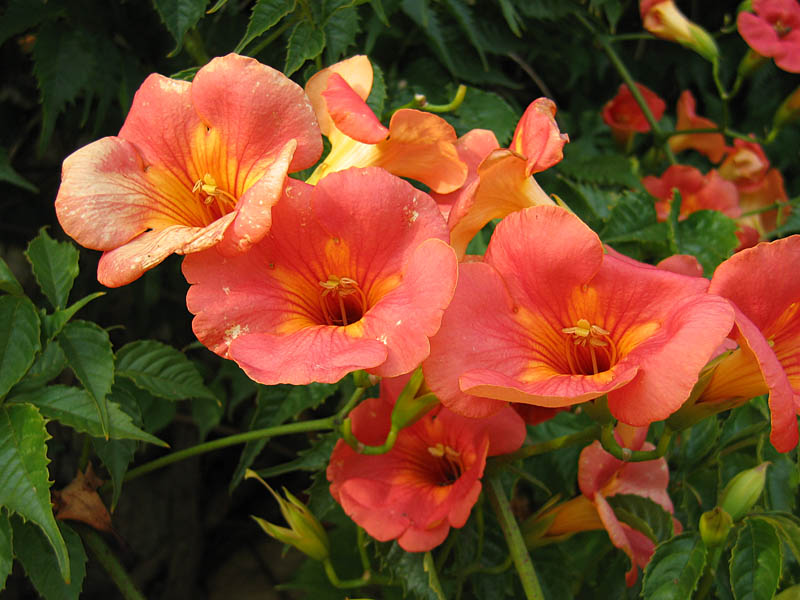
- Campsis grandiflora 'Morning Calm'

Scientific classification
- Kingdom: Plantae
- Clade: Tracheophytes
- Clade: Angiosperms
- Clade: Eudicots
- Clade: Asterids
- Order: Lamiales
- Family: Bignoniaceae
- Genus: Campsis
- Species: C. grandiflora

Binomial name
- Campsis grandiflora (Thunb.) K.Schum.

Synonyms
- Bignonia chinensis Lam.; Bignonia grandiflora Thunb.; Campsis adrepens Lour.; Campsis chinensis (Lam.) Voss; Gelseminum grandiflorum (Thunb.) Kuntze; Incarvillea chinensis Spreng. ex DC. nom. illeg.; Incarvillea grandiflora Poir.; Tecoma chinensis (Lam.) K.Koch; Tecoma grandiflora (Thunb.) Loisel.; Tecoma sinensis Spach

= Campsis grandiflora =

Species of vine

Campsis grandiflora, commonly known as the Chinese trumpet vine, is a fast-growing, deciduous creeper with large, orange, trumpet-shaped flowers in summer. It can grow to a height of 10 meters. A native of East Asia, it is less hardy than its relative Campsis radicans.

Campsis grandiflora prefers moist, nutrient-rich soil and a position with full sun and support to climb. The dark green leaves have serrated edges.

== Name ==
The scientific Latin generic name campsis is derived from the Greek verb kampe - to bend, to bend and is given by the shape of the curved stamen filaments.

The specific epithet grandiflora is formed from the roots of the Latin words grandis - large, large and flos (in Gen. Pad. floris) - flower, or from the stem of the verb floreo - to bloom.

== Botanical description ==
The shoots are woody vines that reach 6-10 meters in length. They attach to vertical surfaces with the help of sparsely spaced aerial roots that grow into porous materials - the bark of supporting trees, stone, building bricks, etc.

The leaves are 4–13 cm long, compound imparipinnate with 7–9 leaflets. Petioles of leaflets 5(-10) mm, shape from oval-ovate to oval-lanceolate, 3-6(-9) x 1.5-3(-5) cm. Surface smooth, base broadly wedge-shaped, edge serrated, tip extended pointed. The venation is palmate, 6-7 secondary veins on each side of the central one. The plant is deciduous. Inflorescences are short panicles at the ends of shoots. The inflorescence axis is 15–20 cm long. The calyx is bell-shaped, about 3 cm, dissected to half its height. The lobes are lanceolate, about 1.5 cm.

The corolla is red outside and orange-red inside, about 5 cm long, the limb lobes are rounded. The flowering period is May–August with the first most active wave of flowering at the beginning of the period and the sporadic appearance of individual inflorescences later.

The stamens are shorter than the limb of the petals, the filaments are 2–2.5 cm long, the stamens are perpendicular to the filaments, yellow. The pistil is linear, about 3 cm, the stigma is compressed, divided into two lobes.

The fruit is a capsule-pod, rounded end, 7-12 cm long.

The seeds are flat with two membranous wings.

Number of chromosomes 2n=36, 38, 40.
