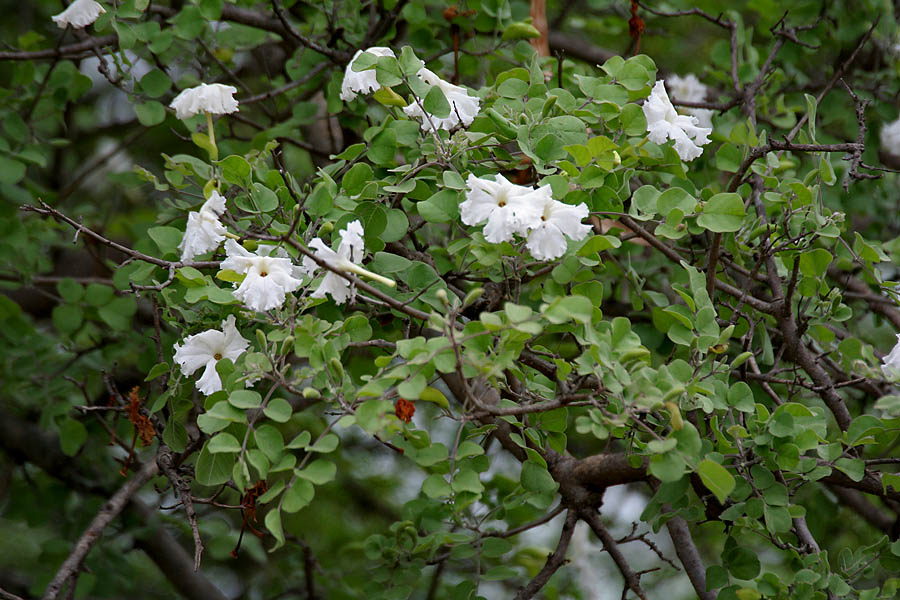
- Dolichandrone falcata

Scientific classification
- Kingdom: Plantae
- Clade: Tracheophytes
- Clade: Angiosperms
- Clade: Eudicots
- Clade: Asterids
- Order: Lamiales
- Family: Bignoniaceae
- Clade: Crescentiina
- Clade: Paleotropical clade
- Genus: Dolichandrone (Fenzl) Seem.

Species
- See text

= Dolichandrone =

Genus of flowering plants

Dolichandrone is a genus of flowering plants Palaeotropical clade in the family Bignoniaceae; species have been recorded from tropical and subtropical Asia to Australia and the W. Pacific, with D. alba found in Mozambique.

== Species ==
Plants of the World Online includes:

1. Dolichandrone alba (Sim) Sprague
2. Dolichandrone alternifolia (R.Br.) Seem.
3. Dolichandrone arcuata (Wight) C.B.Clarke
4. Dolichandrone atrovirens (Roth) K.Schum.
5. Dolichandrone columnaris Santisuk
6. Dolichandrone falcata (Wall. ex DC.) Seem.
7. Dolichandrone filiformis (DC.) Fenzl ex F.Muell.
8. Dolichandrone heterophylla (R.Br.) F.Muell.
9. Dolichandrone occidentalis Jackes
10. Dolichandrone serrulata (Wall. ex DC.) Seem.
11. Dolichandrone spathacea (L.f.) Seem.
