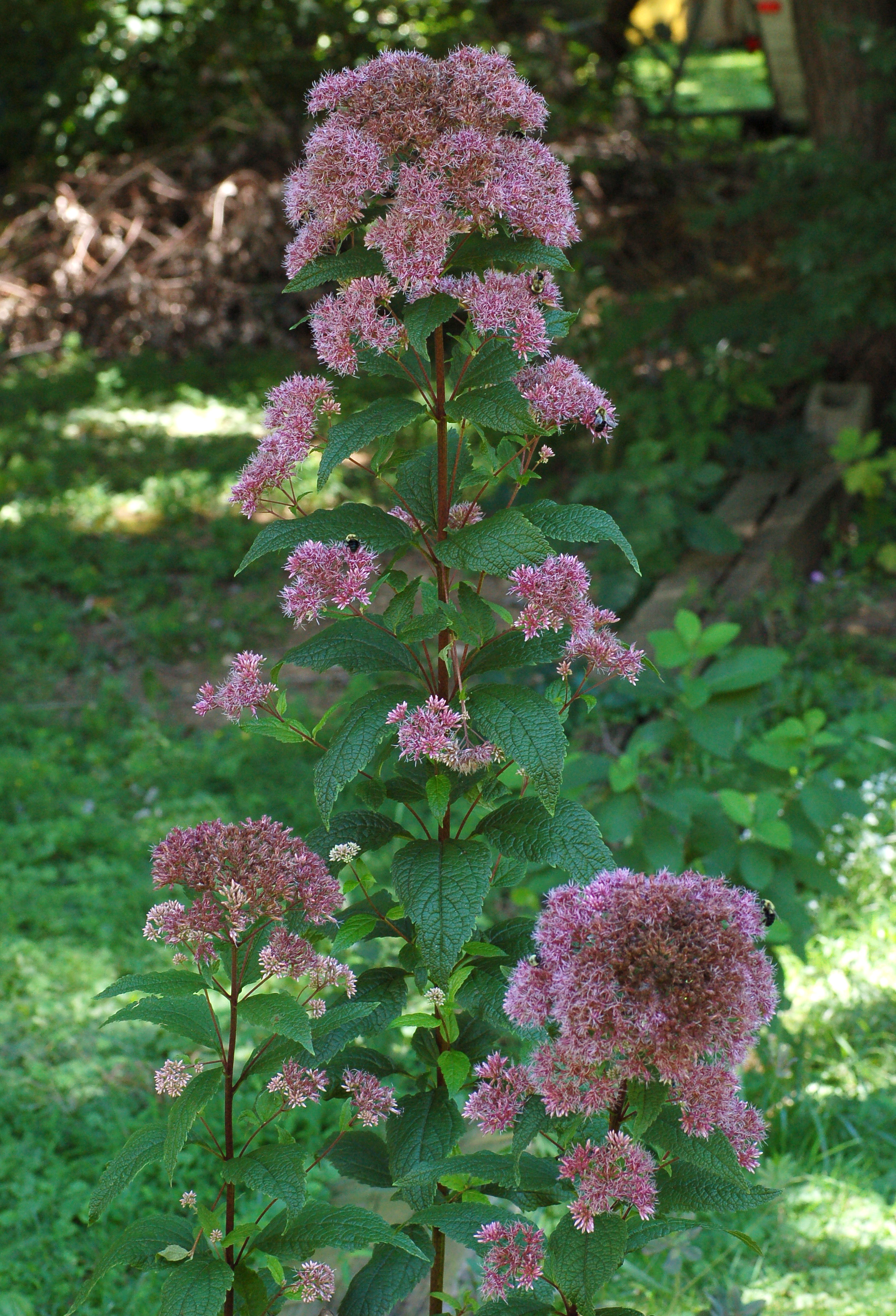

Scientific classification
- Kingdom: Plantae
- Clade: Tracheophytes
- Clade: Angiosperms
- Clade: Eudicots
- Clade: Asterids
- Order: Asterales
- Family: Asteraceae
- Genus: Eutrochium
- Species: E. dubium

Binomial name
- Eutrochium dubium (Willd. ex Poir.) E.E.Lamont

Synonyms
- Eupatoriadelphus dubius (Willd. ex Poir.) R.M. King & H. Rob.; Eupatorium dubium Willd. ex Poir.

= Eutrochium dubium =

Species of flowering plant

Eutrochium dubium, also called coastal plain joe pye weed, is a North American flowering plant in the family Asteraceae. It is native to the eastern United States and Canada, primarily the Atlantic coastal plain from Georgia to Nova Scotia.

Eutrochium dubium is a herbaceous perennial plant herb sometimes as much as 170 cm (68 inches or 5 2/3 feet) tall. Stems are sometimes purple, sometimes green with purple spots. The plant produces numerous flower heads in flat-topped arrays, each head has 4-10 dark purple (rarely pink or white) disc florets but no ray florets. The flowers are attractive to birds.

Eutrochium dubium prefers full sun to part shade. It will grow in a variety of soil types, provided the soil does not dry out.
