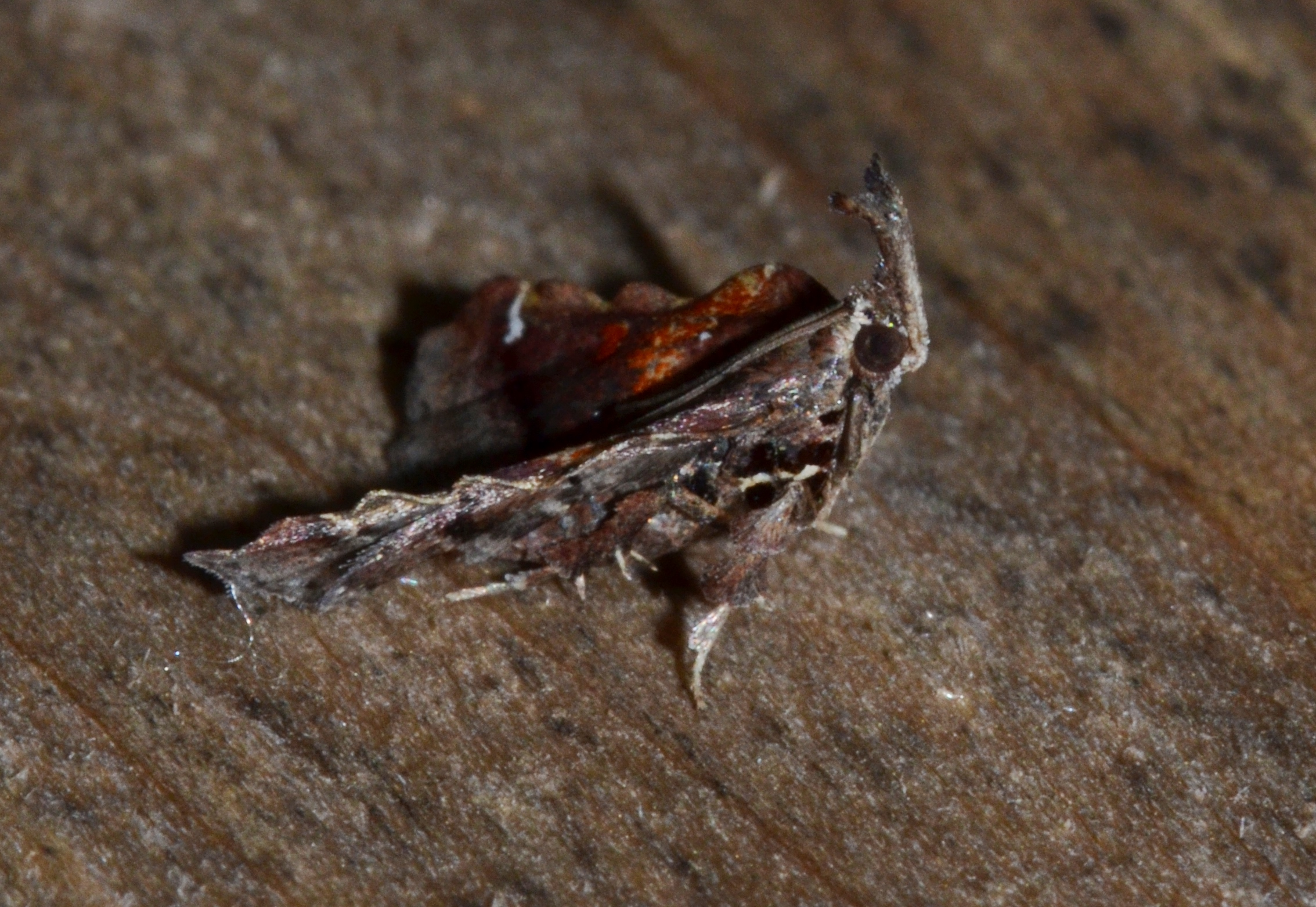
- Clydonopteron sacculana - trumpet vine ,oth

Scientific classification
- Kingdom: Animalia
- Phylum: Arthropoda
- Class: Insecta
- Order: Lepidoptera
- Family: Pyralidae
- Subfamily: Chrysauginae
- Genus: Clydonopteron; Riley, 1880

Type species
- *Clydonopteron tecomae Riley, 1880

= Clydonopteron =

Genus of moths

Clydonopteron is a genus of snout moths. It was described by Norman Denbigh Riley in 1880.

== Species ==
As of December 2025, two species were accepted:

- Clydonopteron pomponius H. Druce, 1895
- Clydonopteron sacculana (Bosc, 1800), syn. Clydonopteron tecomae Bosc, 1800
