= Clydonopteron pomponius =

Scientific classification
- Domain: Eukaryota
- Kingdom: Animalia
- Phylum: Arthropoda
- Class: Insecta
- Order: Lepidoptera
- Family: Pyralidae
- Genus: Clydonopteron
- Species: C. pomponius

Binomial name
- Clydonopteron pomponius H. Druce, 1895

Species of moth

Clydonopteron pomponius is a species of snout moth. It was described by Herbert Druce in 1895. It is found in Mexico and Guatemala.
