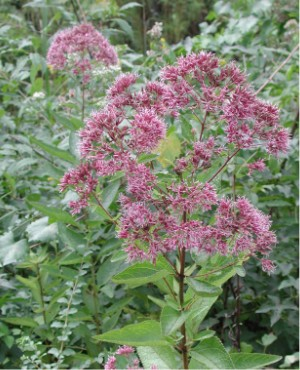
- Joe-Pye weed in flower
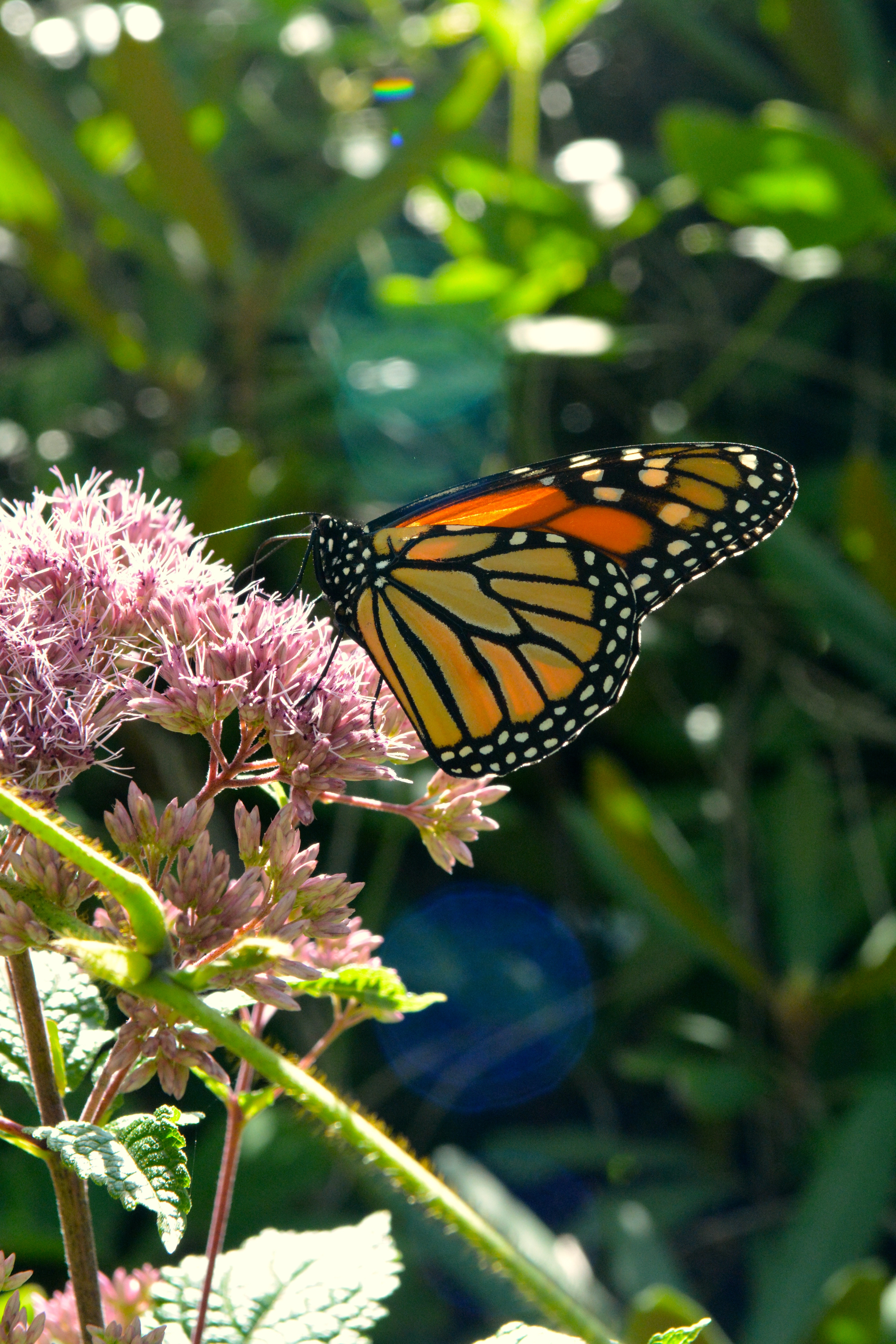

Scientific classification
- Kingdom: Plantae
- Clade: Embryophytes
- Clade: Tracheophytes
- Clade: Spermatophytes
- Clade: Angiosperms
- Clade: Eudicots
- Clade: Asterids
- Order: Asterales
- Family: Asteraceae
- Subfamily: Asteroideae
- Tribe: Eupatorieae
- Genus: Eutrochium; Raf.

Synonyms
- Eupatoriadelphus R.M.King & H.Rob.; Solidago subgenus Euthamia Nutt.; Eupatorium sect. Verticillatum DC.

= Eutrochium =

Joe-Pye weeds

Genus of flowering plants

Eutrochium is a North American genus of herbaceous flowering plants in the family Asteraceae. They are commonly referred to as Joe-Pye weeds. They are native to the United States and Canada, and have non-dissected foliage and pigmented flowers. The genus includes all the purple-flowering North American species of the genus Eupatorium as traditionally defined, and most are grown as ornamental plants, particularly in Europe and North America.

== Taxonomy ==
Eupatorium has recently undergone some revision and has been broken up into smaller genera. Joe Pye weeds were initially included in the genus Eupatorium, but as early as the 19th century Franco-American botanist Constantine Samuel Rafinesque proposed separating them into their own genus Eutrochium. (Note: Or as Eupatorium sect. Verticillatum by de Candolle in 1836.) Unaware of this, research botanists Robert M. King and Harold Robinson proposed assigning them to a new genus Eupatoriadelphus in 1970. This was widely accepted, and Joe Pye weeds began to be referred to as such.

In 1987, Robinson and King reincluded the genus Eupatoriadelphus in Eupatorium, while recognizing this former genus as being the same group of plants as Rafinesque's Eutrochium. This decision was also widely accepted.

Based on chloroplast DNA analysis published by Edward E, Schilling et al. in 1999, the Joe Pye weeds were again separated into their own genus, Eutrochium, as Eutrochium is the senior synonym of Eupatoriadelphus. This usage quickly became formalized.

Eupatorium in the revised sense (about 42 species of white-flowered plants from the temperate Northern Hemisphere) is apparently a close relative of Eutrochium. In addition to flower color, another difference between Eutrochium and Eupatorium is that the former has mostly whorled leaves and the latter mostly opposite ones. Eupatorium and Eutrochium are both placed in the subtribe Eupatoriinae, but South American plants which have sometimes been placed in that subtribe, such as Stomatanthes, seem to belong elsewhere in the tribe Eupatorieae.

Species

- Eutrochium dubium (Willdenow ex Poiret) E. E. Lamont – coastal plain Joe-Pye weed
- Eutrochium fistulosum (Barratt) E. E. Lamont – hollow Joe-Pye weed
- Eutrochium maculatum (Linnaeus) E. E. Lamont – spotted Joe-Pye weed
- Eutrochium purpureum (Linnaeus) E. E. Lamont – sweet Joe-Pye weed, green-stemmed Joe-Pye weed, queen of the meadow, gravel root, kidney root, purple boneset
- Eutrochium steelei (E. E. Lamont) E. E. Lamont

== Uses ==
All of the Joe Pye weed species except E. steelei are widely cultivated as ornamental landscape plants. Cultivars have been developed for a more compact habit (e.g. E. dubium ‘Little Joe’, E. dubium ‘Baby Joe’, E. maculatum ‘Little Red’) and varied flower color.

Joe Pye weeds have traditionally been ascribed with medicinal powers. A peer-reviewed study suggests that Joe Pye was a Mohican sachem named Schauquethqueat who lived in the mission town of Stockbridge, Massachusetts from c. 1740 to c. 1785 and who took as his Christian name, Joseph Pye. Sources (although without citation) claim the plant was used to treat typhus outbreaks and for the treatment of kidney stones and other urinary tract ailments.

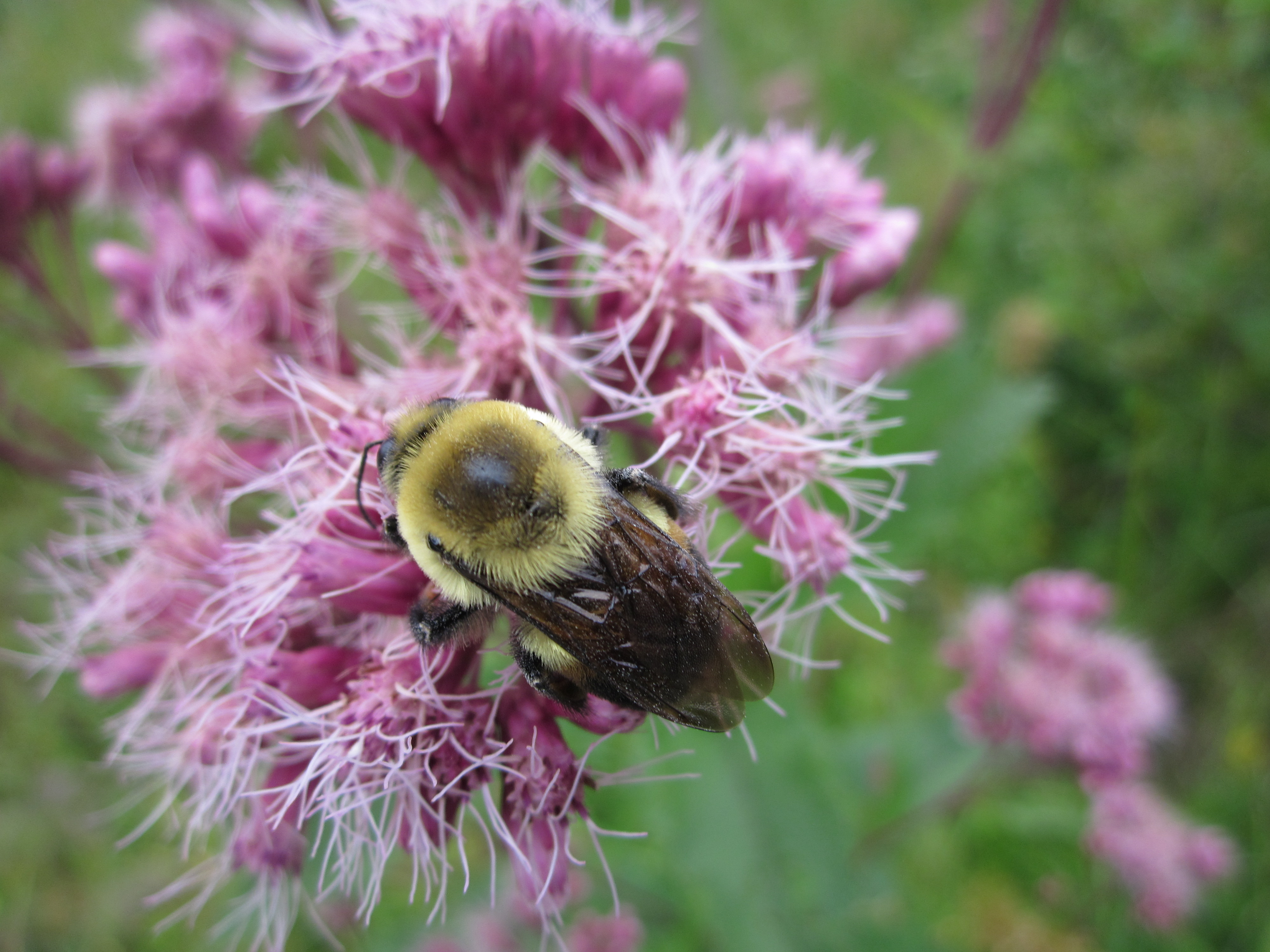
Bumblebee pollinating Joe-Pye weed

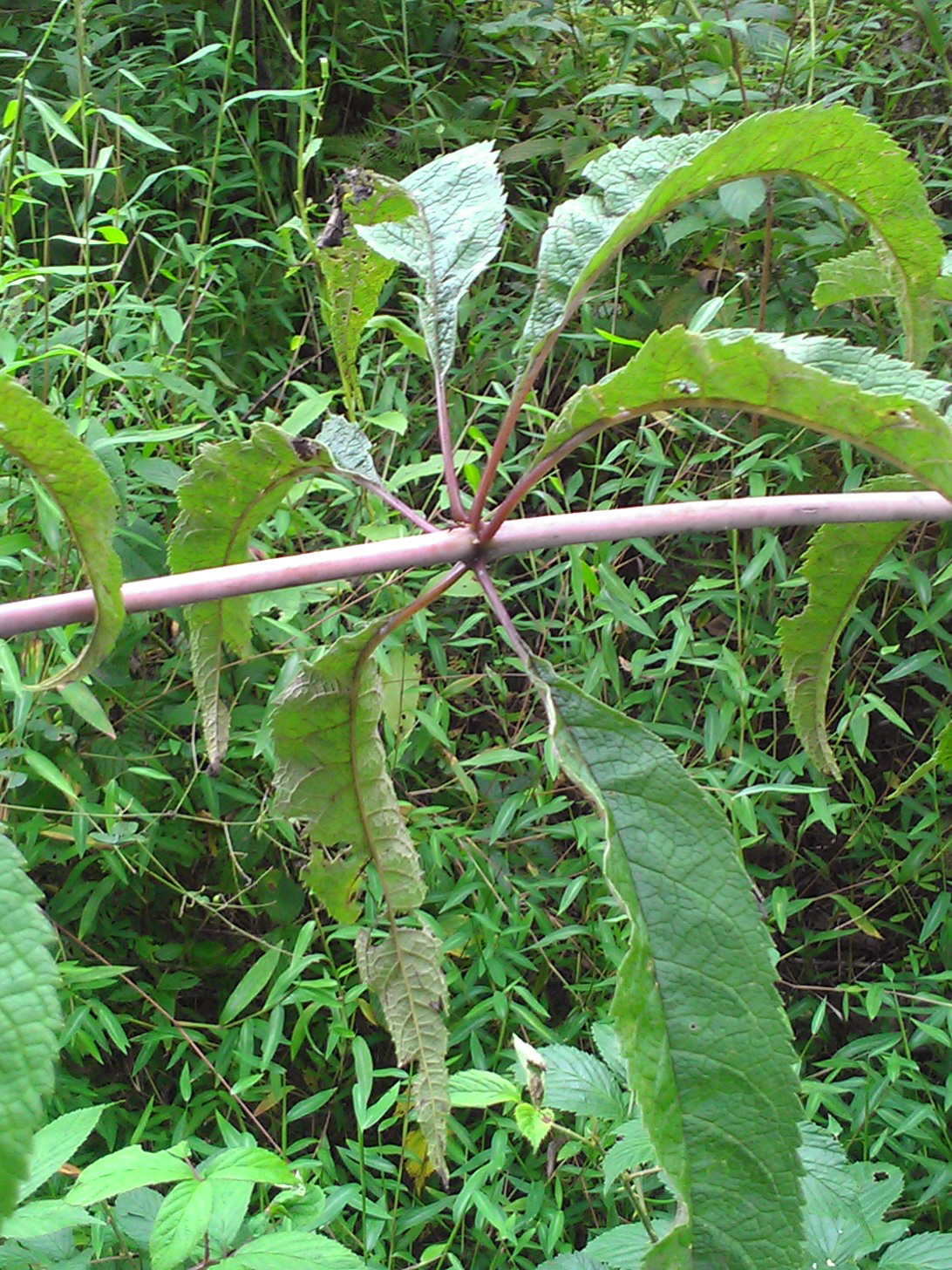
Whorled leaves of a Joe Pye Weed. Pisgah National Forest, North Carolina, September 2012
