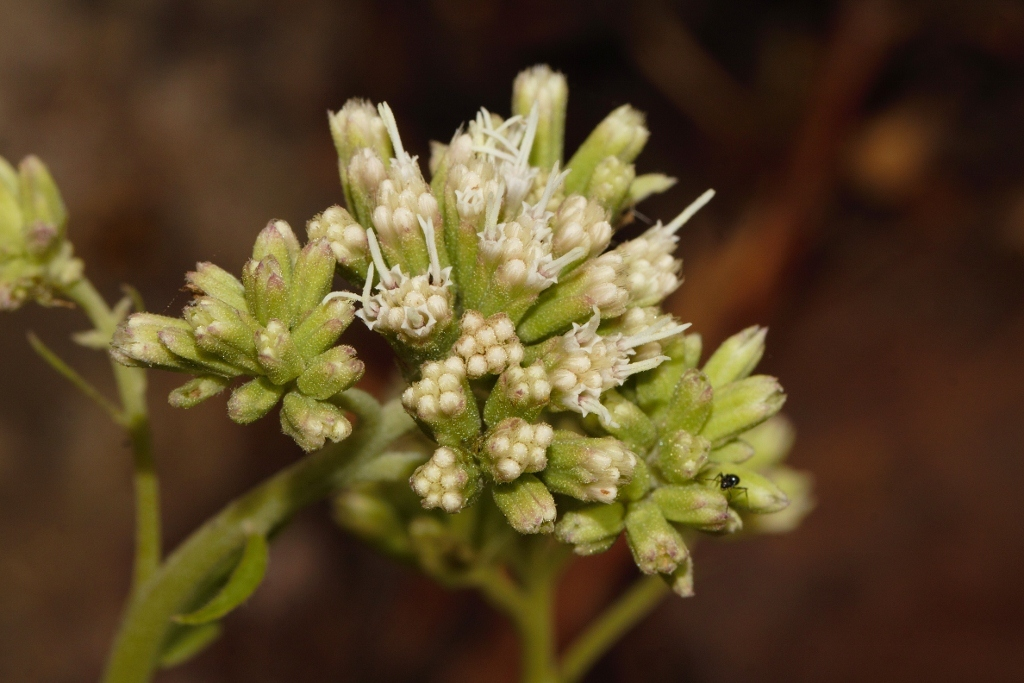
- Stomatanthes africanus in Zimbabwe

Scientific classification
- Kingdom: Plantae
- Clade: Tracheophytes
- Clade: Angiosperms
- Clade: Eudicots
- Clade: Asterids
- Order: Asterales
- Family: Asteraceae
- Subfamily: Asteroideae
- Tribe: Eupatorieae
- Genus: Stomatanthes; R.M.King & H.Rob.

Type species
- Eupatorium africanum Oliv. & Hieron.

= Stomatanthes =

Genus of plants

Stomatanthes is a genus of African and South American plants in the tribe Eupatorieae within the family Asteraceae.

== Classification ==
Although Stomatanthes is classified in the subtribe Eupatoriinae in the influential 1987 classification of King and Robinson, subsequent research shows that it belongs elsewhere in the tribe Eupatorieae, as it is not closely related to Eupatorium or Eutrochium.

Species

- Stomatanthes africanus (Oliv. & Hiern) R.M.King & H.Rob. - central + southern Africa
- Stomatanthes corumbensis (B.L.Rob.) H.Rob. - Brazil (Minas Gerais, Mato Grosso, Goiás)
- Stomatanthes dentatus (Gardner) H.Rob. - Bolivia, Brazil (Minas Gerais, Mato Grosso, Goiás, São Paulo)
- Stomatanthes dictyophyllus (DC.) R.M.King & H.Rob. - Brazil (Minas Gerais, Mato Grosso, Goiás, São Paulo)
- Stomatanthes helenae (Buscal. & Muschl.) Lisowski - central Africa
- Stomatanthes hirsutus H.Rob. - Brazilia Distrito Federal
- Stomatanthes loefgrenii (B.L.Rob.) H.Rob. - São Paulo
- Stomatanthes meyeri R.M.King & H.Rob. - Ethiopia
- Stomatanthes oblongifolius (Sch.Bip. ex Baker) H.Rob. - Uruguay, Brazil (Rio Grande do Sul, Santa Catarina, Paraná, Minas Gerais, São Paulo)
- Stomatanthes pernambucensis (B.L.Rob.) H.Rob. - Brazil (Pernambuco, Mato Grosso, Goiás
- Stomatanthes pinnatipartitus (Sch.Bip. ex Baker) H.Rob. - Brazil (Minas Gerais, Mato Grosso, Goiás, São Paulo)
- Stomatanthes polycephalus (Sch.Bip. ex B.L.Rob.) H.Rob. - Brazil (Minas Gerais, Bahia)
- Stomatanthes reticulatus Grossi & J.N.Nakaj. - Brazil (Minas Gerais)
- Stomatanthes subcapitatus (Malme) H.Rob. - Brazil (Paraná, São Paulo)
- Stomatanthes trigonus (Gardner) H.Rob. - Bolivia, Brazil (Minas Gerais, Mato Grosso do Sul, Rondônia, Goiás)
- Stomatanthes warmingii (Baker) H.Rob. - Brazil (Minas Gerais)
- Stomatanthes zambiensis R.M.King & H.Rob. - Malawi, Zambia
