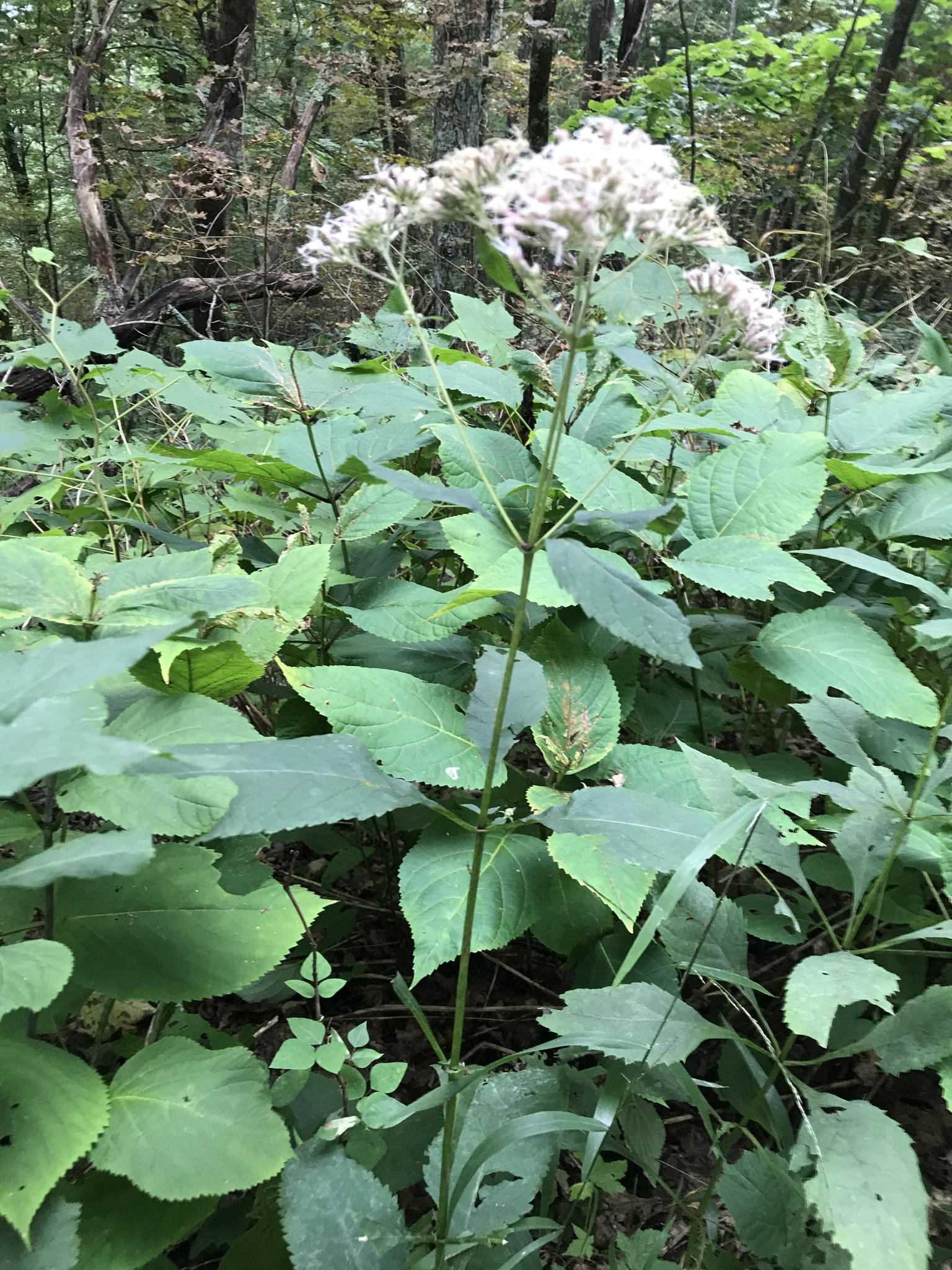

Conservation status
- Apparently Secure (NatureServe)

Scientific classification
- Kingdom: Plantae
- Clade: Tracheophytes
- Clade: Angiosperms
- Clade: Eudicots
- Clade: Asterids
- Order: Asterales
- Family: Asteraceae
- Genus: Eutrochium
- Species: E. steelei

Binomial name
- Eutrochium steelei (E.E.Lamont) E.E.Lamont 2004

Synonyms
- Eupatoriadelphus steelei (E.E.Lamont) G.J.Schmidt & E.E.Schill.; Eupatorium steelei E.E. Lamont 1990

= Eutrochium steelei =

Species of flowering plant

Eutrochium steelei, also known as Appalachian Joe-Pye weed or Steele's eupatorium, is a North American species of plants in the family Asteraceae. It is found only in the Appalachian Mountains of the eastern United States, in the States of Virginia, Kentucky, Tennessee, North Carolina, and Georgia.

Eutrochium steelei is a perennial herb sometimes as much as 200 cm (78.5 in; 6.5 ft) tall. Stems are greenish-purple, not hollow. One plant can produce many small pink or purple flower heads, each head with 5-10 disc flowers but no ray flowers.

== See also ==
- Edward Strieby Steele
