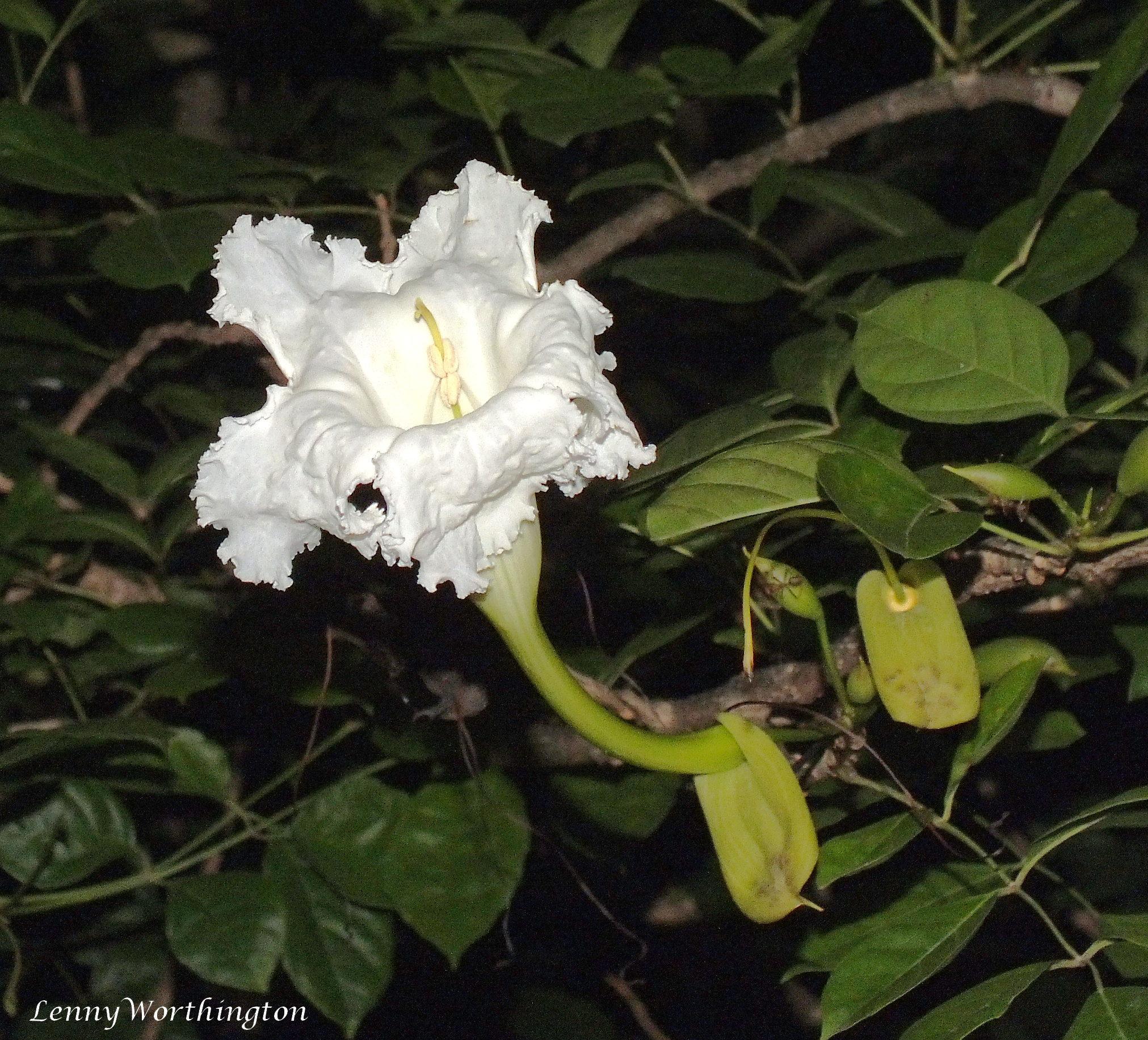

Scientific classification
- Kingdom: Plantae
- Clade: Tracheophytes
- Clade: Angiosperms
- Clade: Eudicots
- Clade: Asterids
- Order: Lamiales
- Family: Bignoniaceae
- Genus: Dolichandrone
- Species: D. serrulata

Binomial name
- Dolichandrone serrulata (Wall. ex DC.) Seem., 1870

= Dolichandrone serrulata =

Species of flowering plant

Dolichandrone serrulata (Thai: แคนา khae na or แคทราย khae sai) is a species of plant in the Bignoniaceae family. It is found in Burma, Thailand, Laos and Vietnam.

The flower is edible and is part of Thai cuisine.

== See also ==
- Edible flowers
