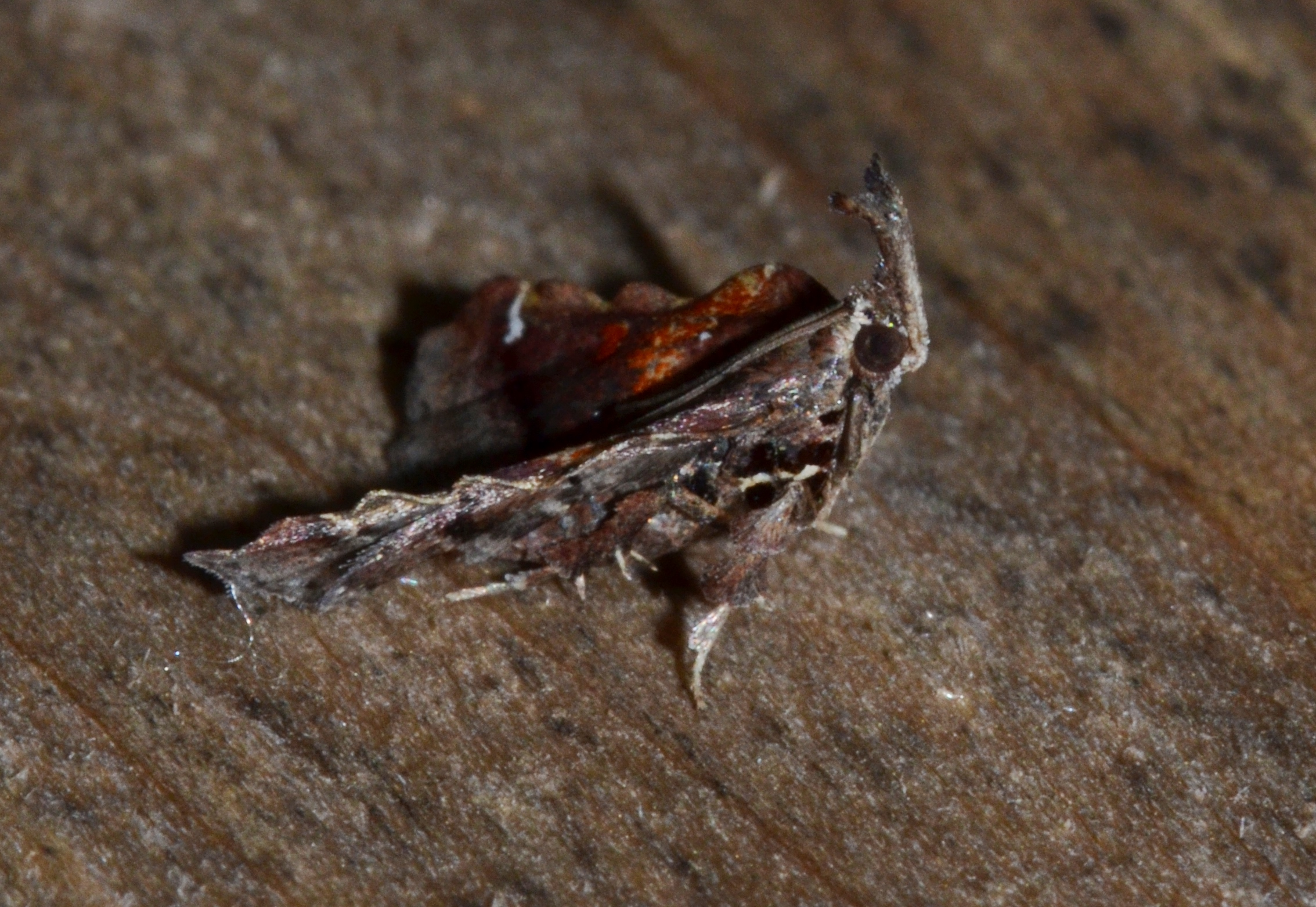

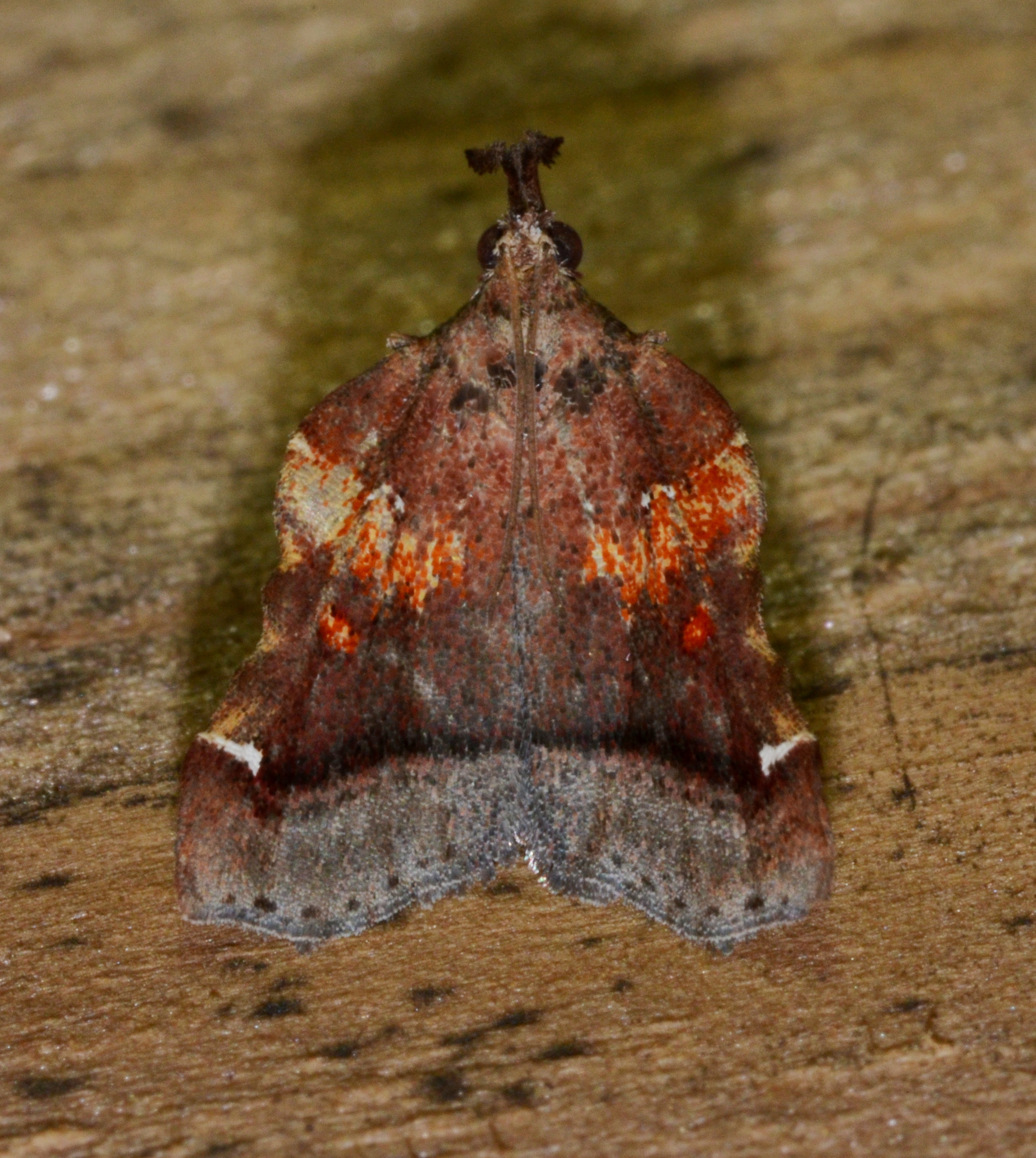

Scientific classification
- Domain: Eukaryota
- Kingdom: Animalia
- Phylum: Arthropoda
- Class: Insecta
- Order: Lepidoptera
- Family: Pyralidae
- Genus: Clydonopteron
- Species: C. sacculana

Binomial name
- Clydonopteron sacculana (Bosc, 1800)

Synonyms
- Pyralis sacculana Bosc, 1800; Clydonopteron tecomae Riley, 1880

= Clydonopteron sacculana =

Species of moth

Clydonopteron sacculana, the trumpet vine moth, is a species of snout moth. It was described by Louis Augustin Guillaume Bosc in 1800. It is found in the West Indies, Brazil and Argentina. In North America, it is found from Washington, DC to Florida, west to Missouri and Texas.

Wingspan 15–25 mm. Adults are on wing from May to August.

The larvae feed on the seed pods of Campsis radicans.
