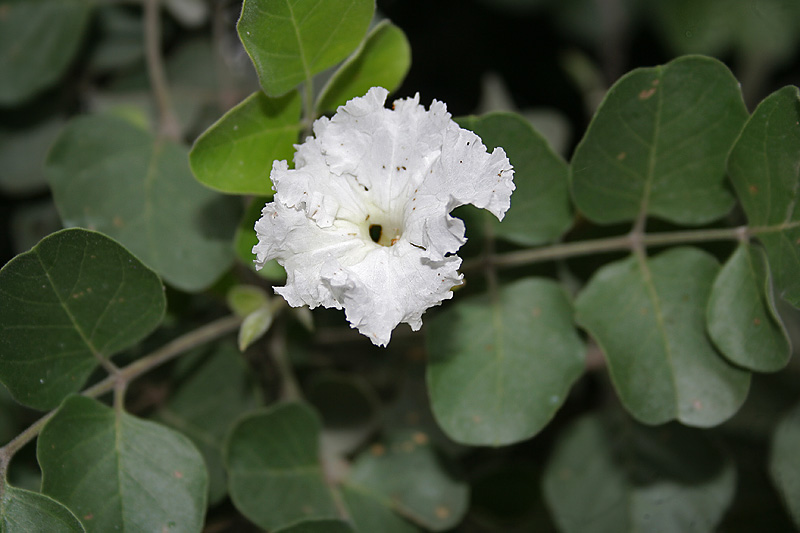

Scientific classification
- Kingdom: Plantae
- Clade: Tracheophytes
- Clade: Angiosperms
- Clade: Eudicots
- Clade: Asterids
- Order: Lamiales
- Family: Bignoniaceae
- Genus: Dolichandrone
- Species: D. falcata

Binomial name
- Dolichandrone falcata (Wall. ex DC.) Seem.

Synonyms
- Bignonia falcata K.D.Koenig ex DC. nom. illeg.; Bignonia spathacea Roxb. nom. illeg.; Dolichandrone lawii Seem.; Spathodea falcata Wall. ex DC.

= Dolichandrone falcata =

Species of flowering plant

Dolichandrone falcata is a small deciduous tree in the family Bignoniaceae. It is endemic to India. Tree attains a height of 21–428 feet. Leaves are compound 2-6 inches long with 3-6 obovate or oval shaped leaflets. Flowers are white and fragrant. Flowering occurs in April–May.
