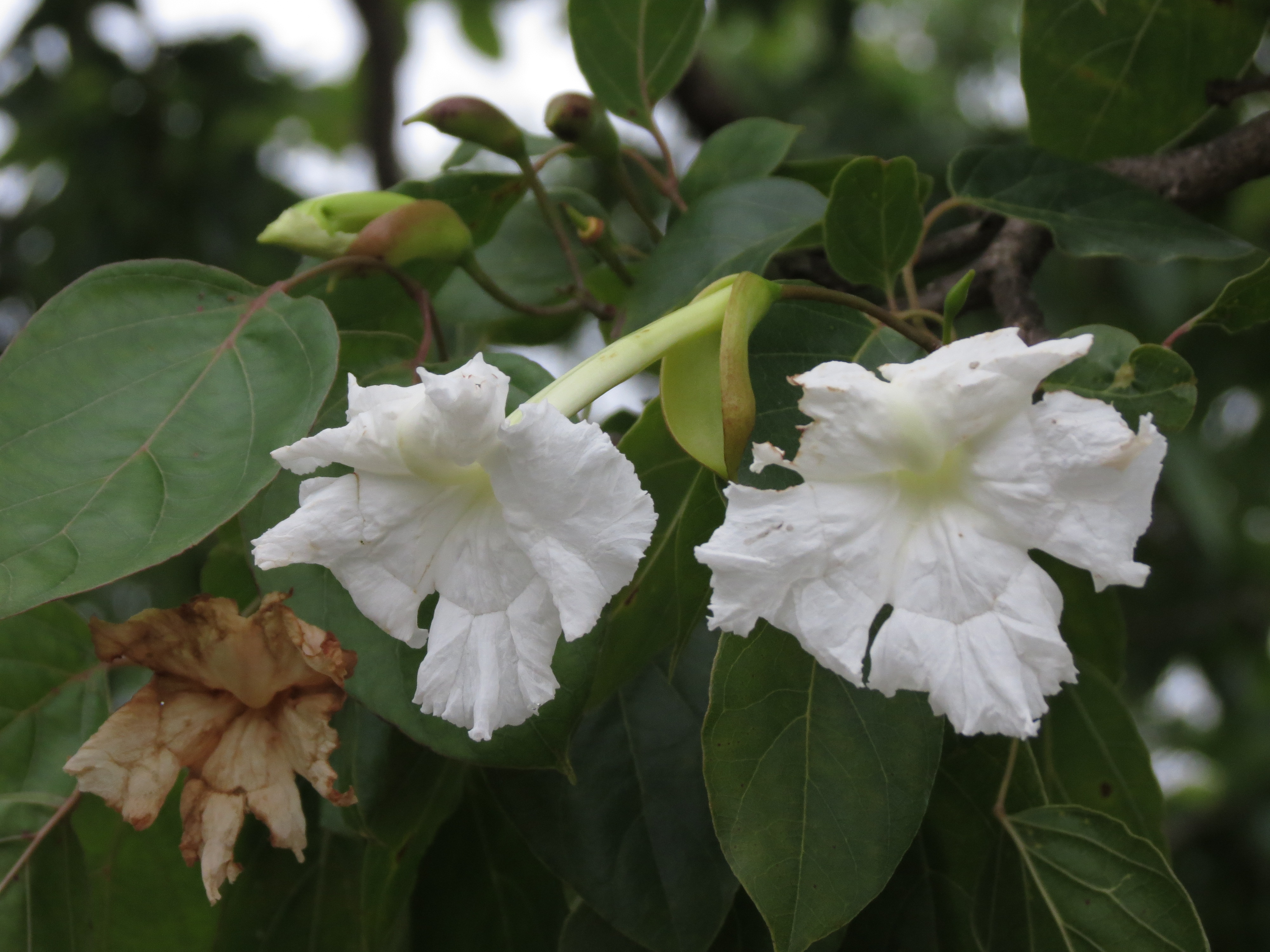
- Flowers

Scientific classification
- Kingdom: Plantae
- Clade: Tracheophytes
- Clade: Angiosperms
- Clade: Eudicots
- Clade: Asterids
- Order: Lamiales
- Family: Bignoniaceae
- Genus: Dolichandrone
- Species: D. atrovirens

Binomial name
- Dolichandrone atrovirens (Roth) K.Schum.

Synonyms
- Bignonia atrovirens Roth; Bignonia crispa Buch.-Ham. ex Roxb.; Dolichandrone crispa (Buch.-Ham. ex Roxb.) Seem.; Spathodea crispa G.Don

= Dolichandrone atrovirens =

Species of flowering plant

Dolichandrone atrovirens, also known as wavy trumpet flower, is a deciduous tree in the family Bignoniaceae. It is endemic to the Indian subcontinent.

== Description ==
The tree attains a height of 16 m. Leaves are pinnate compound 10 cm long on a 5 cm long stalk. Flowering occurs in April–June. Flowers are trumpet-shaped and white. The fruit capsule is up to 30 cm long.
