= Angel's trumpet =

Angel's trumpet (also Angel's-trumpet and Angel's-trumpets) may refer to:

- two closely related genera of poisonous flowering plants in the family Solanaceae:
  - Brugmansia, woody plants with pendulous flowers
    - Brugmansia × candida, a widespread garden plant
  - Datura, herbaceous plants with erect flowespines

== See also ==
- Trumpet flower, other plants with trumpet-like flowers
