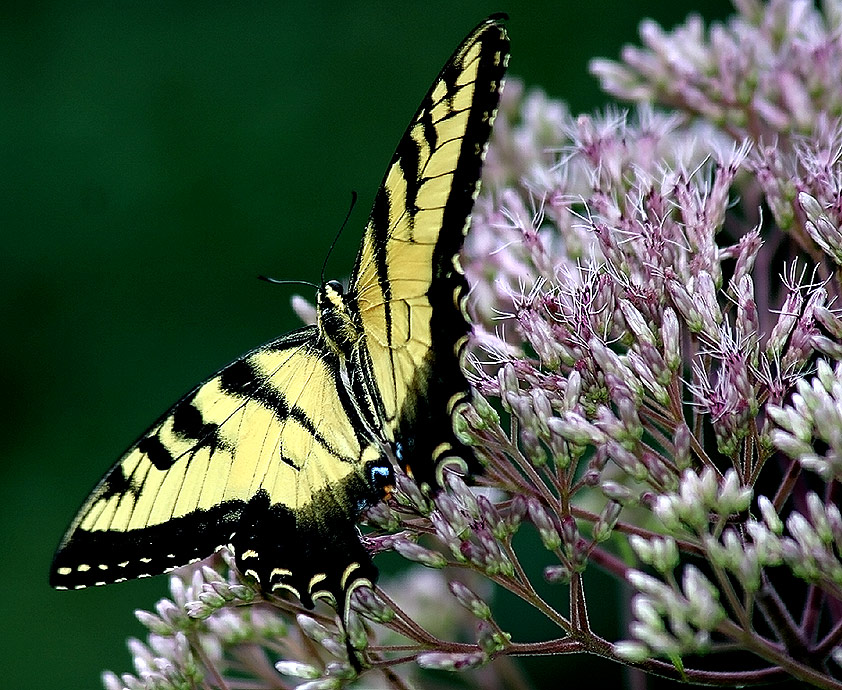
- Eutrochium fistulosum with a butterfly

Scientific classification
- Kingdom: Plantae
- Clade: Tracheophytes
- Clade: Angiosperms
- Clade: Eudicots
- Clade: Asterids
- Order: Asterales
- Family: Asteraceae
- Genus: Eutrochium
- Species: E. fistulosum

Binomial name
- Eutrochium fistulosum (Barratt) E.E.Lamont

Synonyms
- Eupatorium fistulosum Barratt; Eupatoriadelphus fistulosus (Barratt) R.M. King & H. Rob.

= Eutrochium fistulosum =

Species of flowering plant

Eutrochium fistulosum (Eupatorium fistulosum), also called hollow Joe-Pye weed, trumpetweed, or purple thoroughwort, is a perennial North American flowering plant in the family Asteraceae. It is native to southern Canada and throughout the eastern and south central United States from Maine west to Ontario, Wisconsin, and Missouri and south as far as Florida and Texas. The specific name fistulosum refers to the tubular stem; see fistula.

Eutrochium fistulosum is a herbaceous perennial plant sometimes as much as 350 cm (140 in; 11 ft 6 in) tall. It is found in moist, rich soil alongside ditches and marshes, or in wet forests. It flowers from mid-summer to the first frosts, makes an attractive backdrop in garden plots, and is very attractive to butterflies, bees, and other nectar-feeding insects. In addition, it is a larval host to the Clymene moth, eupatorium borer moth, ruby tiger moth, and the three-lined flower moth.

The plant has one simple erect stem, which is green with purple dots or longitudinal dashes and can grow over six feet tall. The upper stems are reddish or purplish. Leaves and primary subdivisions of the flower head appear in whorls of 3–5 (rarely 2 or 6, the rotational symmetry of most plants is consistent). Leaves are large, long and sharply toothed. One plant can produce several flower heads in a branching array, each head with 4-7 pink or purple disc flowers but no ray flowers.

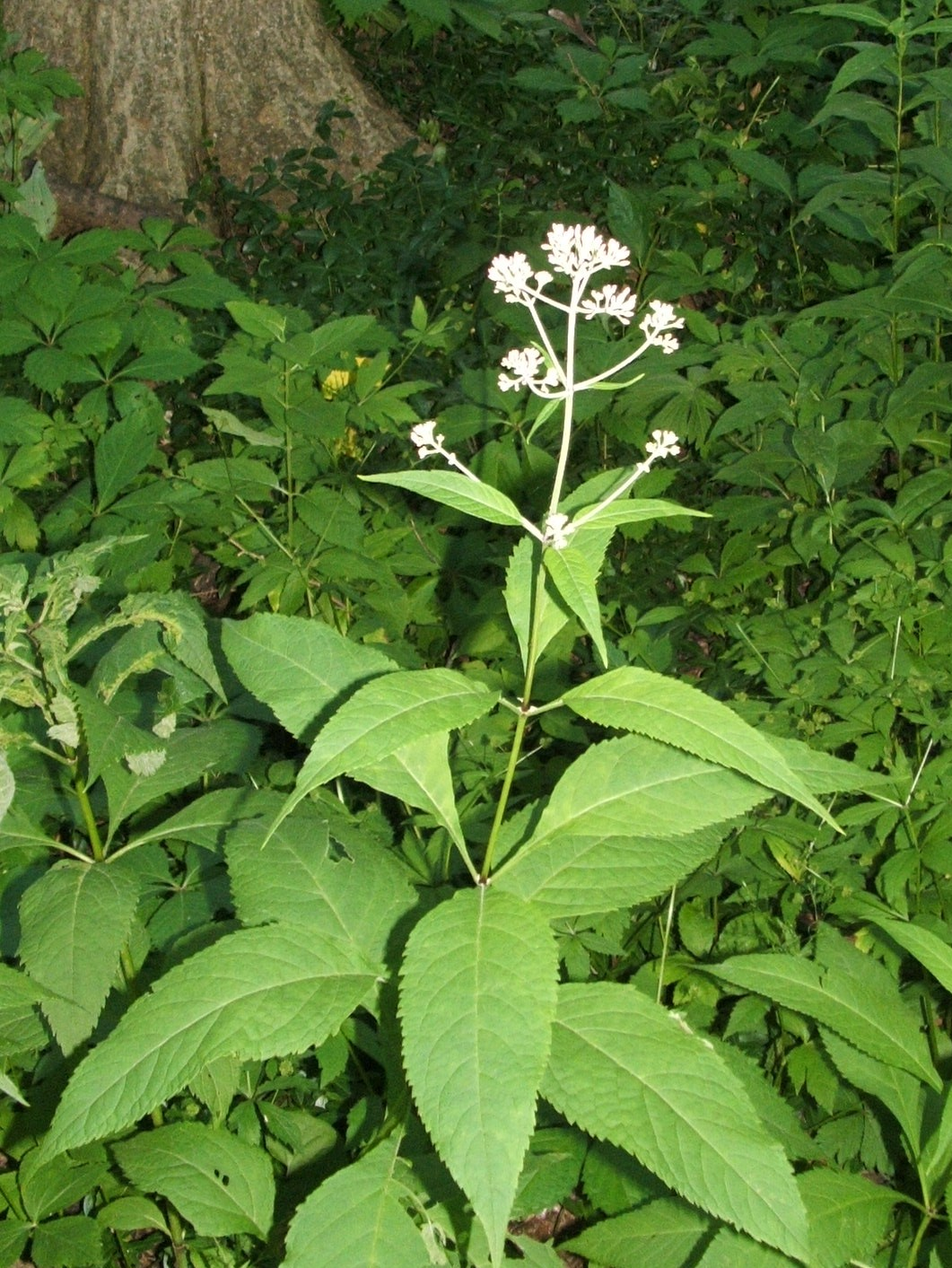
3-fold symmetry

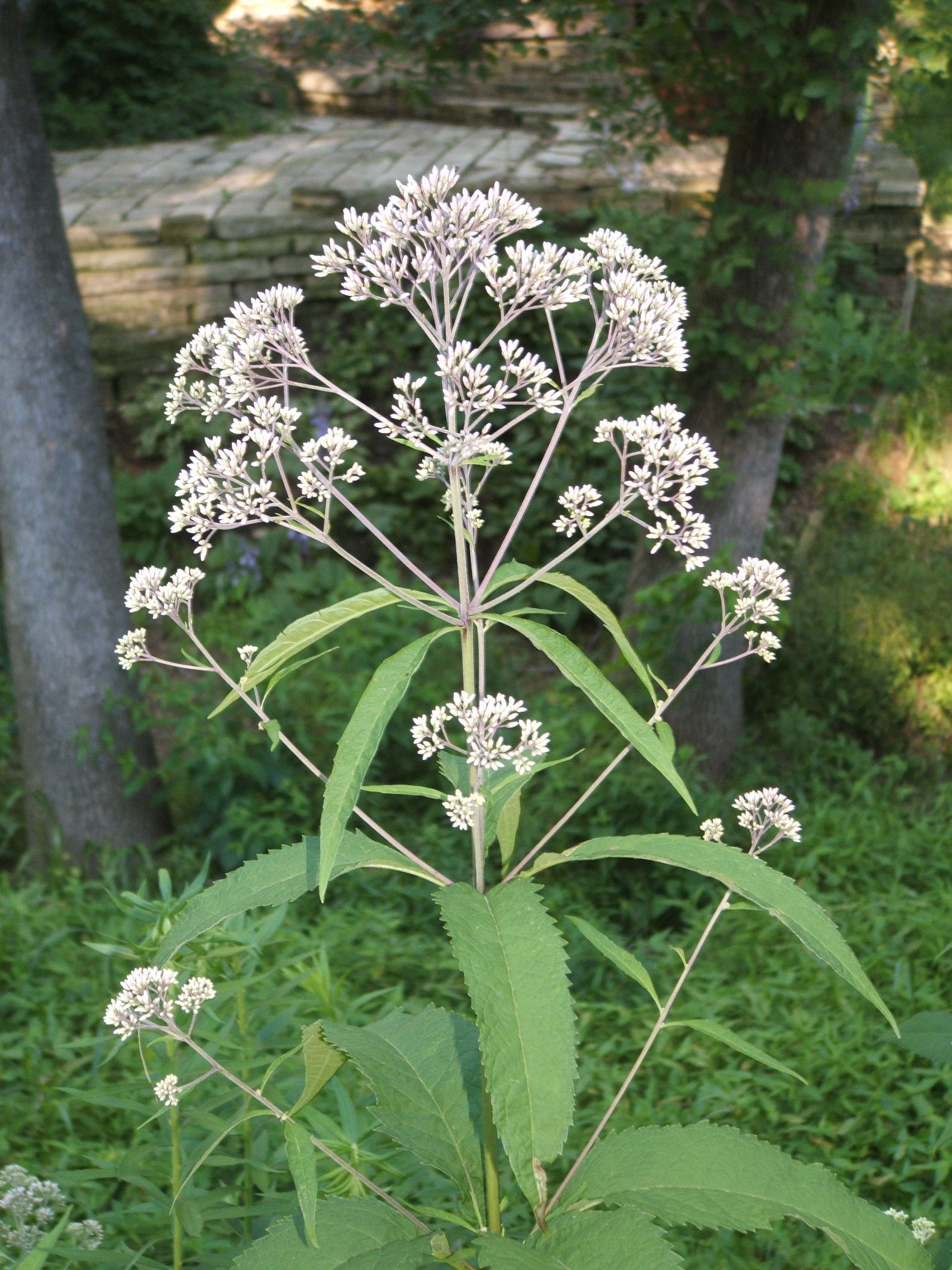
4-fold symmetry

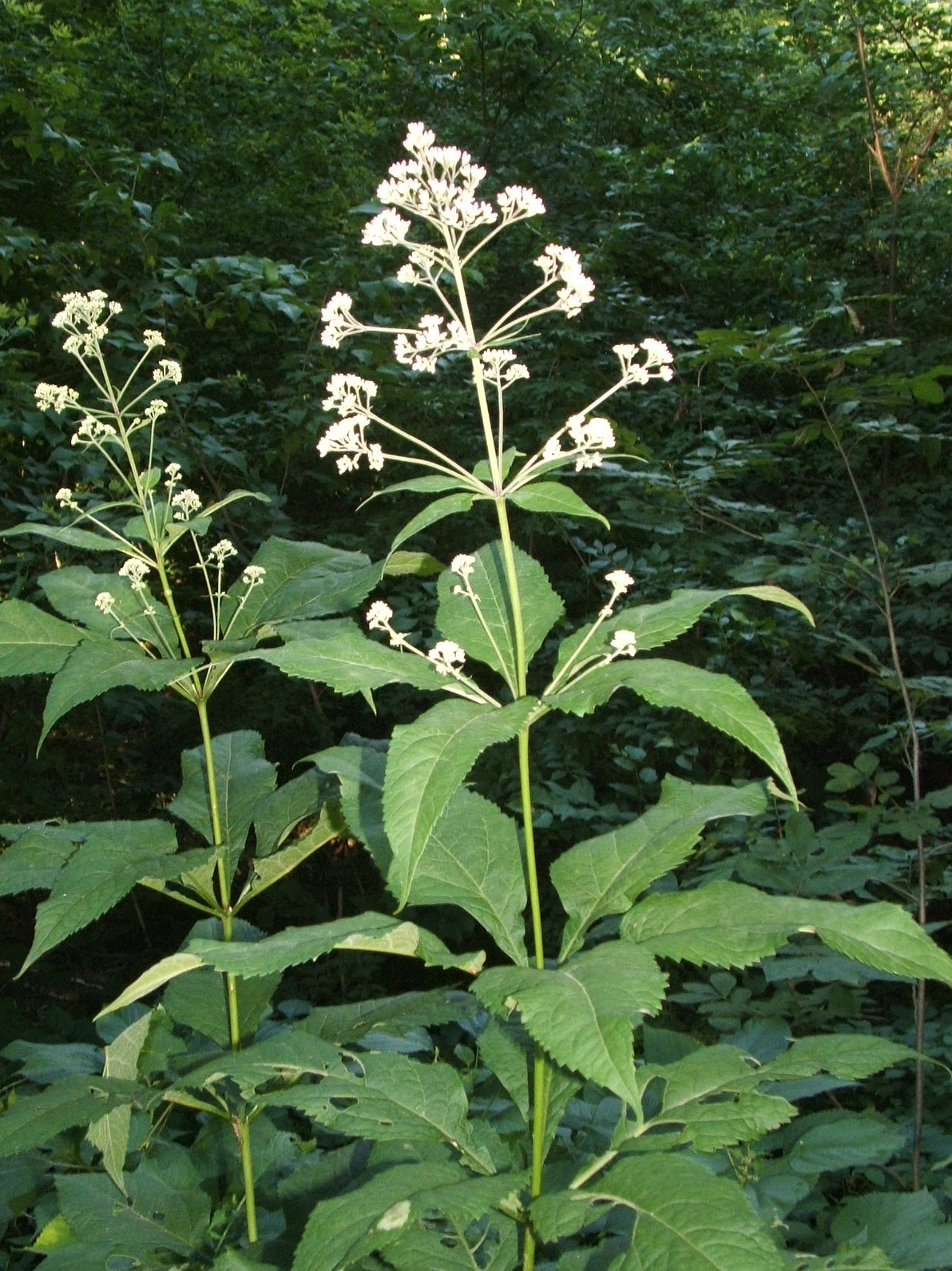
5-fold symmetry

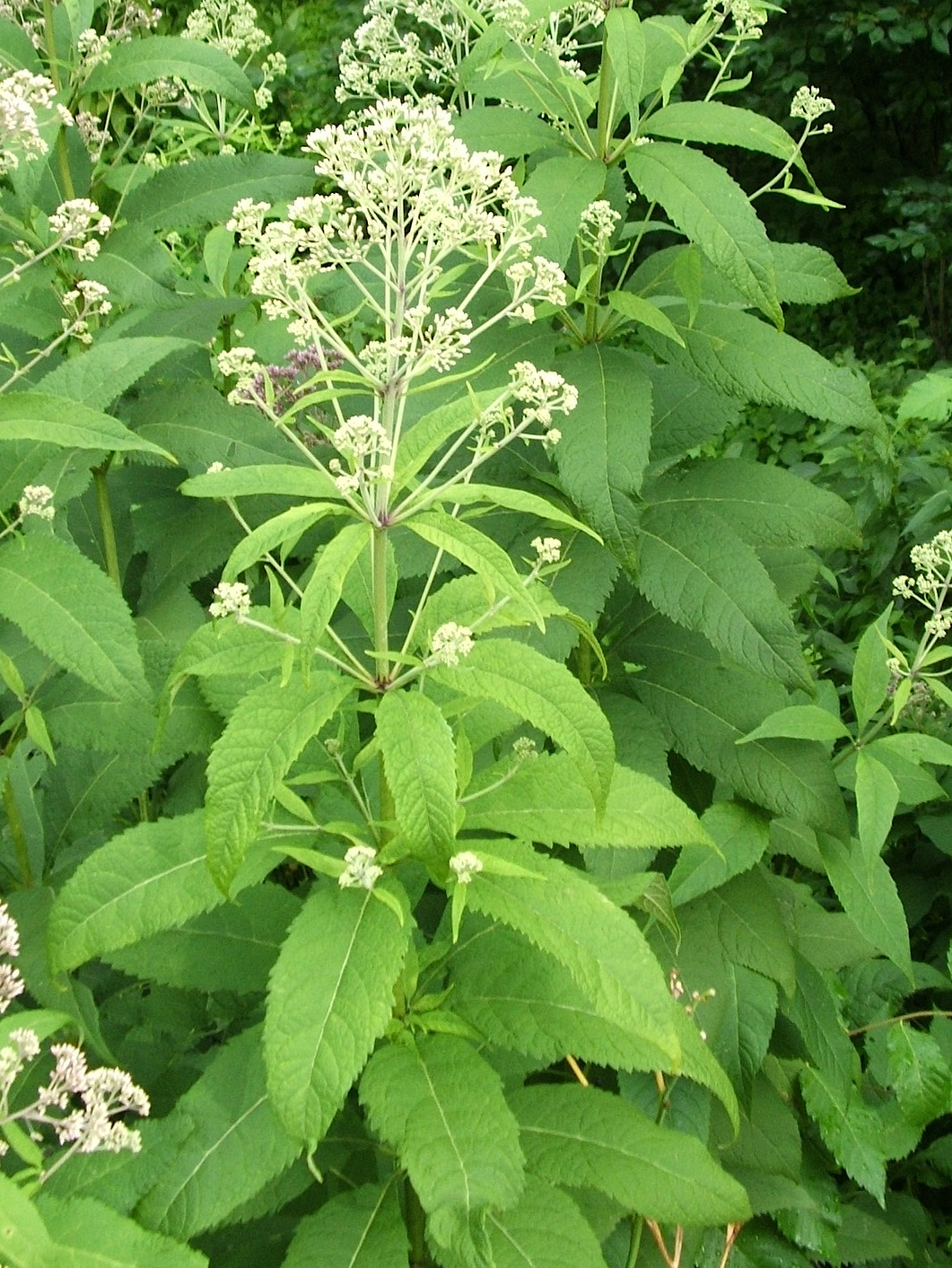
6-fold (uncommon)

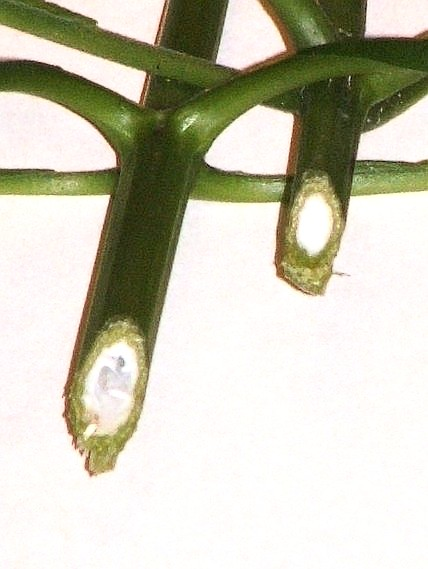
Stem sections
