= Farmingdale, Illinois =

- Unincorporated community
- Location within Illinois Location within the United States
- Coordinates: 39°49′22″N 89°48′22″W
- Country: United States
- State: Illinois
- County: Sangamon
- Elevation: 581 ft (177 m)
- Time zone: UTC-6 (Central (CST))
  - Summer (DST): UTC-5 (CDT)
- Area code: 217
- GNIS feature ID: 422692

Farmingdale is an unincorporated community in Sangamon County, Illinois, United States. Farmingdale is 8.5 miles (13.7 km) west-northwest of Springfield.
