= Bugleweed =

The name bugleweed is a common name which can refer to several unrelated plants:

- Ajuga, especially
  - Ajuga reptans, the most common species in the British Isles
- Lycopus, the genus to which the gypsywort belongs
