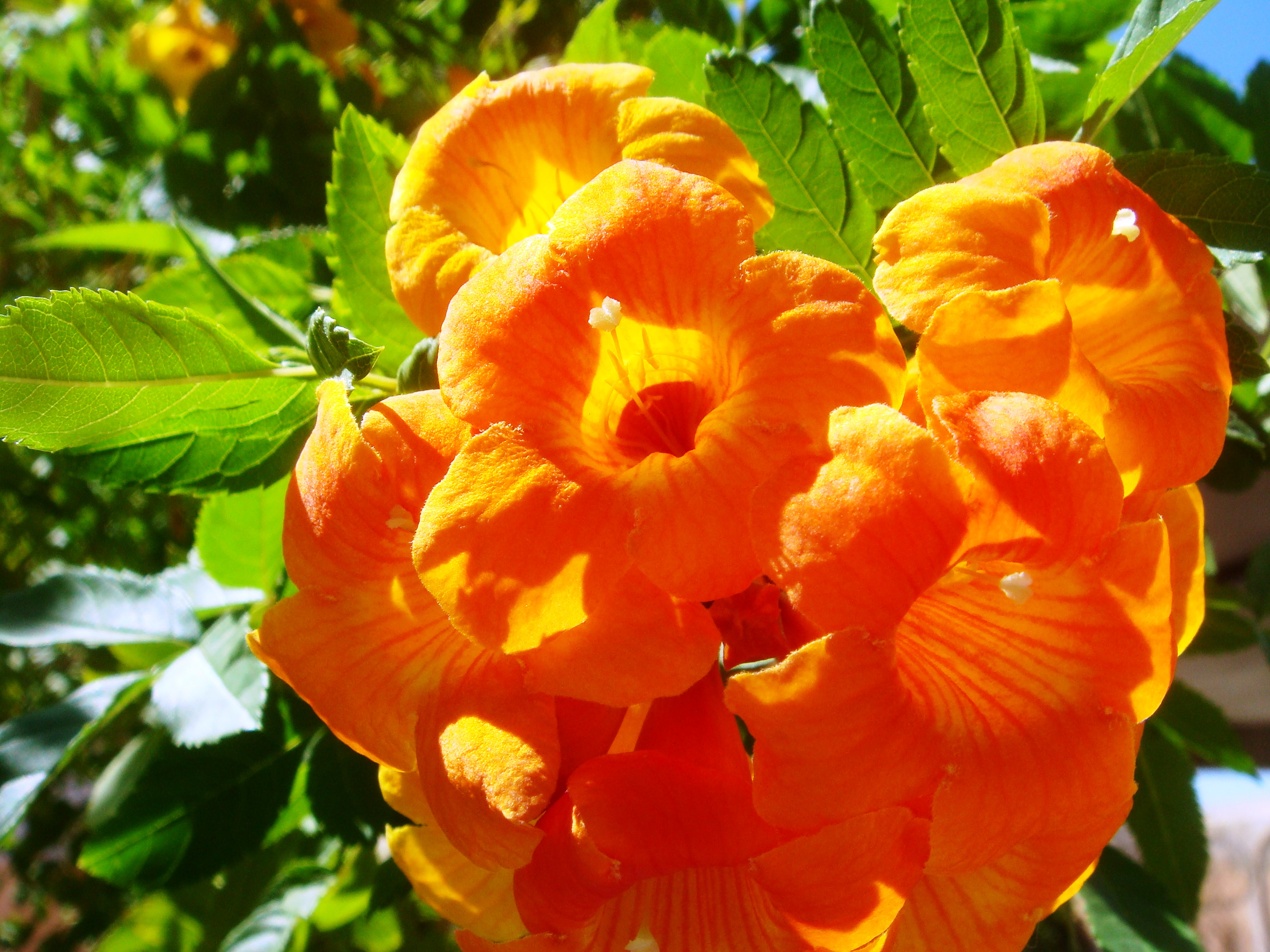
- Campsis radicans

Scientific classification
- Kingdom: Plantae
- Clade: Tracheophytes
- Clade: Angiosperms
- Clade: Eudicots
- Clade: Asterids
- Order: Lamiales
- Family: Bignoniaceae
- Tribe: Tecomeae
- Genus: Campsis; Lour.

Species
- Campsis grandiflora; Campsis radicans

= Campsis =

Genus of vines

Campsis, commonly known as trumpet creeper or trumpet vine, is a genus of flowering plants in the family Bignoniaceae, native to woodlands in China and North America. It consists of two species, both of which are vigorous deciduous perennial climbers, clinging by aerial roots, and producing large trumpet-shaped flowers in the summer. They are reasonably hardy and do well with the support of a wall, preferring full sun.

== Species ==
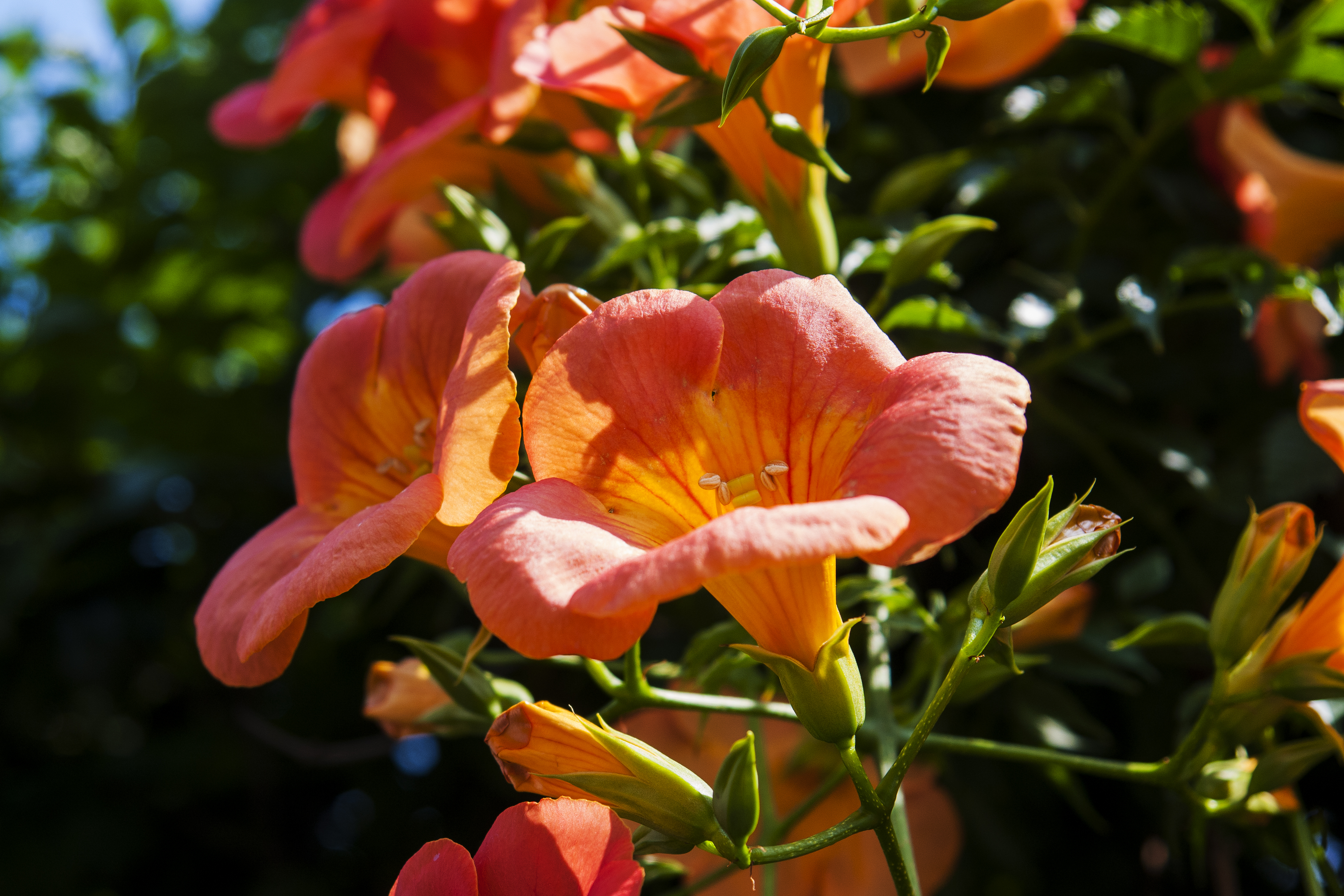
Campsis grandiflora

- Campsis grandiflora K.Schum. – Chinese trumpet vine (East Asia)
- Campsis radicans (L.) Bureau – American trumpet vine (Southeastern United States)

== Hybrids ==
- Campsis × tagliabuana (Madame Galen), a mid-19th century hybrid between Campsis grandiflora and Campsis radicans

== See also ==
- Trumpet flower (disambiguation)
