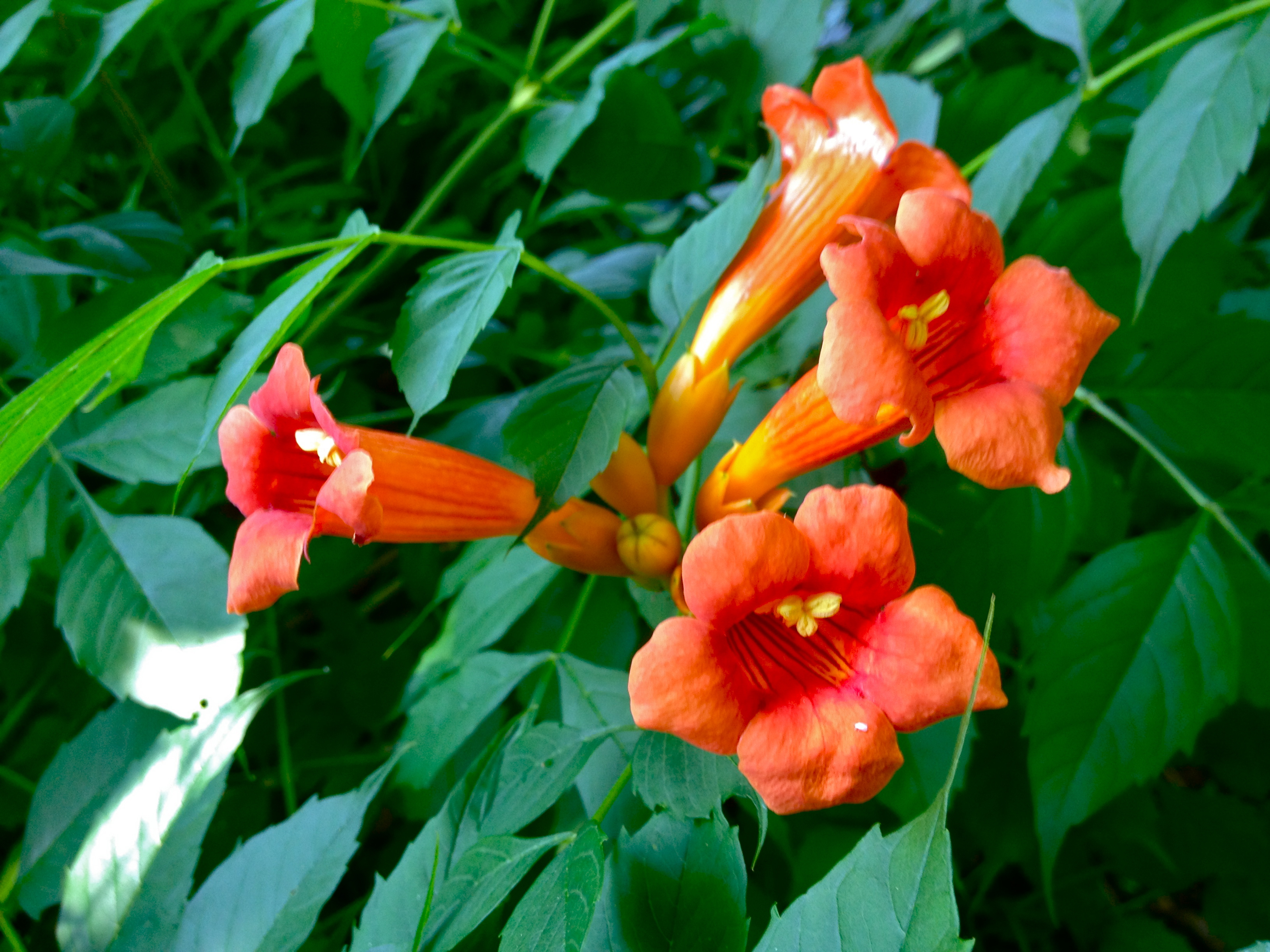

Conservation status
- Secure (NatureServe)

Scientific classification
- Kingdom: Plantae
- Clade: Tracheophytes
- Clade: Angiosperms
- Clade: Eudicots
- Clade: Asterids
- Order: Lamiales
- Family: Bignoniaceae
- Genus: Campsis
- Species: C. radicans

Binomial name
- Campsis radicans (L.) Bureau (1864)

Synonyms
- Bignonia radicans L. (1753); Tecoma radicans (L.) Juss.; Gelseminum radicans (L.) Kuntze; Bignonia florida Salisb.; Bignonia coccinea Steud.; Campsis curtisii Seem.

= Campsis radicans =

Trumpet vine

Species of vine

Campsis radicans, the trumpet vine, yellow trumpet vine, or trumpet creeper (also known in North America as cow-itch vine or hummingbird vine), is a species of flowering plant in the trumpet vine family Bignoniaceae, native to eastern North America, and naturalized elsewhere. Growing to 10 metres (33 feet), it is a vigorous, deciduous woody vine, notable for its showy trumpet-shaped flowers. It inhabits woodlands and riverbanks, and is also a popular garden plant.

== Description ==
C. radicans is a vine that climbs on trees, other plants, or structures or trails along the ground and can grow to a length of up to 10 metres (33 feet). From the main vine, rigid or woody arching vines up to 2 metres (7 feet) long extend outward. The plant can form a dense groundcover or an aggressive liana covering plants or buildings. The leaves are opposite and odd-pinnately compound, meaning there is an odd number of leaflets, with one terminal leaflet.

C. radicans climbs through aerial rootlets and twining stems; these stems grow upwards of 12 m in length. Its bark is tan in color, and shreds easily.

Leaves are up to 18 centimetres (7 inches) long with 7 to 13 leaflets that are each about 8 centimetres (3 inches) long and 4 centimetres (1.5 inches) wide. The leaflets are emerald green when new, maturing into a shiny dark green. They are ovate to broadly lanceolate and the edges are coarsely serrate.

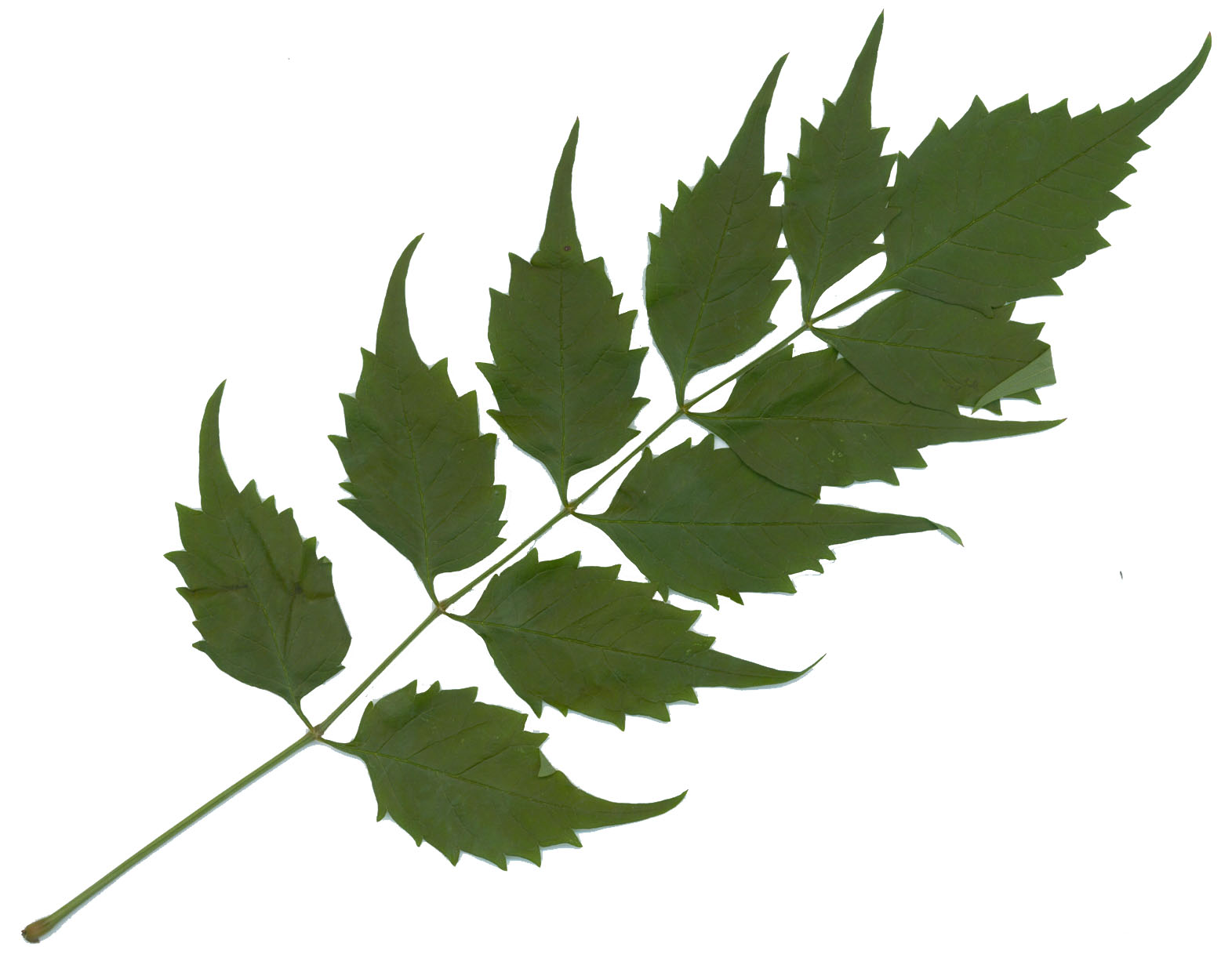
Typical leaf

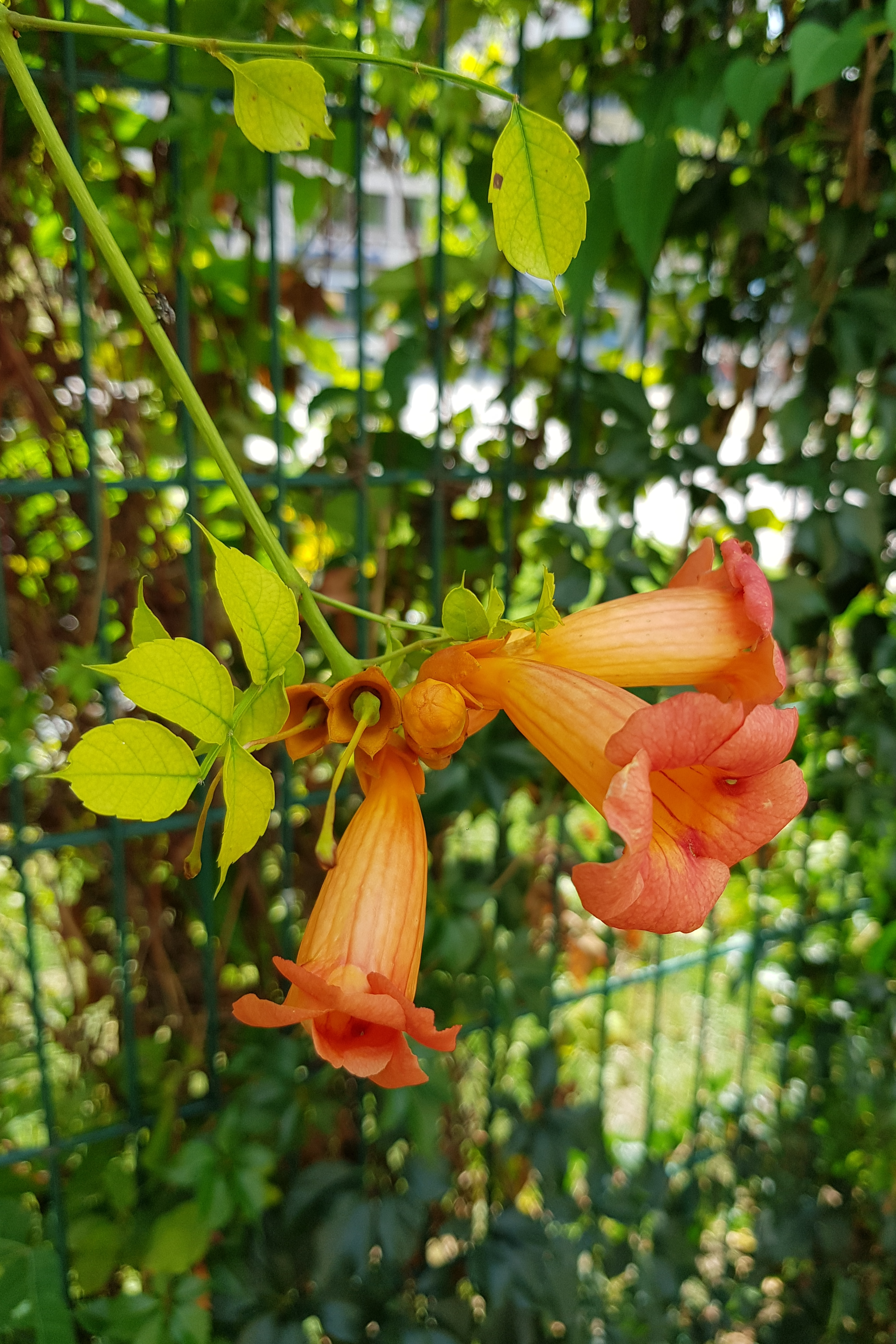
Blossoms and small fruit sets

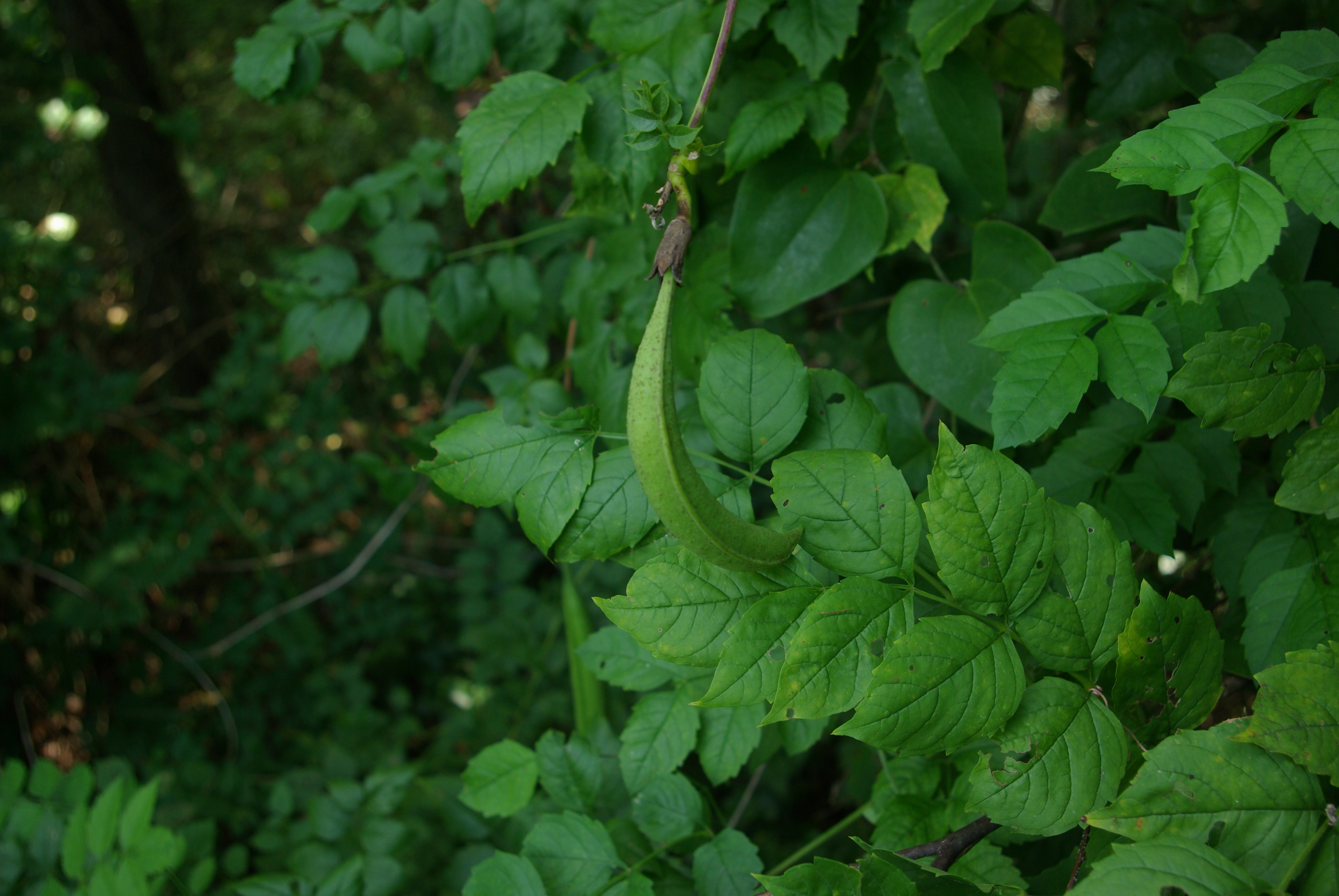
Seed pod and leaves of Campsis radicans

=== Inflorescences ===
The flowers come in terminal cymes of two to eight. Each flower is up to 9 centimetres (3.5 inches) long and trumpet shaped. They are orange to reddish orange in color with a yellowish throat and 5 shallow lobes bending backward. They generally appear after several months of warm weather. The flowers have no floral scent. After flowering, a long seed capsule about 15 centimetres (6 inches) long appears, eventually splitting in two to disperse its seeds.

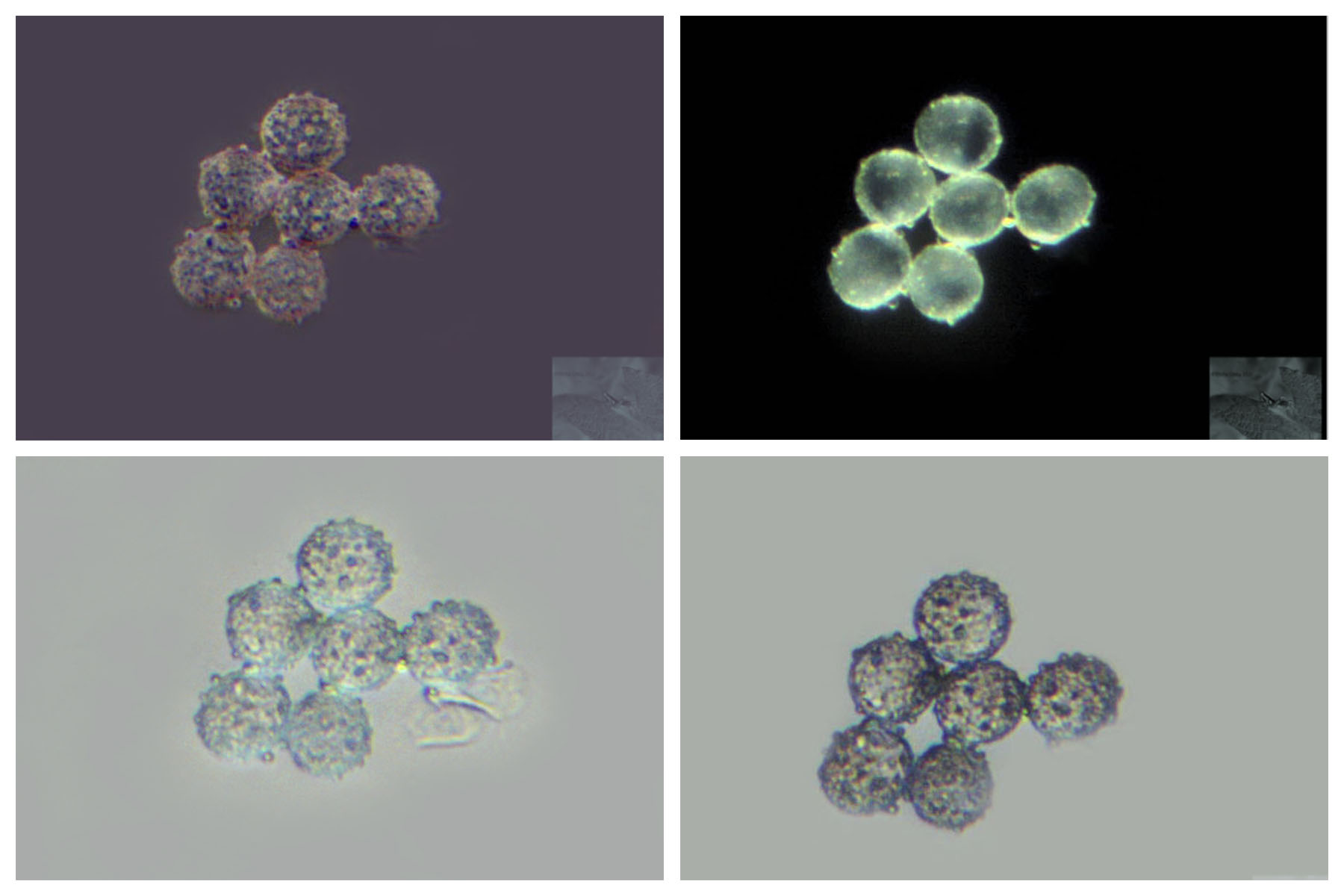
Pollen under microscope

== Taxonomy ==
The botanical parentage of Campsis radicans, as a hardy member of a mostly subtropical group, made its naming problematic: according to John Parkinson, the Virginia settlers were at first calling it a jasmine or a honeysuckle, and then a bellflower; he classed it in the genus Apocynum (dogbane). Joseph Pitton de Tournefort erected a catch-all genus Bignonia in 1700, from which it has since been extricated.

== Etymology ==
The Latin specific epithet radicans means 'with stems that take root'. The plant is commonly known as cow-itch vine because skin redness and itching is experienced by some people after coming in contact with the leaves.

== Distribution ==
Campsis radicans is native to the eastern United States and extreme southern Ontario in Canada. It is naturalized in parts of the western United States as well as in Ontario and southern Quebec, parts of Europe, and scattered locations in Latin America.

== Ecology ==
In the pre-Columbian landscape, C. radicans was mostly limited to bottomlands in swamps, but has since become a successful colonizer of thickets, fencerows, and abandoned farmland. C. radicans can also be found in floodplain forests, including along their edges, and on river banks.

The flowers bloom in the summer for about three months and are very attractive to hummingbirds such as the ruby-throated hummingbird, while many types of birds like to nest in the dense foliage. Halictid bees, flies, and ants also feed on the nectar of the plant's extra-floral nectaries. Nectar robbing behavior has been observed to be performed by orchard orioles (Icterus spurius), which puncture and enlarge holes in the flower base to access nectaries. Certain sphinx moths with elongate proboscises are able to successfully feed on trumpet vines while hovering in front of the flower.

The flowers are followed by large seed pods. As these mature, they dry and split. Hundreds of thin, brown, paper-like seeds are released. These are easily grown when stratified. Larvae of Clydonopteron sacculana (the trumpet vine moth) feed on the seed pods.

C. radicans occasionally acts as a food source for large mammals. However, the plant is slightly toxic if ingested, and contact with flowers and leaves can result in swelling and skin redness.

C. radicans is sometimes considered a weedy species. Thinning the vines during the growing season and cutting them back during winter can help to limit their aggressive spread.

== Cultivation ==
The trumpet vine grows vigorously. In warm weather, it puts out aerial rootlets that grab onto every available surface, and eventually expand into heavy woody stems several centimeters in diameter. It grows well on arbors, fences, telephone poles, and trees, although it may dismember them in the process. Ruthless pruning is recommended. Outside of its native range this species has the potential to be invasive, even as far north as New England. The trumpet vine thrives in many places in southern Canada as well.

Away from summer heat, C. radicans is less profuse of flower. A larger-flowered hybrid 'Mme Galen' was introduced about 1889 by the Tagliabue nurserymen of Lainate near Milan.

The form C. radicans f. flava has gained the Royal Horticultural Society's Award of Garden Merit.

A deeper red form "Flamenco" is available.

== Toxicity ==
The plant can cause contact dermatitis.
