= Monocrotaline =

- Skeleton formula of a carbon ring, containing oxygen, hydrogen and nitrogen atoms. It is supposed to be monocrotaline Chemical structure of monocrotaline

Names
- IUPAC name (1R,4R,5R,6R,16R)-5,6-dihydroxy-4,5,6-trimethyl-2,8-dioxa-13-azatricyclo[8.5.1.013,16]hexadec-10-ene-3,7-dione
- Other names: Crotaline; (-)-Monocrotaline; Retronecine cyclic 2,3-dihydroxy-2,3,4-trimethylglutarate

Identifiers
CAS Number	315-22-0
3D model (JSmol)	Interactive image
ChEBI	CHEBI:6980
ChEMBL	ChEMBL521035
ChemSpider	9044
ECHA InfoCard	100.156.772
EC Number	628-506-2
KEGG	C10350
PubChem CID	9415
UNII	73077K8HYV
CompTox Dashboard (EPA)	DTXSID9020902
- InChI: InChI=1S/C16H23NO6/c1-9-13(18)23-11-5-7-17-6-4-10(12(11)17)8-22-14(19)16(3,21)15(9,2)20/h4,9,11-12,20-21H,5-8H2,1-3H3/t9-,11+,12+,15+,16-/m0/s1 Key: QVCMHGGNRFRMAD-XFGHUUIASA-N
- SMILES: C[C@H]1C(=O)O[C@@H]2CCN3[C@@H]2C(=CC3)COC(=O)[C@]([C@]1(C)O)(C)O

Properties
Chemical formula	C_{16}H_{23}NO_{6}
Molar mass	325.361 g·mol^{−1}
Appearance	Crystalline solid
Melting point	204 °C (399 °F; 477 K)
Solubility in water	Slightly soluble

Hazards
- GHS labelling
Pictograms	(GHS06: Toxic) (GHS08: Health hazard)
Hazard statements	H301, H351
Precautionary statements	P203, P264, P270, P280, P301+P316, P318, P321, P330, P405, P501
- Lethal dose or concentration (LD, LC)
LD_{50} (median dose)	66 mg/kg (rat, oral) / 259 mg/kg (mouse) intravenous)
- Except where otherwise noted, data are given for materials in their standard state (at 25 °C [77 °F], 100 kPa). Infobox references

Monocrotaline (MCT) is a pyrrolizidine alkaloid that is present in plants of the Crotalaria genus. These species can synthesise MCT out of amino acids and can cause liver, lung and kidney damage in various organisms. Initial stress factors are released intracellular upon binding of MCT to BMPR2 receptors and elevated MAPK phosphorylation levels are induced, which can cause cancer in Homo sapiens. MCT can be detoxified in rats via oxidation, followed by glutathione-conjugation and hydrolysis.

== Origin ==
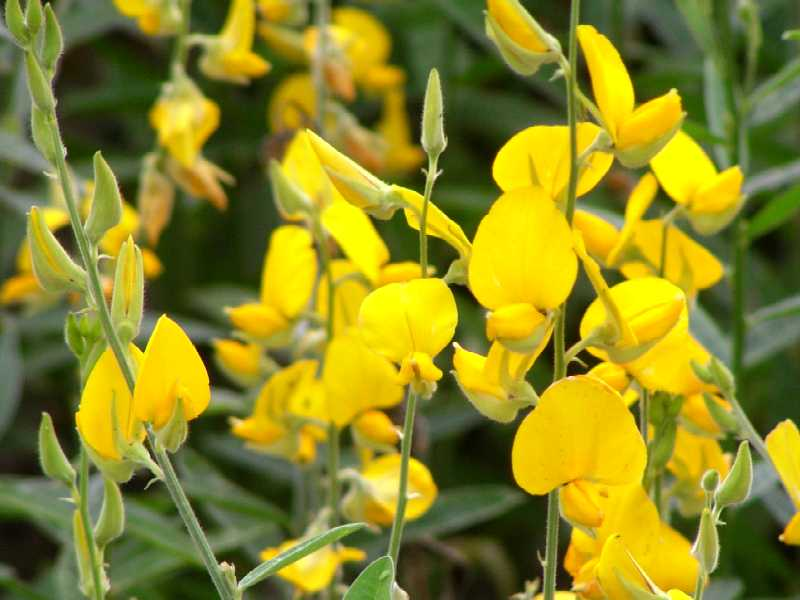
Picture of the Crotalaria spectabilis.

MCT occurs in the seeds of certain species of the genus Crotalaria, for example, Crotalaria spectabilis and Crotalaria mucronata. MCT is a chemical with pesticide properties and therefore serves as a defence mechanism to fend off predators. However, it can also lead to the poisoning of mammals and birds.

The butterfly Utetheisa ornatrix also benefits from MCT by using it as protection. The larvae of the butterfly feed almost exclusively on Crotalaria seeds, where MCT is accumulated in their bodies. In this way, they are protected from predators such as spiders for the rest of their lives (even after pupation as butterflies).

== Toxicity ==
MCT is an acute toxic substance. The toxicity of MCT is dose-dependent, and it can harm both organs and genetic material (genotoxicity). The organs that will be targeted are the liver (hepatotoxicity), the kidneys (nephrotoxicity) and the lungs (pneumotoxicity). MCT falls into Category 3 toxicity for oral ingestion and Category 2 toxicity for carcinogenicity according to the European Chemicals Agency (ECHA).

Studies concluded that the ingestion of MCT will cause centrilobular necrosis, pulmonary fibrosis and increase in blood urea nitrogen. These conclusions are based on the models that were used during these studies as these effects were caused in rats instead of humans. During the studies it was also concluded that mice are more resilient to MCT than rats, meaning that more mice survived the experiments than rats.

== Biosynthesis of monocrotaline ==
The biosynthesis of MCT involves condensation of monocrotalic acid (MCA), which is derived from L-isoleucine, and retronecine, which is derived from putrescine.

MCA is formed from L-isoleucine and a synthon for propionate of uncertain origin.

Retronecine is synthesized from L-arginine via a multi-step pathway involving putrescine and spermidine intermediates:

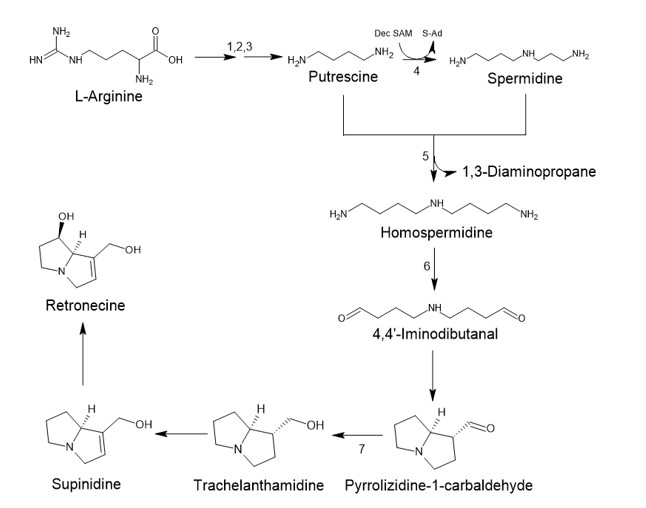
Biosynthesis route of retronecine in plants.

Putrescine is converted to spermidine by addition of a propylamino group from decarboxylated S-adenosylmethioninamine (4: spermidine synthase). Spermidine and another molecule of putrescine react to form the symmetric homospermidine with loss of 1,3-diaminopropane (5: homospermidine synthase).

Oxidation (likely catalysed by 6: copper-dependent diamine oxidases) to 4,4’-iminodibutanal results into the cyclization of pyrrolizidine-1-carbaldehyde, which is reduced to 1-hydroxymethyl pyrrolizidine (likely catalysed by 7: alcohol dehydrogenase). To form the final product retronecine, 1-hydroxymethyl pyrrolizidine is desaturated and hydroxylated respectively by unknown enzymes.

MCA and retronecine are then condensed to form MCT via an unknown mechanism:

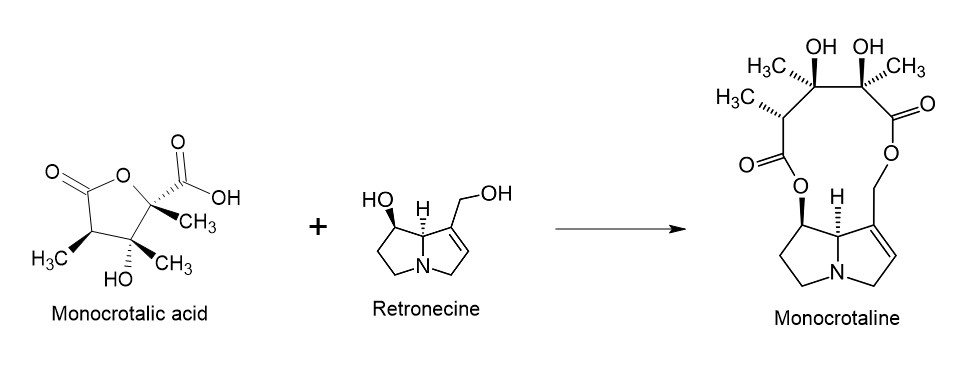
Biosynthesis of monocrotaline in plants.

== Biotransformation of monocrotaline ==
MCT is detoxified in rats by the liver via divergent biotransformation reactions. These reactions proceed as follows:

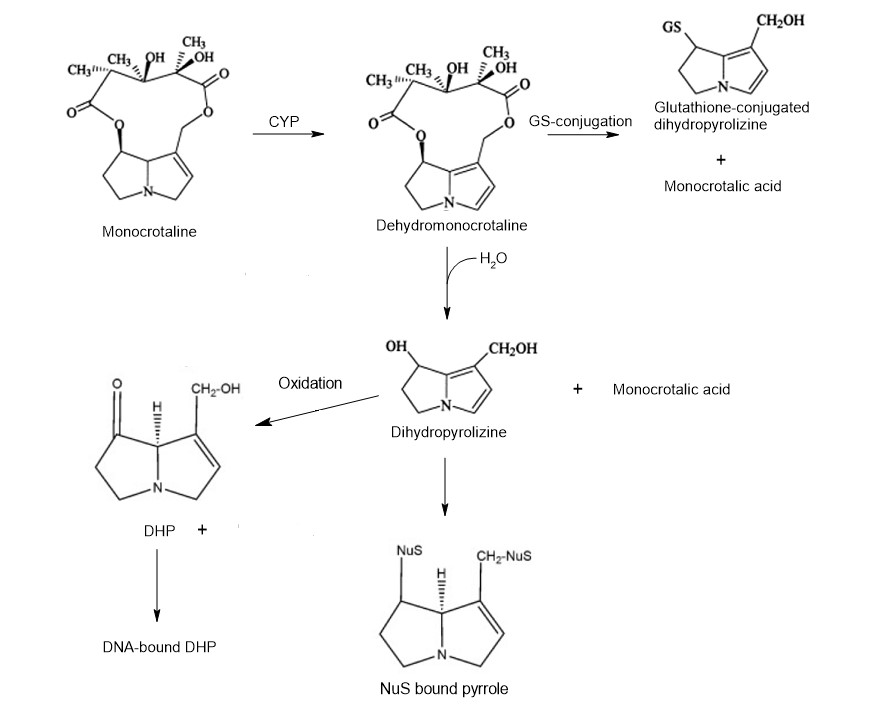
Biotransformation route of monocrotaline in rats.

In Rats, MCT is first oxidised by the biotransformation enzyme cytochrome P450 (CYP) to form dehydro MCT. In this phase 1 reaction a double carbon-carbon bond is introduced out of a single carbon-carbon bond.

After the phase 1 reaction, the oxidised intermediate can either undergo hydrolysis to form monocrotalic acid and dihydropyrolizine or perform group transfer with glutathione to form MCA and a glutathione-conjugated dihydropyrolizine (GS-conjugation). These metabolites are more hydrophilic than MCT and could therefore be more easily excreted by the kidneys, which results in less exposure from MCT to the liver. The phase 2 reactions are thus classified as the detoxifying reactions during the biotransformation of MCT in rats.

During the phase 2 reactions, dehydro MCT can react with nucleophilic biological macromolecules (NuS) which is a toxic intermediate. Addition of such molecules may result into Cytotoxicity. Dehydro MCT may also undergo further toxification after hydrolysis, as dihydropyrolizine can be further oxidized to 7-dihydro-1-hydroxymethyl-5H-pyrrolizine (DHP). This intermediate can bind to DNA which may cause Genotoxicity.

Note that the biotransformation routes may differ based on the studied organism.

== Mechanism of action ==
MCT aggregates on and activates the calcium-sensing receptor (CaSR) of pulmonary artery endothelial cells to trigger endothelial damage and, ultimately, induces pulmonary hypertension. MCT binds to the extracellular domain of the CaSR (calcium-sensing receptor). Thereby, the assembly of CaSR is enhanced and triggers the mobilisation of calcium signalling, and damages pulmonary artery endothelial cells. In addition, MCT strengthens this effect by binding to the bone morphogenetic protein receptor type II (BMPR2), which is a transmembrane receptor. BMPR2 inhibition occurs which in turn induces a blockade of BMPR1 receptor activation via phosphorylation. Inhibiting this process disturbs cell differentiation processes and ossification. Interference with these receptors induce pulmonary arterial hypertension.

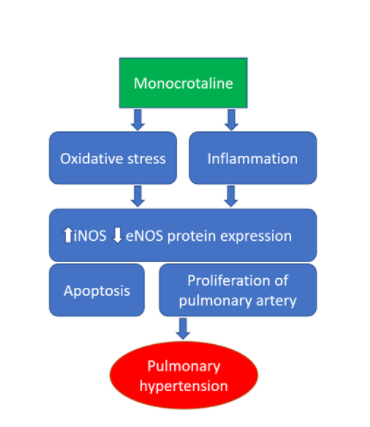
Monocrotaline: schematic mechanism of action.

MAPK is a mitogen activated protein kinase that gets activated upon BMPR2 activation. The protein kinase in turn phosphorylates p38 via a reinforced cascade of intracellular signals. It also activates p21 which has a regulating role in the cell cycle. However, MCT administration inhibits this process via a blockade of BMPR2. Cytokines such as TNF-α are released which cause activation of inflammation mechanisms, attracting neutrophils among others. Furthermore, inducible nitric oxide synthases (iNOS) are upregulated upon MCT induced cellular stress, whereas endothelial NOS (eNOS) gets downregulated. The cytokine TGF-β (also released by macrophages via chemotaxis during inflammation reactions in a positive feedback loop with TNF-α) is a transforming growth factor that is upregulated as a result of iNOS increase, contributing to pulmonary artery proliferation. Increased levels of iNOS also stimulate caspase-3 activity which increases apoptosis levels.

== See also ==
- Oxidative stress
