= Rattleweed =

Rattleweed is a common name for several plants and may refer to:

- Astragalus
- Baptisia arachnifera, native to the United States
- Clematis fremontii, found in the United States.
- Crotalaria retusa, native to tropical Asia, Africa, and Australia
- Senna covesii, native to the United States and Mexico

== See also ==
- Rattlebox
- Rattlebush
- Rattlepod
