= Rattlepod =

Rattlepod is a common name for several plants and may refer to:

- Crotalaria species
- Senna covesii
- Astragalus species

Rattlepod is also a common name for tiger moths of the genus Utetheisa, although the word "rattlepod" may not appear in common names at the species level.

== See also ==
- Rattlebox
- Rattlebush
- Rattleweed
