= Rattlebush =

Rattlebush is a common name for several plants in the legume family with inflated fruits in which the seeds may rattle:

- Baptisia
- Crotalaria
- Sesbania drummondii, native to the southeastern United States

== See also ==
- Rattlebox
- Rattlepod
- Rattleweed
