= Chochoyote =

Small ball of corn dough used in Mexican cuisine

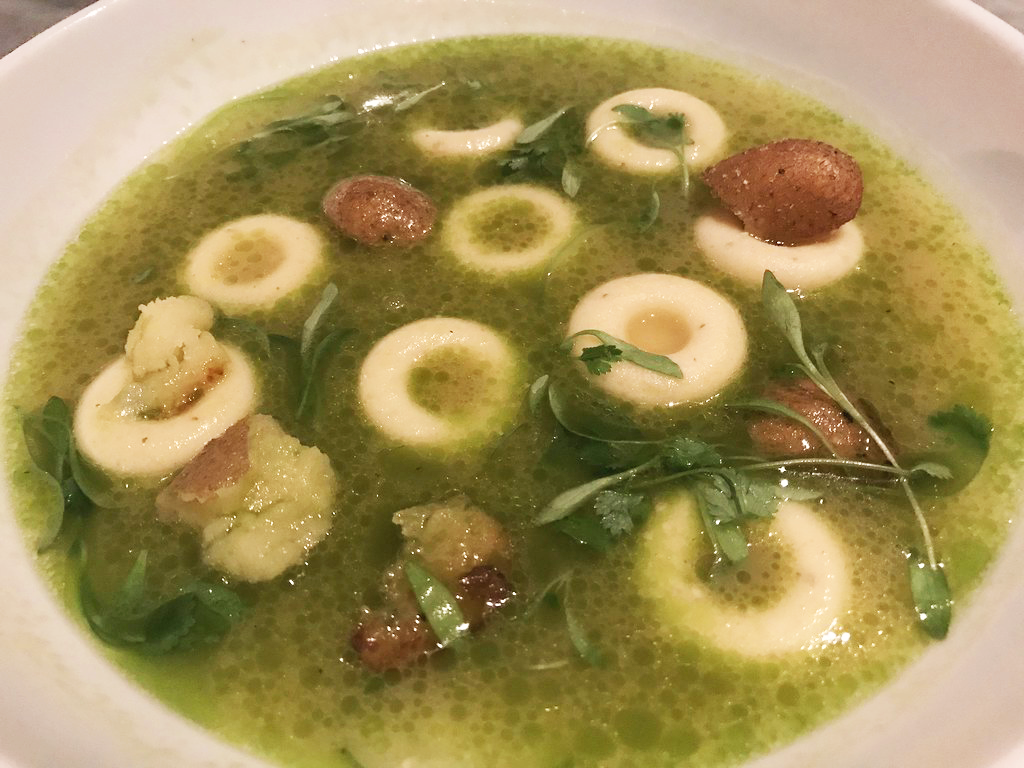
Chochoyotes soup

Chochoyote (also called chochoyota, chochoyo or chochoyón) is a small, round masa dumpling with a central dimple made by pressing a finger into the dough. The dumplings, which may be baked or boiled in broth, are commonly served with the dish mole amarillo from Oaxaca in southern Mexico.

== Preparation ==
Mix and knead one part of water and one part of corn flour to make the corn dough. Salt and lard are added. The lard helps to harden the dough and adds flavor. It is also frequently flavored with some herb, such as epazote, hoja santa, avocado leaf, cilantro, parsley or chipilín. With the hands, form small balls of 2 to 3 cm in diameter, flatten them slightly and with the finger make an indentation so that the dough cooks better. They are added raw to the stew, adding a lot of flavor and thickening it slightly.
