= Spermatophore =

Packet containing sperm in animal reproduction

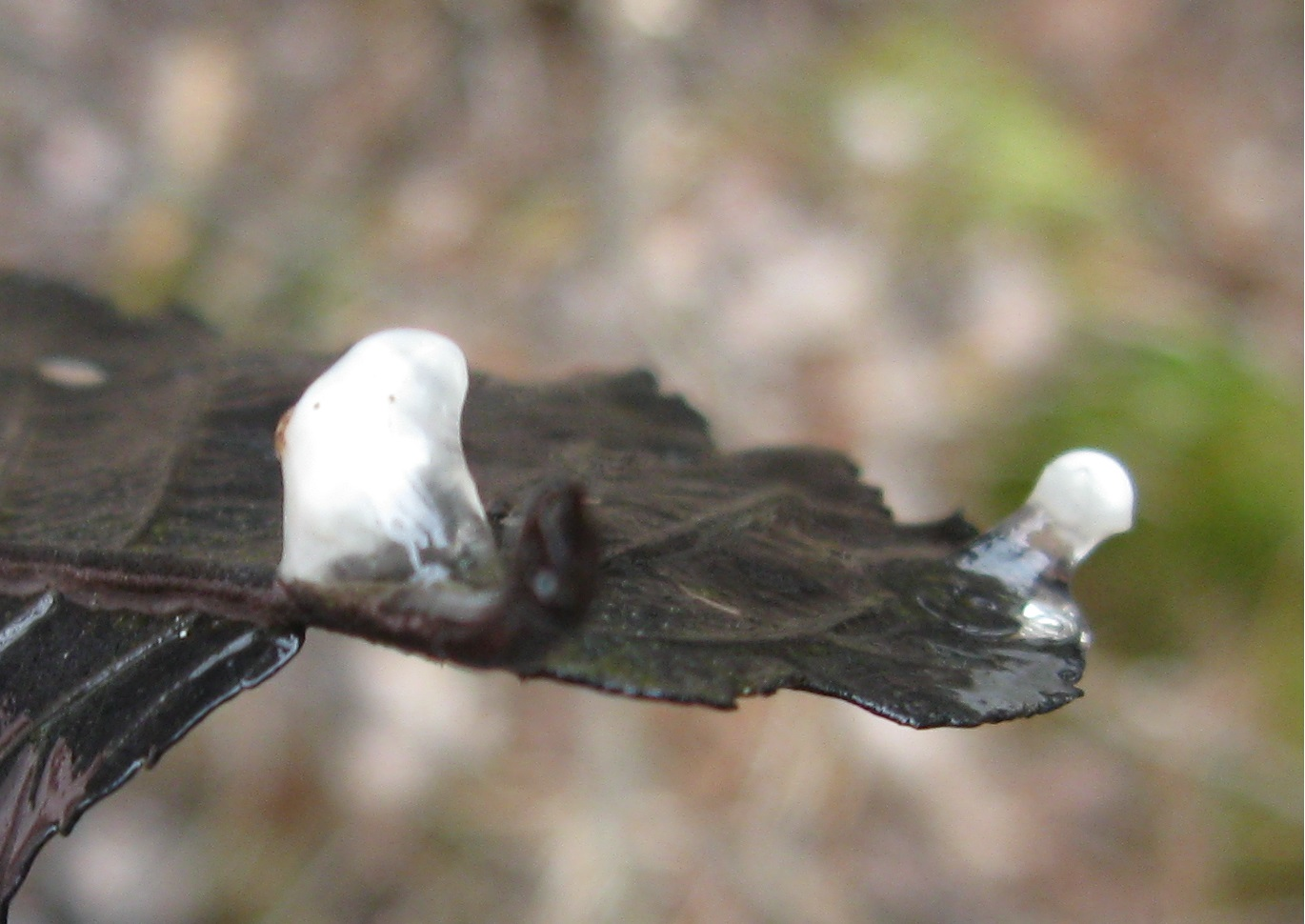
Spermatophores of a mole salamander

A spermatophore, from Ancient Greek σπέρμα (spérma), meaning "seed", and -φόρος (-phóros), meaning "bearing", or sperm ampulla is a capsule or mass containing spermatozoa created by males of various animal species, especially salamanders and arthropods, and transferred in entirety to the female's ovipore during reproduction. Spermatophores may additionally contain nourishment for the female, in which case it is called a nuptial gift, as in the instance of bush crickets. In the case of the toxic moth Utetheisa ornatrix, the spermatophore includes sperm, nutrients, and pyrrolizidine alkaloids which prevent predation because it is poisonous to most organisms. However, in some species such as the Edith's checkerspot butterfly, the "gift" provides little nutrient value. The weight of the spermatophore transferred at mating has little effect on female reproductive output.

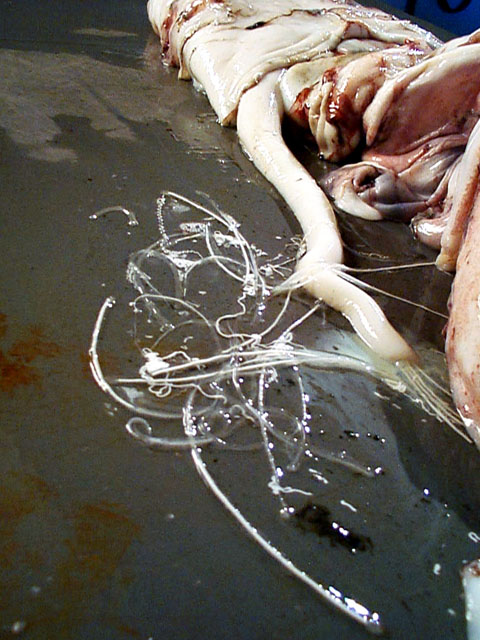
Giant squid spermatophores

== Arthropods ==
Spermatophores are the norm in arachnids and several soil arthropods. In various insects, such as bush crickets, the spermatophore is often surrounded by a proteinaceous spermatophylax. The function of the spermatophylax is to cause the female to relinquish some of her control over the insemination process allowing full sperm transfer from the spermatophore. Some species of butterflies and moths also deposit a spermatophore into the female during copulation. Examples include the speckled wood butterfly or the ornate moth, where males invest up to 10% of their body mass in creating a single spermatophore. Malaysian stalk-eyed flies also deposit a spermatophore into the female during copulation, but the spermatophore is very small in size and occupies only part of the female's vaginal capacity. This is likely an adaptation to the tendency towards high mating frequency in this species. These butterfly species have been known to use mud-puddling behavior, as demonstrated by Dryas iulia, to obtain the minerals needed in spermatophore production.

== Cephalopods ==
Most cephalopods use a specialized arm called the hectocotylus to deliver spermatophores to the female. The spermatophores of the giant Pacific octopus are about a meter (or yard) long. A complex hydraulic mechanism releases the sperm from the spermatophore, and it is stored internally by the female. In some cephalopods, like the argonaut octopus, the arm is detachable and capable of autonomous movement and prolonged survival inside the female, to the point that it was mistaken for a parasitic worm by George Cuvier, who gave the hectocotylus (Latin: "hundred" "hollow thing") its name. In some cases, spermatophores from multiple males might be present inside the same female simultaneously.

== Salamanders and newts ==
Males of most salamander and newt species create spermatophores, which the females may choose to take up or not, depending on the success of the male's mating display.

== See also ==
- Amblypygi § Reproduction
