= Rattlebox =

Rattlebox is a common name for several plants which have inflated fruits in which the seeds may rattle:

- Crotalaria
- Sesbania
- Rhinanthus

== See also ==
- Rattlebush
- Rattlepod
- Rattleweed
