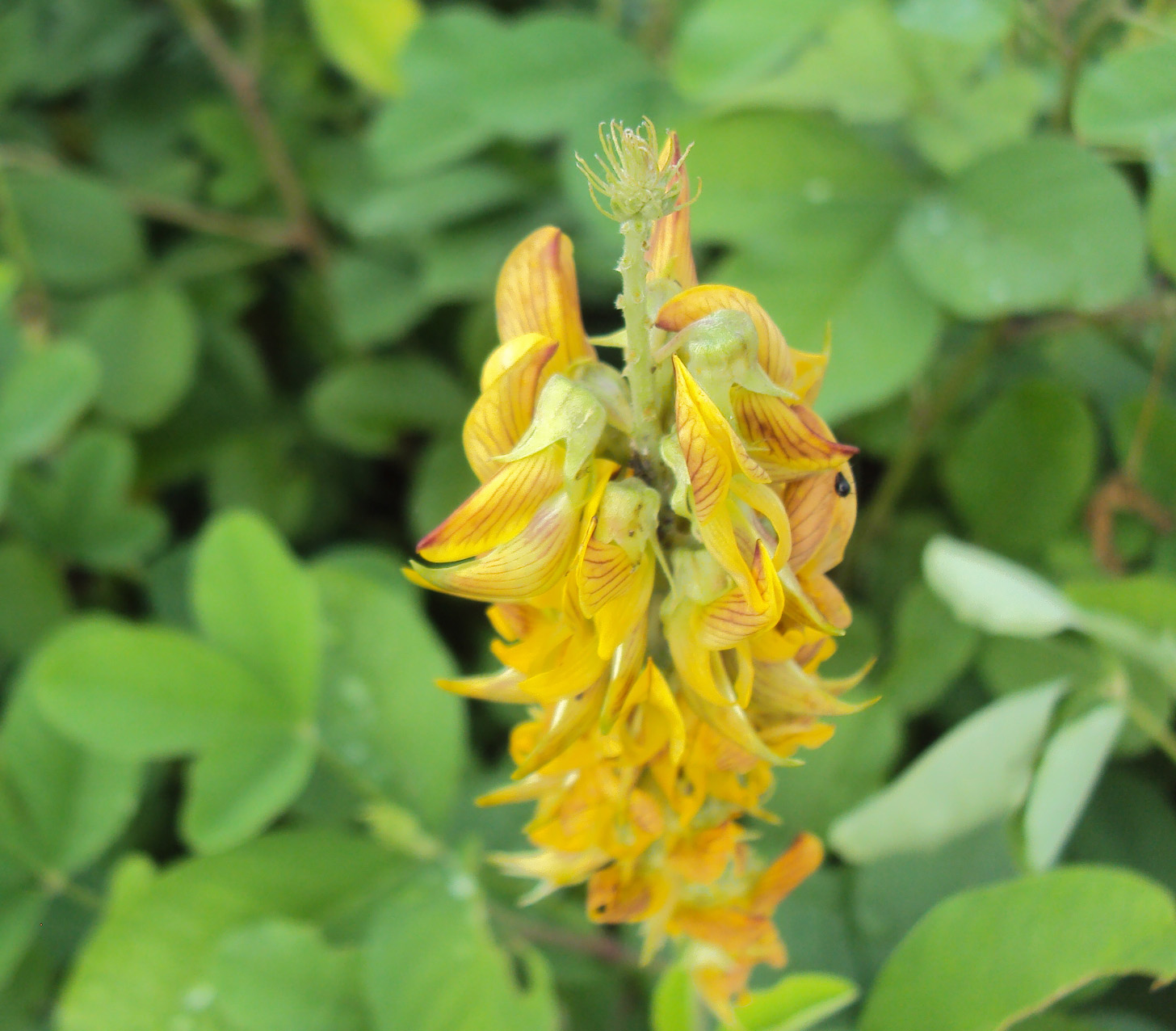
- Yellow flower of Crotalaria pallida

Scientific classification
- Kingdom: Plantae
- Clade: Tracheophytes
- Clade: Angiosperms
- Clade: Eudicots
- Clade: Rosids
- Order: Fabales
- Family: Fabaceae
- Subfamily: Faboideae
- Genus: Crotalaria
- Species: C. pallida

Binomial name
- Crotalaria pallida Aiton

= Crotalaria pallida =

Species of legume

Crotalaria pallida, commonly known as the smooth crotalaria, is a species of flowering plant within the family Fabaceae.

== Synonyms and common names ==
Synonyms are Crotalaria mucronata Desc, Crotalaria striata DC, Crotalaria falcata VAHL ex DC, Crotalaria brownei DC., Crotalaria fertilis Delile, Crotalaria hookeri Arn., Crotalaria pisiformis Guill. & Perr., Crotalaria siamica F.N.Williams, Crotalaria striata var. acutifolia Trin., Crotalaria tinctoria Baill, Crotalaria zuccarininana D.Dietr. The preferred common name is crotalaria, with other common names including striped rattlepod and crotalaire striée.

== Description ==
This shrub (annual or short-lived perennial herb) has height of about 1.5 m. The stout stem is hairy and has longitudinal grooves. Leaves are trifoliate with a 2–8.5 cm long petiole, leaflets 3-13 x 2–5 cm and elliptical to obovate. Flowers are yellow, often reddish-brown veined and borne on 15–40 cm long racemes, each with 20-30 flowers. Fruits are 3-5 x 0.6-0.8 cm, 30-40 seeded that are heart-shaped, 3 x 2 mm, shiny, mottled ochre and dark grey-green or brown.

== Distribution ==
Crotalaria pallida is found in Indonesia, Sudan, United States (Florida, Puerto Rico), Brazil, India, and Bangladesh

== Uses ==
The plant is grown as a ground cover and a green manure crop, especially in the inter-rows of rubber trees and coconut palms. Flowers are eaten as a vegetable in Cambodia, where the seeds are roasted and grounded for use as a sort of coffee beverage. The roots are sometimes chewed with betel nuts in Vietnam. In traditional medicine, the plant is used to treat urinary problems and fever, a poultice of the roots is applied to swelling of joints and an extract of the leaves is taken to expel intestinal worms.

Crotalaria mucronata Desv was reported to be widely used in the southern part of the US as a green manure crop under the name “giant striata”.
