= Retrorsine =

Names
- IUPAC name (1R,4Z,6R,7S,17R)-4-ethylidene-7-hydroxy-7-(hydroxymethyl)-6-methyl-2,9-dioxa-14-azatricyclo[9.5.1.0^{14,17}]heptadec-11-ene-3,8-dione
- Other names Retrorsin β-Longilobine

Identifiers
CAS Number	480-54-6; 36168-23-7 (hydrochloride)
3D model (JSmol)	Interactive image
ChEBI	CHEBI:8822
ChEMBL	ChEMBL496894
ChemSpider	13076866
ECHA InfoCard	100.119.898
KEGG	C10364
PubChem CID	5281743
UNII	XJ86XWL8IY
CompTox Dashboard (EPA)	DTXSID6021242
- InChI: InChI=1S/C18H25NO6/c1-3-12-8-11(2)18(23,10-20)17(22)24-9-13-4-6-19-7-5-14(15(13)19)25-16(12)21/h3-4,11,14-15,20,23H,5-10H2,1-2H3/b12-3-/t11-,14-,15-,18-/m1/s1 Key: BCJMNZRQJAVDLD-CQRYIUNCSA-N
- SMILES: C/C=C\1/C[C@H]([C@@](C(=O)OCC2=CCN3[C@H]2[C@@H](CC3)OC1=O)(CO)O)C

Properties
Chemical formula	C_{18}H_{25}NO_{6}
Molar mass	351.399 g·mol^{−1}
Appearance	Colorless prisms
Density	1.38 g/cm^{3}
Melting point	212 °C (414 °F; 485 K)
Solubility	Soluble in chloroform Slightly soluble in acetone, ethanol, water

Hazards
- GHS labelling
Pictograms	(GHS06: Toxic)
Signal word	Danger
Hazard statements	H300
Precautionary statements	P264, P270, P301+P316, P321, P330, P405, P501
- Except where otherwise noted, data are given for materials in their standard state (at 25 °C [77 °F], 100 kPa). Infobox references

Retrorsine (RTS or RS) is a naturally occurring pyrrolizidine alkaloid primarily found in plants of the genus Senecio. It was first isolated from the plant Senecio retrorsus and named by the Canadian chemist Richard Manske in 1931. Known for its potent hepatotoxicity (one of the most potent liver toxin among pyrrolizidine alkaloids) and carcinogenicity, it is a significant plant toxin affecting livestock and humans through contaminated feed and herbal products.

In biomedical research, retrorsine is used to induce selective liver injury in animal models to study liver regeneration and liver transplantation, due to its ability to block the cell cycle of host hepatocytes without killing them immediately, such as the retrorsine/partial hepatectomy (RS/PH) model.
