= Pyrrolizidine alkaloid =

Class of chemical compounds

Skeletal formula of retronecine, a pyrrolizidine alkaloid found in the common groundsel (Senecio vulgaris) and comfrey (Symphytum spp.)

Pyrrolizidine alkaloids (PAs), sometimes referred to as necine bases, are a group of naturally occurring alkaloids based on the structure of pyrrolizidine. Their use dates back centuries and is intertwined with the discovery, understanding, and eventual recognition of their toxicity on humans and other animals.

== History ==
PAs were first discovered in plants in the 19th century, but their toxic effects were not immediately recognized. Instead, many PA-containing plants were traditionally used for medicinal purposes in various cultures around the world. For example, herbs containing PAs were used in traditional Chinese medicine and by Native American tribes for their purported therapeutic properties. It has been estimated that 3% of the world's flowering plants contain pyrrolizidine alkaloids. Honey can contain pyrrolizidine alkaloids, as can grains, milk, offal and eggs. To date (2011), there is no international regulation of PAs in food, unlike those for herbs and medicines.

In the early to mid-20th century, researchers began to observe and document cases of livestock poisoning linked to the consumption of PA-containing plants. These observations led to the recognition of PAs as potent hepatotoxic and genotoxic compounds.

In response to growing concerns about PA exposure, regulatory agencies around the world began to establish guidelines and regulations to limit PA levels in food, herbal products, and animal feed. These regulations aim to protect human and animal health by minimizing PA exposure and mitigating the risk of toxicity.

Despite regulatory efforts, the issue of PA exposure remains relevant today. Ongoing research continues to explore various aspects of PA toxicity, including the identification of new PA-containing plants, the development of sensitive analytical methods, and the assessment of human health risks associated with PA exposure. Additionally, efforts to raise awareness among healthcare professionals, herbal product manufacturers, and the general public about the risks of PA exposure are ongoing.

== Natural occurrence ==
PAs are a group of naturally occurring compounds found in a wide range of plant species. These alkaloids are secondary metabolites synthesized by plants primarily as a defense mechanism against herbivores, insects, and pathogens.

The biosynthesis of PAs was discovered to occur through the first pathway-specific enzyme homospermidine synthase.

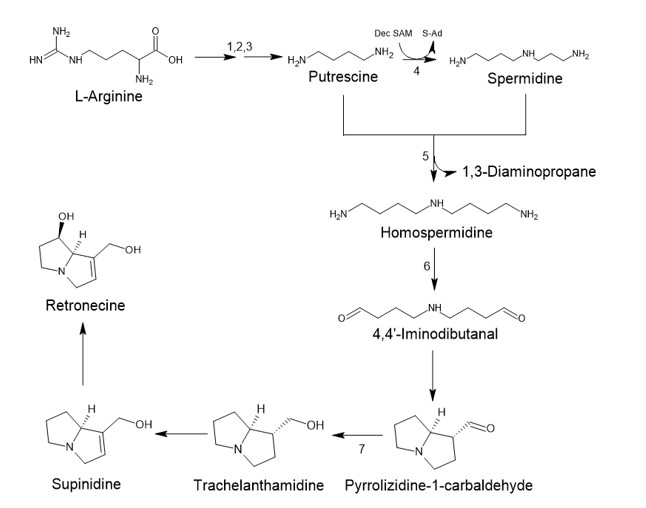
Biosynthesis of PAs

The polyamines putrescine and spermidine are derived from the basic amino acid arginine. Subsequently, homospermidine synthase exchanges the 1,3-diaminopropane by putrescine and forms symmetric homospermidine. Oxidation of homospermidine by copper-dependent diamine oxidases initiates cyclization to pyrrolizidine-1-carbaldehyde, which is reduced, to 1-hydroxymethylpyrrolizidine. Desaturation and hydroxylation ultimately form retronecine, which is acylated with an activated necic acid, for instance with senecyl-CoA2 as in the example shown below.

PAs are preferably found in the plant families Asteraceae (tribes Eupatorieae and Senecioneae), Boraginaceae (many genera), Fabaceae (mainly the genus Crotalaria), and Orchidaceae (nine genera). More than 95% of the PA-containing species investigated thus far belong to these four families.

== Structure and reactivity ==
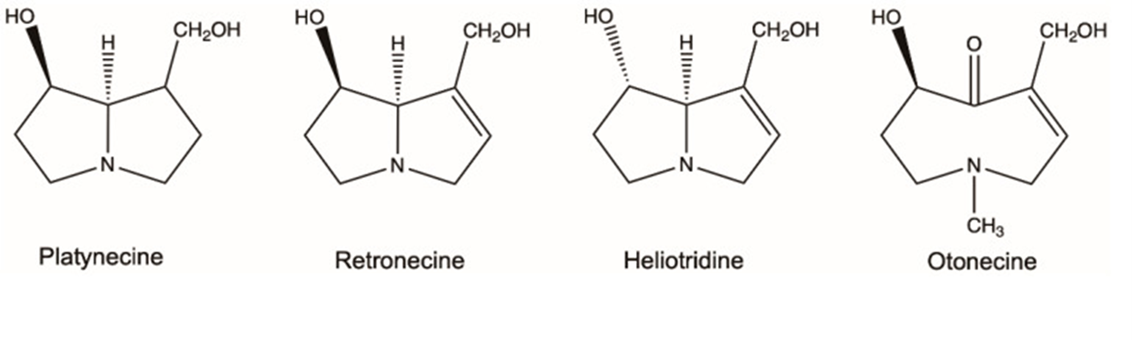
Chemical structures of the necine bases

PAs are compounds made up of a necine base, a double five-membered ring with a nitrogen atom in the middle, and one or two carboxylic esters called necic acids. Four major necine bases are described, with retronecine and its enantiomer heliotridine being the largest group, and highly toxic. Another group is the platynecine, the difference between these groups is its saturated base, which makes it less toxic. Most bases have a 1,2-unsaturated base. Another difference in the groups is with otonecine, which cannot form N-oxides, due to the methylation of the nitrogen atom.

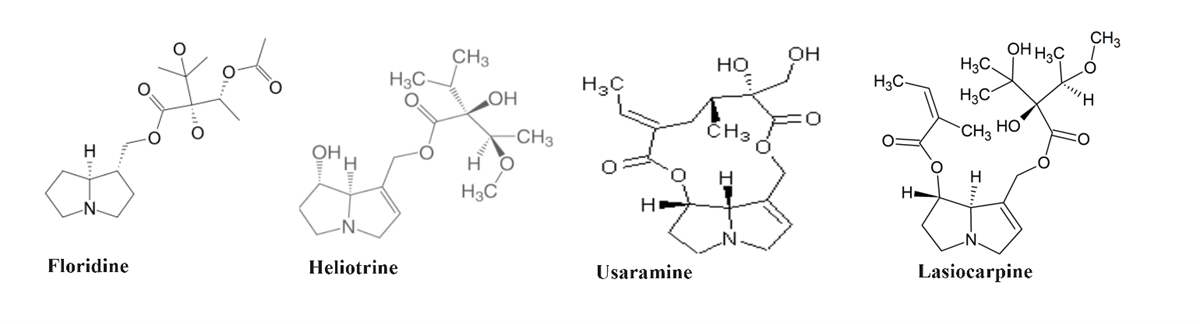
Chemical structures of various PAs

The alcohol groups on the necine bases can make esters in a wide variety of forms. Among the possibilities are mono-esters, like Floridine and Heliotrine, and di-esters either with an open or closed ring structure, like Usaramine and Lasiocarpine. In total more than 660 PAs and PA N-oxides have been identified in over 6000 plants.

== Synthesis ==
There are multiple ways to synthesize PAs and their derivatives. A flexible strategy would be to start with a Boc (tert-butoxycarbonyl) protected pyrrole molecule and use specific reaction for synthesis into the desired compound.

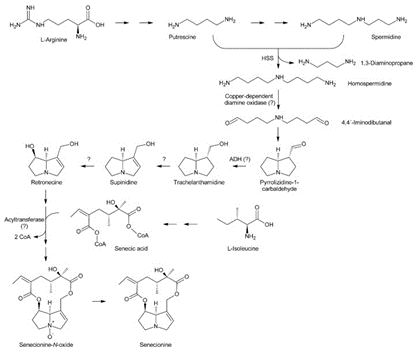
A general strategy for the production of pyrrolizidine alkaloids is described, starting from intermediate (+)−9. The key features are diastereoselective dihydroxylation, inversion at the ring junction by hydroboration of an enamine, and ring closure to form the bicyclo ring system.

== Mechanisms of actions and metabolism ==
PAs are commonly introduced into the body via oral ingestion through contaminated food or traditional medicine, notably borage leaf, comfrey and coltsfoot. It can readily form salts with nitrates, chlorides and sulphates, which facilitate the uptake in the gastrointestinal tract. After which they travel to the liver via the portal vein.

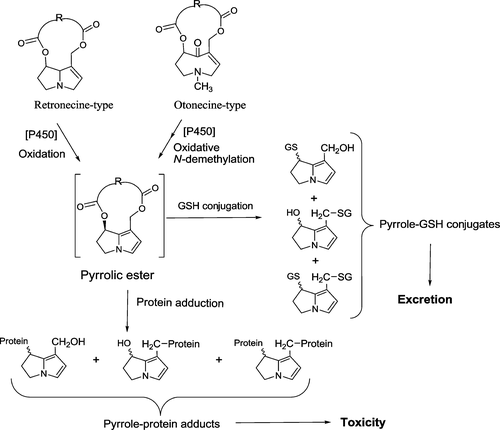
Proposed hepatic metabolic activation of retronecine-type and otonecine-type PAs to form pyrrolic esters, which further interact with glutathione or proteins to generate pyrrole–GSH conjugates or pyrrole–protein adducts, respectively.

Metabolites form mostly in the liver. Here esterases can hydrolyze the PAs to reduce the compound into its necine acids and bases, both forms are non-toxic for humans and do not damage the body. However, cytochrome P450 (CYP450) also metabolizes PAs, this enzyme can form pyrrolic esters (EPy), these are hepatotoxic due to their high reactivity. The EPy can also be hydrolyzed into alcoholic pyrroles, which are mutagenic and carcinogenic.

Since this mostly happens in the liver, this is the most affected organ. Other affected organs are the lungs and kidneys. The EPy can escape the liver, and travel through the Disse space into the bloodstream.

The electrophilic nature of pyrroles makes them an easy target for nucleophilic attack from nucleic acids and protein. If bound by glutathione they can become a non-toxic conjugate and be excreted via the kidneys.

A second detoxifying pathway is the formation of the N-oxide In the liver and lungs of certain mammal species enzymes called monooxygenase can prevent aromatization of the double 5-ring and in turn prevent the formation of the pyrrole-protein adduct.

== Toxicological effects ==
The toxicity consequences resulting from the metabolism of PAs in humans primarily revolve around hepatotoxicity and genotoxicity.

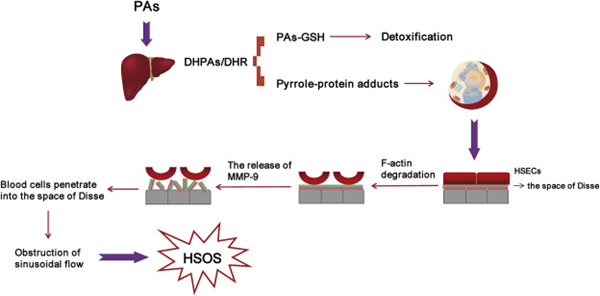
Pathogenesis of PA-induced HSOS

PAs are metabolized in the liver through CYP450-mediated pathways. This metabolic process leads to the formation of reactive intermediates, such as pyrrolic metabolites, which can covalently bind to proteins in the liver, forming pyrrole-protein adducts. These adducts impair the function of essential liver proteins, leading to hepatotoxicity. The severity of liver damage correlates with the level of pyrrole-protein adduct formation. Hepatotoxicity induced by PAs can manifest as liver injury, inflammation, necrosis, HSOS (Hepatic Sinusoidal Obstruction Syndrome) and even liver failure in severe cases. The pathogenesis of PAs-induces HSOS is shown by Xu.

Genotoxicity is another consequence of PA metabolism. The reactive metabolites formed during PA metabolism can also bind to DNA, leading to the formation of DNA adducts. These adducts can induce mutations and DNA damage, increasing the risk of cancer development and other adverse health effects. Genotoxicity is particularly concerning as it can lead to long-term health consequences, including carcinogenesis.

The toxicity of PA metabolites can vary depending on the specific PA compound and its chemical structure. Different PAs may undergo metabolic activation to varying degrees, resulting in differences in toxicity. For example, retronecine-type PAs like monocrotaline are known to be highly hepatotoxic, while other types may exhibit lower toxicity or different toxicological profiles.

== Pharmacological effects ==
Next to its toxicological effects, PAs have long been researched for their potential beneficial effects. Traditional medicinal plants have long been known to contain PAs, the exact effect of the PAs regarding beneficial effect of the plants is debated. Among these traditional medicines is the root of Ligularia achyrotricha of Tibet. Several pharmacological effects have been found. Among these effects are antimicrobial activity, antiviral activity and antineoplastic activity, acetylcholinesterase inhibition, and gastric ulcers treatment.

Antimicrobial activity of several PAs have been identified as having mild to strong effect against bacteria: E. coli and P. chrysogenum. In particular Lasiocarpine and 7-angeloyl heliotrine were found to have significant activity against these microbes. Derivatives of PAs have been found to induce cell death in these bacteria by attacking bacterial cell membranes. Retronecine derivatives have been found slow the growth rate of several strains of the fungus Fusarium oxysporum.

Antiviral activity has been found in haliotridine derivates. However, effects are not consistent across PA compounds, derivates significantly differ in activity between different viral pathogens. As a result, it is difficult to determine an exact PA with an effect on a specific virus. Several PAs have been found with significant inhibition of growth in the following viruses: coxsackie, poliomyelitis, measles, and vesicular stomatitis.

Antineoplastic activity, specifically against leukemia, has been found in retronecine derivatives such as indicine. A 1984 study by L. Letendre treated 22 leukaemia patients with indicine, this resulted in a significant observed antineoplastic response with four complete remissions and five partial remissions. An adverse side effect of the treatment was observed in 5 patients who died of hepatic toxicity likely caused by the medication. Two different dose levels were tested on children: 2 g/m2/ day for 5 consecutive days (14 patients) and 2,5 g/m2/ day for 5 consecutive days (17 patients). Therapeutic effect was determined based on these doses and deemed to have a limited antileukemic effect below a dose of 3 g/m2/ day. However, this study also found severe hepatotoxic responses to be common at these doses.

Four known PAs, 7-O-angeloyllycopsamine N-oxide, echimidine N-oxide, echimidine, and 7-O-angeloylretronecine have been clinically shown to inhibit acetylcholinesterase (AChE) . AChE inhibitors have been used as one of the treatments for Alzheimer's disease. The effect of these compounds was significant in the reduction of AChE production and thus a potential alternative in the fight against Alzheimer's.

PAs like senecionine, integerrimine, retrorsine, usaramine and seneciphylline have been shown to cause an increase in both the levels of gastrin and the expression of epidermal growth factor (EGF). These two compounds aid in the repair of the stomach after gastric ulcers. A high concentration of said compounds can reduce lesions in the stomach. This may aid in treatment after operation to the stomach.

=== Effects on animals ===
The toxicological effects of PAs have been studied on animals. Retronecine derivatives are known to cause a toxic response in the livers of livestock like cows. Symptoms tend to start with a change in rough hair coat and depression. When pregnant livestock is exposed to PAs an effect can be seen on the foetus, mainly stillbirth and accumulation in the foetus. The main lethal responses in adult livestock exhibit necrosis, HSOS and megalocytosis. Additional to the short-term effect PAs have been found to lead to carcinogenic growths on the long term. The carcinogenic effect is caused by formation of DNA adducts, because of metabolic reactions. No minimum dosage for the carcinogenic effect is currently known. However, there have been studies to determine the lowest dose for an adverse effect, also known as LOAEL. LOAEL and LD_{50} (oral) for 40 PAs have been experimentally found out. These values can be seen in the Table below. The found low LD_{50} values clearly show the relatively high toxicity of PAs, however no significant relation was found between the LD_{50} and LOAEL.

Recorded LD_{50} and LOAEL values
Type	Compound	LD50 (g/kg)	LOAEL (g/kg)
Retronecine types	Retrorsine∗	0.320	0.001
Retronecine types	Clivorine	0.386	0.002
Retronecine types	Riddelliine	0.616	0.015
Retronecine types	Senecionine	0.127	0.001
Retronecine types	Usaramine	0.264	0.002
Retronecine types	Jacobine	0.461	0.003
Retronecine types	Monocrotaline∗	0.731	0.002
Retronecine types	Seneciphylline	0.264	0.002
Retronecine types	Integerrimine	0.254	0.002
Retronecine types	Senecivernine	0.592	0.004
Retronecine types	Jacoline	0.230	0.001
Retronecine types	Trichodesmine	0.324	0.004
Retronecine types	Fulvine	0.369	0.002
Retronecine types	Angularine	0.559	0.009
Retronecine types	Crotananine	0.592	0.004
Retronecine types	7-Acetylintermedine	0.559	0.009
Retronecine types	7-Acetyllycopsamine	0.356	0.003
Retronecine types	Echimidine	0.616	0.015
Retronecine types	Echiumine	0.122	0.001
Retronecine types	Lycopsamine	0.239	0.001
Retronecine types	Intermedine	0.264	0.002
Retronecine types	Indicine	0.264	0.002
Retronecine types	Retronecine∗	0.242	0.001
Retronecine types	Lasiocarpine	0.555	0.001
Retronecine types	Heliosupine	0.708	0.002
Retronecine types	Heleurine	0.616	0.015
Retronecine types	Supinine	0.215	0.001
Retronecine types	Callimorphine	0.559	0.009
Retronecine types	Heliotrine	0.056	0.001
Retronecine types	Echinatine	0.250	0.003
Retronecine types	Rinderine	0.486	0.001
Platynecine types	Platyphylline∗	0.443	0.002
Platynecine types	Trachelanthamine	0.391	0.001
Platynecine types	Heliocoromandaline	0.246	0.004
Platynecine types	Heliocurassavicine	0.404	0.001
Otonicine types	Acetylanonamine	0.230	0.001
Otonicine types	Senkirkine	0.275	0.001
Otonicine types	Otosenine	0.106	0.001
Otonicine types	Petasitenine	0.264	0.002
Otonicine types	Otonecine	0.467	0.001

PAs are also used as a defense mechanism by some organisms such as Utetheisa ornatrix. Utetheisa ornatrix caterpillars obtain these toxins from their food plants and use them as a deterrent for predators. PAs protect them from most of their natural enemies. The toxins stay in these organisms even when they metamorphose into adult moths, continuing to protect them throughout their adult stage.

== Plant species containing pyrrolizidine alkaloids ==
This is a dynamic list and may never be able to satisfy particular standards for completeness. You can help by adding missing items with reliable sources

- Adenostyles alliariae
- Adenostyles glabra
- Ageratum conyzoides
- Ageratum houstonianum
- Anchusa officinalis
- Arnebia euchroma
- Borago officinalis
- Cacalia hastata
- Cacalia hupehensis
- Chromolaena odorata
- Cordia myxa
- Crassocephalum crepidioides
- Crotalaria albida
- Crotalaria assamica
- Crotalaria crispat
- Crotalaria dura
- Crotalaria globifera
- Crotalaria mucronata
- Crotalaria sesseliflora
- Crotalaria spectabilis
- Crotalaria tetragona
- Crotalaria retusa
- Cynoglossum amabile
- Cynoglossum lanceolatum
- Cynoglossum officinale
- Cynoglossum zeylanicum
- Echium plantagineum
- Echium vulgare
- Emilia sonchifolia
- Eupatorium cannabinum
- Eupatorium chinense
- Eupatorium fortunei
- Eupatorium japonicum
- Eupatorium perfoliatum
- Eupatorium purpureum
- Farfugium japonicum
- Gynura bicolor
- Gynura divaricata
- Gynura segetum
- Heliotropium amplexicaule
- Heliotropium europaeum
- Heliotropium indicum
- Heliotropium popovii
- Lappula intermedia
- Ligularia cymbulifera
- Ligularia dentata
- Ligularia duiformis
- Ligularia heterophylla
- Ligularia hodgsonii
- Ligularia intermedia
- Ligularia lapathifolia
- Ligularia lidjiangensis
- Ligularia platyglossa
- Ligularia tongolensis
- Ligularia tsanchanensis
- Ligularia vellerea
- Liparis nervosa
- Lithospermum erythrorhizon
- Neurolaena lobata
- Petasites japonicus
- Senecio alpinus
- Senecio argunensis
- Senecio brasiliensis
- Senecio chrysanthemoides
- Senecio cineraria
- Senecio glabellus
- Senecio integrifolius var. fauriri
- Senecio interggerrimus
- Senecio jacobaea
- Senecio lautus
- Senecio linearifolius
- Senecio madagascariensis
- Senecio nemorensis
- Senecio quadridentatus
- Senecio riddelli
- Senecio scandens
- Senecio vulgaris
- Syneilesis aconitifolia
- Symphytum officinale
- Tussilago farfara

== See also ==
- Coremata or hair-pencils, extensible structures found on the rear of the abdomen of some male lepidopterans, used to release pheromones. The size and efficacy of an individual's corema depends on the availability of pyrrolizidine alkaloids in their diet.
