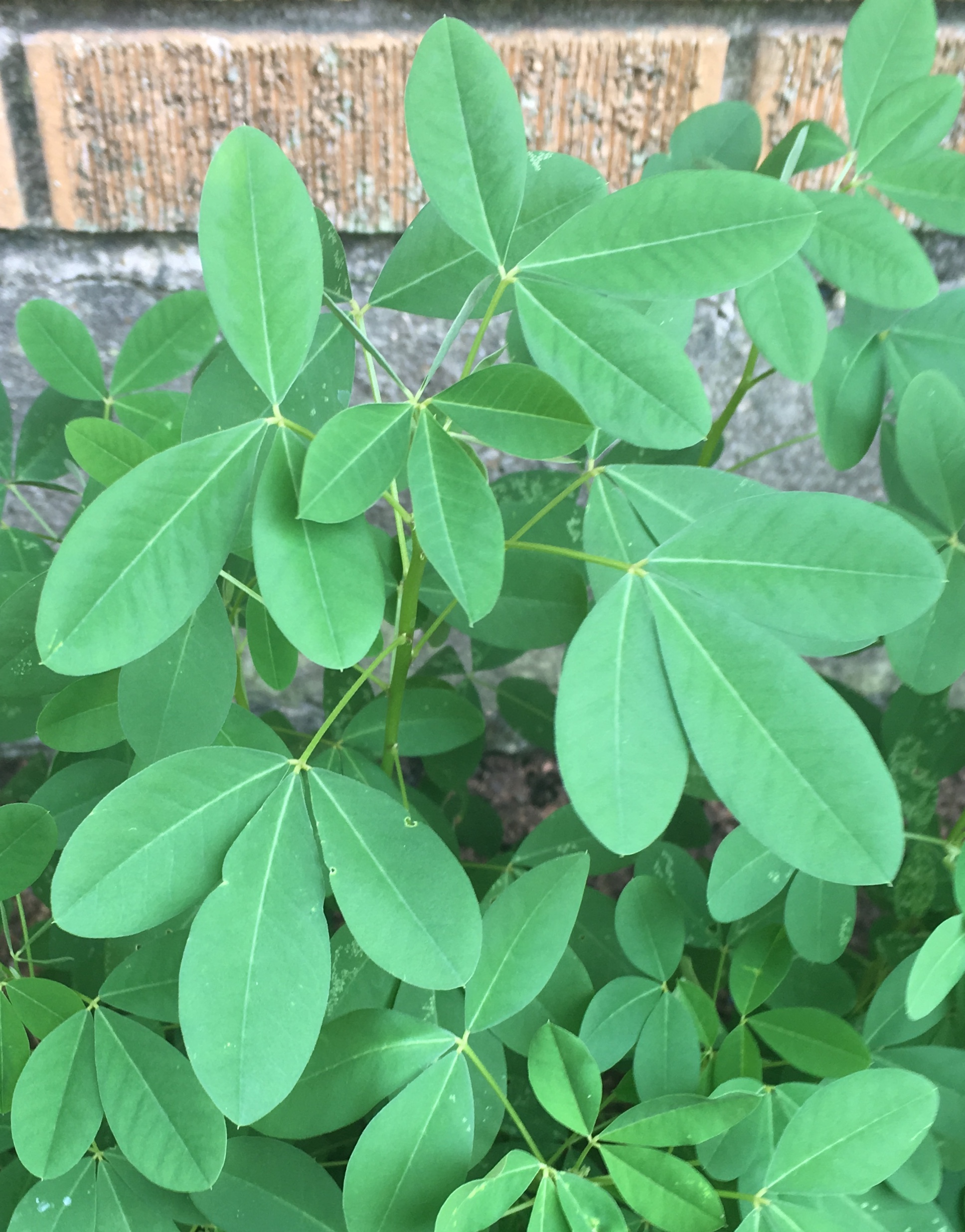

Conservation status
- Least Concern (IUCN 3.1)

Scientific classification
- Kingdom: Plantae
- Clade: Tracheophytes
- Clade: Angiosperms
- Clade: Eudicots
- Clade: Rosids
- Order: Fabales
- Family: Fabaceae
- Subfamily: Faboideae
- Genus: Crotalaria
- Species: C. longirostrata

Binomial name
- Crotalaria longirostrata Hook. & Arn. (1838)

= Crotalaria longirostrata =

Species of flowering plant

Crotalaria longirostrata, the chipilín, is a perennial legume that is native to Mexico and Central America. Other common names include chepil, chepilin, chipilin and longbeak rattlebox.

== Description ==
Chipilín leaves are a common leafy vegetable in the local cuisines of southern Mexico, including Chiapas, Oaxaca, and Tabasco, and Central America, especially El Salvador, Honduras and Guatemala. The leaves are high in iron, calcium, magnesium, and beta carotene. They can be boiled and served green, dried and used as an herb, or added to tamale doughs for color and flavor.

When the pods of the plant dry, they dehisce (split open), spreading the seeds over a wide area. That, combined with the fact that the plant is not eaten by animals, has given chipilín the reputation of an invasive plant. In the continental United States, chipilín is characterized as a noxious weed, perhaps because other members of the genus Crotalaria are toxic to cattle. The importation of chipilín seeds or plants is banned in Australia. Introduced populations exist on the island of Maui in Hawaii.
