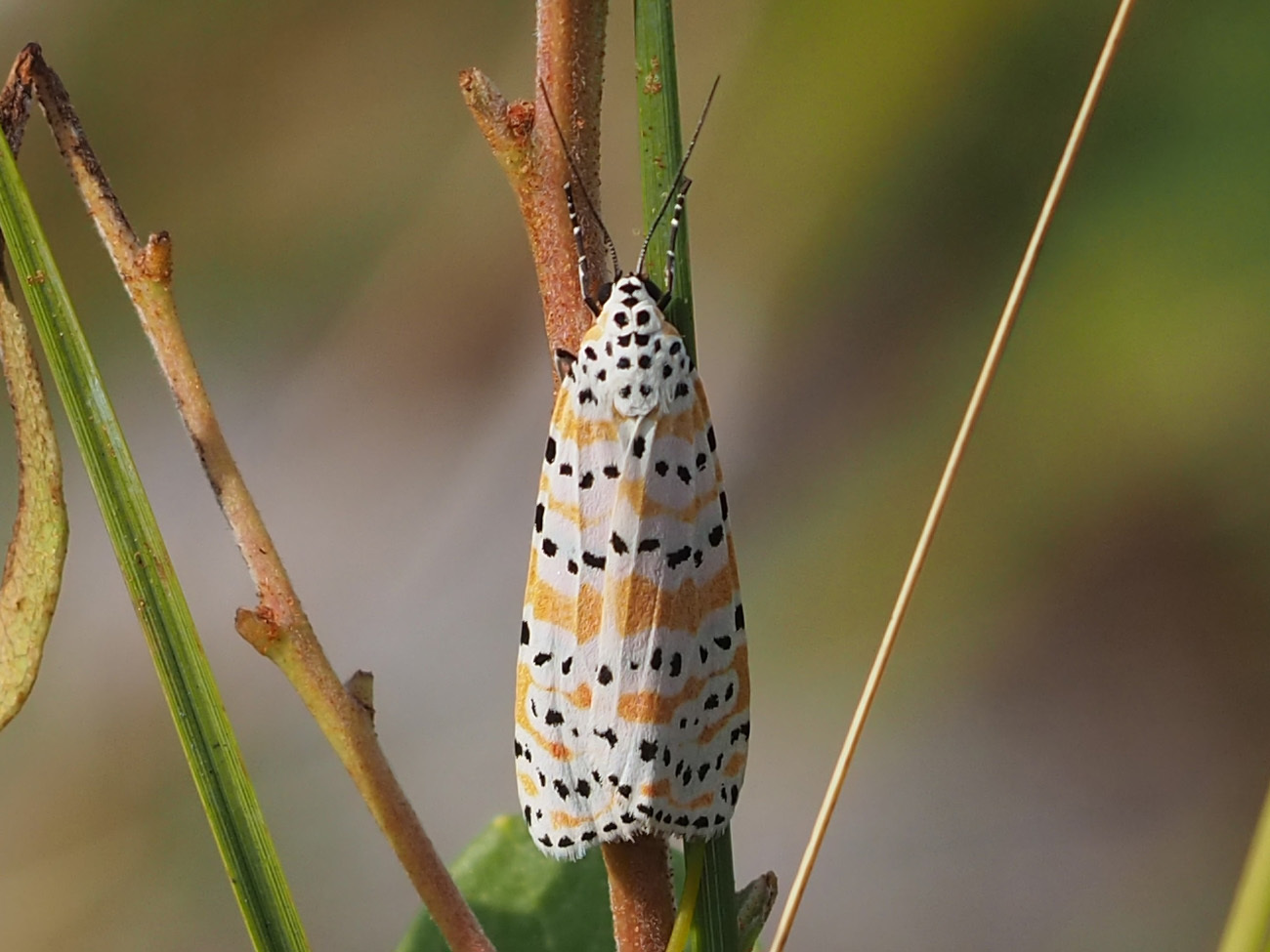

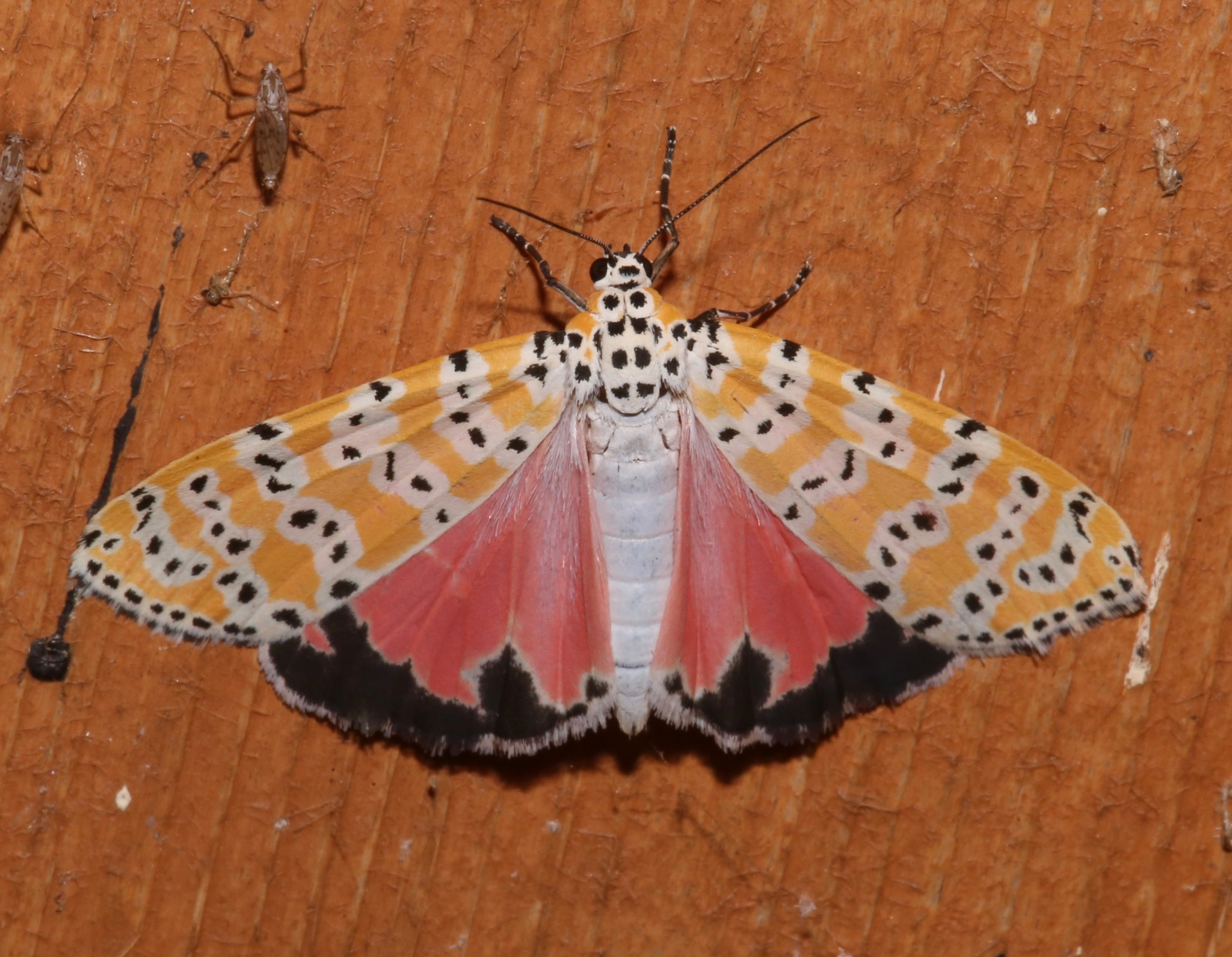

Scientific classification
- Kingdom: Animalia
- Phylum: Arthropoda
- Clade: Pancrustacea
- Class: Insecta
- Order: Lepidoptera
- Superfamily: Noctuoidea
- Family: Erebidae
- Subfamily: Arctiinae
- Tribe: Arctiini
- Subtribe: Callimorphina
- Genus: Utetheisa
- Species: U. ornatrix

Binomial name
- Utetheisa ornatrix (Linnaeus, 1758)

Synonyms
- Phalaena ornatrix Linnaeus, 1758; Utetheisa bella (Linnaeus, 1758); Deiopeia ornatrix var. stretchii Butler, 1877; Deiopeia pura Butler, 1877; Deiopeia ornatrix var. daphoena Dyar, 1914; Deiopeia ornatrix var. butleri Dyar, 1914; Phalaena Tinea bella Linnaeus, 1758; Euprepia venusta Dalman, 1823; Deiopeia speciosa Walker, 1854; Deiopeia ornatrix var. hybrida Butler, 1877; Deiopeia bella var. intermedia Butler, 1877; Utetheisa bella var. terminalis Neumoegen & Dyar, 1893; Utetheisa nova J.B.Smith, 1910

= Utetheisa ornatrix =

Species of moth

Utetheisa ornatrix, also called the ornate bella moth, ornate moth, bella moth or rattlebox moth, is a moth of the subfamily Arctiinae. It is aposematically colored ranging from pink, red, orange and yellow to white coloration with black markings arranged in varying patterns on its wings. It has a wingspan of 33–46 mm. Moths reside in temperate midwestern and eastern North America as well as throughout Mexico and other parts of Central America. Unlike most moths, the bella moth is diurnal. Formerly, the bella moth or beautiful utetheisa of temperate eastern North America was separated as Utetheisa bella. Now it is united with the bella moth in Utetheisa ornatrix.

The larvae usually feed on Crotalaria species, which contain poisonous alkaloid compounds that render them unpalatable to most predators. Larvae may prey on other bella moth larvae in order to compensate for any alkaloid deficiency.

The bella moth also demonstrates complex mating strategies and is thus an excellent model to study sexual selection. Females mate multiply and receive spermatophores containing sperm, nutrients and alkaloid compounds from numerous males as nuptial gifts. Females choose males according to the intensity of a courtship pheromone, hydroxydanaidal, and carry out a sperm selection process after copulation with various males.

== Distribution ==
Utetheisa ornatrix is found from southeastern United States to South America (southeast Brazil). In the southeastern United States, its distribution ranges from Connecticut westward to southeastern Nebraska and southward to southern New Mexico and Florida. This species is found to be more common in more tropical parts of this range, in accordance to the availability of its host plant in more southern regions. It is also found throughout Mexico, South America, and Central America.

== Taxonomy ==
In 1758, Carl Linnaeus first characterized two species of the genus Phalaena. Phalaena ornatrix was used to describe the paler moth specimens, and Utetheisa bella, described the bright pink moth specimens. In 1819, Hübner moved these species to a new genus, Utetheisa. For nearly a century, it was difficult to determine this moth's evolutionary history as researchers focused on external similarities (color, shape, patterns, size), rather than determining features specific to the species. This led to great confusion when trying to categorize the different subspecies. In 1960, Forbes combined both species, Utetheisa ornatrix and Utetheisa bella, into the species now known as Utetheisa ornatrix. His conclusion was also supported by Pease Jr. who, in 1966, used genetic testing and determined that any phenotypic differences were based on interspecific variation due to geographic differences (rather than intraspecific variation).

=== Subspecies ===
- Utetheisa ornatrix ornatrix
- Utetheisa ornatrix bella (Linnaeus, 1758)
- Utetheisa ornatrix saintcroixensis Pease, 1973

== Description ==
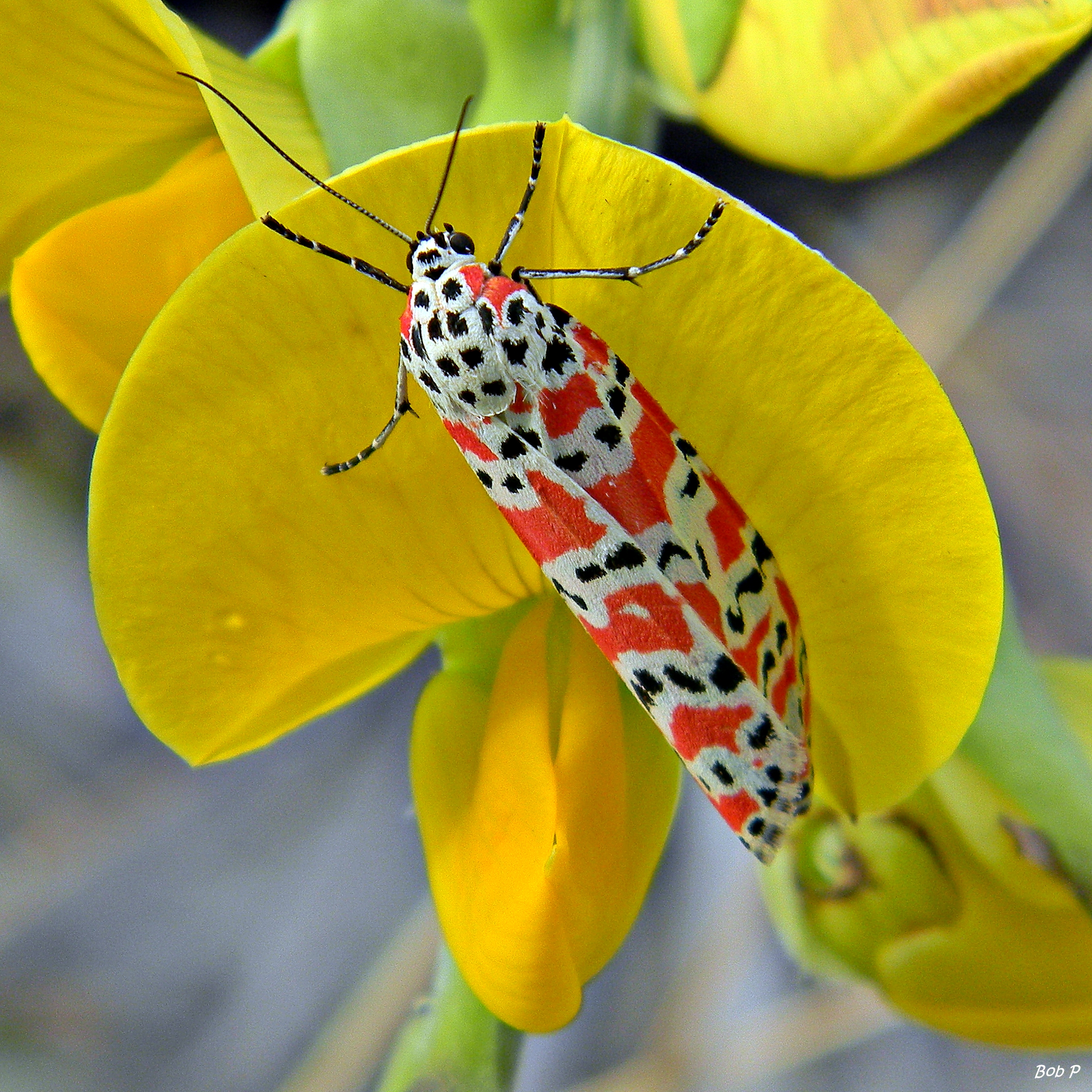
On rattlebox blossom (Crotalaria sp.)

=== Eggs ===
The eggs of the Utetheisa ornatrix are spherical in shape and range in colour from white to yellow to sometimes brown.

=== Larvae ===
The larvae are orange and brown with irregular black bands on each segment of the body. The anterior and posterior portions of the black binds are also marked with distinct white spots. Full grown larvae reach 30-35mm in length. Although most arctiid larvae have verrucae, Utetheisa ornatrix larvae lack these.

=== Pupae ===
The pupae are mostly black marked with irregular orange and brown bands. Usually, the pupae are covered with a loose layer of silk.

=== Adult ===
These moths are aposematic and use their bright coloration to warn predators of their unpalatability. Their wings range in color from yellow, red, pink, and orange to white. Wings contain white bands containing six bands of irregularly spaced black spots. The hind wings can be bright pink with a marginal black band. The adult Utetheisa ornatrix has a wingspan of 33 to 46 millimetres (1.3 to 1.8 in).

== Predation ==
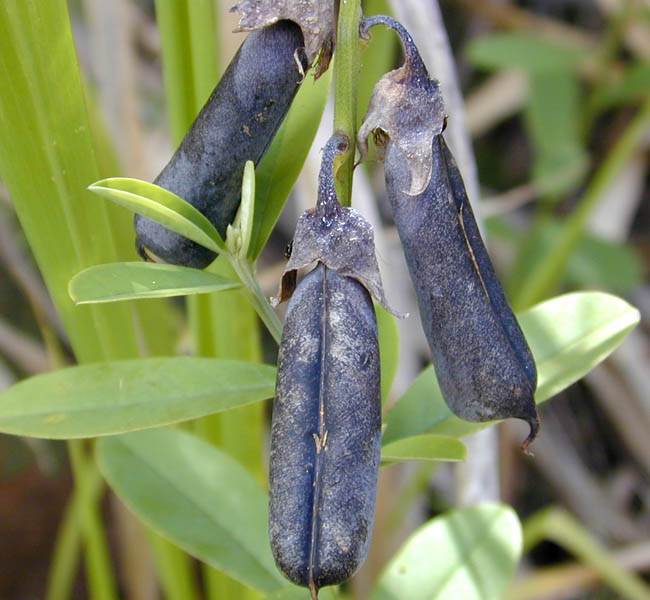
Mature pods of the rattlepod, Crotalaria retusa

During the larval stages, caterpillars feed on leguminous plants of the genus Crotalaria. These plants contain large amounts of toxins, particularly pyrrolizidine alkaloids (PAs), which are found in high concentrations in the seeds. Bella moth caterpillars sequester these toxins and use them as a deterrent for predators. When the adult is disturbed, they secrete a foam containing the toxins from their head, which makes them unpalatable to predators. Since PAs are an extremely valuable resource, individual larvae compete with one another to colonize an entire pod, an elongated seed-containing pouch from the food plant. Larvae that are unable to take ownership of a pod must obtain the chemicals from leaves, where they are found at much lower densities. These caterpillars sequester smaller amounts of PAs and are more susceptible to predation.

Although it is beneficial to feed on seeds, larvae do not enter the pods immediately after they hatch. During the first larval instars, caterpillars feed on leaves and it is not until the second or third instar that they enter the pods. The evolutionary benefits of this strategy are not understood. When caterpillars metamorphose into adult moths, they carry the alkaloids with them, which continue to protect them during the adult stage.

PAs render the bella moth unpalatable to many of its natural enemies like spiders and insectivorous bats. Spiders that capture bella moth larvae or adults release them soon after, leaving them unharmed. In contrast, bella moth individuals grown on a PA-free diet are readily preyed on by spiders. Similarly, bats that catch bella moth individuals quickly release these unpalatable moths without harming them. Unlike other moths of the Arctiidae, the bella moth does not possess an acoustic aposematism system that would enable it to avoid bats altogether. Bella moth larvae and some predators like loggerhead shrikes are not negatively affected by PAs.

The bella moth is able to detoxify PAs due to the possession of the gene pyrrolizidine-alkaloid-N-oxygenase. It has been experimentally shown that bella moth larvae upregulate the expression of this gene when the amount of PAs in their diet increases. In addition, it has been shown that PA rich diets do not have a negative effect on the fitness of these moths, but only affect time of development, which increases with increasing PA concentration in diet. However, caterpillars with longer development times reach similar pupal sizes compared to those with shorter developmental times due to diets containing smaller amounts of PAs.

=== Cannibalism ===
On occasion, bella moth caterpillars cannibalize other eggs, pupae or larvae from the same species. Since PAs are a limited resource, some caterpillars do not reach optimal levels and resort to cannibalism. This behavior is a consequence of PA deficiency rather than hunger, since deficits in alkaloids are the main cause of mortality. Pupae cannibalism is rare because larvae normally pupate far away from the plant where they feed. Egg cannibalism is also rare because eggs provide larvae with very small quantities of PAs and because eggs from the same cluster hatch synchronously. Larvae may also feed on other bella moth larvae that are laden with alkaloids. This is more common since feeding on one single larva is sufficient to compensate for the cannibalistic caterpillar's alkaloid deficiency.

=== Kin recognition ===
Bella moth caterpillars may have the ability to recognize other larvae as kin, as larvae are less likely to intrude upon siblings than non-siblings established in seedpods.

== Mating ==
Bella moths of both sexes use very complex reproductive strategies, making this species an excellent model system for studying sexual selection. Females mate multiple times over their three- to four-week lifespan as adults. They mate with an average of three to five males, each of whom provides her with a nuptial gift, a spermatophore containing sperm, nutrients, and alkaloids. Adult males invest up to 11% of their body mass to create a spermatophore they provide to a female during mating. The nutrients given in the spermatophore allow the female to produce, on average, an additional 32 eggs.

=== Mating system ===
The bella moth presents a polyandrous mating system, where females mate with multiple males. On average, females mate with three to five males over their lifespan of three to four weeks but can mate with and receive up to thirteen spermatophores. Since spermatophores contain nuptial gifts of pyrrolizidine alkaloid (PA) and nutrients, multiple mating helps the female increase the fitness of her offspring. In addition, multiple mating also benefits the female directly. Since the spermatophores are sizeable and can be digested within the female, multiple mating allows females to accrue the resources necessary to build additional eggs. This is equivalent to a 15% increase in egg production. In addition, multiple mating results in increased transmission of alkaloidal gifts to eggs. This provides protection to the eggs against predation. However, this does not mean that there is segregated allocation of these gifts. Instead, the PA obtained from numerous males is allocated in admixture so that eggs tend to receive from more than one male source. In contrast, normally most of the sperm used to fertilize the eggs comes from a single male.

=== Courtship ===
Courtship begins at dusk. Stationary females release a sexual pheromone that lures males. They emit these chemicals in short pulses to provide close-range orientation cues to male moths as they seek out the females. When a male reaches a female, he flutters around her and thrusts two peculiar tufts of scales from his coremata, two yellow spherical structures by the male's genital organs. By doing so, the male emits a specific scent from his coremata that is attributed to a pheromone, hydroxydanaidal. After receiving the scent, the female proceeds to mating.

Copulation lasts for up to 12 hours. It takes the male about two hours to transfer the spermatophore containing all of the sperm and nutrients he is going to offer to the female. The remaining hours of copulation are exclusively used for alkaloid transfer. These alkaloids distribute themselves evenly around the female body, even the wings, and offer her great protection as they render her unpalatable to most predators. Eventually, the female allocates about one third of the alkaloids she receives to her ovaries, where they will be used to confer protection to the eggs.

=== Female pheromonal chorusing ===
Bella moth mating behavior is exceptional in that females compete with other females to obtain more males, as opposed to males competing with males. As in many other moth species, females release sexual pheromones that males can detect over long distances. However, in most species, females do not interact with one another during pheromone release. Female bella moths are unique in that females from the same family often engage in collective pheromone release termed “female pheromonal chorusing”.

This phenomenon is a consequence of a female-biased operational sex ratio. This means that at any given time, there are more females than males seeking to copulate. This occurs because males lose up to 11% of their body mass during mating and once they are done mating, they need time to sequester resources that will allow them to deliver a spermatophore to the next female they mate with. On the contrary, females do not need time to prepare for their next copulation. Due to the unequal mating rates, males become valuable to females and female-to-female competition rises dramatically as a consequence.

Engaging in pheromonal chorusing allows females to increase the attractiveness of genetic relatives and increase their indirect fitness. Females may also, but less frequently, engage in female chorusing with unrelated females. It has been suggested that chorusing is still beneficial under these circumstances, because cooperation for pheromone release may increase the attractiveness of the entire group and increase each moth's individual fitness. It has been experimentally shown that when females detect other female pheromones they increase the rate of pheromone release and call for longer periods of time. Such observations support the hypothesis that females cooperate with one another to increase mating success.

== Sexual selection ==
=== Precopulatory ===
Although most female moths mate multiply, very low instances of mixed paternities occur. In fact, most progeny in a single clutch is sired exclusively by one male. Females of this species do not select based on age, mating order, between-mating interval, or duration of copulation. Instead, female Utetheisa ornatix demonstrate female choice in mate selection that depends on body size, systemic content of defensive pyrrolizidine alkaloid, and glandular content of the courtship pheromone hydroxydanaidal. Selecting for these males provides the females with multiple benefits such as obtaining sperm packages with more defensive pyrrolizidine alkaloids which results in larger offspring. Offspring fathered by larger males are generally less vulnerable to predation because of their higher alkaloid content, allowing the offspring to have higher viability and fitness.

Larger males with the highest alkaloid content can be distinguished by a specific pheromonal scent that predicts the content of the alkaloidal gifts: hydroxydanaidal (HD). There is a relationship between the size of the male, the type of food the males fed on as larvae, and the composition of its spermatophores. For example, males that fed inside a seed pod rather than on leaves produce higher levels of HD. In addition, these males have higher adult weights and have higher systemic loads of PA, the metabolic precursor of HD. By selecting for HD-rich males, the female moth ensures the receipt of a large alkaloid gift (phenotypic benefit) and genes that encode for large size (genetic benefit).

The female's mating preference is inherited paternally since the preference gene or genes lie mostly or exclusively on the Z sex chromosome. The preferred male trait and the female preference for the trait are strongly correlated; females with larger fathers have a stronger preference for larger males.

=== Postcopulatory ===
After copulating with several males, rival sperm carried by a female do not compete directly for access to the eggs. Females direct a postcopulatory selective process where they choose male sperm based on the intensity of the courtship pheromone that was released prior to copulation, hydroxydanaidal (HD). The intensity of this signal is directly proportional to the amount of alkaloids sequestered by the moth during the larval stages. As a consequence, this pheromone is an indirect indicator of success during larval development and will ultimately determine which sperm will be passed on to the offspring. Once they have selected a male, females use their musculature to channel the selected sperm through the chambers and constructs of their reproductive systems to their eggs.

== Parental investment ==
The eggs of the bella moth contain pyrrolizidine alkaloids (PAs) that the mother delivers. The alkaloid is stored during the larval stages and retained through metamorphosis, protecting both larvae and adults from predators. Female moths receive alkaloids from the males at the time of mating as part of the spermatophore. Although the male's contribution of PAs is less than that of the female, it still contributes significantly to egg protection.

=== Spermatophore ===
The spermatophore that males give to the females when mating contains sperm, nutrients, and pyrrolizidine alkaloids (PA), and accounts for up to 11% of the male's body mass. PA plays an important role in preventing predation in Utetheisa ornatrix because it is poisonous to most organisms. Males transmit PA to the females via a sperm package; the females then give this mating gift to the eggs, along with their own alkaloidal supplement and is utilized to protect the offspring from predation. In addition, females also personally benefit from the gift through protection and nutrition. After mating with a PA-rich male, the received PA is quickly allocated to all body parts. As a result, females become and remain unacceptable as prey to numerous organisms such as spiders. Another problem that females face is the risk of incurring a PA deficit due to the large amount of eggs they lay. Spermatophores is one way for females to compensate for this loss in PA.

== Host plants ==
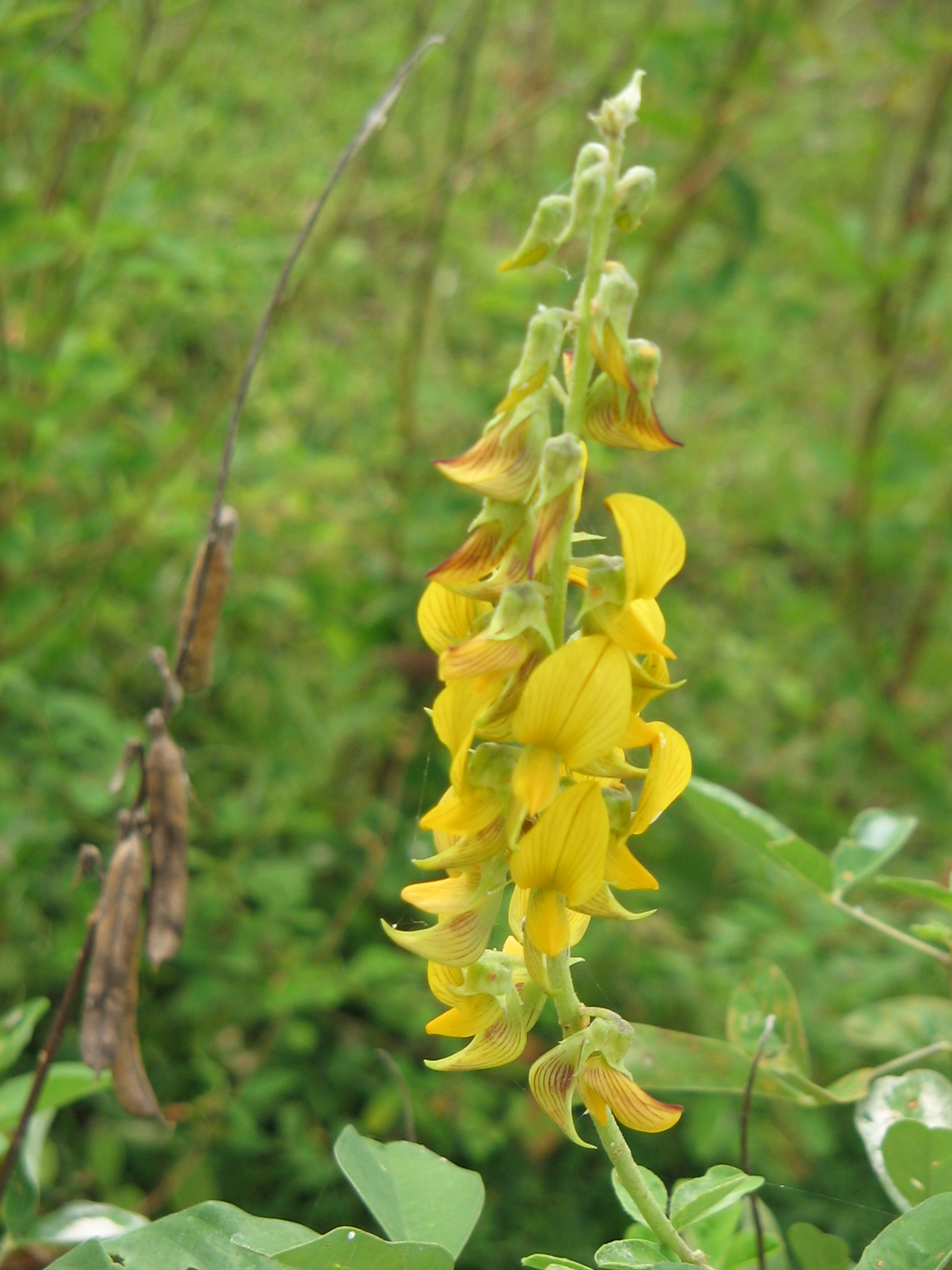
Crotalaria pallida

Plants of the genus Crotalaria are the major hosts for the Utetheisa ornatrix, although a variety of plants in the family Fabaceae have also been cited in literature. The word Crotalaria originates from the Greek root “crotal,” which means “a rattle” and is characteristic of the pods found on these plants. The Crotalaria host plants contain pyrrolizidine alkaloids, which are used by the Utetheisa ornatrix to repel predators. Specific host plants used include:

- Crotalaria avonensis (Avon Park rattlebox)
- Crotalaria rotundifolia (rabbitbells)
- Crotalaria lanceolata
- Crotalaria pallida (smooth rattlebox)
- Crotalaria spectabilis (showy rattlebox)
- Crotalaria retusa

== Pyrrolizidine alkaloids and humans ==
Pyrrolizidine alkaloids (PAs) are the toxins the bella moth is able to ingest and use for protection from predators. They are known to be the principal toxins found in plants that can cause disease in humans and other animals. Reported pathways for human exposure include crop contamination, milk and honey contamination and some traditional herbal medicines. Once ingested, the alkaloids affect mainly the liver and the lungs. Human poisoning can cause veno-occlusive disease and teratogenicity.
