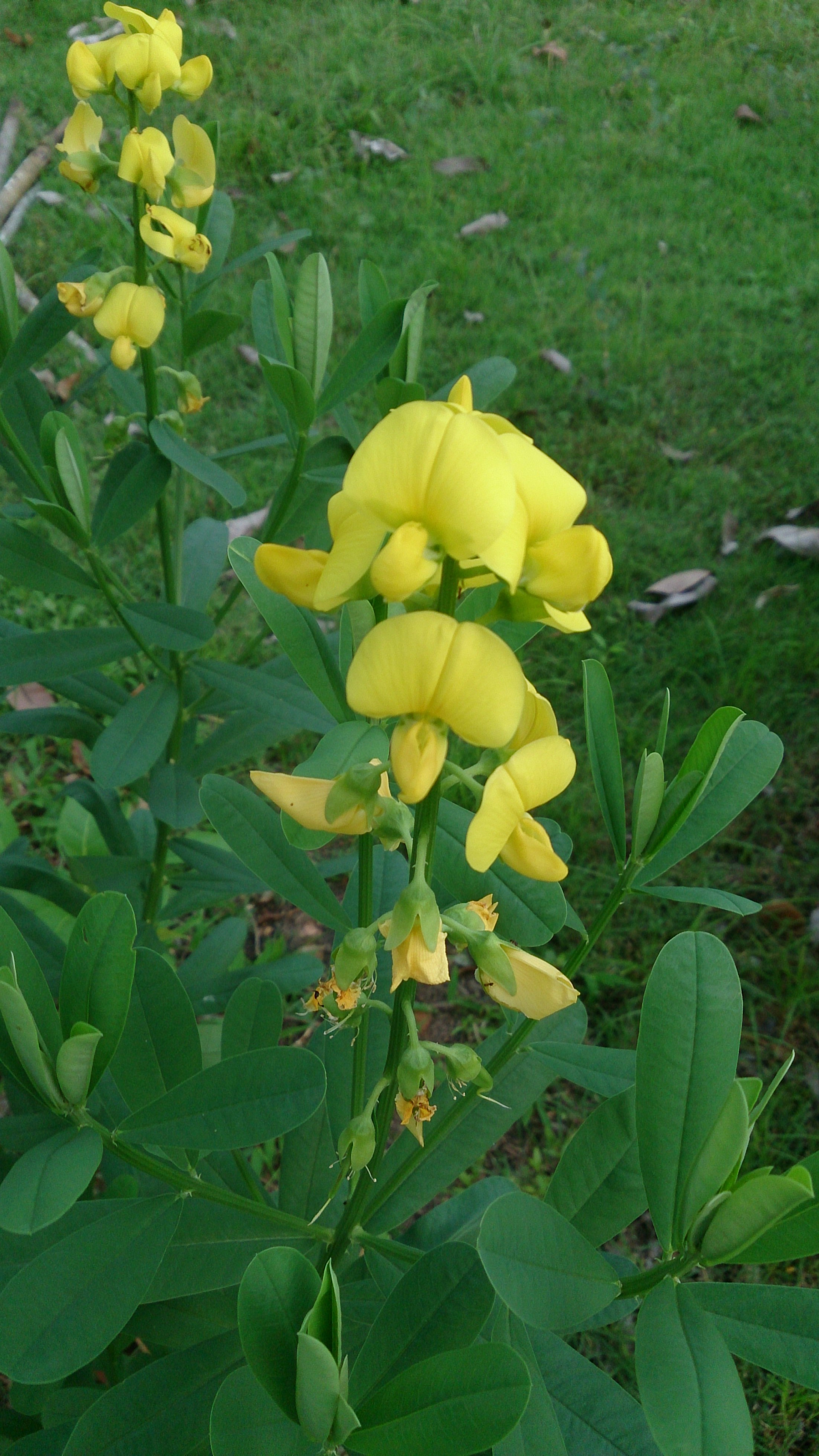

Scientific classification
- Kingdom: Plantae
- Clade: Tracheophytes
- Clade: Angiosperms
- Clade: Eudicots
- Clade: Rosids
- Order: Fabales
- Family: Fabaceae
- Subfamily: Faboideae
- Genus: Crotalaria
- Species: C. retusa

Binomial name
- Crotalaria retusa L.
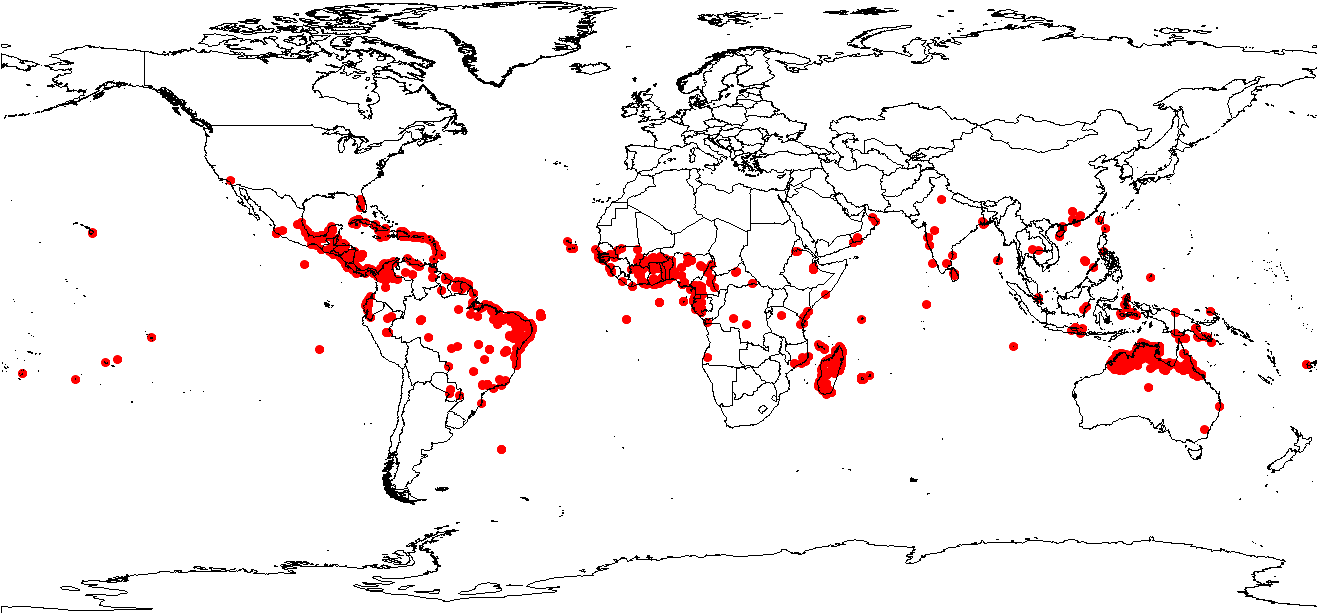
- Occurrence data from GBIF

Synonyms
- Crotalaria cuneifolia (Forssk.) "Schrank"; Crotalaria cuneifolia Raf.; Crotalaria hostmannii Steud.; Crotalaria retusifolia Stokes; Dolichos cuneifolius Forssk.; Lupinus cochinchinensis Lour.

= Crotalaria retusa =

Species of plant

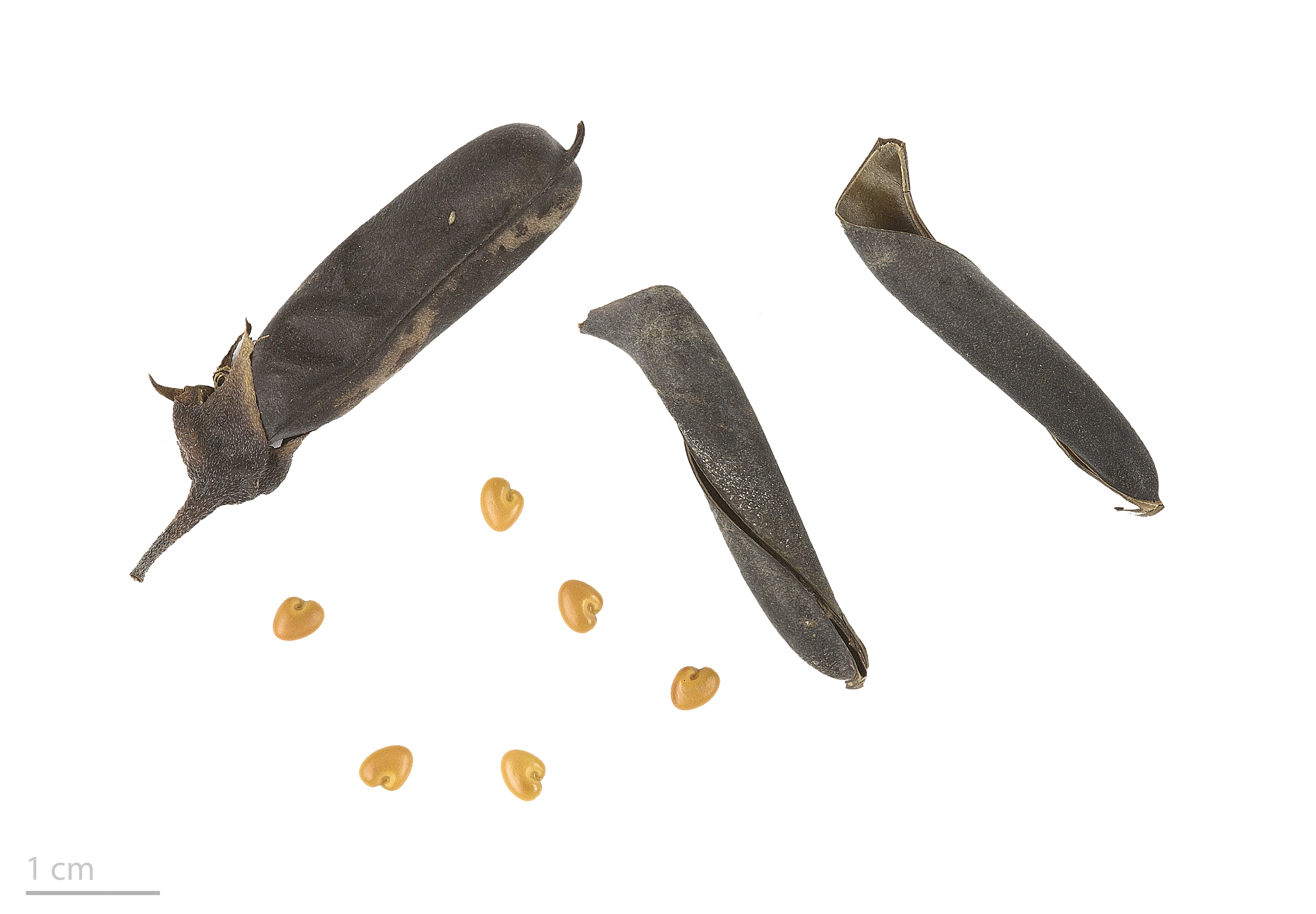
Crotalaria retusa - MHNT

Crotalaria retusa is a species of flowering plant in the legume family known by various common names including devil-bean, rattleweed, shack shack, and wedge-leaf rattlepod. It is poisonous to livestock, and contaminates human food. Its original native range is unclear, probably including tropical Asia, Africa and Australia. It has been introduced as a crop plant in many tropical areas and has escaped from cultivation to become a troublesome weed; it is listed as a noxious weed in several US states, Puerto Rico, the Virgin Islands, and is listed as an invasive weed in India, Cuba, and Cocos Island. Unlike some other species of Crotalaria, it is an annual plant.

== Description ==
It is an annual herb, about 60–150 centimetres (2–5 ft) high, with erect, angular, green branches. The soft leaves (dark green on the upper surface, lighter underneath) are alternate, and narrowly oblong or wedge-shaped. The yellow flowers grow widely spaced in racemes at the end of the stem. The pods are thin walled, and widely spaced along the stems, and when ripe are purple to black, containing about 18-20 small brown seeds.

== Habitat/ecology ==
In Australia, where it is considered a native, it grows in the Kimberley on sand, clay, sandstone, and rocky basaltic soils, and is found along creeks and rivers, and on the floodplains.

== Uses ==
Crotalaria retusa is grown as a fibre crop and as green manure. It is also used as a forage plant, but is poisonous to livestock.

== Toxins ==
The primary source of toxicity for many species of Crotalaria is the presence of pyrrolizidine alkaloids, which are poisonous to birds and large mammals. Crotalaria retusa seeds are some of the most toxic of Crotalaria species. Pyrrolizidine alkaloids in honey are a threat to human health.

=== Animals affected ===
In Australia, in the field, only horses are known to die from eating this plant, with most cases occurring during the wet season. Grazing on the fresh plant over a period of 3 or 4 weeks typically leads to death in about three months, from "Kimberley Horse Disease" (or "walkabout" disease). Death in chronic cases can take two or more years. First signs of poisoning are loss of weight, followed by sleepiness and depression. The horses then become irritable and start walking aimlessly until they die.

In the U.S.A. the seeds have been found to be poisonous to chickens.
