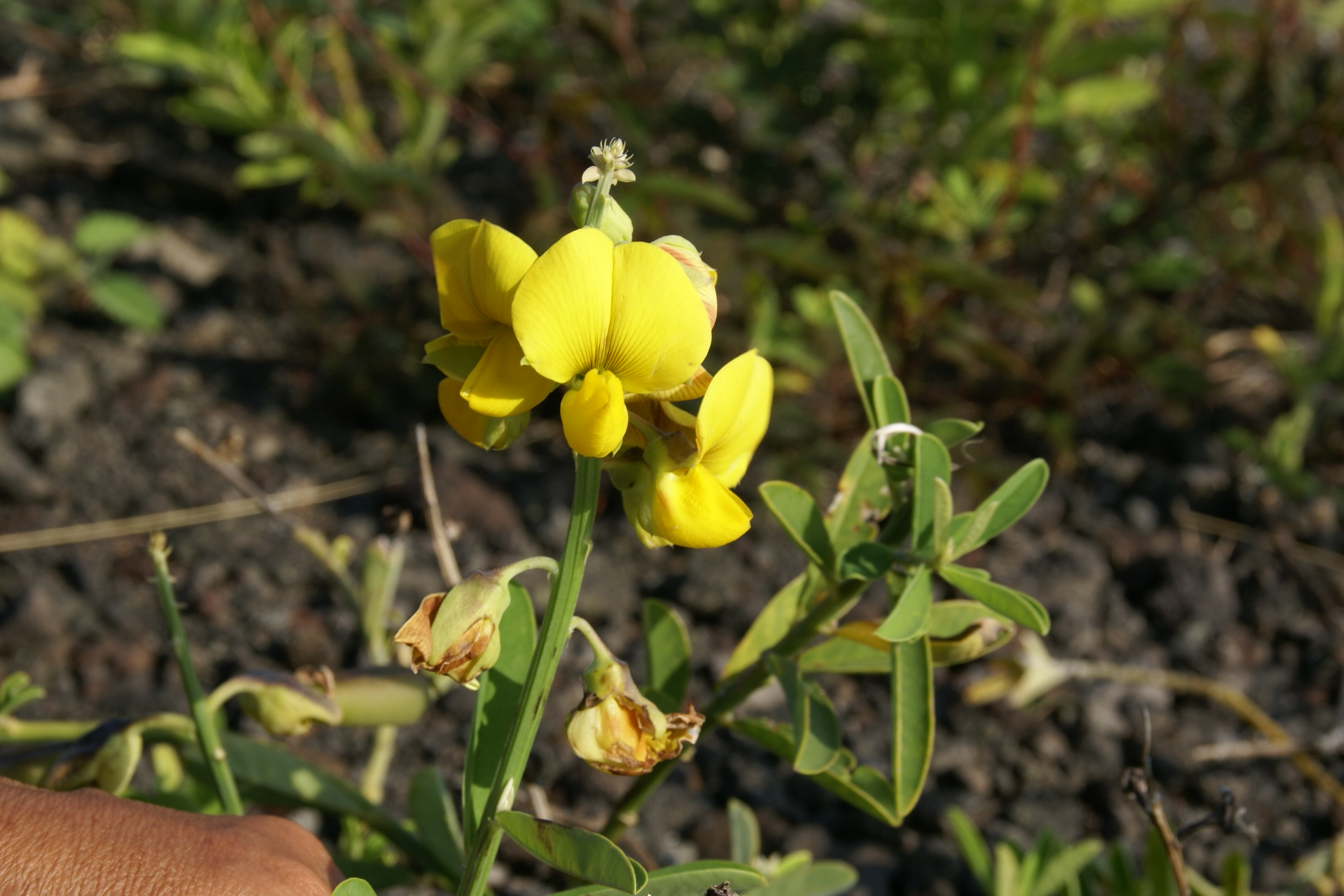
- Crotalaria retusa
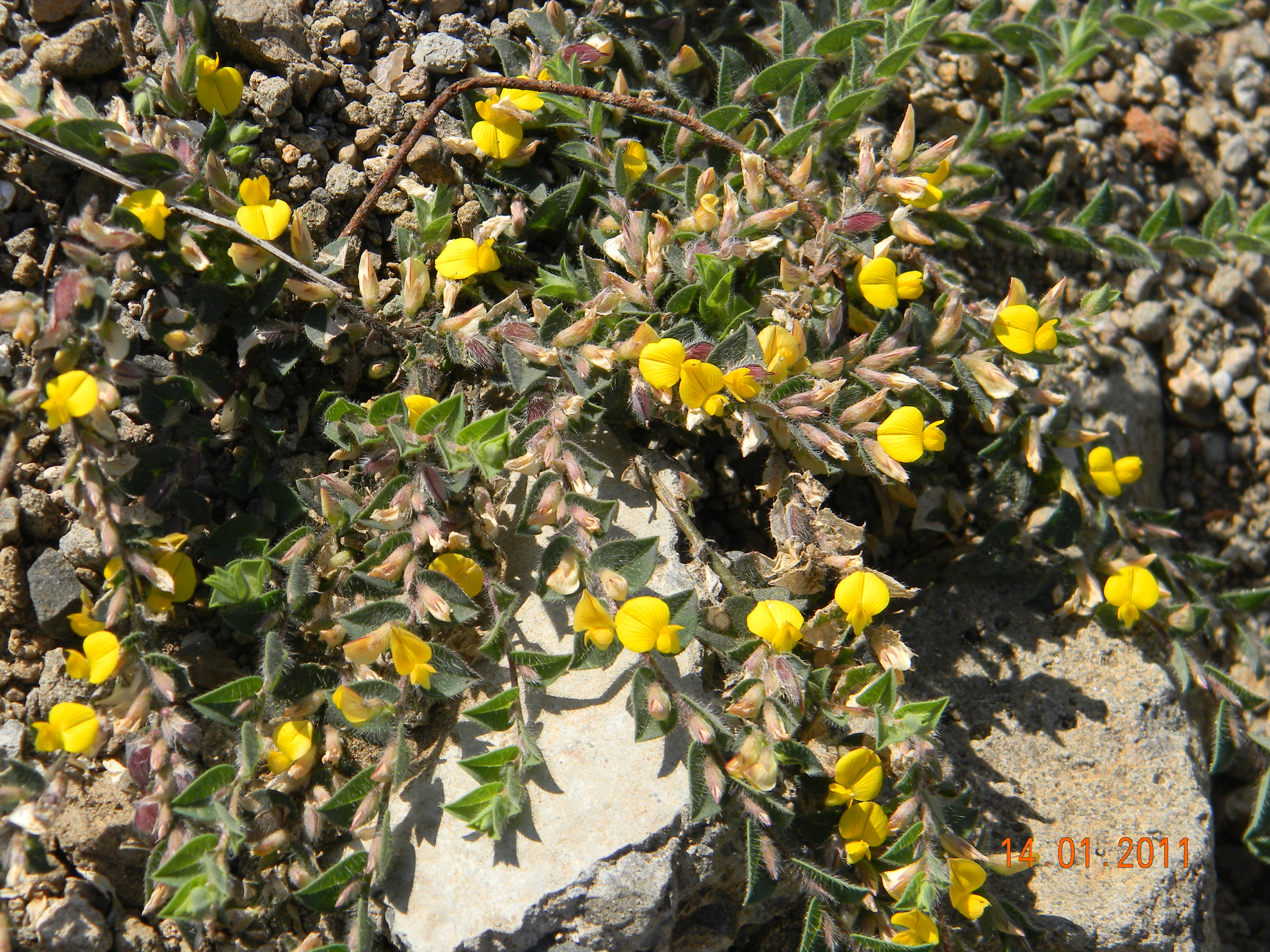
- Rattlepod

Scientific classification
- Kingdom: Plantae
- Clade: Tracheophytes
- Clade: Angiosperms
- Clade: Eudicots
- Clade: Rosids
- Order: Fabales
- Family: Fabaceae
- Subfamily: Faboideae
- Tribe: Crotalarieae
- Genus: Crotalaria; L.

Species
- See List of Crotalaria species

Synonyms
- Goniogyna DC. 1825; Heylandia DC. 1825; Priotropis Wight & Arn. 1834; Quirosia Blanco

= Crotalaria =

Genus of legumes

Crotalaria is a genus of flowering plants in the family Fabaceae (subfamily Faboideae) commonly known as rattlepods. The genus includes over 700 species of herbaceous plants and shrubs. Africa is the continent with the majority of Crotalaria species (approximately 400 species), which are mainly found in damp grassland, especially in floodplains, depressions and along edges of swamps and rivers, but also in deciduous bush land, roadsides and fields. Some species of Crotalaria are grown as ornamentals. The common name rattlepod or rattlebox is derived from the fact that the seeds become loose in the pod as they mature, and rattle when the pod is shaken. The name derives from the Ancient Greek κρόταλον, meaning "castanet", and is the same root as the name for the rattlesnakes (Crotalus).

Crotalaria species are used as food plants by the larvae of some Lepidoptera species including Endoclita sericeus, Etiella zinckenella and Utetheisa ornatrix. The toxic alkaloids produced by some members of this genus are known to be incorporated by Utetheisia larvae and used to secure their defense from predators.

== Current and potential uses ==
=== Food and health ===
Several species of Crotalaria are cultivated as crops to be consumed by human populations throughout the world. The wild and domesticated landraces of Crotalaria tetragona, colloquially known as "tum-thang", are grown and eaten by the tribal communities of the Mizoram state of North-east India. The flowers and pods of Crotalaria tetragona are eaten as vegetables, the flowers and buds are used as garnishing, and the seeds are eaten as pulse. In the Lake Victoria basin of East Africa, the wild and cultivated lines of Crotalaria brevidens, also known as mitoo, are harvested and eaten as a leafy vegetable in many popular cuisines. In Malawi it is zumba. Its wide consumption is mainly due to its nutritional value as a rich source of β-Carotene, which is a precursor of vitamin A.

Crotalaria longirostrata, also known as longbeak rattlebox or chipilín, is found in Guatemala, El Salvador, and Oaxaca and is a popular addition to many local dishes. The edible portions of the plant are the leaves and shoots, which are cooked and served as a leafy green vegetable or desiccated and used as an herb. The foliage contains high amounts of calcium, iron, thiamine, riboflavin, niacin, and ascorbic acid, while the seeds and roots are considerably toxic. Crotalaria longirostrata is considered a noxious weed in the United States since it is avoided as a source of consumption by many animals and since its seeds shatter and spread over a wide range.

Australian species of the genus Crotalaria have the capacity to be cultivated into potential grain crops that are adapted to dry environments, nutrient poor soils, and low-input agricultural systems. Australian Crotalaria species also show many suitable traits of harvestability, including an upright growth habit, a low tendency to dehisce and shatter, the bearing of its fruits and flowers at the ends of branches, and large to moderate seeds.

=== Other uses ===
Several species of Crotalaria are currently being cultivated for suitable traits that are not directly related to human consumption. Crotalaria juncea, also known as sunn hemp, is currently grown throughout the tropics and subtropics as a source of green manure, lightened fiber, and fodder. Crotalaria juncea is also being considered as a potential source of cellulosic ethanol for biofuel.

== Properties ==
=== Toxicity ===
The primary source of toxicity for many species of Crotalaria is the presence of pyrrolizidine alkaloids, which are poisonous to birds and large mammals. The two kinds of pyrrolizidine alkaloids that are found in Crotalaria plants are monocrotaline and spectabiline. Monocrotaline is most toxic to the pulmonary vasculature and is used in animal studies to induce pulmonary arterial hypertension for human modeling. Both alkaloids show clinical hepatotoxicity and carcinogenicity. They can be found in the leguminous seeds, foliage, stems, or roots of Crotalaria plants. Species with higher concentrations of pyrrolizidine alkaloids yield greater toxic effects compared to those with lower concentrations. In addition, species that contain only monocrotaline are more poisonous than species that contain only spectabiline at equal concentrations within the seeds, leaves, stems, or roots. There are no confirmed species to this date that contain both spectabiline and monocrotaline; a Crotalaria plant can only have either one or the other. Thus, plants that are less toxic and therefore more appropriate for human consumption carry only low concentrations of spectabiline. According to one study, species that display the greatest toxicity include Crotalaria spectabilis Roth, C. retusa L., C. alata Leveille, and C. quinquefolia L. Species that are least toxic include Crotalaria australis Bak. Ex Verdoorn, C. maxillaris Klotzsch, C. sphaerocarpa, C. juncea L., and C. brevidens Benth., among many others.

The toxic alkaloids are attractive to butterflies in the subfamily Danaiinae and large aggregations of butterflies occur during the flowering of Crotalaria species in Asia. These butterflies also obtain alkaloids from sap emerging from withering stems and terminal branches.

Among pyrrolizidine alkaloid-containing plants, Crotalaria species cause the greatest range of tissue damage to most domesticated species, causing lung lesions in cattle, sheep, goats, horses, and pigs, and liver damage in most livestock. Some species produce severe kidney lesions

In March 2019, horses in the Federal District of Brazil were fed oats contaminated with Crotalaria seeds, from an earlier seeding intended to increase nitrogen levels in the soil, and at least 13 of them died of liver failure.

== Species ==
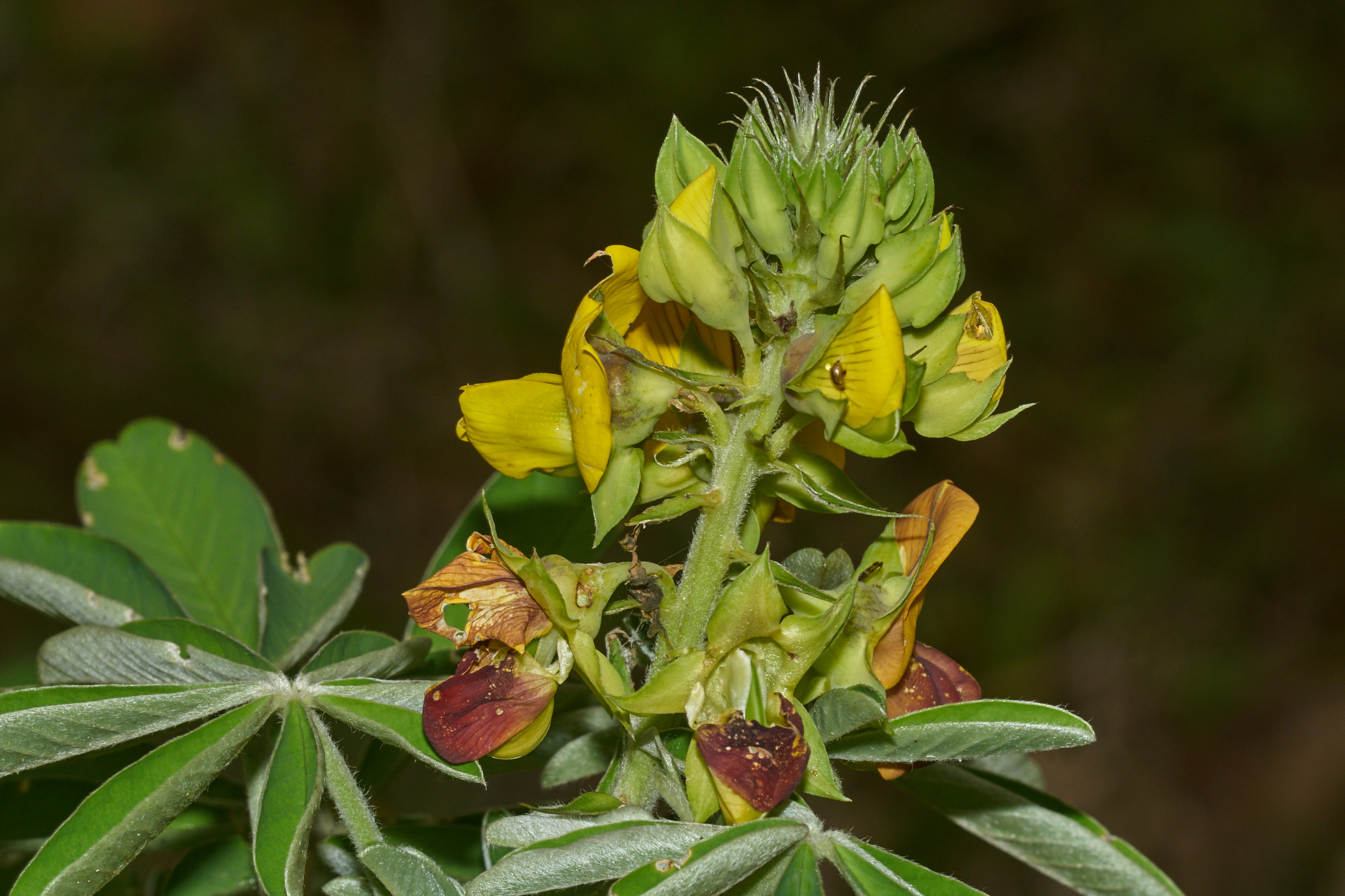
Crotalaria grahamiana in Thekkady, Kerala

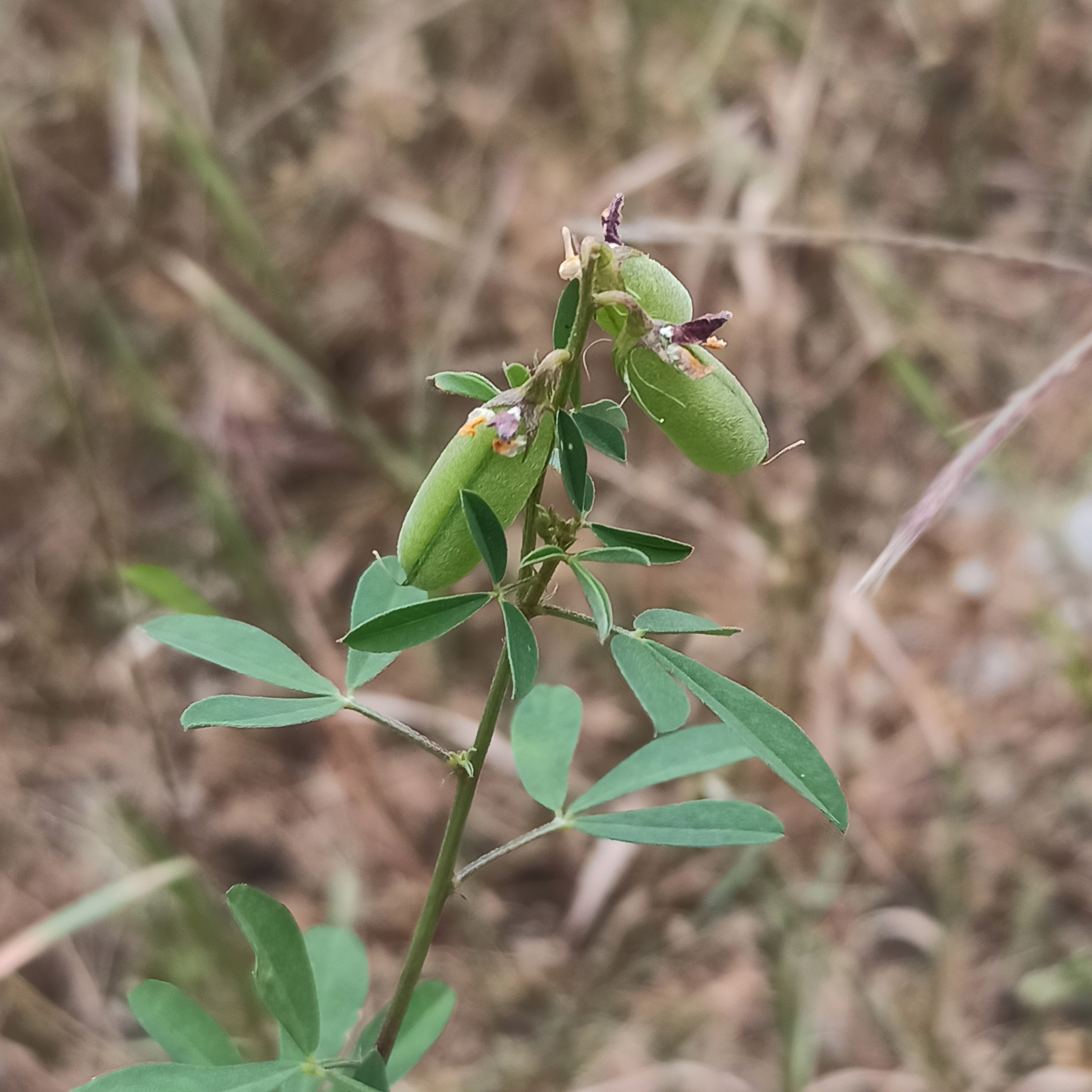
Fruits of Crotalaria pumila

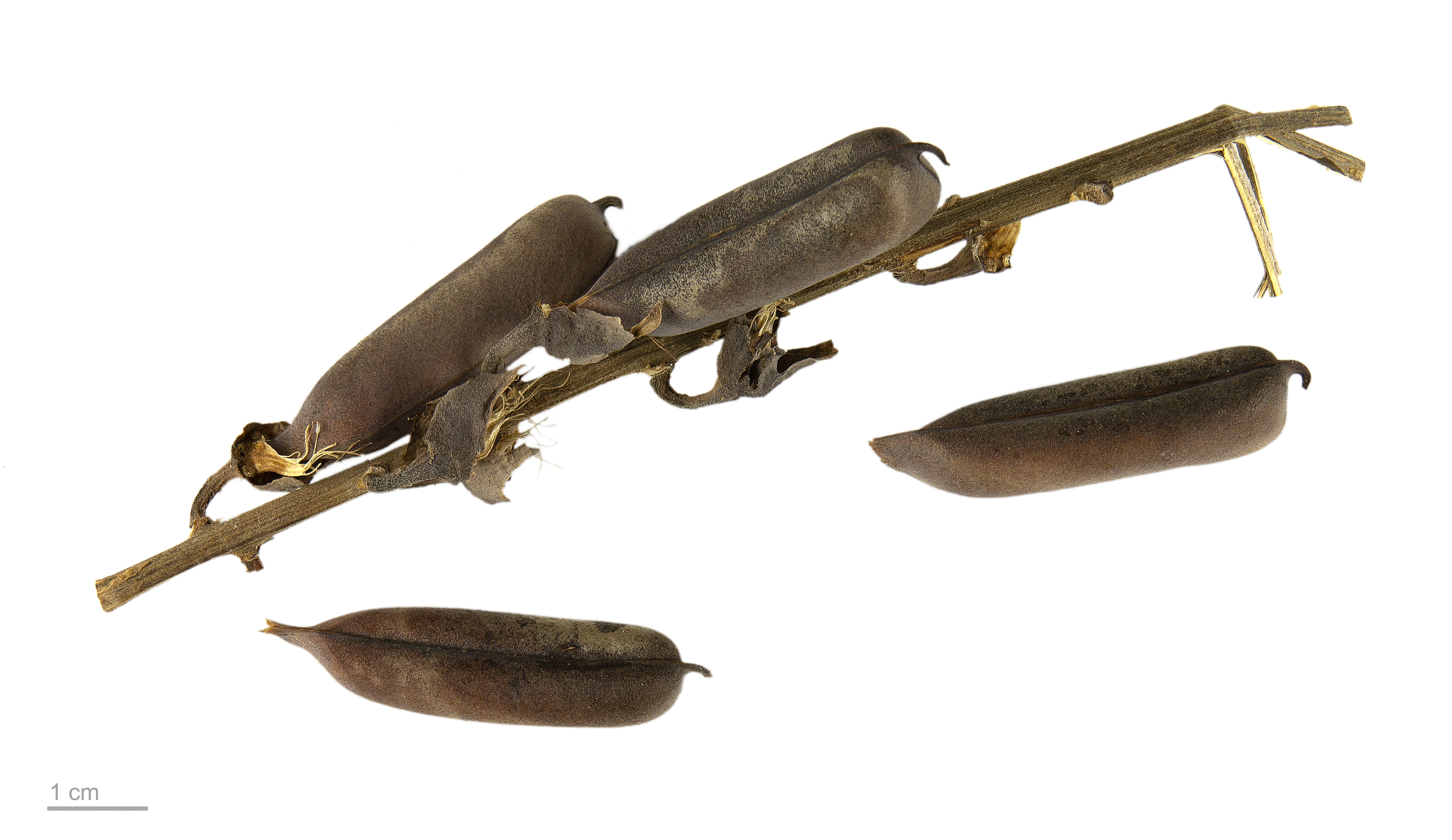
Crotalaria sp.

- Crotalaria spectabilis was introduced to the US from India for green manure. As a legume that supports nitrogen fixing bacteria, it is considered a "soil builder". However, it is also poisonous to cattle (as are many legumes), and has spread rapidly throughout the Southeastern United States where it is now considered an invasive species. The alkaloid monocrotaline, a pyrrolizidine alkaloid, the main toxic principle of Crotalaria spectabilis, is used to induce experimental pulmonary hypertension in laboratory animals. Larvae of the Ornate moth feed on the plant and re-purpose the poisonous compound as a defense, excreting it when they are threatened by potential predation.
- Crotalaria pallida pollen may cause an allergic reaction in humans, including swelling of the eyes and face, a rash on the neck and shoulders, and itching. Symptoms may take up to a week to clear.
- Crotalaria longirostrata and Crotalaria pumila are tropical legumes domesticated since pre-Columbian times. They cover a wide range of uses such as: food and refreshing drink for humans, cover crop or green manure, improvement of fallows, paper elaboration, medicinal plant and honey production (melliferous species). Due to their high protein contents, Crotalaria longirostrata and Crotalaria pumila were further studied to observe potential improvements in the diets of those who consume it. In an experiment, this species of plant was collected in 5 communities of the state of Veracruz. In comparing the relative protein content of each plant, it was found that the cultivated plants with the largest leaves were the most protein-rich, while the plants with the smallest leaves had the least amount of protein. This has important agricultural implications because these plants can be selected specifically for larger leaves in order to yield maximal protein content. Both of these plants are also considered to be valuable genetic resources, and studies suggest that they co-evolved within certain geographic regions. To affirm this, a cytological study between the two species was conducted, and it was found that their chromosomes are very similar in shape and size. The highly symmetrical nature of these two karyotypes suggests a close phylogenetic relationship between the two.
- Crotalaria brevidens and Crotalaria ochroleuca are leafy vegetable species found to be cultivated in western Kenya. Several tribes known to reside in the country, including the Luhyas, Luos and Kisiis tribes, have been reported to have an extraordinarily high number of these species in comparison to other plant species in their communities. Over time, the Luhyas, Luos and Kisiis have selected both of these species of plants to have high yields. Alongside, this, C. brevidens and C. ochroleuca can be used as cover crops. They have also been selected by these Kenyan tribes to have high tolerance to disease and poor soil. Both of these serve as indications that the food production systems of each tribe evolved with the emphasis of vegetable cooking.

== See also ==
- Senna covesii, unrelated plant sometimes also called "rattlepod"
