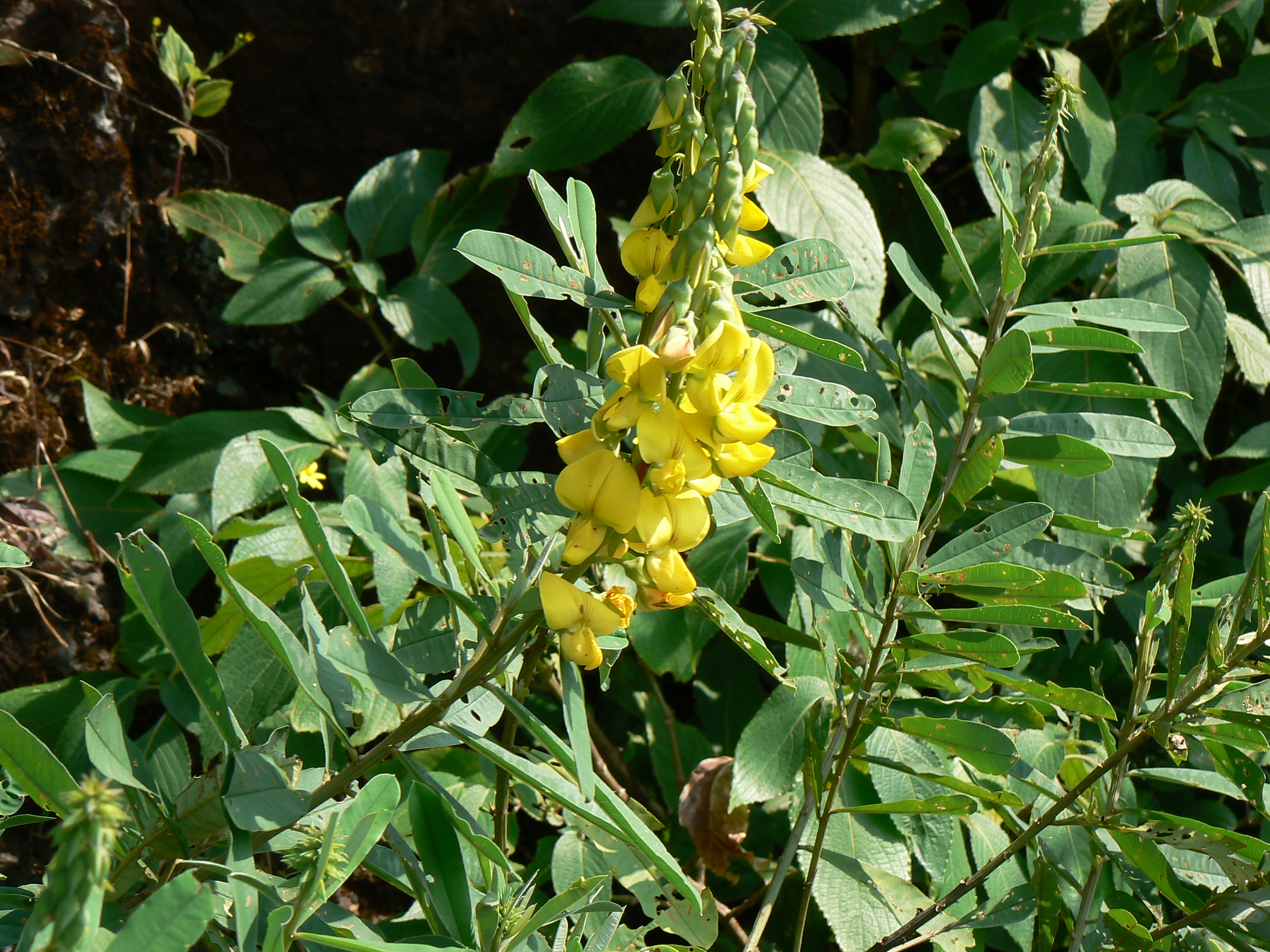
- Habit
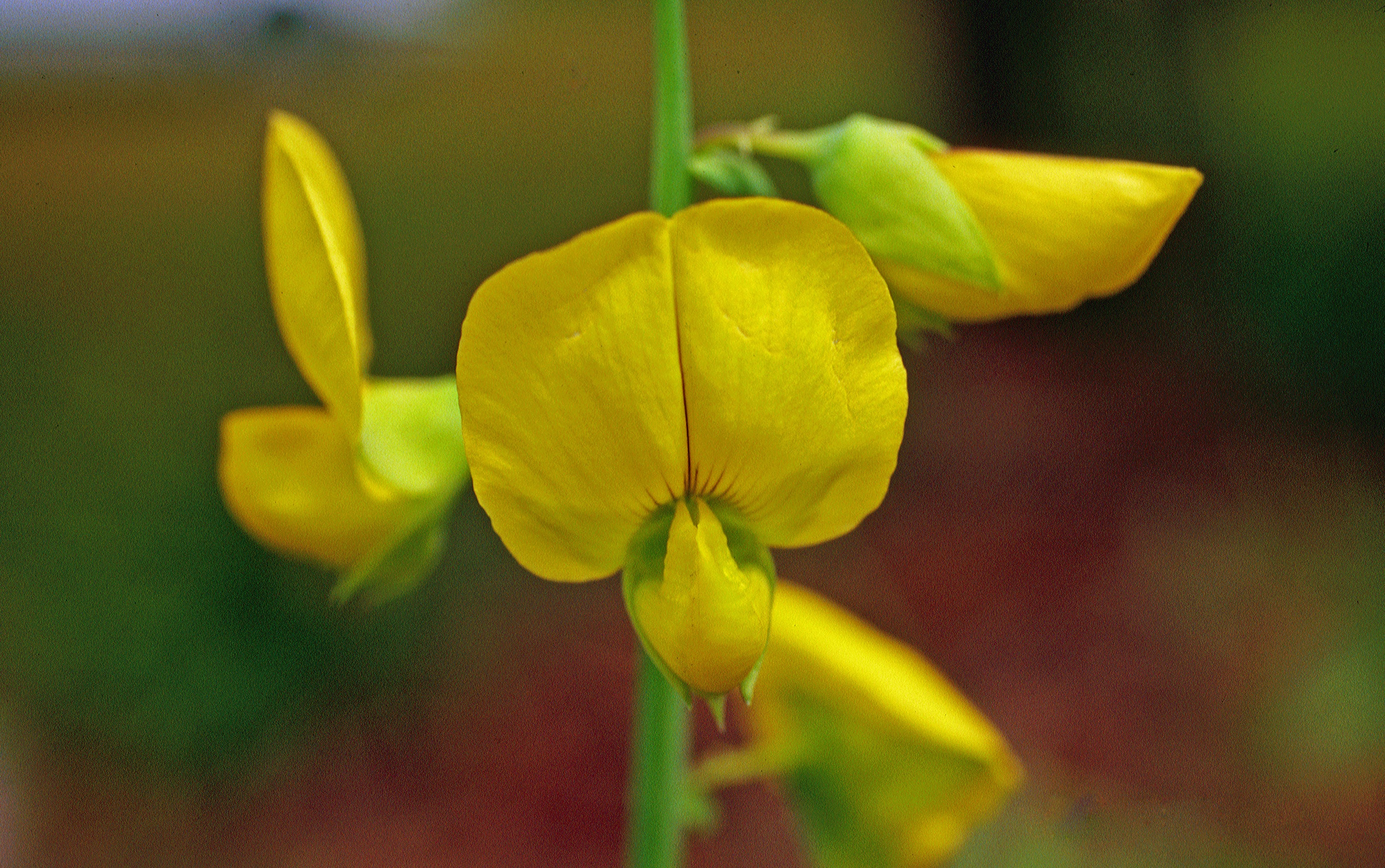
- Close-up of flower

Scientific classification
- Kingdom: Plantae
- Clade: Tracheophytes
- Clade: Angiosperms
- Clade: Eudicots
- Clade: Rosids
- Order: Fabales
- Family: Fabaceae
- Subfamily: Faboideae
- Genus: Crotalaria
- Species: C. spectabilis

Binomial name
- Crotalaria spectabilis Roth

Synonyms
- List: Crotalaria alatipes Raf.; Crotalaria leschenaultii Macfad.; Crotalaria lupiniflora Graham; Crotalaria lupinifolia Steud.; Crotalaria macrophylla Weinm.; Crotalaria retzii Hitchc.; Crotalaria sericea Retz.; Crotalaria spectabilis subsp. parvibracteata Niyomdham

= Crotalaria spectabilis =

Species of flowering plant

Crotalaria spectabilis, the showy rattlebox or showy rattlepod, is a species of flowering plant in the pea family Fabaceae. It is native to the Indian Subcontinent, southern China, and Southeast Asia. It is a perennial herb that grows up to 0.6–1.5 m (24–59 in) tall. It grows in montane grasslands, along forest edges, and within meadows. It was introduced (originally as a green manure) to most of the world's tropics and subtropics and is now a serious agricultural pest species. It is toxic to livestock, causing liver damage.

== Ecology ==
Crotalaria spectabilis is insect pollinated and is recorded to have been visited in northern Florida by Lasioglossum apopkense.
