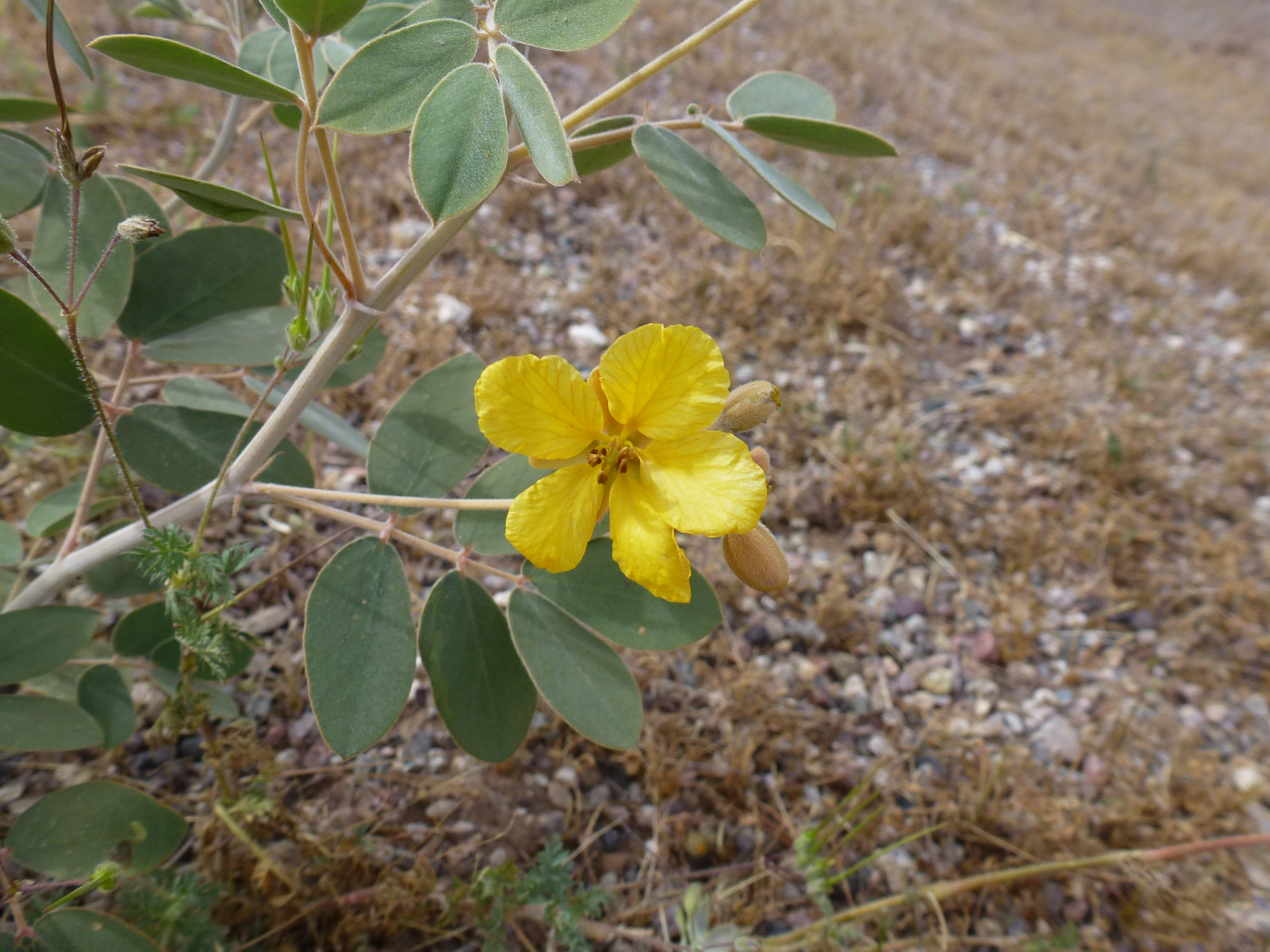

Conservation status
- Secure (NatureServe)

Scientific classification
- Kingdom: Plantae
- Clade: Tracheophytes
- Clade: Angiosperms
- Clade: Eudicots
- Clade: Rosids
- Order: Fabales
- Family: Fabaceae
- Subfamily: Caesalpinioideae
- Genus: Senna
- Species: S. covesii

Binomial name
- Senna covesii (A.Gray) H.S.Irwin & Barneby

Synonyms
- Cassia covesii A.Gray; Earleocassia covesii (A.Gray) Britton & Rose

= Senna covesii =

Perennial subshrub

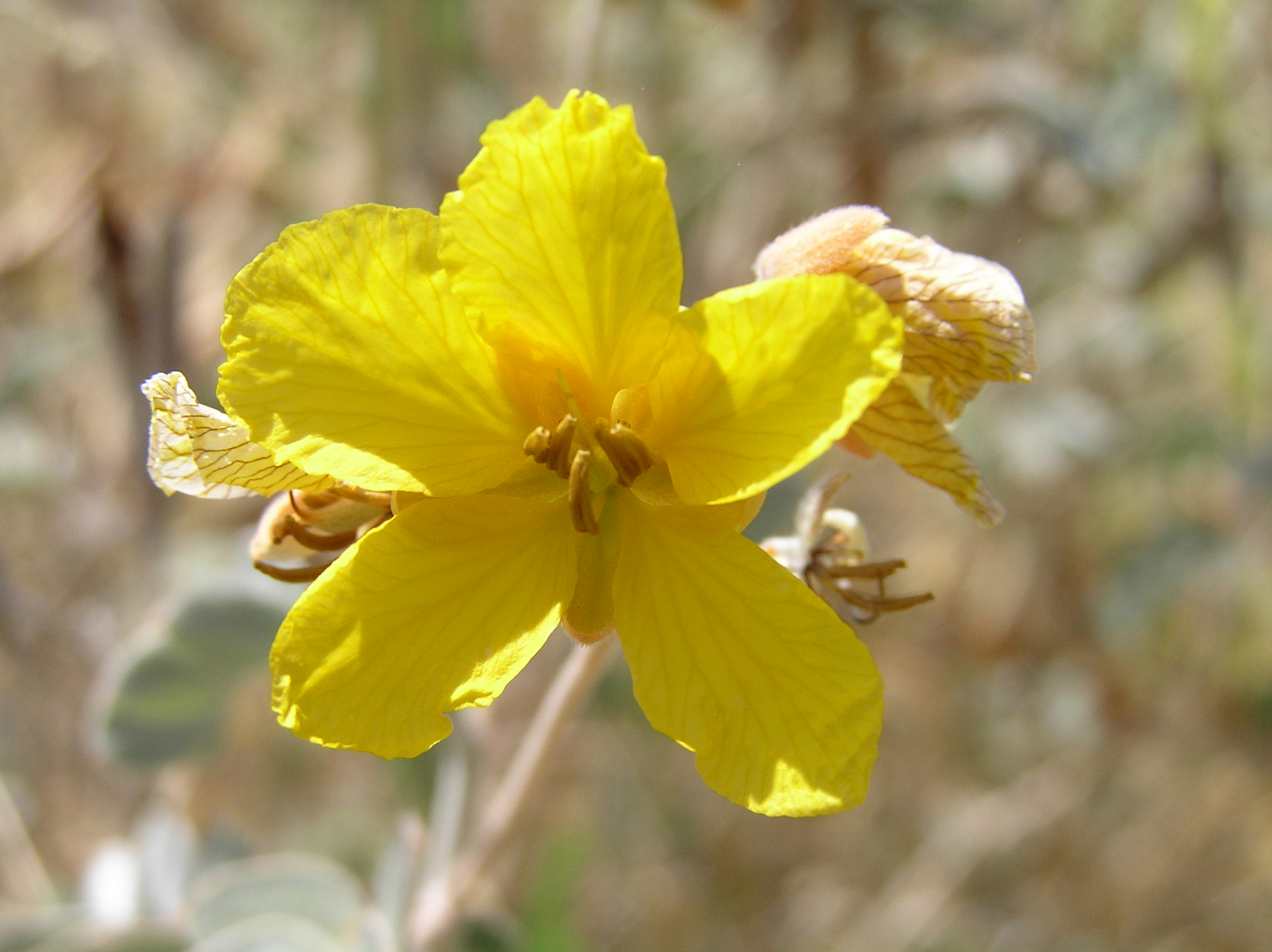
Desert Senna flower, Water Ranch Riparian Preserve, Gilbert, Arizona.

Senna covesii (desert senna, Coues' senna, rattleweed, rattlebox, or dais) is a perennial subshrub in the family Fabaceae, native to the Mojave Desert and Sonoran Desert in southeastern California, southern Nevada, and Arizona in the United States, and northern Baja California in Mexico. It is found on desert plains and in sandy washes between 300 and 900 m above sea level, and is very common in Joshua Tree National Park. The specific epithet honors ornithologist Elliott Coues.

It grows to 30–60 cm tall, and is leafless most of the year. The leaves are pinnate, 3–7 cm long, with two or three pairs of leaflets (no terminal leaflet); the leaflets are elliptical, 1.0-2.5 cm long. The flowers are yellow in color, with five rounded petals about 12 mm long.

This shrub is often planted by landscapers and as part of roadside wildflower programs. Flowers are visited by carpenter bees and bumblebees. Sulphur butterflies use the plant as a larval food source.

== Society and culture ==
The O'odham people of the Sonoran Desert call it "ko'ovĭ ta:tam" or "ko'ovĭ ta:tk", which means "rattlesnake's teeth" or "rattlesnake's premonition". Traditionally, the plants were created when First Born removed the harmless teeth of the rattlesnake and threw them far away before creating new teeth for the rattlesnake from the rays of the sun.
