= Skalice =

Skalice may refer to the places:

== Czech Republic ==
- Skalice (river), a tributary of the Lomnice
- Skalice (Hradec Králové District), a municipality and village in the Hradec Králové Region
- Skalice (Tábor District), a municipality and village in the South Bohemian Region
- Skalice (Znojmo District), a municipality and village in the South Moravian Region
- Skalice (Frýdek-Místek), a village and part of Frýdek-Místek in the Moravian-Silesian Region
- Skalice, a village and part of Hrochův Týnec in the Pardubice Region
- Skalice, a village and part of Nečín in the Central Bohemian Region
- Skalice, a village and part of Struhařov in the Central Bohemian Region
- Skalice, a village and part of Třebívlice in the Ústí nad Labem Region
- Skalice, a village and part of Žitenice in the Ústí nad Labem Region
- Skalice nad Svitavou, a municipality and village in the South Moravian Region
- Skalice u České Lípy, a municipality and village in the Liberec Region
- Česká Skalice, a town in the Hradec Králové Region
- Klášterní Skalice, a municipality and village in the Central Bohemian Region
- Stříbrná Skalice, a municipality and village in the Central Bohemian Region

== Poland ==
- Skalice, Lower Silesian Voivodeship, a village

== Croatia ==
- Skalice, Split, an administrative division of Split, Croatia

== See also ==
- Skalička (disambiguation)
