= Thomas Hartmann (biologist) =

German pharmaceutical biologist (1937–2017)

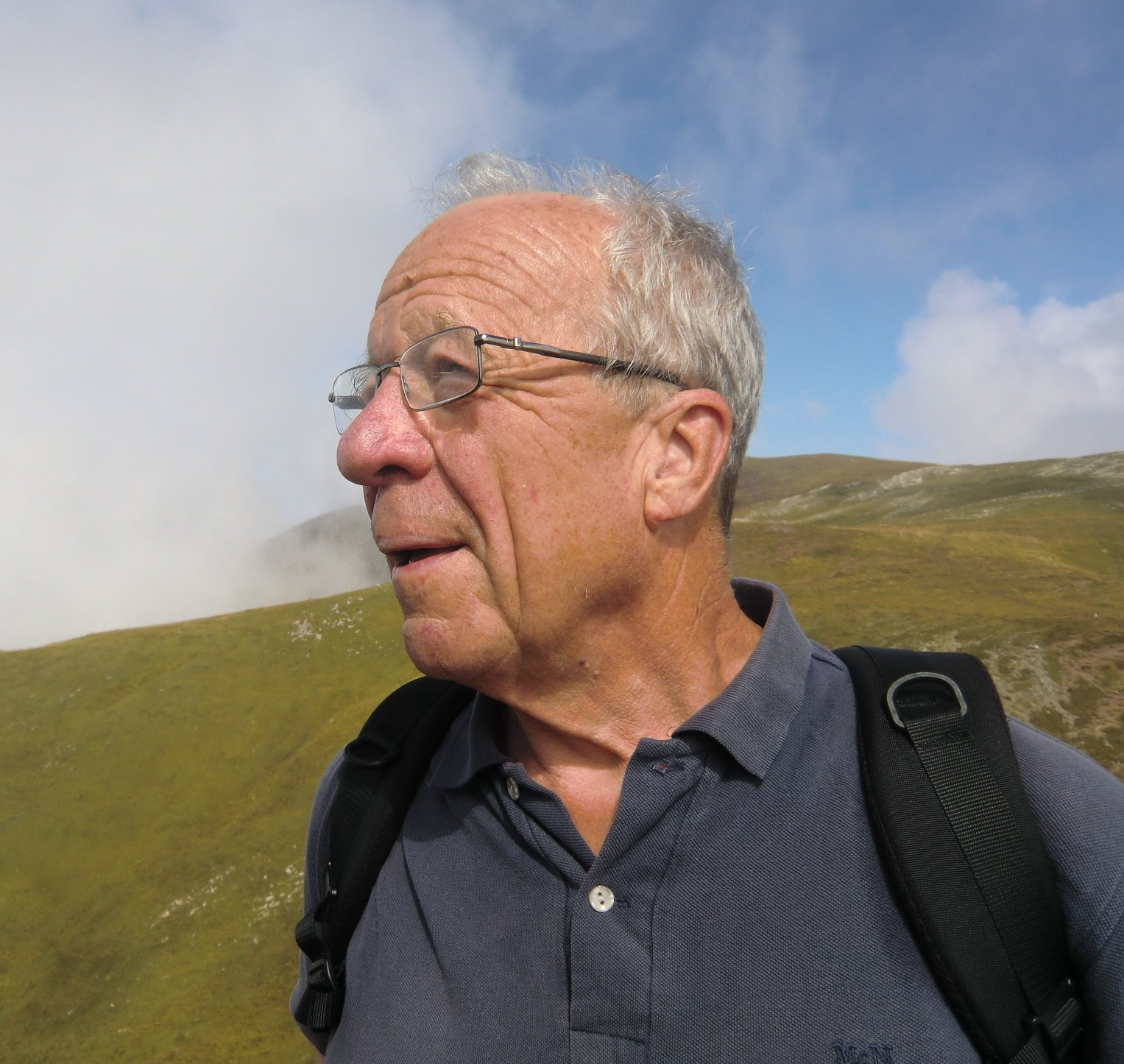
Thomas Hartmann (2015)

Thomas Hartmann (February 2, 1937 – May 27, 2017) was a German pharmaceutical biologist and ecologist who was professor in the Department of Pharmaceutical Biology at the Technische Universität Braunschweig. His research focused on the biosynthesis, intracellular transport, and action of quinolizidine and pyrrolizidine alkaloids in fungi and plants and the sequestration of these secondary natural products by insects.

== Early life and education ==
Thomas Hartmann was born in Berlin as son of architect Hans Hartmann and his wife Liselotte (née Kolbe); he had two sisters, Sabine and Karoline. When his mother died in 1943, Hartmann and his sisters lived temporarily in the family of his uncle in Berlin. In 1951, Hans Hartmann married artist and teacher Tyra Hamann in Bielefeld, who had two adult daughters. Hartmann attended elementary and high schools in Berlin, Bielefeld (Bethel), and Windeck (Herchen), where he graduated from Bodelschwingh Gymnasium boarding school in February 1957.

Starting in 1957, Hartmann studied chemistry, biology and sports at the Rheinische Friedrich-Wilhelms University in Bonn. He graduated in 1962 and subsequently completed his doctorate in 1964 in the lab of biologist Maximilian Steiner at the Pharmacognostic Institute in Bonn (dissertation: Die papierchromatographische quantitative Bestimmung wasserdampfflüchtiger biogener Amine, sowie Untersuchungen zu ihrer Biogenese bei Claviceps purpurea).

== Career ==
As a scholarship holder of the German National Academic Foundation, Hartmann joined the research group of Constant Collin Delwiche, University of California, Davis as a postdoctoral fellow for one year (1964/1965) and returned to the Pharmacognostic Institute in Bonn in 1965 as a research assistant. There he worked on amine formation in algae and higher plants and on the occurrence and function of a L-leucine carboxylase in red algae (habilitation in botany in 1969).

Reaktion der Glutamatdehydrogenase

In 1973, he moved to the Botanical Institute of the University of Bonn as a scientific advisor and professor, heading the Department of Biochemistry of Plants. There, Hartmann conducted research on ammonia metabolism and glutamate dehydrogenase (GDH, EC 1.4.1.2).

In 1976, Hartmann accepted a call from the Technical University of Braunschweig. There he headed the Institute of Pharmaceutical Biology for 28 years - from 1977 until his retirement in 2005. During this time, he initially worked on quinolizidine and, from 1982, pyrrolizidine alkaloids. Hartmann and co-workers elucidated the enzymology, compartmentalization, intracellular transport and function of pyrrolizidine alkaloids in plants and their use in insects.

Quinolizidine

(+)-Lupanine

(-)-Sparteine
Pyrrolizidine

Retronecine

Lycopsamine

N-Formyl-Loline

Senecionine

Hydroxydanaidal

=== Research ===
Hartmann published over 200 research articles (161 listed in Scopus, h-index = 42).

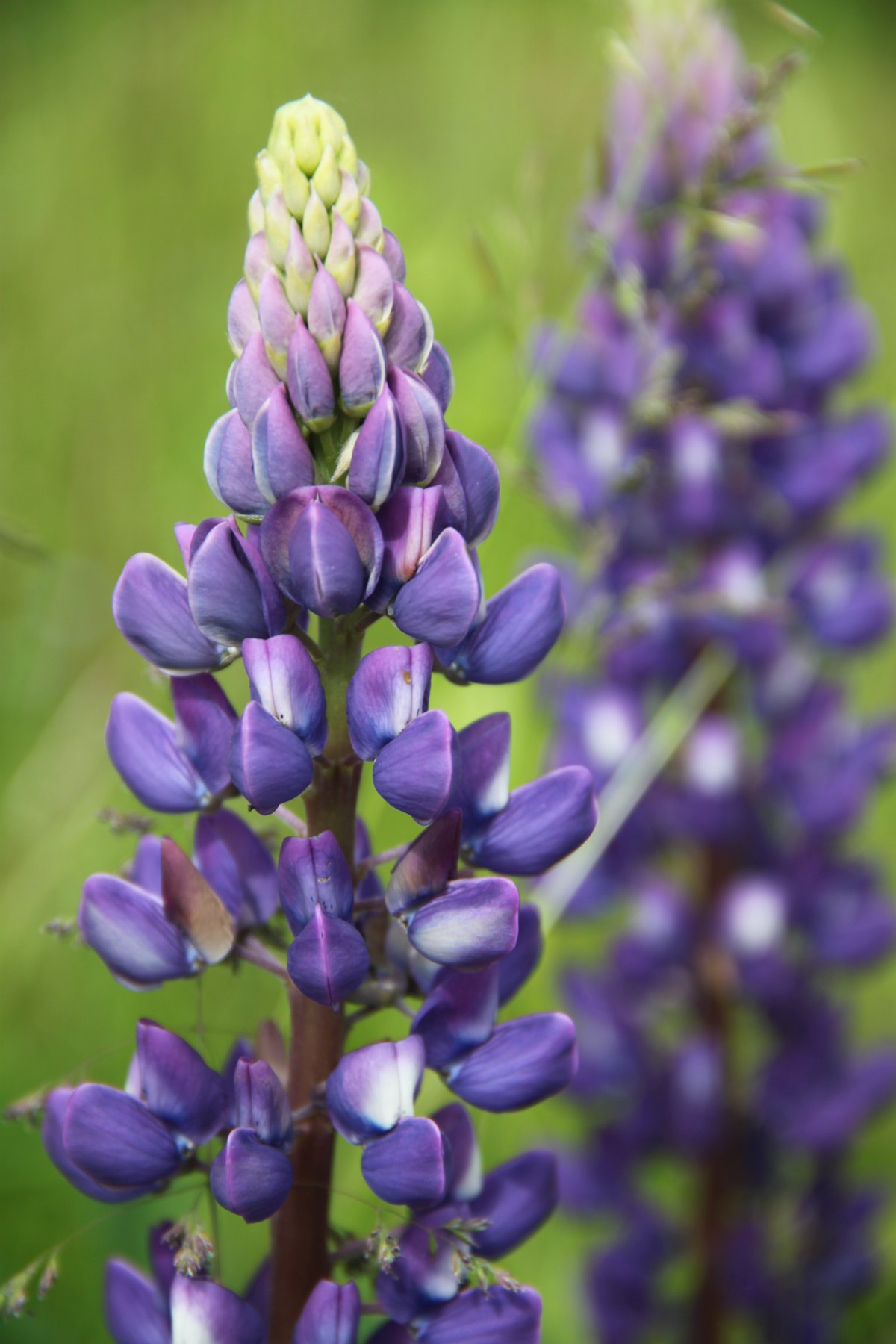
Lupinus polyphyllus (Vielblättrige Lupine)

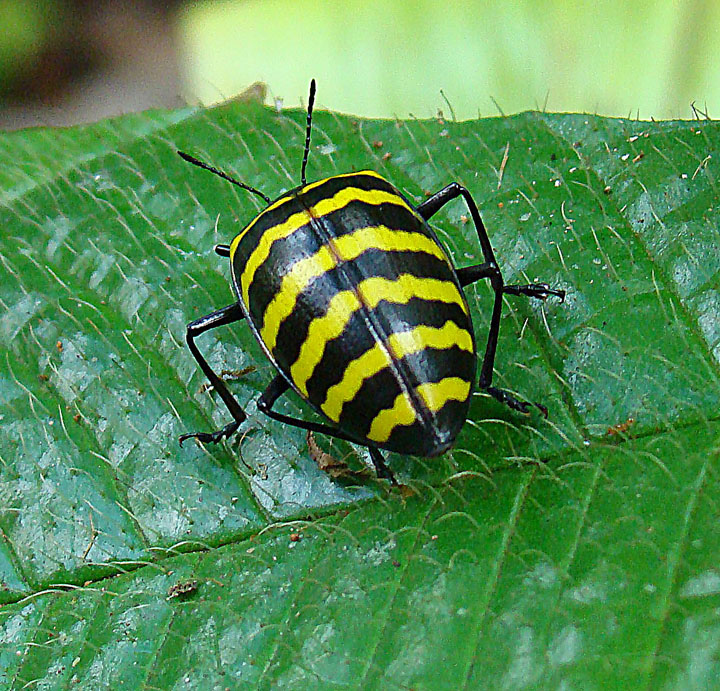
Platyphora boucardi mit deutlich erkennbarer Warnfärbung

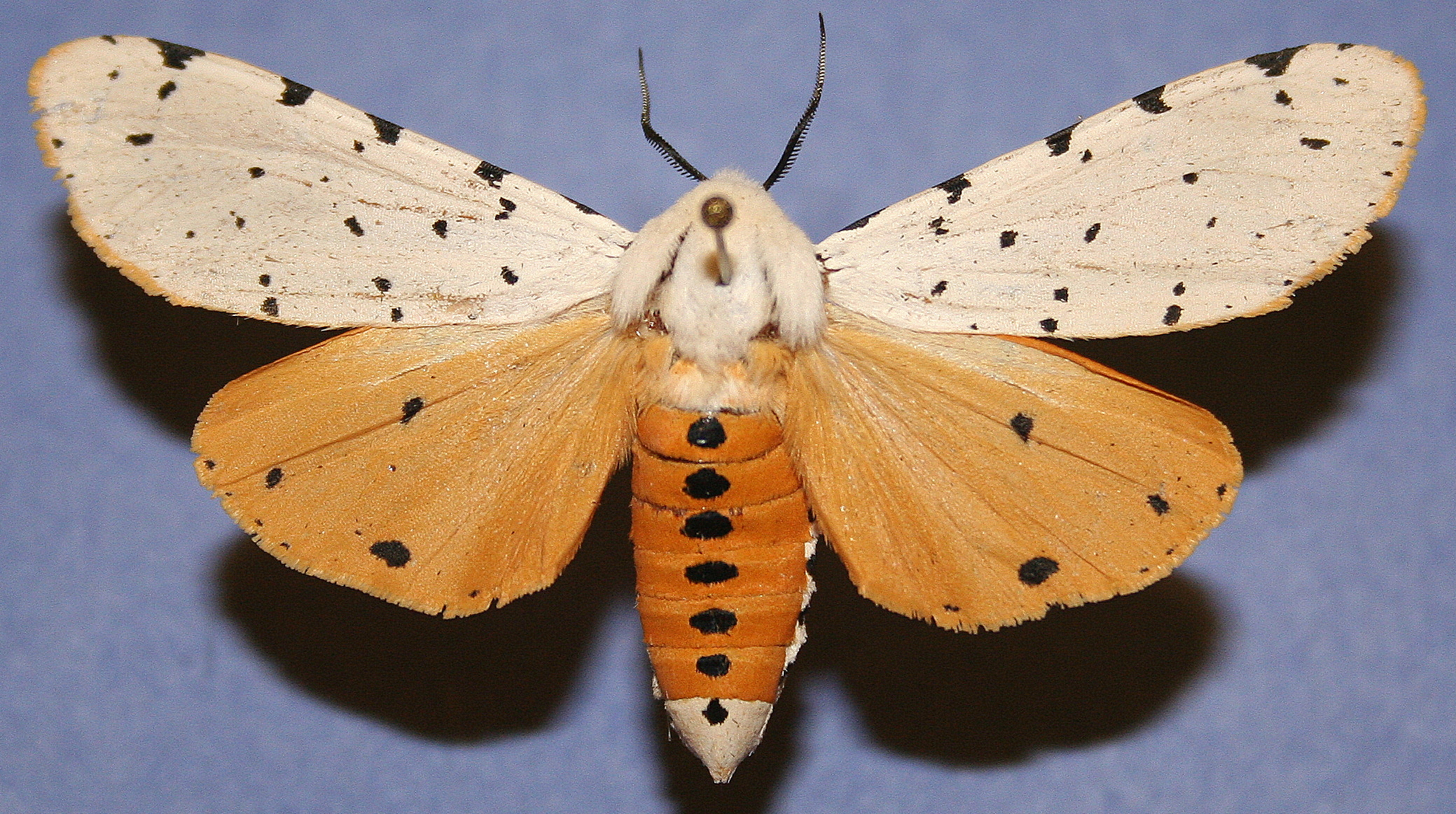
Estigmene acrea; Männchen

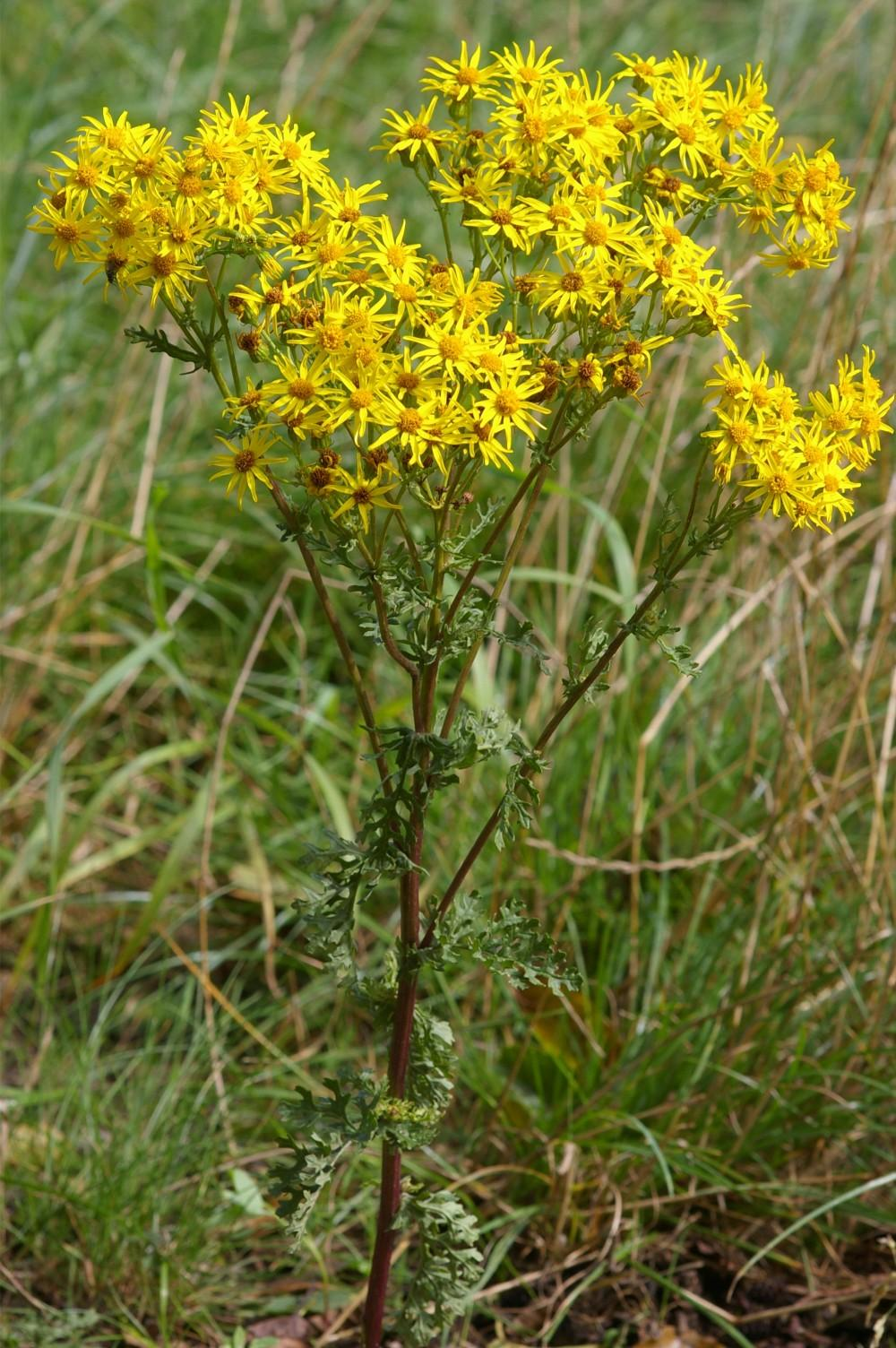
Jakobs-Greiskraut (Senecio jacobaea)

- Quinolizidine alkaloids
  - Biochemical and biogenetic aspects of the biosynthesis of quinolizidine alkaloids in photomixotrophic cell suspension cultures
  - Lysine decarboxylase activity in leaves of alkaloid-producing Lupinus polyphyllus correlates positively with chlorophyll content and alkaloid content of leaves in Lupinus albus and Lupinus luteus, suggesting that in lupin leaves, lysine decarboxylase is an integral component of alkaloid-specific biosynthesis.
  - Review article: Toxic quinolizidine metabolites present in the genus Lupinus are desirable in plant parts (insect resistance) but not in seeds; the limit for commercial use as feed and food (sweet lupin) is 0.02% in alkaloids. Knowledge of alkaloid biosynthesis and the development of knowledge regarding genome and transcription for lupins are creating opportunities for the production of improved lupin plants.
- Pyrrolizidine alkaloids
  - Biosynthesis: importance of putrescine and spermidine as substrates of enzymatic homospermidine formation.
    - Biosynthetic incorporation of the aminobutyl group of spermidine into pyrrolizidine alkaloids.
    - Evolution: the gene for homospermidine synthase (EC 2.5.1.44) evolved from the gene for deoxyhypusine synthase (EC 2.5.1.46, spermidine:eIF5A-lysine 4-aminobutyltransferase).
  - Biosynthesis, diversification and tissue distribution of lycopsamine alkaloids in three species of broadleaf plants (Boraginaceae)
  - Biosynthesis of trachelanthic acid (2,3-dihydroxy-2-isopropylbutyric acid)
  - Biosynthesis and tissue distribution of 1,2-saturated pyrrolizidine alkaloids in Phalaenopsis hybrids (Orchidaceae)
  - Biosynthesis, distribution and turnover of pyrrolizidine alkaloids in Cynoglossum officinale
  - The phytophagous leaf beetles of the species Platyphora boucardi defend themselves against predators by ingesting tertiary lycopsamine-type pyrrolizidine alkaloids (already in the larvae) of their host plant Prestonia portobellensis and storing them selectively in defense glands.
  - Using capillary gas chromatography/mass spectrometry (GC-MS), it has been demonstrated that meadow fescue (Festuca pratensis) selectively produces lolines (mainly N-formyl-loline, then also N-acetyl-loline, N-acetyl-norloline, and traces of loline and N-methyl-loline) as a specific response to infection with the endophyte Acremonium uncinatum up to seed maturation.
  - For the life cycle of the polyphagous salt marsh moth Estigmene acrea, it has been outlined that larvae prefer food with an artificial enrichment of pyrrolizidine alkaloids, which they modify by specific esterification - supinidine ([(8S)-5, 6,7,8-tetrahydro-3H-pyrrolizin-1-yl]methanol) to estigmine (9-(2-hydroxy-3-methylbutanoyl)-supinidine) and retronecine to creatonotine (9-(2-hydroxy-3-methylbutanoyl)-retronecine), as well as other derivatives of these esters. In males, the creatonotines are direct precursors of the male mating pheromone hydroxydanaidal. Hartmann et al. discuss the results in terms of pheromone formation and the defensive role of pyrrolizidine alkaloids against predators and parasites.
  - Senecionine alkaloids are found as secondary metabolites in most species of the genus Greisweed (Senecio; Asteraceae) and serve as a chemical defense against herbivores. Twenty-four of the 26 species of Senecio jacobaea were analyzed by GC-MS and previously unknown compounds were identified. With one exception (senecivernine), all 26 alkaloids identified can be considered derivatives of senecionine with conversion of the necin base moiety retronecin to the otonecin moiety and specific epoxidations within the necin acid moiety. Other reactions include specific hydroxylations, sometimes followed by O-acetylations, specific dehydrogenations, E-/Z-isomerizations, and epoxide hydrolysis and chlorolysis. The results suggest that differences in alkaloid profiles in Senecio cannot be explained by the gain and loss of alkaloid-specific genes, but rather by switching gene expression of specific enzymes off and on.

=== Other activities ===
Starting in June 1984, he was Vice President of the Technical University of Braunschweig, in addition Dean of the Departments of Chemistry, Pharmacy and Biosciences, and Chairman of the Faculty of Natural Sciences.

- He was involved in several scientific committees and societies, including the Scientific Advisory Board of the Leibniz Institute of Plant Biochemistry in Halle (Saale), the advisory board of the Max Planck Institute for Chemical Ecology in Jena, the advisory board of the Swiss National Centre of Competence in Research at the University of Neuchâtel, and the Commission of the Science Council for the Reform of State Examination Courses.

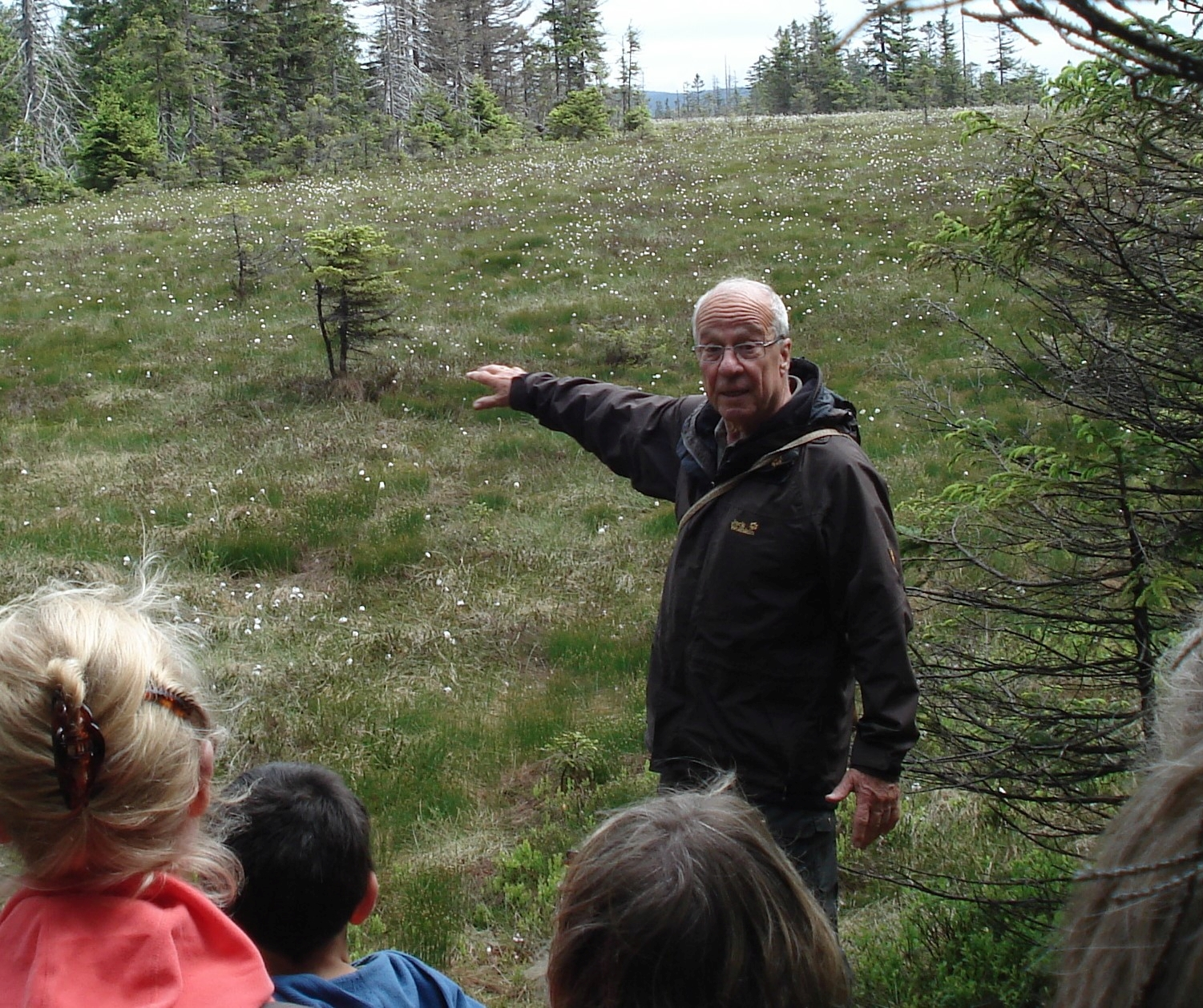
Thomas Hartmann bei einer Exkursion (2013)

- Hartmann also served on the supervisory board of the Gesellschaft für Biotechnologische Forschung (GBF; now Helmholtz Centre for Infection Research - HZI) and was a trusted lecturer of the Studienstiftung des Deutschen Volkes. In addition, he was a full member of the Braunschweig Scientific Society and, since 1999, a corresponding member of the Bavarian Academy of Sciences, as well as President of the International Society of Chemical Ecology.
- On August 28, 2003, he was co-founder of the Förderkreis des Arzneipflanzengartens e.V. in Braunschweig and was elected as its first chairman.

=== Award and honors ===
- Silver Medal Award of the International Society of Chemical Ecology (ISCE) in 1998
- In Memory of Thomas Hartmann: Volume 45(2), February 2019 of the Journal of Chemical Ecology was dedicated to Thomas Hartmann.

=== Selected publications ===
- T. Hartmann und Walter Eschrich: Stofftransport in Rotalgen in Planta, vol. 85(4), p. 303-312 [DOI: 10.1007/BF00381279]
- T. Hartmann: From waste products to ecochemicals: Fifty years research of plant secondary metabolism in Phytochemistry, vol. 68 (2007), p. 2831–2846

== Personal life ==
Thomas Hartmann and Erika Orth married in 1964. They had three children and eight grandchildren.
