= Homospermidine synthase (spermidine-specific) =

Class of enzymes

Identifiers
- EC no.: 2.5.1.45

Databases
- BRENDA: enzyme data
- ExPASy: NiceZyme view
- KEGG: enzyme entry
- MetaCyc: metabolic pathway
- Rhea: reactions
- PDB structures: RCSB PDB PDBe PDBsum
- Gene Ontology: AmiGO / QuickGO
Search
- PMC: articles
- PubMed: articles
- NCBI: proteins

Homospermidine synthase (spermidine-specific) (EC 2.5.1.45) is an enzyme that catalyzes the chemical reaction that combines putrescine with spermidine to form sym-homospermidine and 1,3-propanediamine:

putrescine
+
spermidine
sym-homospermidine
+
1,3-diaminopropane

Unlike the enzyme homospermidine synthase found in bacteria, this protein from plants like Senecio vulgaris is not capable of using putrescine alone as substrate.

The enzyme is a transferase, specifically those transferring aryl or alkyl groups other than methyl groups. The systematic name of this enzyme class is spermidine:putrescine 4-aminobutyltransferase (propane-1,3-diamine-forming).
