= Skałka (disambiguation) =

Skałka is a burial place for distinguished Poles, in Kraków. Skałka may also refer to:

- Skałka, a play by Stanisław Wyspiański, 1907
- Skałka, Lower Silesian Voivodeship (south-west Poland)
- Skałka, Silesian Voivodeship (south Poland)
- Skałka, Świętokrzyskie Voivodeship (south-central Poland)

== See also ==
- Skalka (disambiguation)
