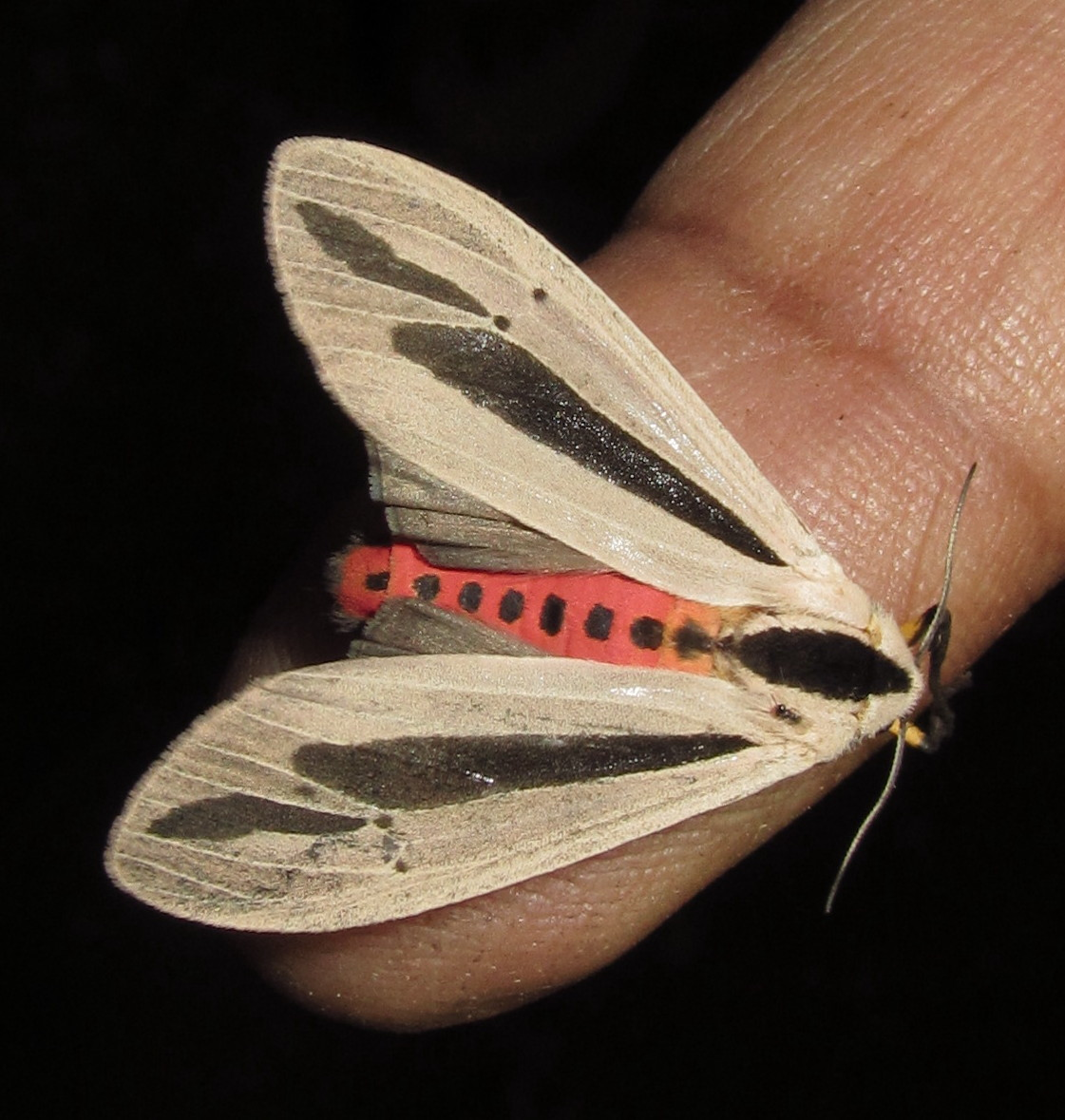

Scientific classification
- Kingdom: Animalia
- Phylum: Arthropoda
- Clade: Pancrustacea
- Class: Insecta
- Order: Lepidoptera
- Superfamily: Noctuoidea
- Family: Erebidae
- Subfamily: Arctiinae
- Genus: Creatonotos
- Species: C. gangis

Binomial name
- Creatonotos gangis (Linnaeus, 1763)

Synonyms
- Phalaena gangis Linnaeus; Creatonotos continuatus Moore; Noctua interrupta Linnaeus; Creatonotos flavoabdominalis Bang-Haas

= Creatonotos gangis =

Species of arctiine moth

Creatonotos gangis, the Baphomet moth, is a species of arctiine moth in South East Asia and Australia. It was described by Carl Linnaeus in his 1763 Centuria Insectorum. It is often listed as a synonym of Creatonotos interrupta, but the identity is unclear.

== Description and life cycle ==
Adults have white hindwings and brown forewings, each with a dark streak, and a wingspan of 4 cm (1.6 in). The abdomen is red or, more rarely, yellow. Males have four large, grey-colored coremata behind them, which can exceed the length of the abdomen when inflated.

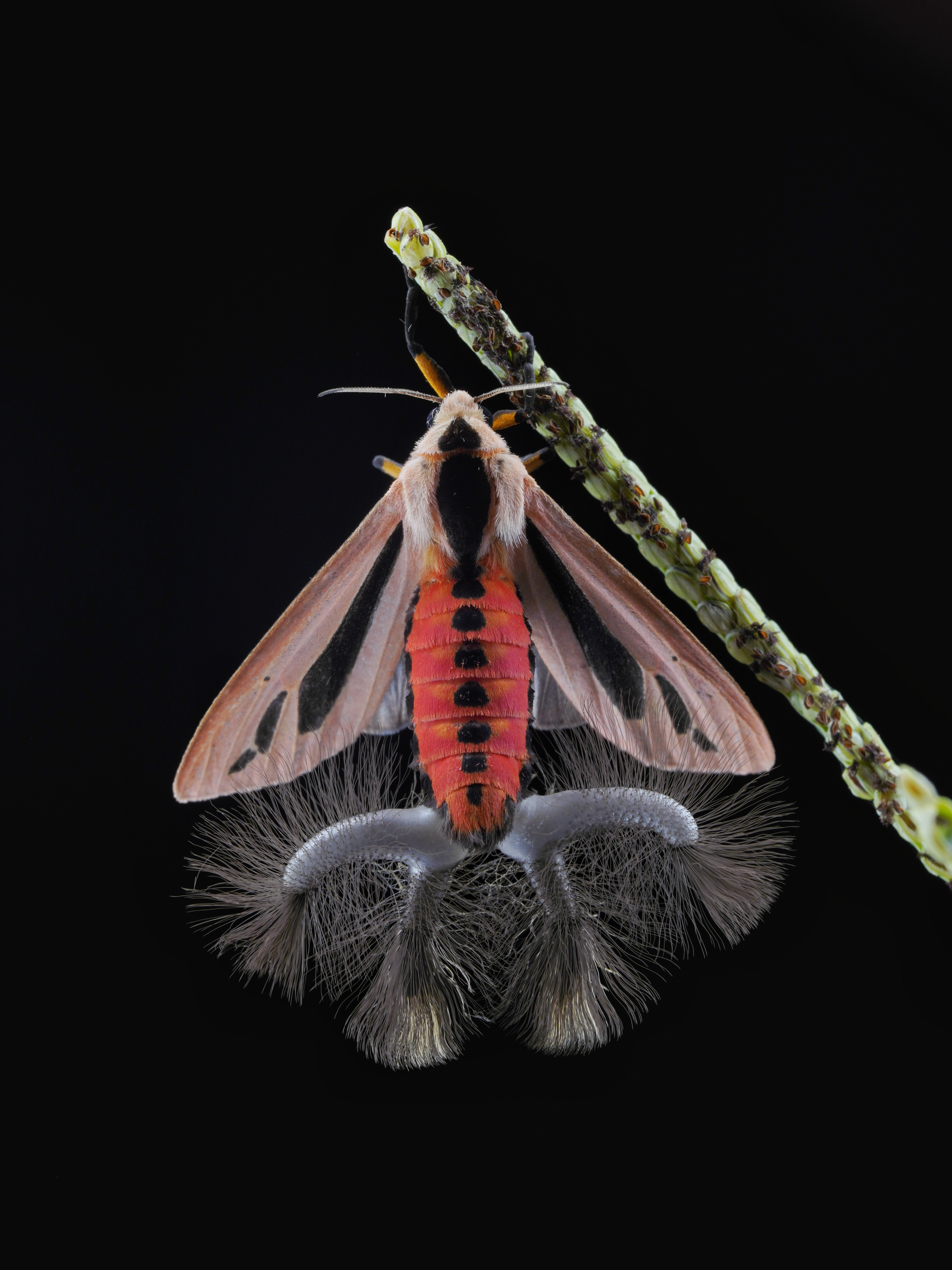
An adult male with its coremata inflated. This male has relatively short coremata.

The eggs are yellow and round, and are laid in rows on the leaves of food plants. The caterpillars are brown hairy animals with a yellow stripe along the back, with a polyphagous diet, known as a minor pest which feeds on groundnuts, rice, ragi, sorghum, pearl millet, coffee, sweet potato, and lucerne crops.

In The Fauna of British India, Including Ceylon and Burma: Moths Vol. II, the species (listed as C. interrupta) is described as follows:

Antennae minutely ciliated in both sexes. Head, thorax and fore wing pale pinkish ochreous. Palpi and legs smoky black, the femora yellow; a broad dorsal band on thorax; abdomen crimson above, with dorsal and lateral series of black spots. Fore wing with a broad black fascia below median nervure; two black spots at end of cell, and a broad streak beyond the lower angle. Hind wing pale or dark fuscous; some specimens with a sub-marginal series of black spots. The variety continuatus has additional black streaks on the fore wing below the costa, in cell, above inner margin, and in the marginal interspaces, but all the intergrades occur. Larva black, sparsely clothes with long hairs; head marked with white; a yellow dorsal line with a series of orange spots on it; prolegs pale.

— The Fauna of British India, Including Ceylon and Burma: Moths Vol. II

== Distribution ==
Creatonotos gangis lives in South East Asia and parts of Australia. Its Asian distribution includes eastern Indonesia, India, Iran, Sri Lanka, China, Japan, Thailand and New Guinea. In Australia, it is restricted to northern parts of Western Australia, Northern Territory and Queensland, extending as far south as Mackay.

== Ecology ==
Adult males secrete the pheromone hydroxydanaidal in order to attract mates. The amount produced, and the size of the coremata which produce it, are however dependent on the diet that the moth experienced as a caterpillar. If the larval diet contained pyrrolizidine alkaloids, then the coremata become large and the male will release up to 400 micrograms (0.4 milligrams) of hydroxydanaidal, but if it does not, then the coremata do not grow large and no scent is produced.

The larvae of C. gangis can cause extensive damage to the foliage of pomegranate trees.

== See also ==
- Pyrrolizidine alkaloid sequestration
