= Thomas Hartmann =

Thomas Hartmann or Hartman may refer to:

- Thomas de Hartmann (1885–1956), Russian composer and associate of George Ivanovitch Gurdjieff
- Thomas Hartmann (biologist) (1937–2017), German pharmaceutical biologist and ecologist
- Thomas W. Hartmann, American lawyer and officer in the United States Air Force Reserve
- Thom Hartmann (born 1951), American broadcaster and author
- Thomas E. Hartman, physicist, discoverer of the Hartman effect
- Monsignor Tom Hartman, co-host of The God Squad
- Tom Hartman, a character on the American soap opera parody Mary Hartman, Mary Hartman
- Thomas Hartmann (footballer) (born 1967), Swiss football striker
