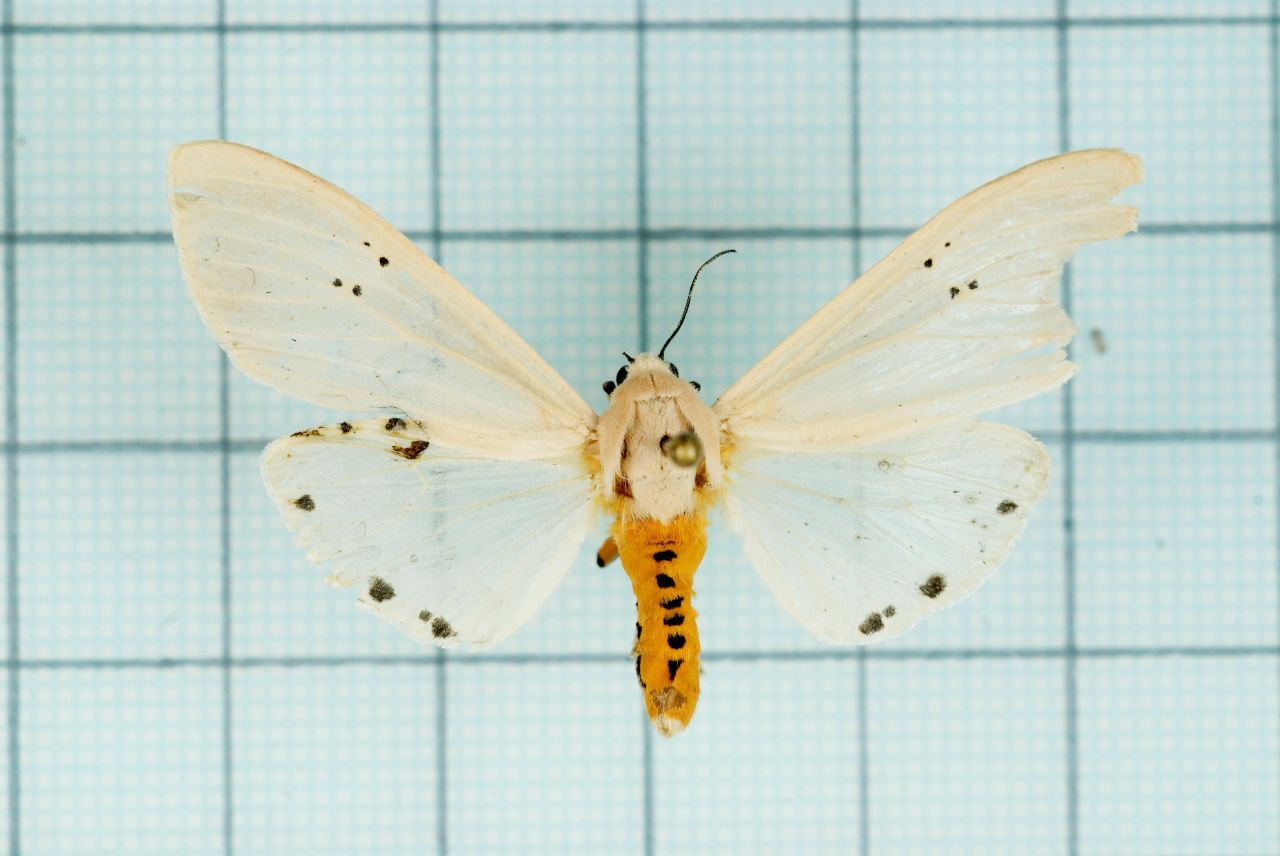
- Creatonotos transiens vacillans

Scientific classification
- Kingdom: Animalia
- Phylum: Arthropoda
- Class: Insecta
- Order: Lepidoptera
- Superfamily: Noctuoidea
- Family: Erebidae
- Subfamily: Arctiinae
- Genus: Creatonotos
- Species: C. transiens

Binomial name
- Creatonotos transiens (Walker, 1855)

Synonyms
- Spilosoma transiens Walker, 1855; Aloa isabellina Walker, 1855; Amphissa vacillans Walker, 1855; Creatonotus koni Miyake, 1909; Creatonotos ananthakrishanani Kirti & Kaleka, 1999

= Creatonotos transiens =

Species of moth

Creatonotos transiens is a species of moth in the family Erebidae. The species was first scientifically described by Francis Walker in 1855.

== Distribution ==
C. transiens is found in China (Shanxi, Shaanxi, central China, Tibet, Yunnan, Sichuan, Hong Kong, Hainan, Guizhou, Hubei, Hunan, Zhejiang, Fujian), Taiwan, Japan (Ryukyu), eastern Afghanistan, Pakistan, India, Bangladesh, Nepal, Bhutan, Myanmar, Indochina, Borneo, Bali and Lombok. Records attributed to the Philippines are likely referable to Creatonotos wilemani Rothschild, 1933, as Dubalotov & Holloway noted misplaced wilemani material in The Natural History Museum, London, collections. Records attributed to Sulawesi are referable to Creatonotos kishidai Dubalotov & Holloway, 2007

== Subspecies ==
This list follows Holloway's interpretation from Moths of Borneo, part 6, as updated in Dubalotov & Holloway ([2006], 2007)

- Creatonotos transiens transiens (India, northern Pakistan)
- Creatonotos transiens albina (Daniel, 1971) (Afghanistan)
- Creatonotos transiens koni Miyaki, 1909 (Taiwan, Japan (Ryukyu Is.)) (revived from synonymy with vacillans by Dubalotov & Holloway ([2006], 2007))
- Creatonotos transiens vacillans (Walker, 1855) (=Creatonotos transiens orientalis Nakamura, 1976) (mainland China, Hong Kong, mainland South East Asia, Sumatra, Borneo))
- Creatonotos transiens sundana Nakamura, 1976 (Siberut, Java, Bali east to Lombok)

== Ecology ==
Adults of C. transiens can be found in various secondary habitats. Males of several Creatonotos species, including C. transiens possess inflatable coremata for dispersing pheromones prior to courtship of females; pheromone release and courtship take place within a couple of hours after sunset.

The larvae feed on a wide range of plants, including Beta, Dioscorea, Paspalum, Zea, Pithecellobium, Vigna, Wisteria, Toona, Musa, Salix, Cayratia and Cissus species. The larvae are dark brown, with a very pale yellow dorsal stripe.
