= Skalička =

Skalička may refer to:

== Places in the Czech Republic ==
- Skalička (Brno-Country District), a municipality and village in the South Moravian Region
- Skalička (Přerov District), a municipality and village in the Olomouc Region
- Skalička, a village and part of Skalice (Hradec Králové District) in the Hradec Králové Region

== Surname ==
- Karel Skalička (1896–1979), Czech-Argentinian chess master
- Vladimír Skalička (1909–1991), Czech linguist
