= Pyrrolizidine alkaloid sequestration =

Pyrrolizidine alkaloid sequestration by insects is a strategy to facilitate defense and mating. Various species of insects have been known to use molecular compounds from plants for their own defense and even as their pheromones or precursors to their pheromones. A few Lepidoptera have been found to sequester chemicals from plants which they retain throughout their life and some members of Erebidae are examples of this phenomenon. Starting in the mid-twentieth century researchers investigated various members of Arctiidae, and how these insects sequester pyrrolizidine alkaloids (PAs) during their life stages, and use these chemicals as adults for pheromones or pheromone precursors. PAs are also used by members of the Arctiidae for defense against predators throughout the life of the insect.

== Overview ==
Pyrrolizidine alkaloids are a group of chemicals produced by plants as secondary metabolites, all of which contain a pyrrolizidine nucleus. This nucleus is made up of two pyrrole rings bonded by one carbon and one nitrogen. There are two forms in which PAs can exist and will readily interchange between: a pro-toxic free base form, also called a tertiary amine, or in a non-toxic form of N-oxide.

Researchers have collected data that strongly suggests that PAs can be registered by taste receptors of predators, acting as a deterrent from being ingested. Taste receptors are also used by the various moth species that sequester PAs, which often stimulates them to feed. As of 2005, all of the PA sequestering insects that have been studied have all evolved a system to keep concentrations of the PA pro-toxic form low within the insect's tissues.

Researchers have found a number of Arctiidae that use PAs for protection and for male pheromones or precursors of the male pheromones, and some studies have found evidence suggesting PAs have behavioral and developmental effects. Estigmene acrea, Cosmosoma myrodora, Utetheisa ornatrix, Creatonotos gangis and Creatonotos transiens are all members of the family Arctiidae and found to use PAs for their defense and/or male pheromones. Parsimony suggests that the sequestering of PAs in the larval stage evolved in the subfamily Arctiinae common ancestor. The loss of ability to sequester and use PAs has occurred in a number of species, along with the switch from larval uptake to adult uptake of PAs occurring multiple times within the Arctiinae taxon.

Members of Arctiidae typically sequester PAs from their diets, but sometimes must specifically ingest fluids excreted by plants that are not a part of their diets. Sequestered PAs are kept in various tissues and varying concentration which is dependent upon the species. PAs are found in the cuticle of all studied Arctiidae mentioned here, but some also package these chemicals into their spermatophores as seen in Creatonotos gangis and Creatonotos transiens. The display of PAs on the exoskeleton is believed to cue predators to the unpalatability of the prey.

Eisner and Eisner looked at the palatability of PA positive and negative U. ornatrix to wolf spiders, Lycosa ceratiola, in both the larval form and adult form. They found that the pyrrolizidine-positive organisms were typically released unharmed by spiders except in two field circumstances where the larvae were probably envenomated prior to the spider's release and died two days after the attack. All of the PA-negative organisms were eaten by spiders. These findings were in line with prior studies done by Eisner and Meinwald which looked at orb weavers and U. ornatrix, along with spiders being fed beetle larva covered in PAs, which they rejected. All of these findings support PAs being used for defense against predation.

Studies have further elucidated the defenses and uses of PAs in Arctiidae. One study researched C. myrodora and how PAs protect this species from spider predation among other things. It found that PAs ingested from fluids excreted by plants aided in defense from predation. All organisms permitted access to PA-containing diets that were fed to spiders were cut loose from the webs. Females that had PA-deprived diets, but were allowed to mate with PA-positive males, were also released from the spider's webs. Further observations showed that male C. myrodora have a pair of pouches where they produce PA-laden filaments, which are typically released over the female prior to copulation as a nuptial gift. Experiments show that the filaments give the females more PAs, explaining why spiders released mated PA-negative females from their webs. Most of the PAs from the males were subsequently transferred to the eggs when deposited. Three clusters of eggs that were laid after copulation with a PA-positive male all tested positive for alkaloids and the one cluster that resulted from a PA-negative male copulation tested negative. By the eggs getting a dose of PAs, the authors suggest that the eggs are being protected from predators such as Coccinellidae beetles.

Jordan and others’ study found a very interesting effect of the larval ingestion of PAs. Male Estigmene acrea moths that consumed PAs in their diet as larvae produced hydroxydanaidal, a volatile PA compound, and displayed their coremata: a bifid, inflatable male-specific organ, used in dispersing pheromones in the adult stage. Larvae that were fed diets without PAs rarely displayed their coremata and did not produce hydroxydanaidal. E. acrea have been observed in the wild displaying their coremata, an activity which attracts both males and females and is known as lekking. Lekking was described by Willis and Birch in 1982, but larvae raised in the laboratory prior to this study rarely engaged in lekking or corematal displays. Scientists were unsure of why this phenomenon didn't occur in the lab, but laboratory raised larvae were usually reared on commercially available food which lacks PAs. The authors suggest that the PAs are used by the males to attract other moths by releasing the volatile PA hydroxydanaidal into the air. It is suggested in this study that this strategy of mate attraction came about by tapping into the PA affinity already programmed into the moths for feeding, which is further supported by the observation that E. acrea females release their pheromones a little bit later in the evening than the males.

Similar uses of coremata to attract other moths have been observed in C. gangis and C. transiens along with altered development of coremata when larvae are reared without PAs. Boppre and Schneider observed adult males of these two species that were not permitted to eat PAs. Their coremata only developed into two, stalk-like projections with very few hairs arising from these stalks. Males that were given plants that produced PAs to feed upon, developed long coremata with four tubes, each longer than the males body, and each tube was highly pubescent. The authors suggest from this observation that there is a basic corematal phenotype, the two stalked coremata, and that PAs are required to form full coremata which is much larger and more elaborate than the basic corematal expression. These observations were further investigated by feeding larvae different amounts of PAs which had a direct correlation to the development of the coremata, which reached a maximum plateau around 2 mg of PAs ingested while in larval form. Similar to Jordan and others’ findings, the males raised on a diet devoid of PAs did not produce hydroxydanaidal.
