= Skalka =

Skalka (little rock in Czech and Slovak) may refer to:

In the Czech Republic:

- Skalka (Prague Metro), a Prague Metro station of Line A
- Skalka (Hazlov), a village in Karlovy Vary Region
- Skalka (Hodonín District), a village and municipality in Hodonín District in the South Moravian Region
- Skalka (Prostějov District), a village and municipality in Prostějov District in the Olomouc Region
- Skalka u Doks, a village and municipality in Česká Lípa District in the Liberec Region
- Skalka castle (Litoměřice District), a complex of castle tower and chateau in the village Vlastislav near the town Lovosice in the northern Bohemia
- Skalka castle (Rychnov nad Kněžnou District), a castle in the village of Podbřezí, in the Hradec Králové Region

In Slovakia:

- Skalka nad Váhom, a village and municipality in Trenčín District in the Trenčín Region
- Púchov-Skalka, see Púchov culture
- Skalka (hill), a hill in Kremnica Mountains
  - Skalka pri Kremnici, a ski resort
  - Suchá Hora transmitter, a radio and TV transmitter on the hill

== See also ==
- Skála
- Skalice (disambiguation)
