= Creatonotos perineti =

Scientific classification
- Domain: Eukaryota
- Kingdom: Animalia
- Phylum: Arthropoda
- Class: Insecta
- Order: Lepidoptera
- Superfamily: Noctuoidea
- Family: Erebidae
- Subfamily: Arctiinae
- Genus: Creatonotos
- Species: C. perineti

Binomial name
- Creatonotos perineti Rothschild, 1933

Species of moth

Creatonotos perineti is a moth of the family Erebidae. It was described by Rothschild in 1933. It is found in Madagascar.
