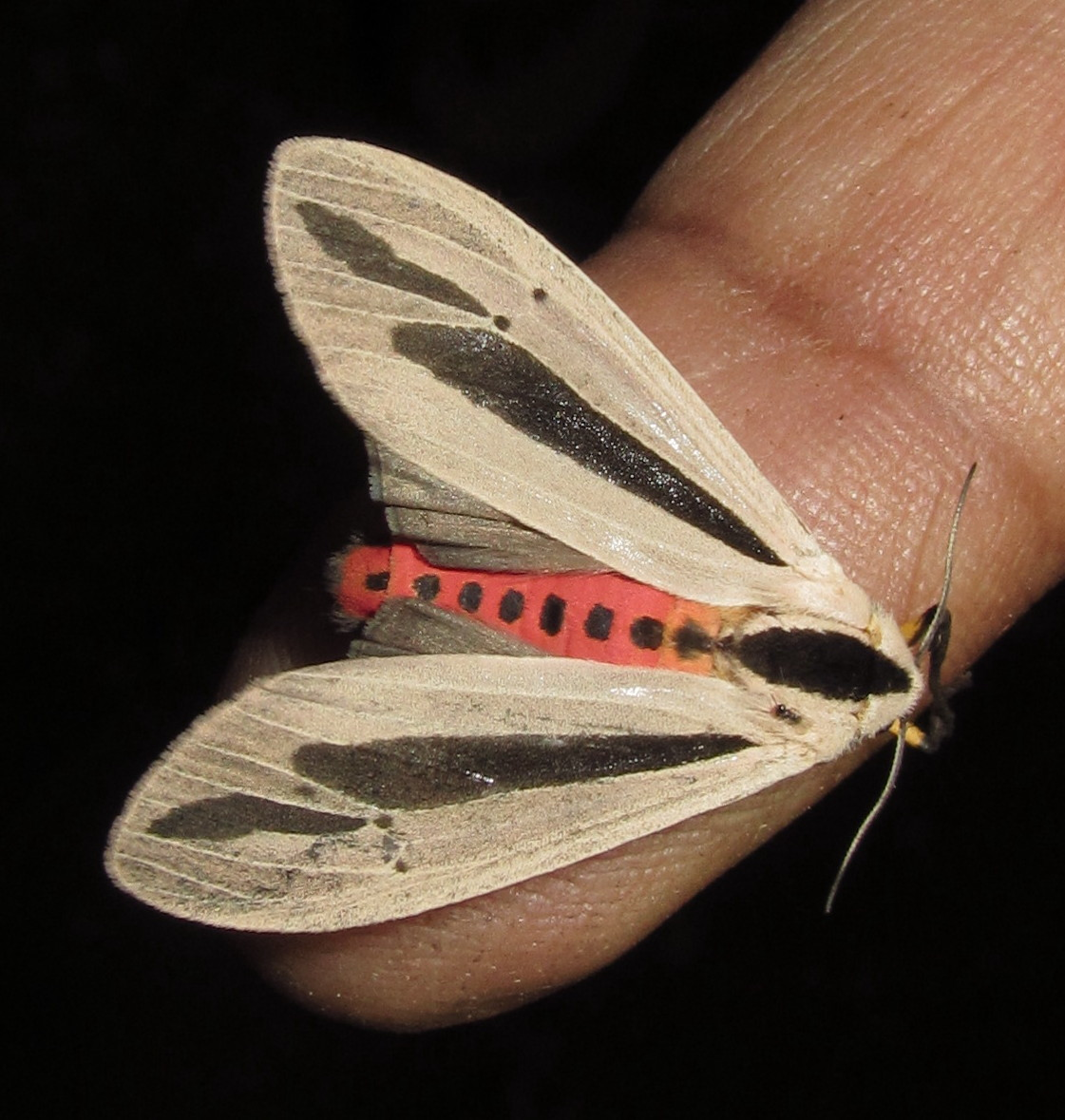
- Creatonotos gangis

Scientific classification
- Kingdom: Animalia
- Phylum: Arthropoda
- Clade: Pancrustacea
- Class: Insecta
- Order: Lepidoptera
- Superfamily: Noctuoidea
- Family: Erebidae
- Subfamily: Arctiinae
- Subtribe: Spilosomina
- Genus: Creatonotos; Hübner, 1819

Type species
- Phalaena interrupta Linnaeus, 1767

Synonyms
- Amphissa Walker, 1855; Phissama Moore, [1860]

= Creatonotos =

Genus of moths

Creatonotos is a genus of tiger moths in the family Erebidae. The moths in the genus are found in the Afrotropics, South and East Asia, Sundaland and Australia.

== Description ==
"Palpi short and porrect. Hind tibiae with one pair of spurs. Fore wing rather narrow. Venation as in Spilosoma. Fore wing in some specimens with vein 10 from cell, and vein 5 in both wings sometimes from above angle of cell."

== Species ==
The genus contains the following species:

=== Creatonotos sensu stricto ===
- Creatonotos gangis (Linnaeus, 1763)
- Creatonotos interrupta (Linnaeus, 1767)
- Creatonotos leucanioides Holland, 1893
  - Creatonotos leucanioides albidior Wiltshire, 1986
- Creatonotos omanirana de Freina, 2007
- Creatonotos fasciatus (Candèze, 1927)
  - Cretonotos fasciatus pljustshi Dubatolov, 2010
- Creatonotos perineti Rothschild, 1933
- Creatonotos punctivitta (Walker, 1855)

=== Subgenus Phissama Moore, [1860] 1858-1859 ===
- Creatonotos kishidai Dubatolov & Holloway, 2007
- Creatonotos transiens (Walker, 1855)
  - Creatonotos transiens albina (Daniel, 1971)
  - Creatonotos transiens koni Miyake, 1909
  - Creatonotos transiens sundana Nakamura, 1976
  - Creatonotos transiens vacillans (Walker, 1855)
- Creatonotos wilemani Rothschild, 1933
