= Creatonotos interrupta =

Scientific classification
- Kingdom: Animalia
- Phylum: Arthropoda
- Class: Insecta
- Order: Lepidoptera
- Superfamily: Noctuoidea
- Family: Erebidae
- Subfamily: Arctiinae
- Genus: Creatonotos
- Species: C. interrupta

Binomial name
- Creatonotos interrupta (Linnaeus, 1767)

Synonyms
- Phalaena interrupta Linnaeus, 1767; Bombyx francisca Fabricius, 1787

Species of moth

Creatonotos interrupta is a moth of the family Erebidae. It was described by Carl Linnaeus in his 1767 12th edition of Systema Naturae. It is often listed as a synonym of Creatonotos gangis, but the identity is unclear.

In The Fauna of British India, Including Ceylon and Burma: Moths Vol. II, the species is described as follows:

Head, thorax and fore wing pale pinkish ochreous. Palpi and legs smoky black, the femora yellow; a broad dorsal band on thorax; abdomen crimson above, with dorsal and lateral series of black spots. Fore wing with a broad black fascia below median nervure; two black spots at end of cell, and a broad streak beyond the lower angle. Hind wing pale or dark fuscous; some specimens with a sub-marginal series of black spots. The variety continuatus has additional black streaks on the fore wing below the costa, in cell, above inner margin, and in the marginal interspaces, but all the intergrades occur. Larva black, sparsely clothes with long hairs; head marked with white; a yellow dorsal line with a series of orange spots on it; prolegs pale.
