= Creatonotos punctivitta =

Scientific classification
- Kingdom: Animalia
- Phylum: Arthropoda
- Class: Insecta
- Order: Lepidoptera
- Superfamily: Noctuoidea
- Family: Erebidae
- Subfamily: Arctiinae
- Genus: Creatonotos
- Species: C. punctivitta

Binomial name
- Creatonotos punctivitta (Walker, 1855)

Synonyms
- Spilosoma punctivitta Walker, 1855; Creatonotos leucanioides notivitta Pinhey, 1975; Creatonotos punctivitta ab. notivitta Strand, 1915

Species of moth

Creatonotos punctivitta is a moth of the family Erebidae. It was described by Francis Walker in 1855. It is found in the Democratic Republic of the Congo, Nigeria, South Africa, Sudan, Tanzania and Zambia.
