= Creatonotos leucanioides =

Scientific classification
- Kingdom: Animalia
- Phylum: Arthropoda
- Clade: Pancrustacea
- Class: Insecta
- Order: Lepidoptera
- Superfamily: Noctuoidea
- Family: Erebidae
- Subfamily: Arctiinae
- Genus: Creatonotos
- Species: C. leucanioides

Binomial name
- Creatonotos leucanioides Holland, 1893

Synonyms
- Creatonotos brunnipennis Bartel, 1903; Creatonotos albidior Wiltshire, 1986; Creatonotos leucanioides ab. defasciata Strand, 1919

Species of moth

Creatonotos leucanioides is a moth of the family Erebidae. It was described by William Jacob Holland in 1893. It is found in Angola, Burkina Faso, Burundi, Cameroon, the Central African Republic, the Republic of the Congo, the Democratic Republic of the Congo, Ethiopia, Gabon, Ghana, Ivory Coast, Kenya, Liberia, Nigeria, Saudi Arabia, Sierra Leone, Sudan, Tanzania, the Gambia, Uganda, Yemen, and Zambia.

The larvae feed on various grasses, including Crotalaria and Capsicum species.

== Subspecies ==
- Creatonotos leucanioides leucanioides
- Creatonotos leucanioides albidior Wiltshire, 1986 (Ethiopia, Saudi Arabia, Yemen)
