= Creatonotos omanirana =

Scientific classification
- Domain: Eukaryota
- Kingdom: Animalia
- Phylum: Arthropoda
- Class: Insecta
- Order: Lepidoptera
- Superfamily: Noctuoidea
- Family: Erebidae
- Subfamily: Arctiinae
- Genus: Creatonotos
- Species: C. omanirana

Binomial name
- Creatonotos omanirana de Freina, 2007

Species of moth

Creatonotos omanirana is a moth of the family Erebidae. It was described by Josef J. de Freina in 2007. It is found in Oman, the United Arab Emirates and Iran.

The length of the forewings is 16–22 mm for males and 18–22.5 mm for females. The larvae are polyphagous, but prefer Taraxacum species.

== Etymology ==
The species is named for the country from which it was described.
