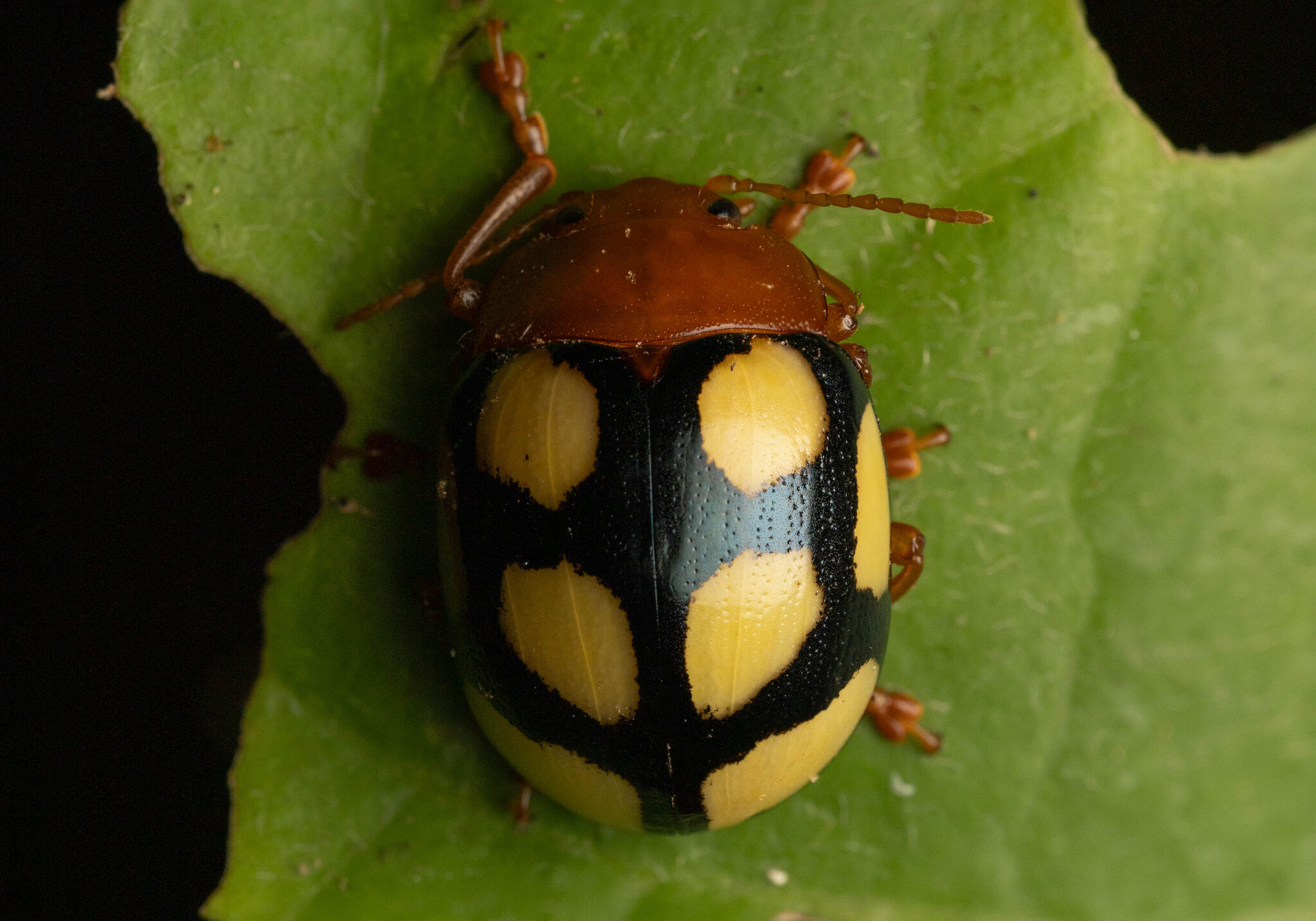

Scientific classification
- Kingdom: Animalia
- Phylum: Arthropoda
- Clade: Pancrustacea
- Class: Insecta
- Order: Coleoptera
- Suborder: Polyphaga
- Infraorder: Cucujiformia
- Family: Chrysomelidae
- Genus: Platyphora
- Species: P. testudo

Binomial name
- Platyphora testudo De Mey, 1838

= Platyphora testudo =

Species of beetle

Platyphora testudo is a species of broad-shouldered leaf beetles belonging to the Chrysomelidae family. This species can be found in Panama and Ecuador.
