= Creatonotos fasciatus =

Scientific classification
- Kingdom: Animalia
- Phylum: Arthropoda
- Class: Insecta
- Order: Lepidoptera
- Superfamily: Noctuoidea
- Family: Erebidae
- Subfamily: Arctiinae
- Genus: Creatonotos
- Species: C. fasciatus

Binomial name
- Creatonotos fasciatus L. Candèze, 1927

Species of moth

Creatonotos fasciatus is a moth of the family Erebidae. It was described by L. Candèze in 1927. It is found in Cambodia, Laos and China (Hong Kong).

The length of the forewings is about 18.5 mm for males and 19 mm for females.

== Subspecies ==
- Creatonotos fasciatus fasciatus (Cambodia)
- Creatonotos fasciatus pljustshi Dubatolov, 2010 (Laos, Hong Kong)
