= Skalice (Tábor District) =

- Municipality
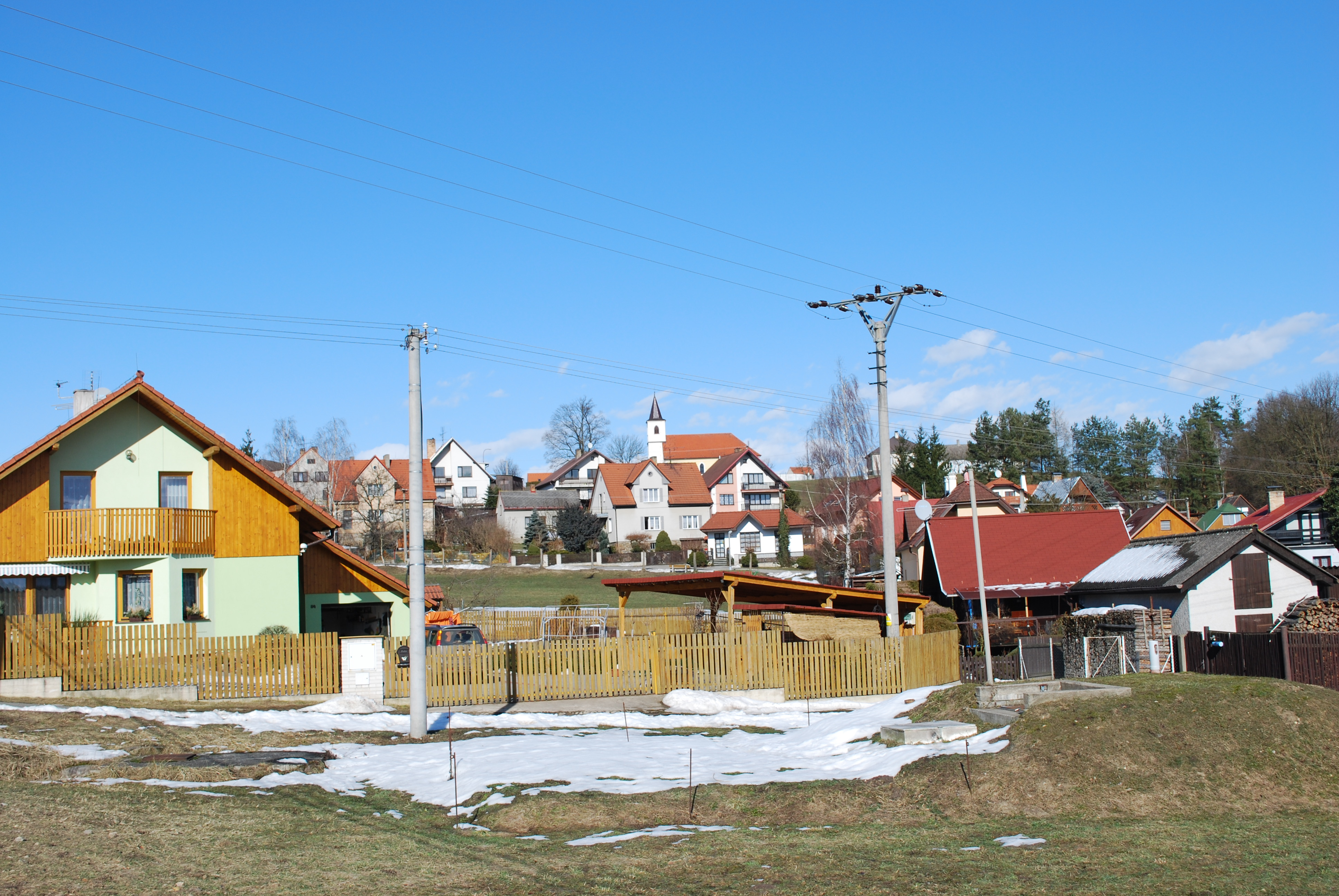
- View from the south

- Location in the Czech Republic
- Coordinates: 49°18′12″N 14°41′43″E
- Country: Czech Republic
- Region: South Bohemian
- District: Tábor
- First mentioned: 1265

Area
  - Total: 15.08 km^{2} (5.82 sq mi)
- Elevation: 430 m (1,410 ft)

Population (2026-01-01)
  - Total: 535
  - Density: 35.5/km^{2} (91.9/sq mi)
- Time zone: UTC+1 (CET)
  - Summer (DST): UTC+2 (CEST)
- Postal code: 392 01
- Website: www.obecskalice.cz

Skalice is a municipality and village in Tábor District in the South Bohemian Region of the Czech Republic. It has about 500 inhabitants.

Skalice lies approximately 12 kilometres (7 mi) south of Tábor, 41 km (25 mi) north-east of České Budějovice, and 89 km (55 mi) south of Prague.

== Administrative division ==
Skalice consists of four municipal parts (in brackets population according to the 2021 census):

- Skalice (231)
- Radimov (43)
- Rybova Lhota (122)
- Třebiště (85)

== Demographics ==
Historical population
| Year | Pop. | ±% |
|---|---|---|
| 1869 | 654 | — |
| 1880 | 750 | +14.7% |
| 1890 | 697 | −7.1% |
| 1900 | 745 | +6.9% |
| 1910 | 747 | +0.3% |
| 1921 | 709 | −5.1% |
| 1930 | 678 | −4.4% |
| 1950 | 561 | −17.3% |
| 1961 | 546 | −2.7% |
| 1970 | 515 | −5.7% |
| 1980 | 456 | −11.5% |
| 1991 | 440 | −3.5% |
| 2001 | 448 | +1.8% |
| 2011 | 462 | +3.1% |
| 2021 | 481 | +4.1% |
Source: Censuses
