= Creatonotos kishidai =

Scientific classification
- Kingdom: Animalia
- Phylum: Arthropoda
- Clade: Pancrustacea
- Class: Insecta
- Order: Lepidoptera
- Superfamily: Noctuoidea
- Family: Erebidae
- Subfamily: Arctiinae
- Genus: Creatonotos
- Species: C. kishidai

Binomial name
- Creatonotos kishidai Dubatolov & Holloway, 2007

Species of moth

Creatonotos kishidai is a moth of the family Erebidae. It was described by Vladimir Viktorovitch Dubatolov and Jeremy Daniel Holloway in 2007. It is found on Sulawesi.

The wingspan is 41–46 mm for males and 43–49 mm for females. The wings of the males are dark grey, the forewing with a lighter costal margin and veins on the external part of the wing. The female forewings are light grey with lighter veins in the external part of the wing.
