= Klášterní Skalice =

- Municipality
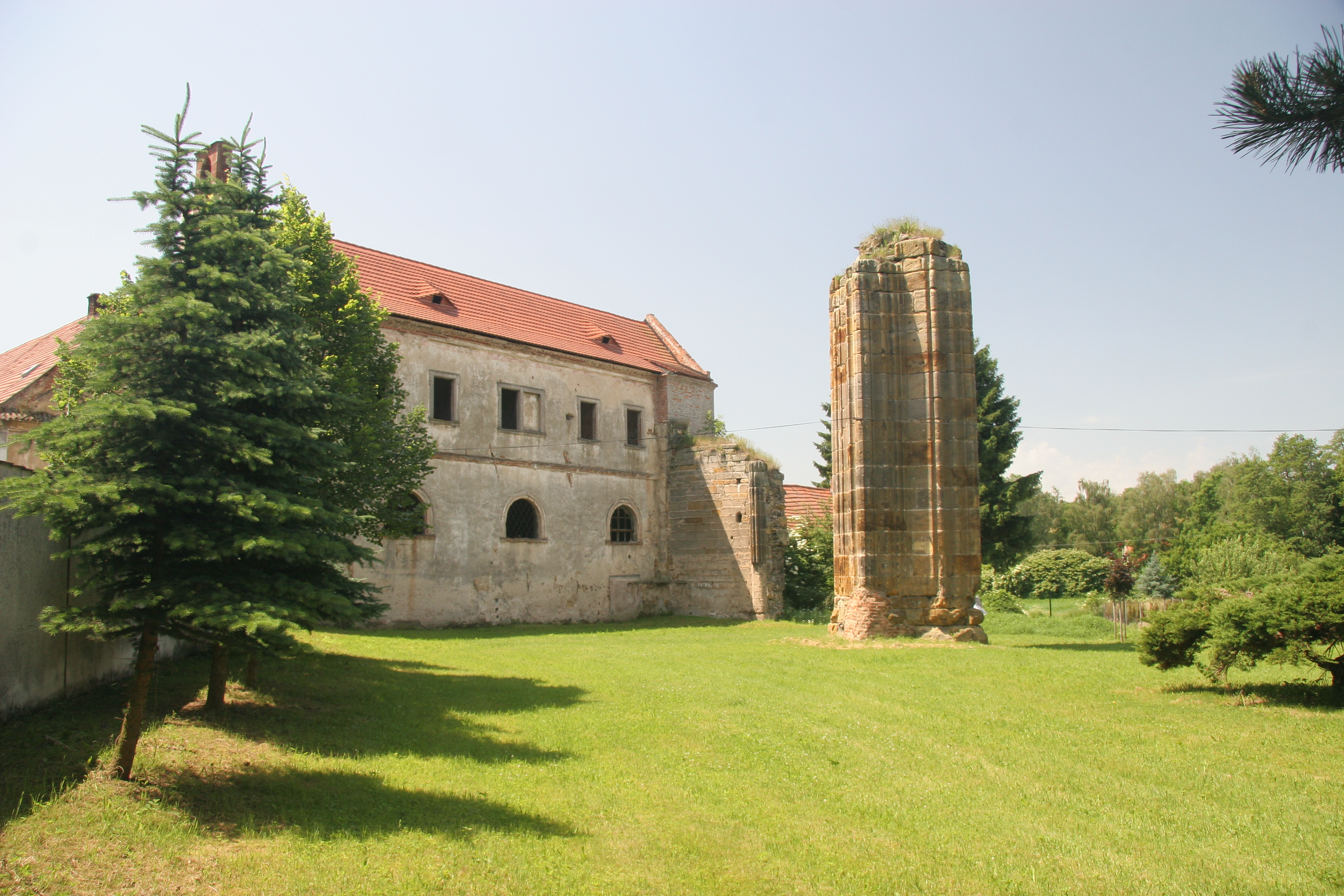
- Ruins of a monastery

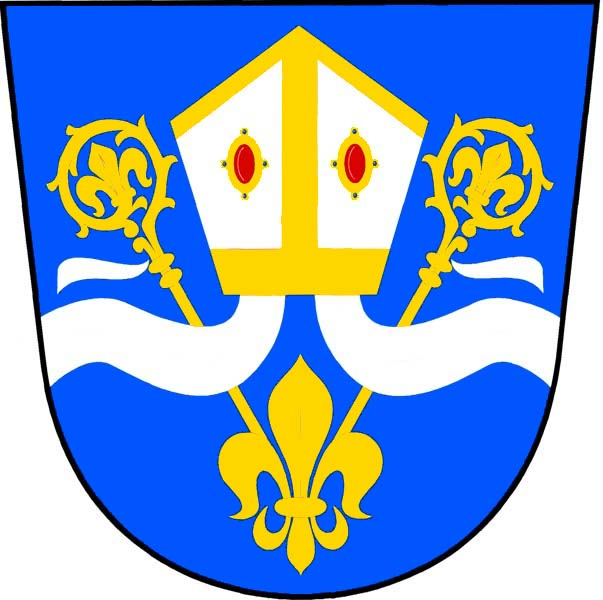
- Flag Coat of arms

- Location in the Czech Republic
- Coordinates: 50°1′25″N 14°59′7″E
- Country: Czech Republic
- Region: Central Bohemian
- District: Kolín
- First mentioned: 1345

Area
  - Total: 3.33 km^{2} (1.29 sq mi)
- Elevation: 226 m (741 ft)

Population (2026-01-01)
  - Total: 130
  - Density: 39/km^{2} (100/sq mi)
- Time zone: UTC+1 (CET)
  - Summer (DST): UTC+2 (CEST)
- Postal code: 281 63
- Website: www.klasterniskalice.cz

Klášterní Skalice is a municipality and village in Kolín District in the Central Bohemian Region of the Czech Republic. It has about 100 inhabitants.

== Demographics ==
Historical population
Year	Pop.	±%
1869	181	—
1880	205	+13.3%
1890	218	+6.3%
1900	216	−0.9%
1910	216	+0.0%
1921	229	+6.0%
1930	242	+5.7%
1950	190	−21.5%
1961	185	−2.6%
1970	165	−10.8%
1980	152	−7.9%
1991	119	−21.7%
2001	113	−5.0%
2011	127	+12.4%
2021	123	−3.1%
Source: Censuses
