= Homospermidine synthase =

Enzyme

Identifiers
- EC no.: 2.5.1.44
- CAS no.: 76106-84-8

Databases
- BRENDA: enzyme data
- ExPASy: NiceZyme view
- KEGG: enzyme entry
- MetaCyc: metabolic pathway
- Rhea: reactions
- PDB structures: RCSB PDB PDBe PDBsum
Search
- PMC: articles
- PubMed: articles
- NCBI: proteins

Homospermidine synthase (EC 2.5.1.44) is an enzyme with systematic name putrescine:putrescine 4-aminobutyltransferase (ammonia-forming). It was first characterised from Rhodopseudomonas viridis and catalyses two related chemical reactions. One converts two molecules of putrescine to one of sym-homospermidine, with ammonia as a byproduct:

2
putrescine
NH_{3}
sym-homospermidine

The other combines putrescine with spermidine to form sym-homospermidine and 1,3-propanediamine:

putrescine
+
spermidine
sym-homospermidine
+
1,3-diaminopropane

The enzyme has been found in Acinetobacter tartarogenes and Lathyrus sativus. There is evidence that it evolved from the enzyme deoxyhypusine synthase and that it is part of the biosynthetic pathway to pyrrolizidine alkaloids. In many bacteria, it is an essential part of the metabolism of polyamines.
