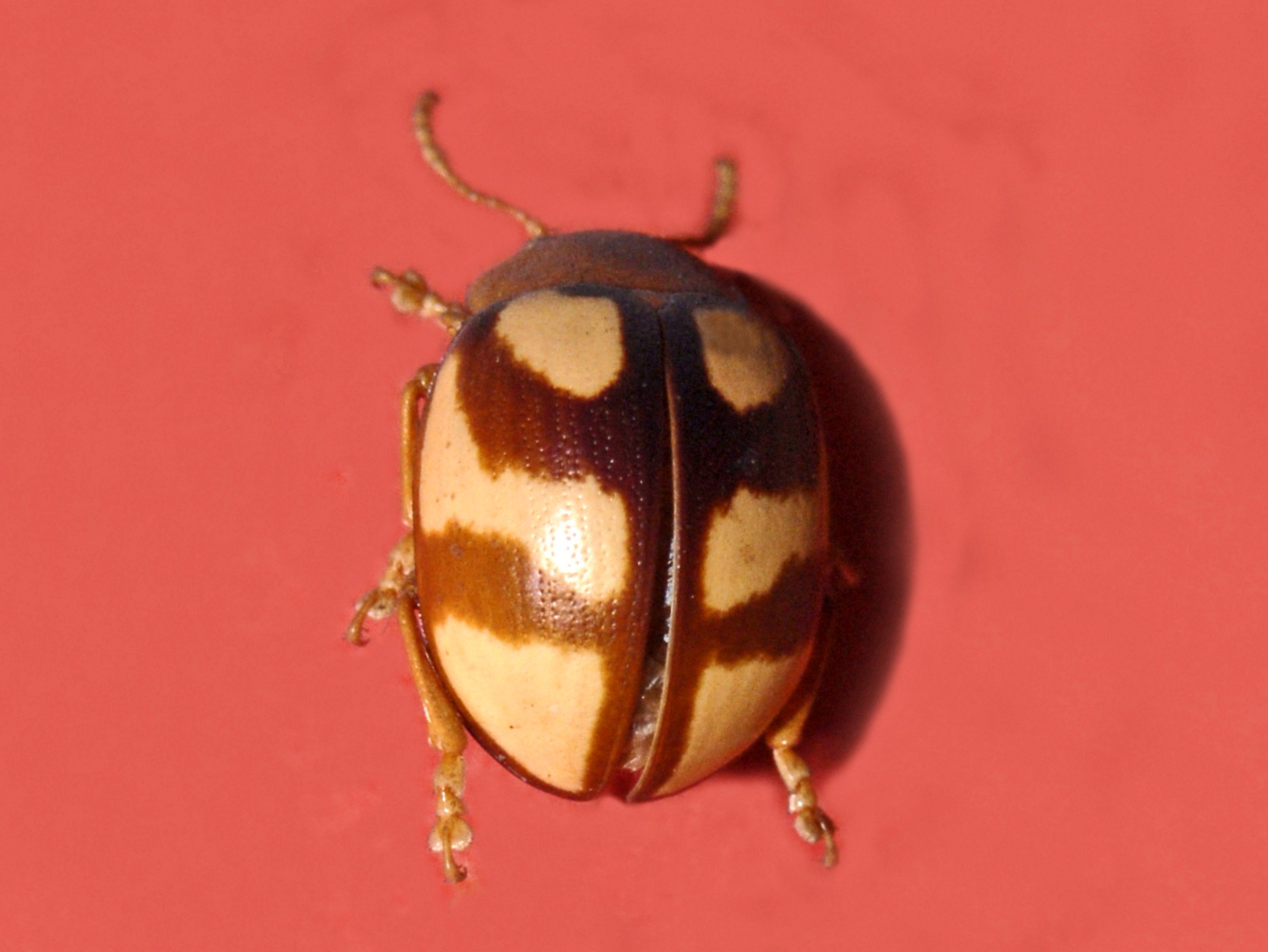
- Museum specimen of Platyphora testudo

Scientific classification
- Kingdom: Animalia
- Phylum: Arthropoda
- Clade: Pancrustacea
- Class: Insecta
- Order: Coleoptera
- Suborder: Polyphaga
- Infraorder: Cucujiformia
- Family: Chrysomelidae
- Subfamily: Chrysomelinae
- Genus: Platyphora; Gistel, 1857

Type species
- Doryphora histrio Olivier, 1807

Synonyms
- Antirrhosterna Motschulsky, 1860; Biogramma Motschulsky, 1860; Cardiodora Motschulsky, 1860; Doryprosopa Motschulsky, 1860; Homalodora Motschulsky, 1860; Linostoma Motschulsky, 1860; Metallophora Motschulsky, 1860; Orthodora Motschulsky, 1860; Sphaenosterna Motschulsky, 1860; Stichotaenia Motschulsky, 1860; Doryphorella Achard, 1921; Histrionella Achard, 1924; Pubidora Daccordi, 1994

= Platyphora =

Genus of beetles

Platyphora is a genus of broad-shouldered leaf beetles belonging to the family Chrysomelidae.

These tropical insects usually have bright warning coloration (aposematism) and a chemical protection against predators. The toxins are secondary metabolites collected from the host plants they eat, mainly Boraginaceae, Asteraceae, Asclepiadaceae, Convolvulaceae, Solanaceae and Apocynaceae.

== Selected species ==
- Platyphora alboverins
- Platyphora arangoi
- Platyphora bicolor
- Platyphora biremis
- Platyphora clara
- Platyphora decorata
- Platyphora decurrens
- Platyphora eucosoma
- Platyphora flavoguttata
- Platyphora furthi
- Platyphora guyana
- Platyphora lativittis
- Platyphora lesagei
- Platyphora ligata
- Platyphora macrogramma
- Platyphora microspina
- Platyphora nigroguttata
- Platyphora ocellata
- Platyphora ornata
- Platyphora panamensis
- Platyphora petulans
- Platyphora punctipennis
- Platyphora purulensis
- Platyphora quadrisignata
- Platyphora rileyi
- Platyphora rogersi
- Platyphora salvini
- Platyphora selva
- Platyphora semiviridis
- Platyphora spectabilis
- Platyphora spectanda
- Platyphora testudo
- Platyphora uniformis
- Platyphora vidanoi
