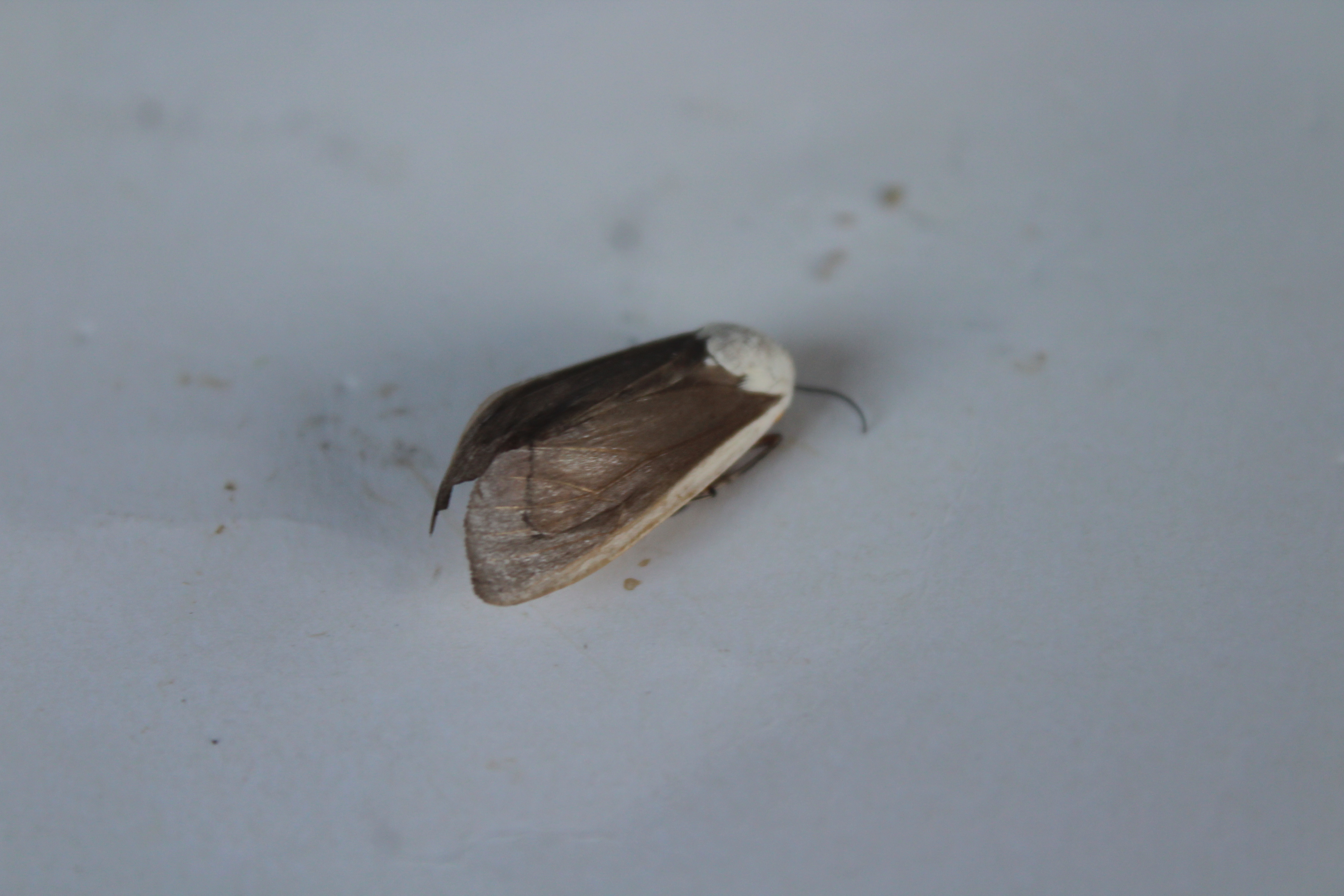
- moth (Ligao city Albay, Philippines)

Scientific classification
- Kingdom: Animalia
- Phylum: Arthropoda
- Class: Insecta
- Order: Lepidoptera
- Superfamily: Noctuoidea
- Family: Erebidae
- Subfamily: Arctiinae
- Genus: Creatonotos
- Species: C. wilemani

Binomial name
- Creatonotos wilemani Rothschild, 1933

Synonyms
- Creatonotos philippinensis Nakamura, 1976

= Creatonotos wilemani =

Species of moth

Creatonotos wilemani is a moth of the family Erebidae. It was described by Walter Rothschild in 1933. It is found on the Philippines, where it has been recorded from Palawan, Luzon, Marinduque, Mindoro, Panay, Negros, Cebu, Samar, Leyte and Mindanao. It is found in primary and secondary habitats, ranging from the lowlands to montane regions.

Adults have been recorded on wing from January to March, in May, July, September and December.
