= Skalička (Brno-Country District) =

- Municipality
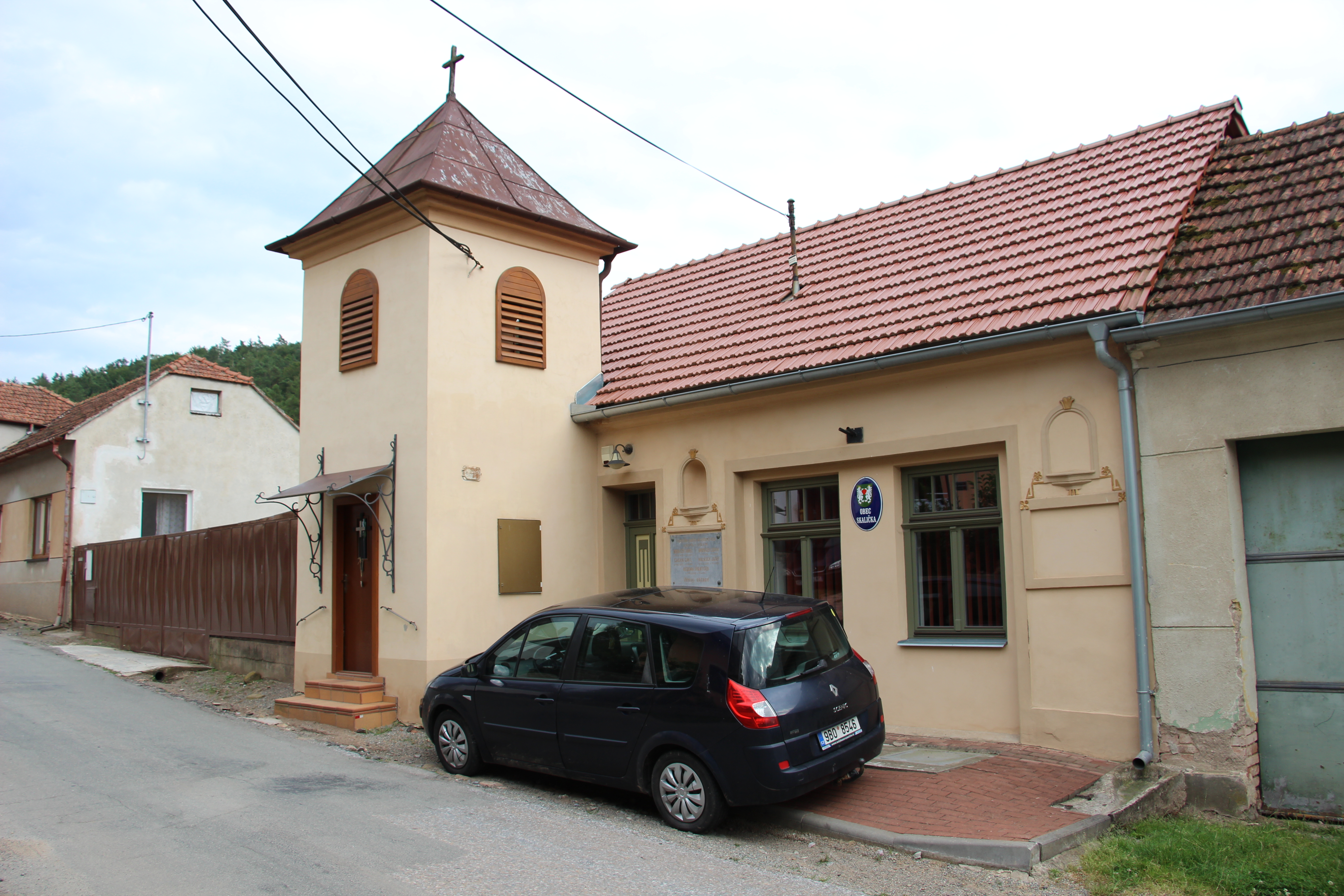
- Municipal office and Chapel of St. Wenceslaus

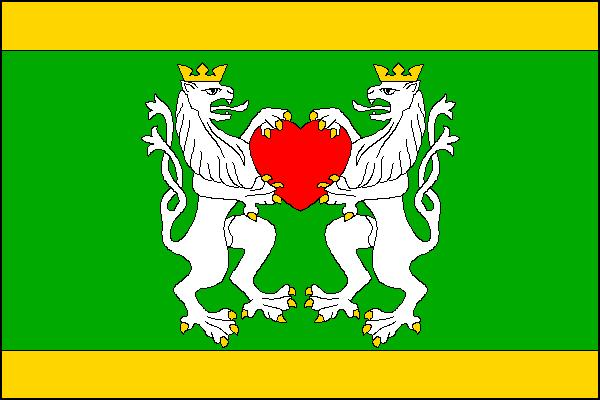
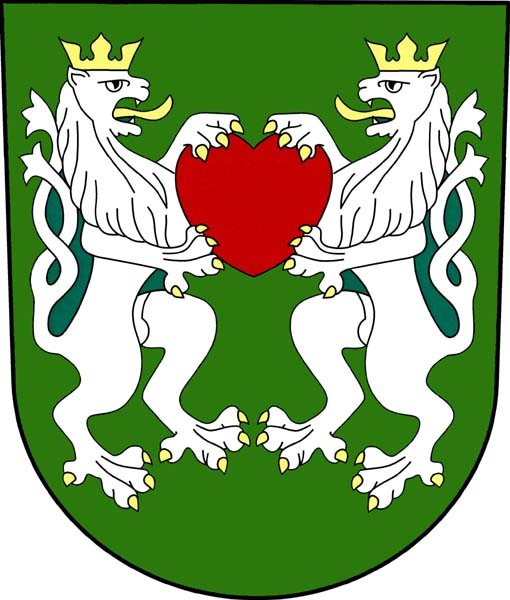
- Flag Coat of arms

- Location in the Czech Republic
- Coordinates: 49°21′28″N 16°30′58″E
- Country: Czech Republic
- Region: South Moravian
- District: Brno-Country
- First mentioned: 1349

Area
  - Total: 1.61 km^{2} (0.62 sq mi)
- Elevation: 302 m (991 ft)

Population (2026-01-01)
  - Total: 164
  - Density: 102/km^{2} (264/sq mi)
- Time zone: UTC+1 (CET)
  - Summer (DST): UTC+2 (CEST)
- Postal code: 666 03
- Website: www.obec-skalicka.cz

Skalička is a municipality and village in Brno-Country District in the South Moravian Region of the Czech Republic. It has about 200 inhabitants.

Skalička lies approximately 20 kilometres (12 mi) north of Brno and 171 km (106 mi) south-east of Prague.

== Demographics ==
Historical population
Year	Pop.	±%
1869	164	—
1880	186	+13.4%
1890	194	+4.3%
1900	187	−3.6%
1910	193	+3.2%
1921	193	+0.0%
1930	195	+1.0%
1950	162	−16.9%
1961	167	+3.1%
1970	140	−16.2%
1980	131	−6.4%
1991	93	−29.0%
2001	89	−4.3%
2011	130	+46.1%
2021	170	+30.8%
Source: Censuses
