= Struhařov (Benešov District) =

- Municipality
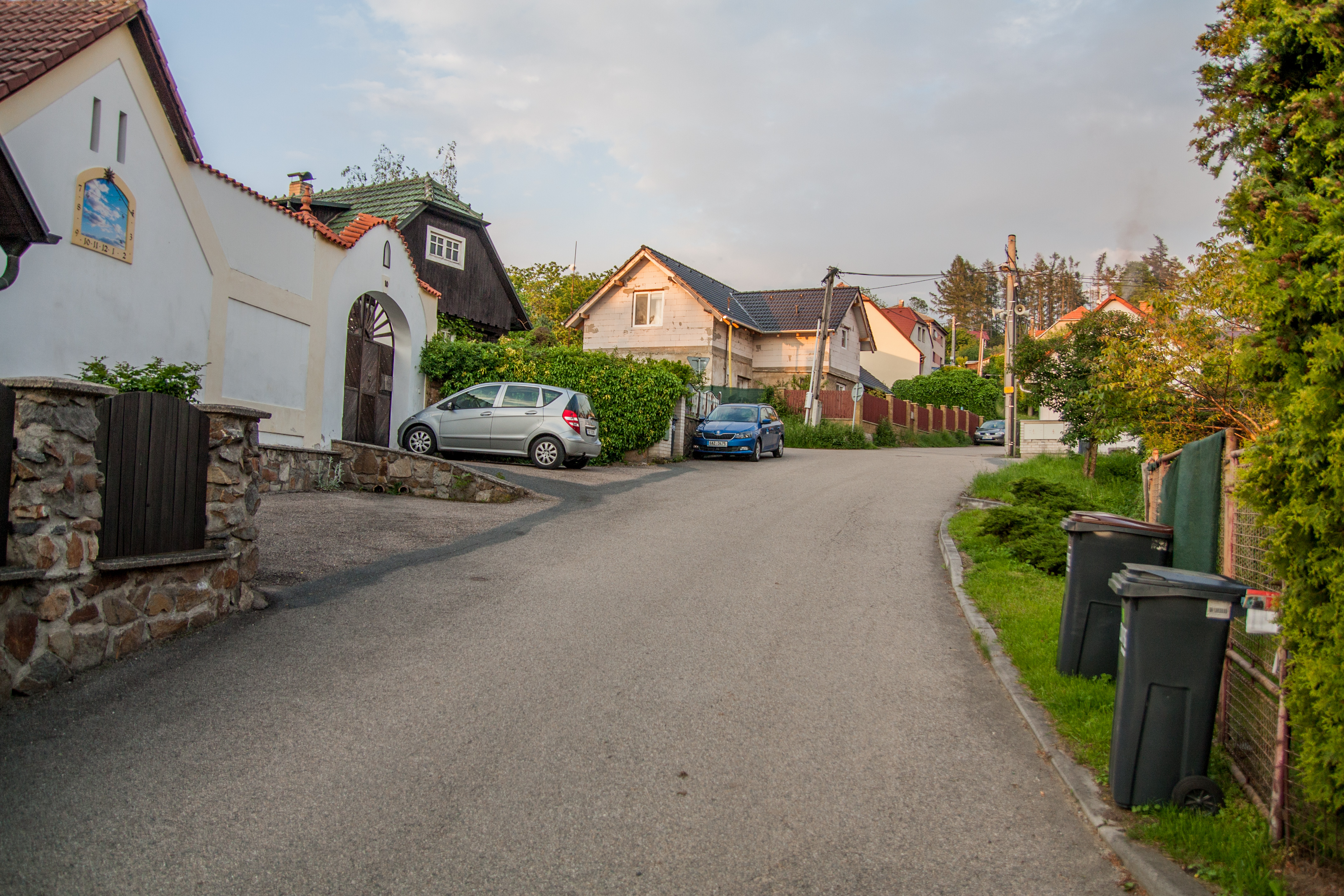
- A street in Struhařov

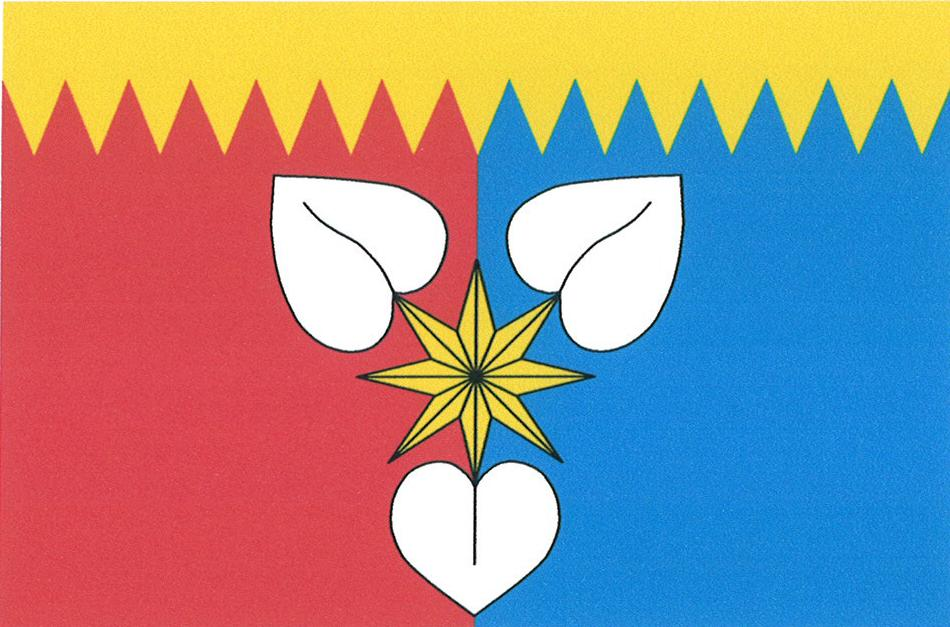
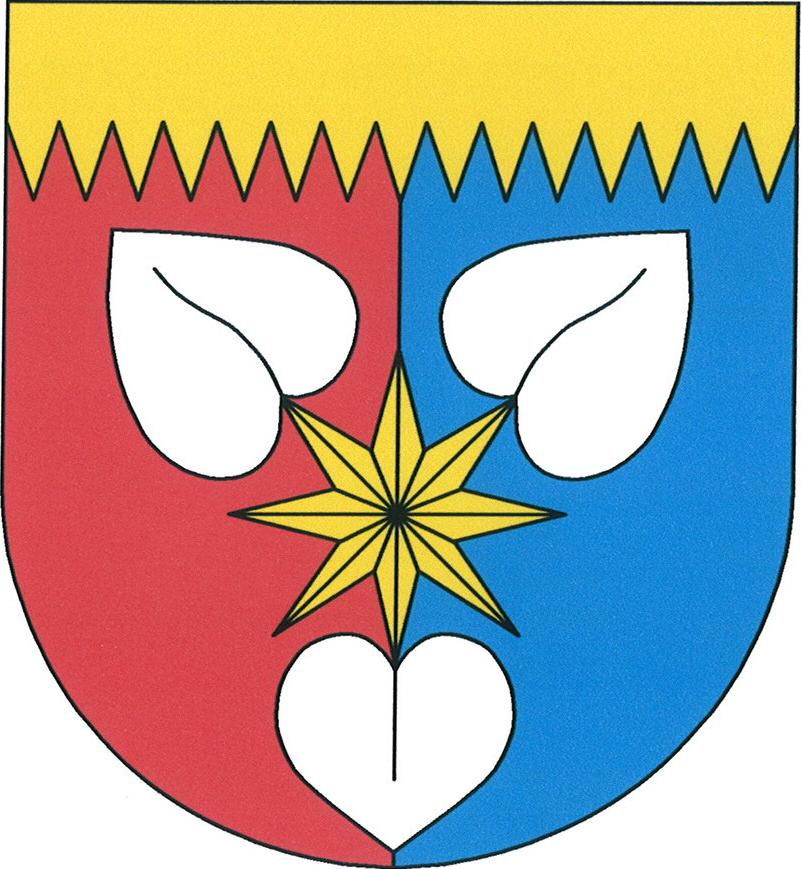
- Flag Coat of arms

- Location in the Czech Republic
- Coordinates: 49°45′56″N 14°45′44″E
- Country: Czech Republic
- Region: Central Bohemian
- District: Benešov
- First mentioned: 1370

Area
  - Total: 21.97 km^{2} (8.48 sq mi)
- Elevation: 448 m (1,470 ft)

Population (2026-01-01)
  - Total: 1,021
  - Density: 46.47/km^{2} (120.4/sq mi)
- Time zone: UTC+1 (CET)
  - Summer (DST): UTC+2 (CEST)
- Postal code: 256 01
- Website: obecstruharov.cz

Struhařov is a municipality and village in Benešov District in the Central Bohemian Region of the Czech Republic. It has about 1,000 inhabitants.

== Administrative division ==
Struhařov consists of 15 municipal parts (in brackets population according to the 2021 census):

- Struhařov (394)
- Babčice (5)
- Bořeňovice (103)
- Budkov (41)
- Býkovice (23)
- Dolní Podhájí (15)
- Hliňánky (11)
- Horní Podhájí (90)
- Jezero (54)
- Myslíč (95)
- Pecínov (13)
- Skalice (69)
- Střížkov (13)
- Svatý Jan (5)
- Věřice (22)

== Etymology ==
The name Struhařov is derived either from the personal name Strhař or Struhař (meaning "Strhař's/Struhař's (court)"), or from strhař, which is an old Czech word for a craftsman who makes boards.

== Geography ==
Struhařov is located about 5 kilometres (3 mi) east of Benešov and 36 km (22 mi) southeast of Prague. It lies in the Benešov Uplands. The highest point is the hill Hůrka at 519 m (1,703 ft) above sea level. The municipal territory is rich in small fishponds.

== History ==
The first written mention of Struhařov is from 1370. In 1650, Struhařov was owned by the Lords of Říčany and was a separate estate. They sold the estate to Count František Adam Trautmannsdorf in 1717. After his death in 1762, Struhařov often changed owners.

== Demographics ==
Historical population

Year	Pop.	±%
1869	1,739	—
1880	1,738	−0.1%
1890	1,666	−4.1%
1900	1,612	−3.2%
1910	1,498	−7.1%

Year	Pop.	±%
1921	1,495	−0.2%
1930	1,344	−10.1%
1950	1,055	−21.5%
1961	964	−8.6%
1970	842	−12.7%

Year	Pop.	±%
1980	754	−10.5%
1991	653	−13.4%
2001	630	−3.5%
2011	782	+24.1%
2021	953	+21.9%

Source: Censuses

== Transport ==
Struhařov is located on the railway line Benešov–Vlašim.

== Sights ==
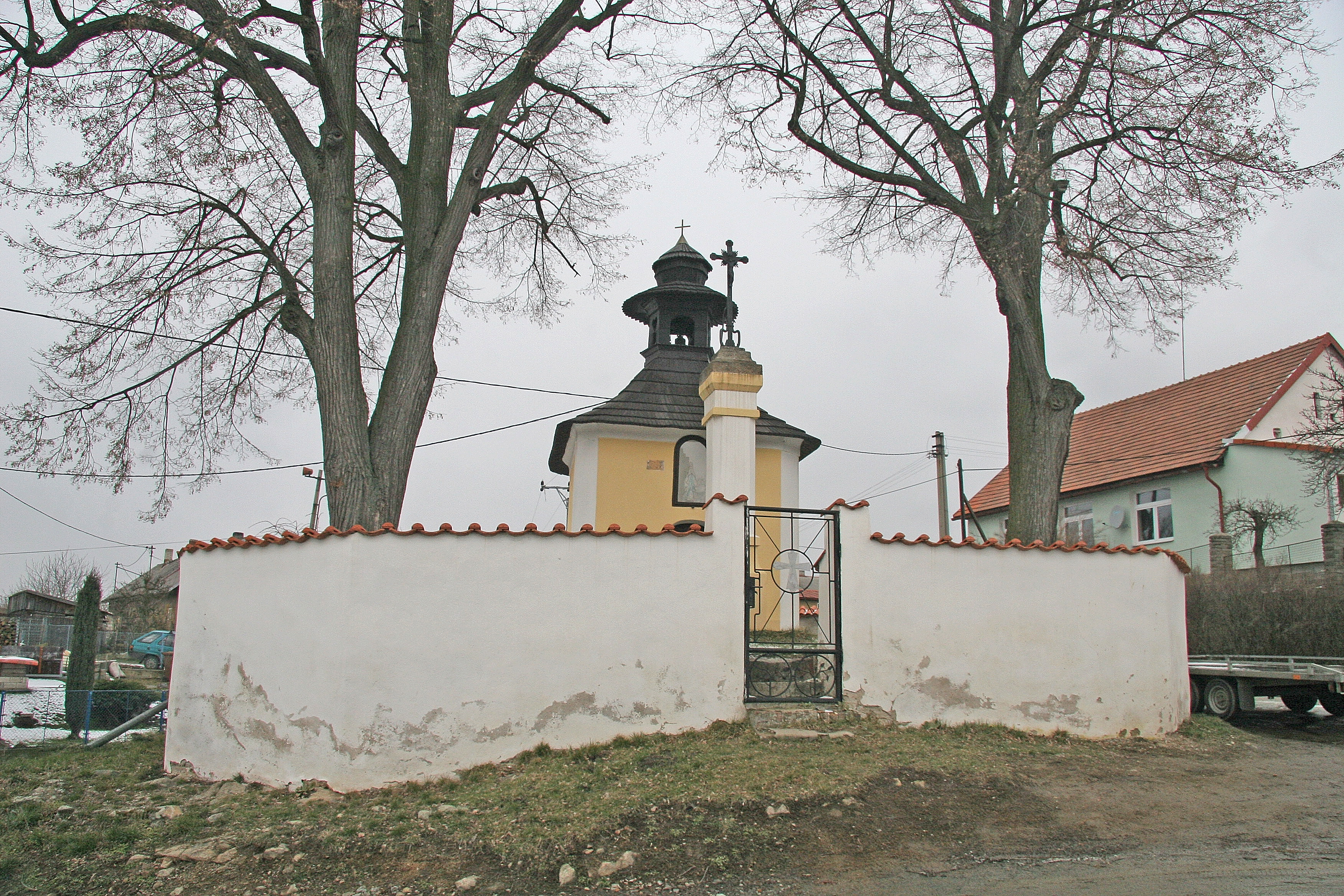
Chapel of the Virgin Mary

The main landmark of Struhařov is the Chapel of the Virgin Mary. It was built in the second half of the 18th century.

A cultural monument is the castle in Střížkov. It was probably built at the beginning of the 19th century. Today the building is unused.
