= Nečín =

- Municipality
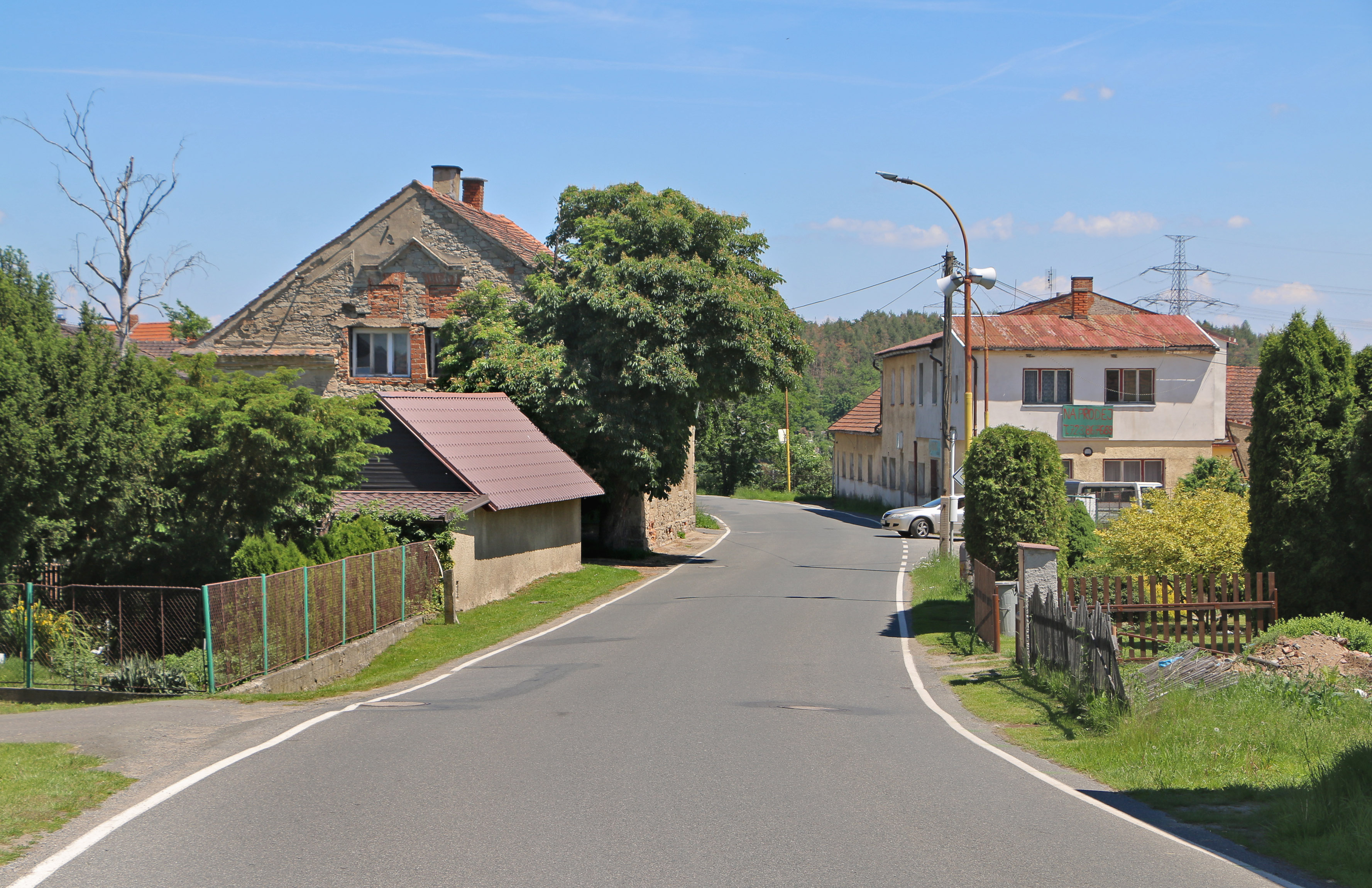
- Northeastern part of Nečín

- Location in the Czech Republic
- Coordinates: 49°41′55″N 14°14′3″E
- Country: Czech Republic
- Region: Central Bohemian
- District: Příbram
- First mentioned: 1570

Area
  - Total: 26.23 km^{2} (10.13 sq mi)
- Elevation: 410 m (1,350 ft)

Population (2026-01-01)
  - Total: 778
  - Density: 29.7/km^{2} (76.8/sq mi)
- Time zone: UTC+1 (CET)
  - Summer (DST): UTC+2 (CEST)
- Postal codes: 262 13, 263 01
- Website: www.necin.cz

Nečín is a municipality and village in Příbram District in the Central Bohemian Region of the Czech Republic. It has about 800 inhabitants.

== Administrative division ==
Nečín consists of eight municipal parts (in brackets population according to the 2021 census):

- Nečín (501)
- Bělohrad (8)
- Jablonce (4)
- Lipiny (45)
- Skalice (133)
- Strupina (0)
- Vaječník (8)
- Žebrák (48)

== Etymology ==
The initial name of the village was Nečíně, meaning "Nečíň's (meadow, slope)". The name was distorted to Nečín in the mid-17th century.

== Geography ==
Nečín is located about 16 kilometres (10 mi) east of Příbram and 39 km (24 mi) south of Prague. It lies in the Benešov Uplands. The highest point is the hill Nečínská besídka at 508 m (1,667 ft) above sea level. There are several small flooded granite quarries in the municipal territory.

== History ==
The first written mention of Nečín is from 1570. The village was founded in the mid-16th century.

== Demographics ==
Historical population

Year	Pop.	±%
1869	1,335	—
1880	1,233	−7.6%
1890	1,284	+4.1%
1900	1,259	−1.9%
1910	1,287	+2.2%

Year	Pop.	±%
1921	1,188	−7.7%
1930	1,163	−2.1%
1950	878	−24.5%
1961	852	−3.0%
1970	778	−8.7%

Year	Pop.	±%
1980	735	−5.5%
1991	691	−6.0%
2001	716	+3.6%
2011	746	+4.2%
2021	748	+0.3%

Source: Censuses

== Economy ==
There is a granite quarry in Nečín. The tradition of quarrying dates back to the 18th century.

== Transport ==
The I/18 road (the section from Příbram to Sedlčany) runs along the southern municipal border.

== Sights ==
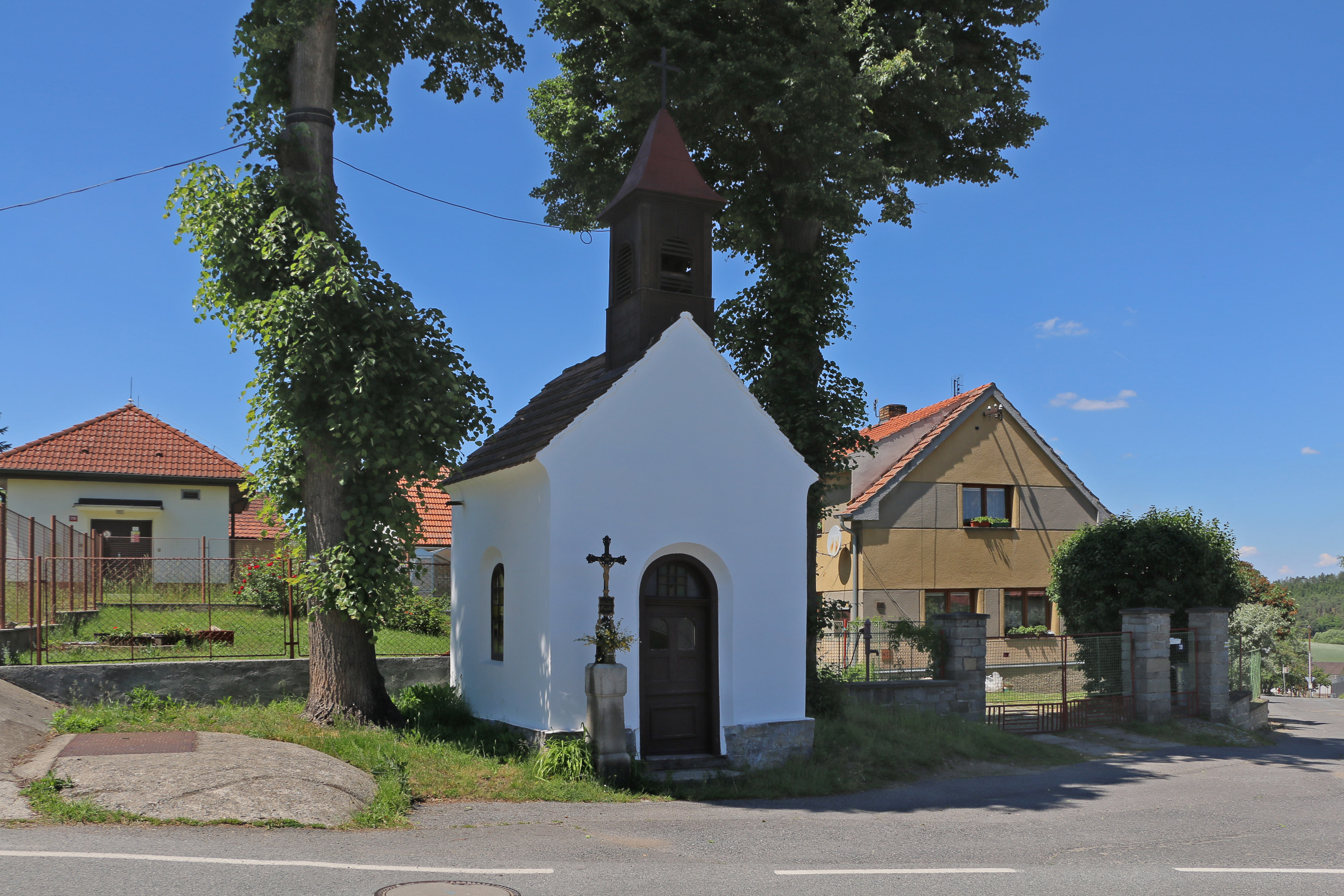
Chapel in Nečín

There are no protected cultural monuments in the municipality. A cultural landmark of Nečín is a small chapel.
