= Skalice (Hradec Králové District) =

- Municipality
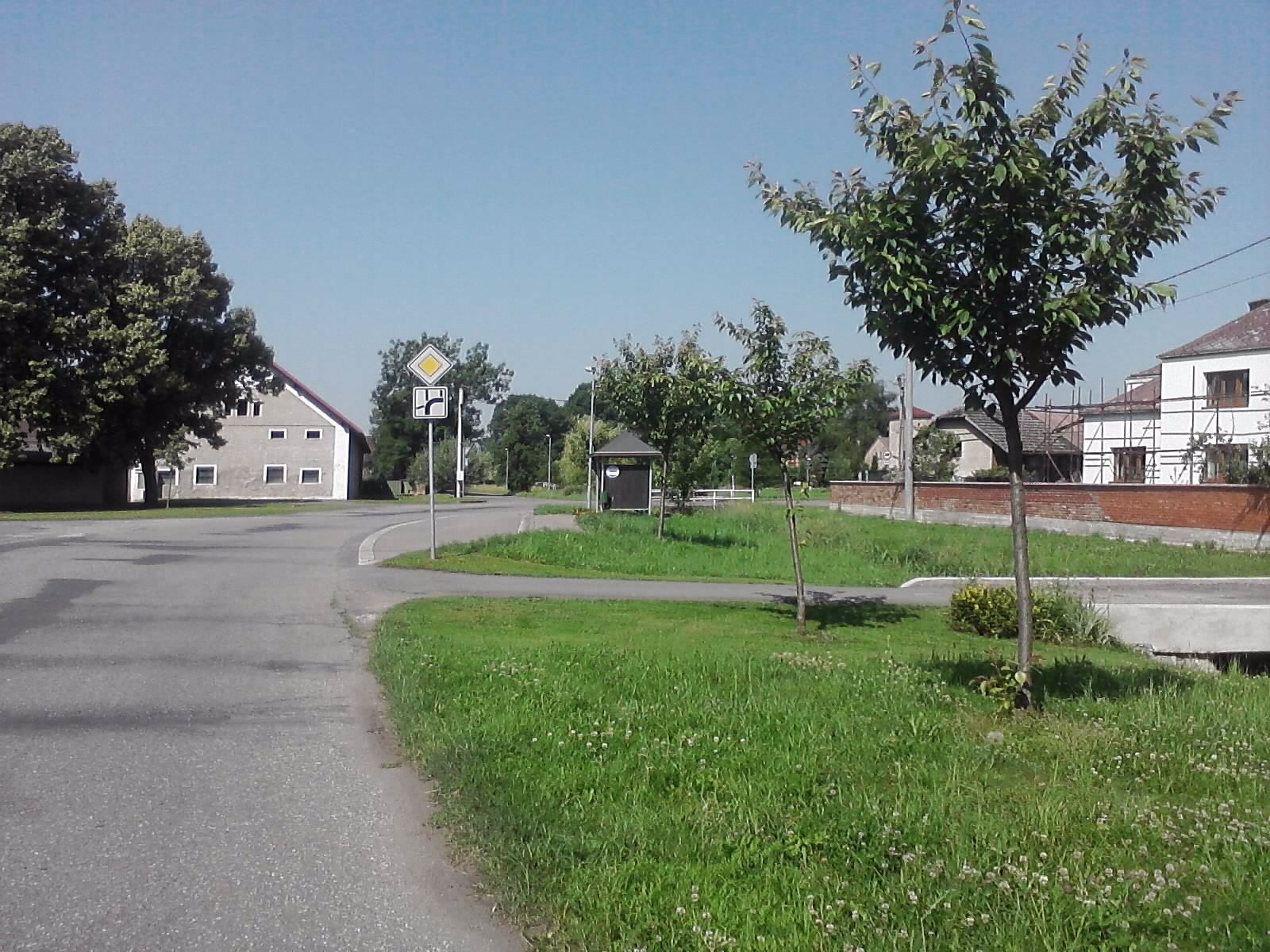
- Centre of Skalice

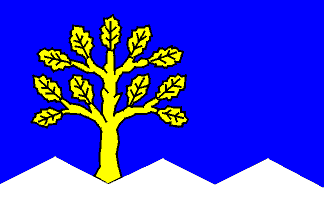
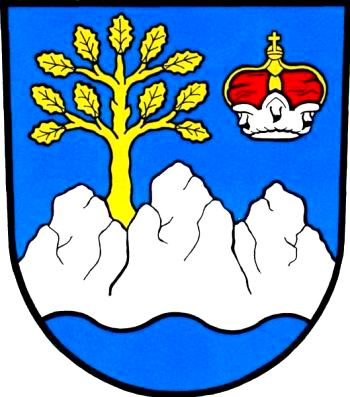
- Flag Coat of arms

- Location in the Czech Republic
- Coordinates: 50°16′35″N 15°52′20″E
- Country: Czech Republic
- Region: Hradec Králové
- District: Hradec Králové
- First mentioned: 1143

Area
  - Total: 8.30 km^{2} (3.20 sq mi)
- Elevation: 242 m (794 ft)

Population (2026-01-01)
  - Total: 668
  - Density: 80.5/km^{2} (208/sq mi)
- Time zone: UTC+1 (CET)
  - Summer (DST): UTC+2 (CEST)
- Postal codes: 500 03, 503 43
- Website: www.skalice.info

Skalice is a municipality and village in Hradec Králové District in the Hradec Králové Region of the Czech Republic. It has about 700 inhabitants.

== Administrative division ==
Skalice consists of three municipal parts (in brackets population according to the 2021 census):

- Skalice (296)
- Číbuz (128)
- Skalička (240)

== Etymology ==
The name Skalice is a diminutive of the Czech word skála, i.e. 'rock'. The name of the village of Skalička is a diminutive of Skalice.

== Geography ==
Skalice is located about 7 kilometres (4 mi) north of Hradec Králové. It lies in an agricultural landscape, mostly in the Orlice Table and to a lesser extent in the East Elbe Table. The highest point is at 264 m (866 ft) above sea level. The municipality is situated on the left bank of the Elbe River.

== History ==
The first written mention of Skalice is from 1143, when the village was donated to the Strahov Monastery. It was a small settlement, but in the 13th century it was enlarged by the influx of German immigrants, who then gradually became Czechs. In 1359, Skalice was documented as a property of the Lords of Dobruška. From 1380, it was part of the Smiřice estate.

== Demographics ==
Historical population

Year	Pop.	±%
1869	823	—
1880	884	+7.4%
1890	889	+0.6%
1900	922	+3.7%
1910	778	−15.6%

Year	Pop.	±%
1921	774	−0.5%
1930	790	+2.1%
1950	580	−26.6%
1961	569	−1.9%
1970	553	−2.8%

Year	Pop.	±%
1980	553	+0.0%
1991	516	−6.7%
2001	514	−0.4%
2011	583	+13.4%
2021	664	+13.9%

Source: Censuses

== Transport ==
There are no railways or major roads passing through the municipality.

== Sights ==
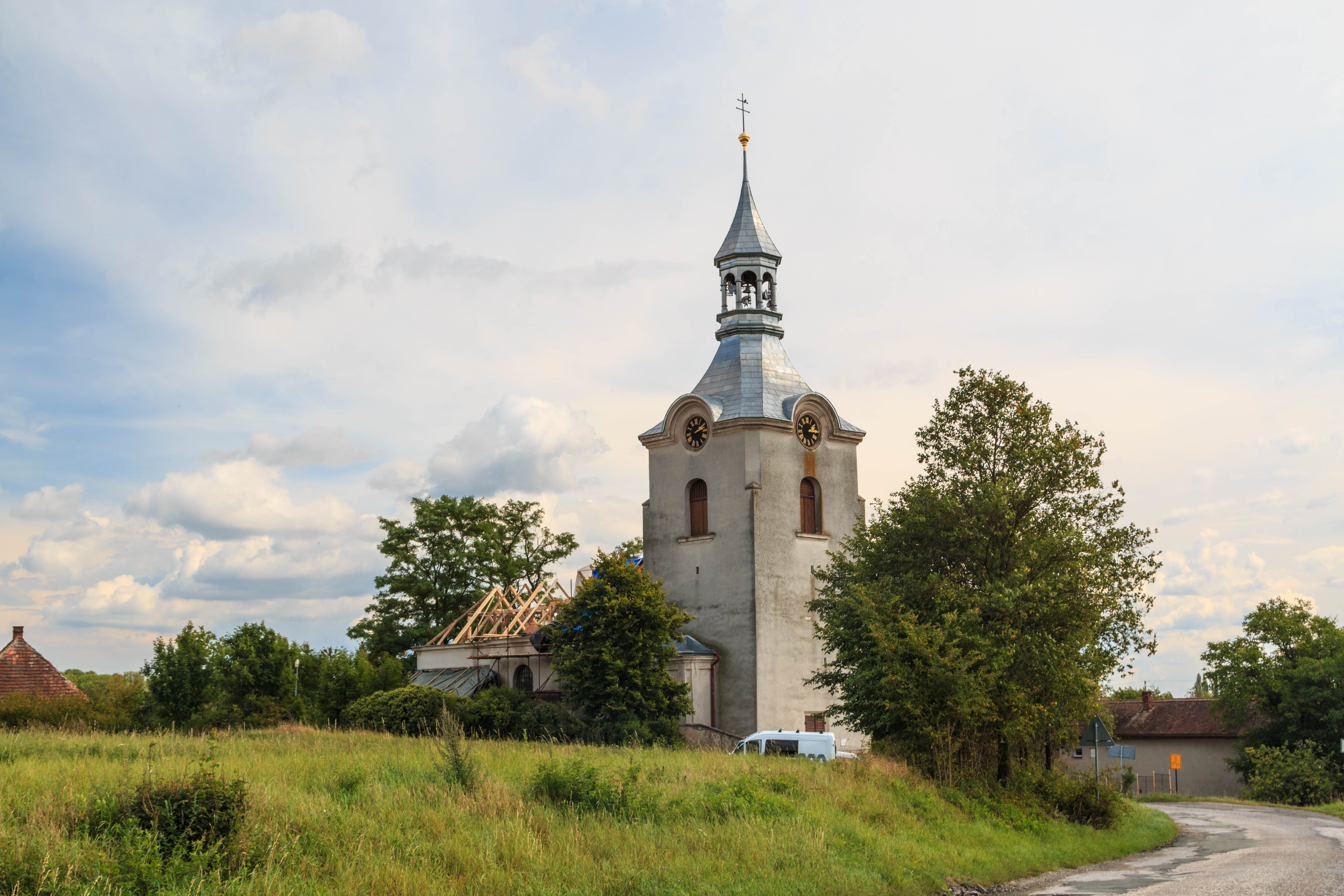
Church of Saint Wenceslaus

The most important monument is the Church of Saint Wenceslaus in Číbuz. It was built in the Renaissance style in 1601, on the site of an older church. Its present appearance is the result of late Baroque modifications.
