= Deoxyhypusine synthase =

Identifiers
- EC no.: 2.5.1.46
- CAS no.: 127069-31-2

Databases
- IntEnz: IntEnz view
- BRENDA: BRENDA entry
- ExPASy: NiceZyme view
- KEGG: KEGG entry
- MetaCyc: metabolic pathway
- PRIAM: profile
- PDB structures: RCSB PDB PDBe PDBsum
Search
- PMC: articles
- PubMed: articles
- NCBI: proteins

Deoxyhypusine synthase (EC 2.5.1.46, spermidine:eIF5A-lysine 4-aminobutyltransferase (propane-1,3-diamine-forming)) is an enzyme with systematic name (eIF5A-precursor)-lysine:spermidine 4-aminobutyltransferase (propane-1,3-diamine-forming). This enzyme catalyses the following chemical reaction

[eIF5A-precursor]-lysine + spermidine $\rightleftharpoons$ [eIF5A-precursor]-deoxyhypusine + propane-1,3-diamine (overall reaction)
(1a) spermidine + NAD^{+} $\rightleftharpoons$ dehydrospermidine + NADH
(1b) dehydrospermidine + [enzyme]-lysine $\rightleftharpoons$ N-(4-aminobutylidene)-[enzyme]-lysine + propane-1,3-diamine
(1c) N-(4-aminobutylidene)-[enzyme]-lysine + [eIF5A-precursor]-lysine $\rightleftharpoons$ N-(4-aminobutylidene)-[eIF5A-precursor]-lysine + [enzyme]-lysine
(1d) N-(4-aminobutylidene)-[eIF5A-precursor]-lysine + NADH + H+ $\rightleftharpoons$ [eIF5A-precursor]-deoxyhypusine + NAD^{+}

The eukaryotic initiation factor eIF5A contains a hypusine residue that is essential for activity.
