= Hydroxydanaidal =

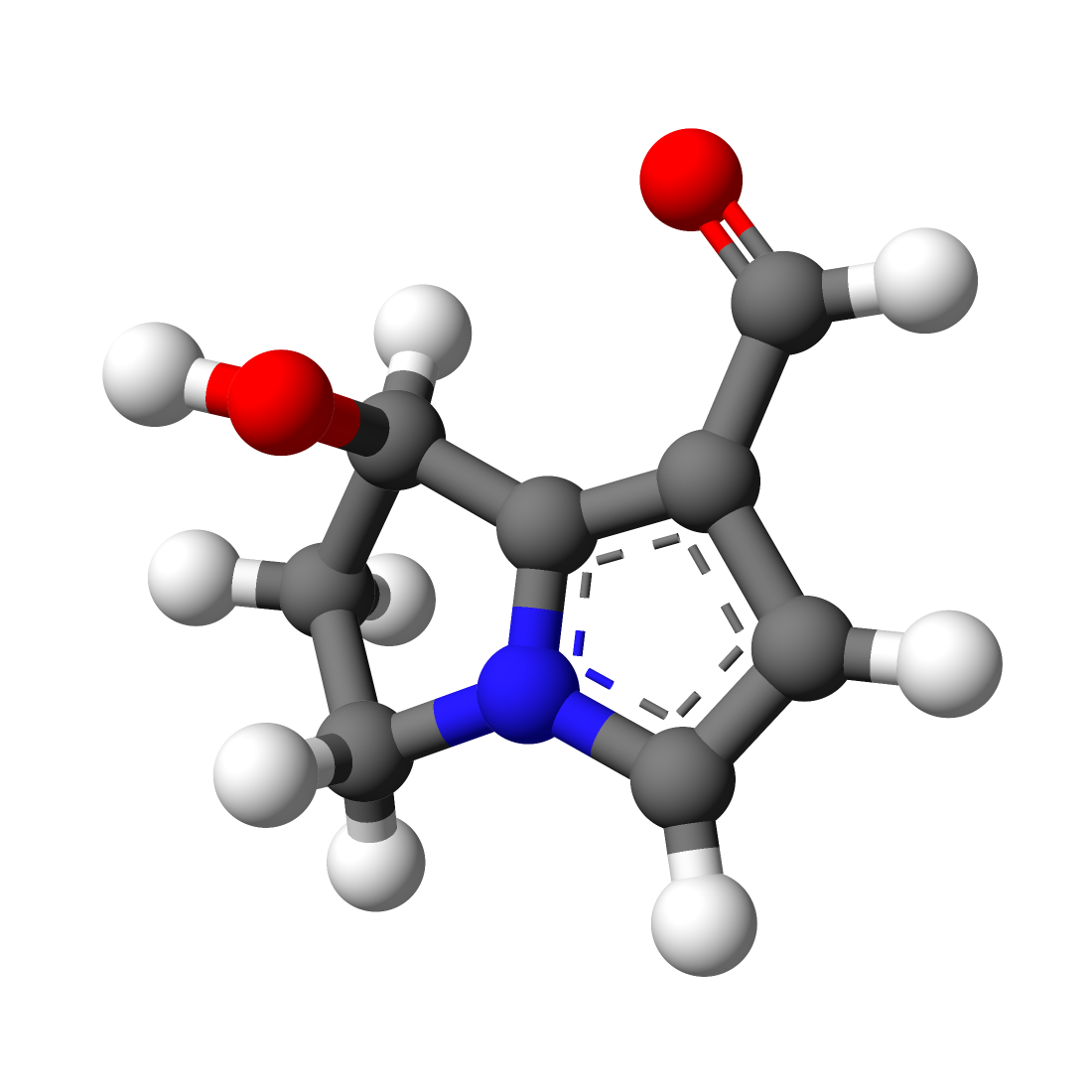

Names
- IUPAC name 7-Hydroxy-6,7-dihydro-5H-pyrrolizin-1-carboxaldehyde

Identifiers
CAS Number	34199-35-4
3D model (JSmol)	Interactive image
ChemSpider	142107
PubChem CID	161805
UNII	CCJ9N9N4QT
CompTox Dashboard (EPA)	DTXSID60955744
- InChI: InChI=1S/C8H9NO2/c10-5-6-1-3-9-4-2-7(11)8(6)9/h1,3,5,7,11H,2,4H2 Key: QJXKHTIRIREIAG-UHFFFAOYSA-N
- SMILES: O=Cc1ccn2CC[C@@H](O)c12

Properties
Chemical formula	C_{8}H_{9}NO_{2}
Molar mass	151.165 g·mol^{−1}
Appearance	Solid
Melting point	55 °C (131 °F; 328 K)
- Except where otherwise noted, data are given for materials in their standard state (at 25 °C [77 °F], 100 kPa). Infobox references

Hydroxydanaidal is an insect pheromone synthesized by some species of moth from pyrrolizidine alkaloids found in their diet.

== Use ==
The caterpillars of several kinds of arctiid moth ingest pyrrolizidine alkaloids—substances which plants produce to deter herbivores—and use them as protection against insectivores. The larva converts the alkaloid into an N-oxide for storage; on metamorphosis, the alkaloid is retained and used by the adult. This was discovered after the observation that Utetheisa ornatrix moths caught in spiderwebs were cut loose by the spiders.

Many insects that carry pyrrolizidine alkaloids are brightly-colored to signal their toxicity.

Male tiger moths convert the alkaloid through various intermediate stages into the pheromone hydroxydanaidal; female moth prefer males with more pheromone, since the alkaloid will be transferred into her eggs and protect them from predation.
