= NDUFV2 =

Protein-coding gene in the species Homo sapiens

Identifiers
- Aliases: NDUFV2, CI-24k, NADH:ubiquinone oxidoreductase core subunit V2, MC1DN7
- External IDs: OMIM: 600532; MGI: 1920150; GeneCards: NDUFV2
Enzyme activity
EC #	BRENDA	ExPASy	KEGG	MetaCyc
7.1.1.2	↗	↗	↗	↗

Gene location (Human)
Chr.	Chromosome 18 (human)
Band	18p11.22	Start	9,102,630 bp
Band	18p11.22	End	9,134,345 bp

Gene location (Mouse)
Chr.	Chromosome 17 (mouse)
Band	17 35.26 cM|17 E1.1	Start	66,385,633 bp
Band	17 35.26 cM|17 E1.1	End	66,408,554 bp
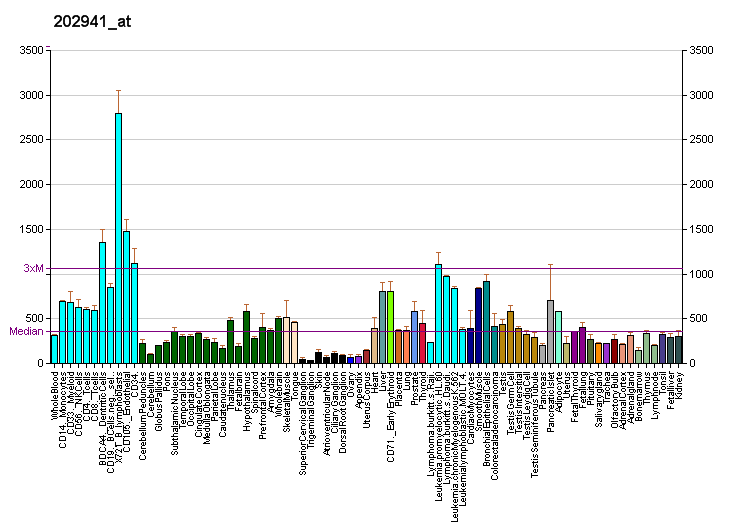
RNA expression pattern
Bgee	Human / Mouse (ortholog); Top expressed in: apex of heart; gastrocnemius muscle; muscle of thigh; right lobe of liver; left ventricle; right auricle of heart; right adrenal gland; olfactory zone of nasal mucosa; right adrenal cortex; left adrenal gland / Top expressed in: interventricular septum; myocardium of ventricle; extensor digitorum longus muscle; intercostal muscle; cardiac muscle tissue of left ventricle; digastric muscle; soleus muscle; plantaris muscle; sternocleidomastoid muscle; temporal muscle; More reference expression data
BioGPS	More reference expression data
Gene ontology
Molecular function	NADH dehydrogenase activity; electron transfer activity; NADH dehydrogenase (ubiquinone) activity; oxidoreductase activity; iron-sulfur cluster binding; metal ion binding; 2 iron, 2 sulfur cluster binding; protein binding
Cellular component	membrane; mitochondrial inner membrane; myelin sheath; mitochondrial respiratory chain complex I; respirasome; mitochondrion; plasma membrane respiratory chain complex I
Biological process	nervous system development; cardiac muscle tissue development; mitochondrial respiratory chain complex I assembly; mitochondrial electron transport, NADH to ubiquinone
Sources:Amigo / QuickGO
Orthologs
Databases	NCBI: entry; OMA: entry
Species	Human	Mouse
Entrez	4729	72900
Ensembl	ENSG00000178127	ENSMUSG00000024099
UniProt	P19404	Q9D6J6
RefSeq (mRNA)	NM_021074	NM_001278415; NM_028388
RefSeq (protein)	NP_066552	NP_001265344; NP_082664
Location (UCSC)	Chr 18: 9.1 – 9.13 Mb	Chr 17: 66.39 – 66.41 Mb
PubMed search
- Wikidata
View/Edit Human	View/Edit Mouse

NADH dehydrogenase [ubiquinone] flavoprotein 2, mitochondrial (NDUFV2) is an enzyme that in humans is encoded by the NDUFV2 gene. The encoded protein, NDUFV2, is a subunit of complex I of the mitochondrial respiratory chain, which is located on the inner mitochondrial membrane and involved in oxidative phosphorylation. Mutations in this gene are implicated in Parkinson's disease, bipolar disorder, schizophrenia, and have been found in one case of early onset hypertrophic cardiomyopathy and encephalopathy.

== Structure ==
NDUFV2 is located on the p arm of chromosome 18 in position 11.22 and has 9 exons. The NDUFV2 gene produces a 27.4 kDa protein composed of 249 amino acids. NDUFV2, the protein encoded by this gene, is a member of the complex I 24 kDa subunit family. It contains a cofactor binding site for a 2Fe-2S cluster and a transit peptide domain. The protein consists of 2 turns, 3 beta strands, and 7 alpha helixes. A non-transcribed pseudogene of this locus is found on chromosome 19.

== Function ==
The NADH-ubiquinone oxidoreductase complex (complex I) of the mitochondrial respiratory chain catalyzes the transfer of electrons from NADH to ubiquinone, and consists of at least 43 subunits. The complex is located in the inner mitochondrial membrane. This gene encodes the 24 kDa subunit of complex I, and is involved in electron transfer. NDUFV2 is an oxidoreductase and a component of the flavoprotein-sulfur (FP) fragment of the enzyme. It is thought to be required for assembly and catalysis.

=== Catalytic activity ===
NADH + ubiquinone + 5 H+(In) = NAD+ + ubiquinol + 4 H+(Out).

NADH + acceptor = NAD+ + reduced acceptor.

== Clinical significance ==
Mutations in the NDUFV2 gene are associated with Mitochondrial Complex I Deficiency, which is autosomal recessive. This deficiency is the most common enzymatic defect of the oxidative phosphorylation disorders. Mitochondrial complex I deficiency shows extreme genetic heterogeneity and can be caused by mutation in nuclear-encoded genes or in mitochondrial-encoded genes. There are no obvious genotype–phenotype correlations, and inference of the underlying basis from the clinical or biochemical presentation is difficult, if not impossible. However, the majority of cases are caused by mutations in nuclear-encoded genes. It causes a wide range of clinical disorders, ranging from lethal neonatal disease to adult-onset neurodegenerative disorders. Phenotypes include macrocephaly with progressive leukodystrophy, nonspecific encephalopathy, hypertrophic cardiomyopathy, myopathy, liver disease, Leigh syndrome, Leber hereditary optic neuropathy, and some forms of Parkinson disease.

== Interactions ==
NDUFV2 has been shown to have 102 binary protein-protein interactions including 80 co-complex interactions. NDUFV2 appears to interact with HSCB, CCNC, GOLM1, FAM114A2, CRMP1, KAT5, SP110.
