= Riddelliine =

Names
- IUPAC name (1R,4Z,7S,17R)-4-ethylidene-7-hydroxy-7-(hydroxymethyl)-6-methylidene-2,9-dioxa-14-azatricyclo[9.5.1.0^{14,17}]heptadec-11-ene-3,8-dione
- Other names Riddelline; Riddelliine; Riddeline; Riddelliin

Identifiers
CAS Number	23246-96-0
3D model (JSmol)	Interactive image
ChemSpider	17215841
PubChem CID	5281744
UNII	81YO8GX9J8
CompTox Dashboard (EPA)	DTXSID4026006
- InChI: InChI=1S/C18H23NO6/c1-3-12-8-11(2)18(23,10-20)17(22)24-9-13-4-6-19-7-5-14(15(13)19)25-16(12)21/h3-4,14-15,20,23H,2,5-10H2,1H3/b12-3-/t14-,15-,18-/m1/s1
- SMILES: [H][C@]1(C(COC([C@@]2(O)CO)=O)=CC3)N3CC[C@H]1OC(/C(CC2=C)=C\C)=O

Properties
Chemical formula	C_{18}H_{23}NO_{6}
Molar mass	349.383 g·mol^{−1}
- Except where otherwise noted, data are given for materials in their standard state (at 25 °C [77 °F], 100 kPa). Infobox references

Riddelliine is a chemical compound classified as a pyrrolizidine alkaloid. It was first isolated from Senecio riddellii and is also found in a variety of plants including Jacobaea vulgaris, Senecio vulgaris, and others plants in the genus Senecio.

Riddelliine can be found as a contaminant in foods such as meat, grains, seeds, milk, herbal tea, and honey.

Riddelliine is suspected to be a carcinogen. It is listed as an IARC Group 2B carcinogen and listed by the National Toxicology Program in its Report on Carcinogens which lists chemicals "known or reasonably anticipated to cause cancer in humans".

== Structure and reactivity ==
Riddelliine is a naturally occurring pyrrolizidine alkaloid, a class of compounds occurring in rangeland plants of the genera Crotalaria, Amsinckia, and Senecio. It consists of a macrocyclic diester of retronecine (an unsaturated alcohol) and riddelliic acid (an oxygenated, branched, dicarboxylic acid). Riddelliine is a colorless to off-white crystalline solid at room temperature and has a melting point of 197° to 198 °C. It is soluble in chloroform, acetone, and ethanol, and is sparingly soluble in water. As a solid, it is stable at room temperature in diffuse light for 12 months or longer. Alcoholic and aqueous solutions of riddelliine are stable at room temperature when protected from light. It emits toxic fumes of nitrogenoxide when heated to decomposition.

Chemical structure of retronecine

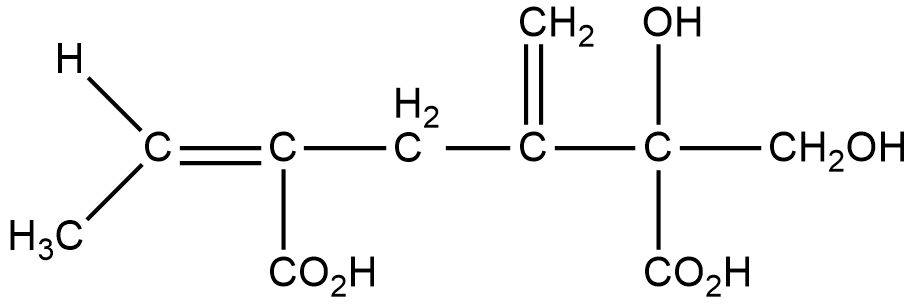
Chemical structure of riddelliic acid

== Synthesis ==
Riddelliine is produced naturally by a variety of plants in the genus Senecio. In particular, the Senecio riddelliispecies (commonly referred to as Riddell's ragwort) can attribute up to 18% of its total weight to riddelliine and its N-oxide counterpart, riddelliine N-oxide.

Like other pyrrolizidine alkaloids, the synthesis of riddelliine involves the conversion of ornithine and arginine into retronecine. A traced synthesis shows that arginine (or its precursor ornithine) is converted into putrescine, which then gets converted into homospermidine. Homospermidine is then oxidized into dialdehydeamine, which undergoes an intramolecular Mannich reaction to produce trachelanthamidine. Trachelanthamidine is converted into supinidine, the final intermediate to producing retronecine. Retronecine is then reacted with riddelliic acid to produce riddelliine.

A chemical synthesis of riddelliine has not yet been established.

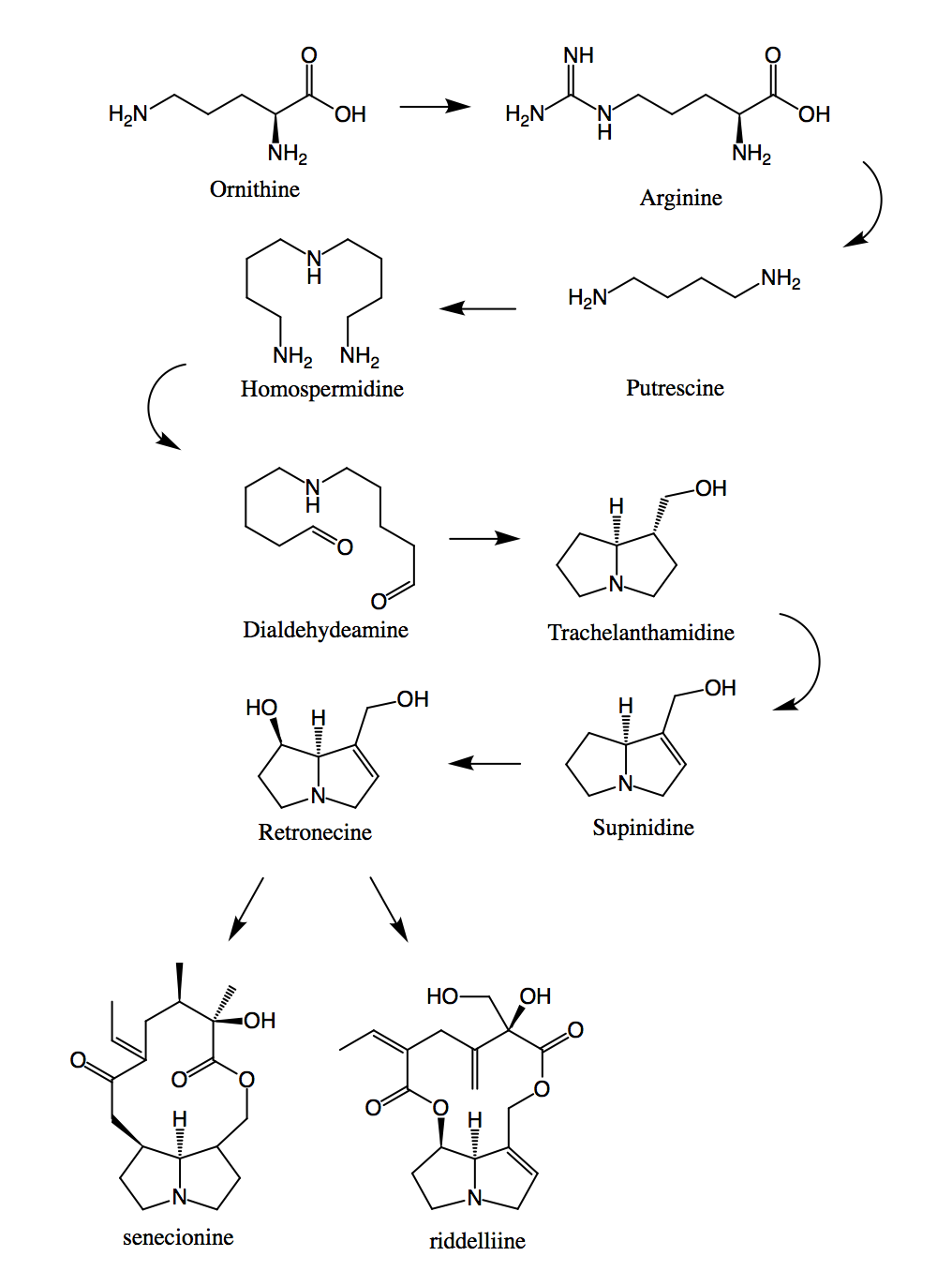
A proposed synthesis of a pyrrolizidine alkaloid (specifically, riddelliine) is shown.

== Mechanism ==
Riddelliine itself is not toxic; rather its metabolism in the liver contributes to its toxicity. Riddelliine can be hydrolyzed in the liver into riddelliine N-oxide, which like riddelliine is not a toxic substance. This pathway is considered a detoxicating reaction. On the other hand, riddelliine can be dehydrated by Cytochrome P450 to produce dehydroriddelliine. Two possible pathways emerge from this cytotoxic intermediate, both of which produce similar tumorigenic DNA adducts. Neither pathway has been proven to be the more predominate mechanism.

The first mechanism involves a movement of electrons intramolecularly to break the ester bond. This creates a carbocation that can bind to a DNA base covalently. By hydrolyzing the rest of the riddelliic acid from the original molecule, the resulting dehydropyrrolizine (DHP) can bind to another DNA base, which introduces a covalent cross-linking.

The second mechanism involves hydrolyzing the riddelliic acid to produce dehydropyrrolizine (DHP). By hydrolyzing both hydroxyl groups attached at carbons 3 and 8 of DHP, the resulting carbocation can bind to two DNA bases, producing another cross-linked DNA adduct.

In both cases, the covalently bonded DHP molecule can be further modified to induce stronger covalent bonding. To date, 8 DHP-derived DNA adducts have been observed, all of which contribute to the tumorigenicity of riddelliine.

== Toxicity ==
Riddelliine is isolated from plants grown in the western United States and is a prototype of genotoxic pyrrolizidine alkaloids (PAs). Human exposure to PAs occurs through consumption of herbal dietary supplements, including comfrey, and through contaminated livestock products (e.g., milk). PAs are probably the most common plant constituents that poison livestock, wildlife, and humans worldwide.

Riddelliine has been shown to have clear evidence of carcinogenic activity in male and female rats but there are no human studies done on the effects of riddelliine on humans. There have been cases of human poisoning due to PA intake. These cases consists of the following incidents:

- Heliotrope poisoning is endemic in central Asia, where seeds of Heliotropium species enter the wheat crop. The typical clinical picture is that of ascites, hepatosplenomegaly, veno-occlusive disease of the liver, and abnormal liver function.
- In South Africa, a disease known as "bread poisoning," found among poor Europeans, was traced to the inclusion of Senecio and Crotalaria seeds and flowers in whole grain processed for bread flour.
- A veno-occlusive disease outbreak in Jamaica was traced to the widespread use of "bush tea," an herbal medicine used to treat children for colds. In the Southwest of the United States, the popular herbal tea, gordolobo yerba, is a potential hazard for exposure to toxic PAs.

== Indications ==
In rats gavaged with riddelliine, a set of DNA adducts of dehydroretronecine (DHS) in liver DNA can serve as biomarkers for the tumorigenicity induced by riddelliine and related pyrrolizidine alkaloids.

== Adverse effects ==
=== Diseases ===
In humans, acute hepatic veno-occlusive disease was observed after the consumption of a herbal preparation containing riddelliine.

=== Genotoxicity ===
In an in-vitro system, exposure to riddelliine caused sister chromatid exchange in human lymphocytes, DNA-protein cross linking in bovine kidney epithelial cells and gene mutations in bacteria.

=== Carcinogenicity ===
There are no data on the carcinogenicity of riddelliine to humans, but based on experimental animal studies, riddelliine is classified as a Group 2B compound, which means that it is possibly carcinogenic to humans.

== Effects on animals ==
Riddelliine is toxic to animals, with ingestion being the most common method of exposure. In particular, riddelliine has a carcinogenic effect on rats and mice. In rats, oral administration of riddelliine led to an increase in hemangiosarcomas in the liver, cellular carcinomas and/or adenomas in the liver and mononuclear cell leukemia. In mice, oral administration of riddelliine led to hemangiosarcomas in the liver in males and to broncho-alveolar adenomas and carcinomas in females. Furthermore, during a 5 and 30 day study, where the rats and mice were force-fed riddelliine, there was unscheduled DNA synthesis in the cultured hepatocytes in male as well as female rats and mice.

Riddelliine has also been known to disturb the estrus cycle in rodents.

Riddelliine has also been observed to increase mutations in endothelial cells in the liver of rats. One study observed the characteristic nucleobases transversion of G:C to T:A, in which T:A amounts were elevated from 9% in the control group to 17% in the riddelliine-treated rats. In contrast, G:C→A:T transition, the major mutation in control rats that made up 54% of all mutations, was reduced to 40% of mutations in riddelliine-treated rats within the same study. These results suggest that the relatively high mutagenicity of riddelliine in rat liver endothelial cells may be partially responsible for the tumorigenic specificity of this agent.

Toxicity has also been observed in bacteria, particular the Salmonella bacteria S. Typhimurium. When exposed to Riddelliine, the bacterial cell contains many mutations within the genetic strains.

Clinical signs in poisoned animals include neurological, gastrointestinal (diarrhea), and hematologic (high blood ammonia, hemolysis) effects. Ascites is often observed. Molyneux et al. (1991) reported that calves fed Senecio riddellii, which contains only riddelliine and its N-oxide, for 20 days showed weight loss, signs of depression, reduced feed intake, ataxia of hind limbs, ascites, and edema before death.

Microscopic examination revealed hepatocellular necrosis and collapse of lobules, increased numbers of fibroblasts and collagen, portal edema, anisokaryosis of hepatocyte nuclei with some cytomegaly, and bile duct proliferation.

== History ==
The first reported isolation of 'Riddelliine' was done by Richard H. F. Manske, a chemist at the National Research Laboratories in Ottawa, Ontario, Canada. This was handed in on 13 December 1938 and published in the 17th volume, section B in the Canadian Journal of Research, January 1939.

The formula was confirmed and a structure was added by Roger Adams, K.E. Hamlin, JR., C.F. Jelinek and R.F. Phillips in the Journal of the American Chemical Society 1942.

== See also ==
- Pyrrolizidine alkaloid, the large class of molecules containing riddelliine
- Senecionine, a closely related pyrrolizidine alkaloid
