= Senecionine =

Names
- Preferred IUPAC name (3Z,5R,6R,9a^{1}R,14aR)-3-Ethylidene-3,4,5,6,9,9a^{1},11,13,14,14a-decahydro[1,6]dioxacyclododecino[2,3,4-gh]pyrrolizine-2,7-dione
- Other names Aureine

Identifiers
CAS Number	130-01-8
3D model (JSmol)	Interactive image
Beilstein Reference	94450
ChEBI	CHEBI:9107
ChEMBL	ChEMBL362153
ChemSpider	10254883
ECHA InfoCard	100.125.118
EC Number	603-379-6
KEGG	C06176
PubChem CID	5280906
UNII	BO6N1U5YG6
CompTox Dashboard (EPA)	DTXSID40871615
- InChI: InChI=1S/C18H25NO5/c1-4-12-9-11(2)18(3,22)17(21)23-10-13-5-7-19-8-6-14(15(13)19)24-16(12)20/h4-5,11,14-15,22H,6-10H2,1-3H3/b12-4-/t11-,14-,15-,18-/m1/s1 Key: HKODIGSRFALUTA-JTLQZVBZSA-N
- SMILES: O=C1O[C@@H]3CCN2C\C=C(\COC(=O)[C@](C)(O)[C@H](C)CC1=[C@H]C)[C@@H]23

Properties
Chemical formula	C_{18}H_{25}NO_{5}
Molar mass	335.400 g·mol^{−1}
Density	1.25 g/cm^{3}
- Except where otherwise noted, data are given for materials in their standard state (at 25 °C [77 °F], 100 kPa). verify (what is ?) Infobox references

Senecionine is a toxic pyrrolizidine alkaloid isolated from various botanical sources. It takes its name from the Senecio genus and is produced by many different plants in that genus, including Jacobaea vulgaris (Senecio jacobaea). It has also been isolated from several other plants, including Brachyglottis repanda, Emilia, Erechtites hieraciifolius, Petasites, Syneilesis, Crotalaria, Caltha leptosepala, and Castilleja.

The compound is toxic and consumption can lead to liver damage, cancer, and pyrrolizidine alkaloidosis. Because of this, consumption of plants that produce it has resulted in poisonings, both in humans and in animals.

== Toxicity ==
Like other pyrrolizidine alkaloids, senecionine is toxic when ingested. The ingested molecule is a protoxin that is metabolized to its active form.

In large quantities, ingestion can lead to critical illness, including convulsions and death. Studies in rodents have shown an LD_{50} of 65 mg/kg. In smaller, non-lethal quantities, ingestion can lead to intoxication, although clinical signs and symptoms may not present until months after exposure depending on the level of exposure.

Ingestion can lead to both liver and DNA damage.

=== Liver toxicity ===
The liver damage in both acute and chronic intoxication can cause hepatic veno-occlusive disease (VOS), signs and symptoms of which include nausea, vomiting, hepatomegaly, and bloody diarrhea. Additionally, acute intoxication can cause hemorrhagic necrosis and liver failure, with signs and symptoms including weight loss, jaundice, depression, behavior changes, and ascites. Photosensitive dermatitis may also be seen. Other symptoms and manifestations of chronic exposure include weakness, portal hypertension, and cirrhosis.

=== DNA damage ===
Senecionine ingestion can also induce DNA damage. Although there are few if any cases of human cancers directly linked to senecionine intoxication, rodent studies have shown that it is capable of inducing tumor formation in the liver, lung, skin, brain, spinal cord, pancreas, and gastrointestinal tract.

=== Diagnosis ===
Diagnosis of senecionine toxicity is made based on history, physical examination, and liver biopsy. Lab findings may include increased bile acid concentrations, hyperbilirubinemia, hypoproteinemia, and abnormal liver function tests (LFTs). However, it has been observed that chronically exposed animals may have normal lab values for months to years despite ongoing liver damage. Histological abnormalities on biopsy include megalocytosis, necrosis, fibrosis, and biliary hyperplasia, similar to other hepatotoxic ingestions and immune system disorders.

=== Other bioactivity ===
Senecionine has also been evaluated as an anti-microbial. A cocktail of pyrrolizidine alkaloids with senecionine in it has been shown to be toxic to Fusarium fungi at millimolar concentrations.

== Treatment ==
There are currently no known available drugs or antidotes to treat senecionine poisoning. Treatment is supportive to permit liver regeneration, which may include administration of intravenous (IV) fluids to correct dehydration and electrolyte imbalances, IV glucose, and wound care with antibiotics if dermatitis is a presenting symptom. Additionally, albumin infusions may be used to reduce ascites. Prevention remains the best method to reduce senecionine poisonings, including avoiding consumption of senecionine-containing plants and pesticide use to kill infestations of those plants.

== Biosynthesis and chemistry ==
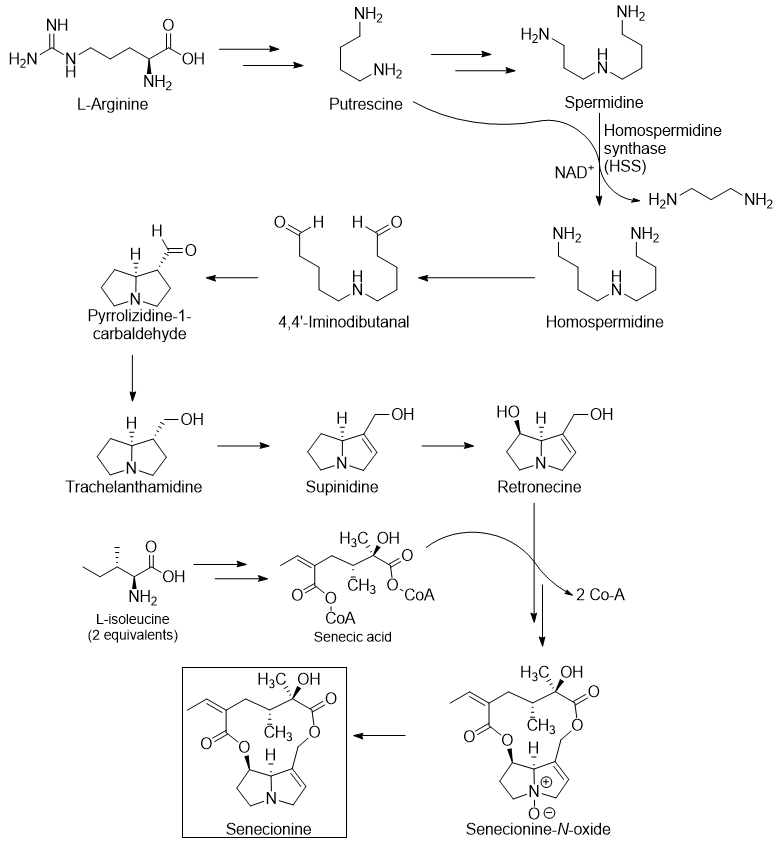
Biosynthesis of senecionine

In Senecio species, biosynthesis of senecionine starts from L-arginine or L-ornithine. Because plants don't have decarboxylase enzyme for L-ornithine, it must be first converted into L-arginine. Arginine can then be readily converted to putrescine and spermidine. Next, in an NAD+-dependent reaction catalyzed by homospermidine synthase (HSS), an aminopropyl group from putrescine is transferred to spermidine to form homospermidine, releasing 1,3-diaminopropane (see biosynthesis scheme). HSS is the only enzyme that has been definitively implicated in this biosynthesis.

Homospermidine is then oxidized and subsequently cyclized to form the stereospecific pyrrolizidine backbone. The aldehyde is then reduced and then the pyrrolizidine core is desaturated and hydroxylated through yet undetermined mechanisms to form retronecine. Retronecine is acylated by senecic acid, formed from two equivalents of L-isoleucine. This step forms the N-oxide of senecionine, which is subsequently reduced to yield senecionine.

Senecionine has a core structure of retronecine, an unsaturated pyrrolizide, with a 12-membered lactone ring attached to the core. The nitrogen atom in the pyrrolizidine core is weakly basic with an estimated pKa of 5.9.

== Metabolism and mechanism of action ==
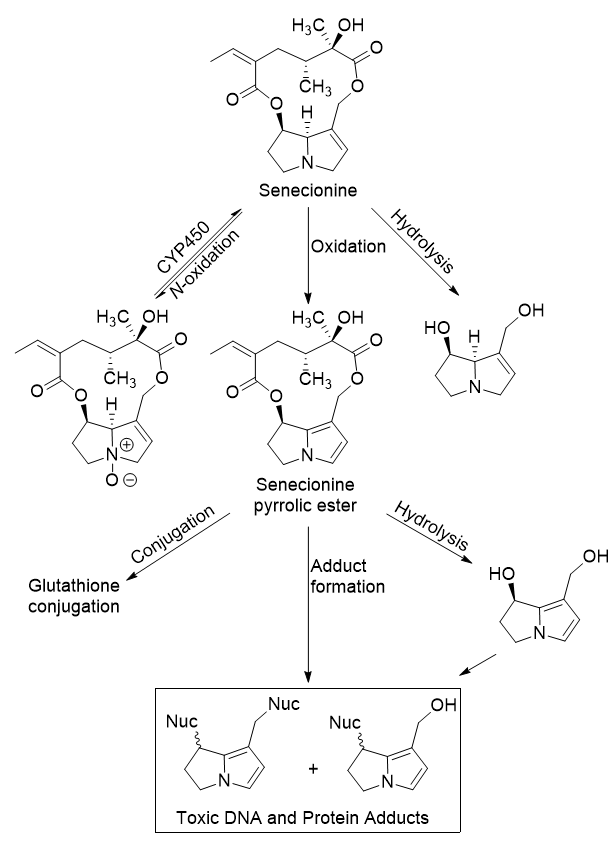
Metabolism and mechanism of action of pyrrolizidine alkaloid toxicity. Nuc=nucleophilic protein residue or DNA base

After oral ingestion, senecionine is absorbed from the gastrointestinal tract. When it reaches the liver, it is metabolized via three pathways: N-oxidation, oxidation, and ester hydrolysis. N-oxidation and hydrolysis are detoxification pathways, and the products of these reactions are conjugated and excreted by the kidneys. However, the N-oxide may be converted back into senecionine by cytochrome P-450 (CYP450) monooxygenases. Oxidation of senecionine to its respective dehydropyrrolizidine is responsible for its toxic effects.

In the toxic pathway, the 2-pyrroline in the core is desaturated via an oxidation reaction to form a pyrrolic ester. This metabolite can still subsequently be eliminated if it is conjugated to glutathione. However, this metabolite is toxic because it can act as an electrophile. It may be attacked by either DNA base pairs or by amino acid residues in liver proteins, resulting in the formation of toxic adducts, including cross-linked adducts between DNA base pairs, liver proteins, or both. These adducts can damage DNA, leading to genotoxicity and carcinogenesis, and liver enzymes and hepatocytes, leading to hepatotoxicity.

== Biology and society ==
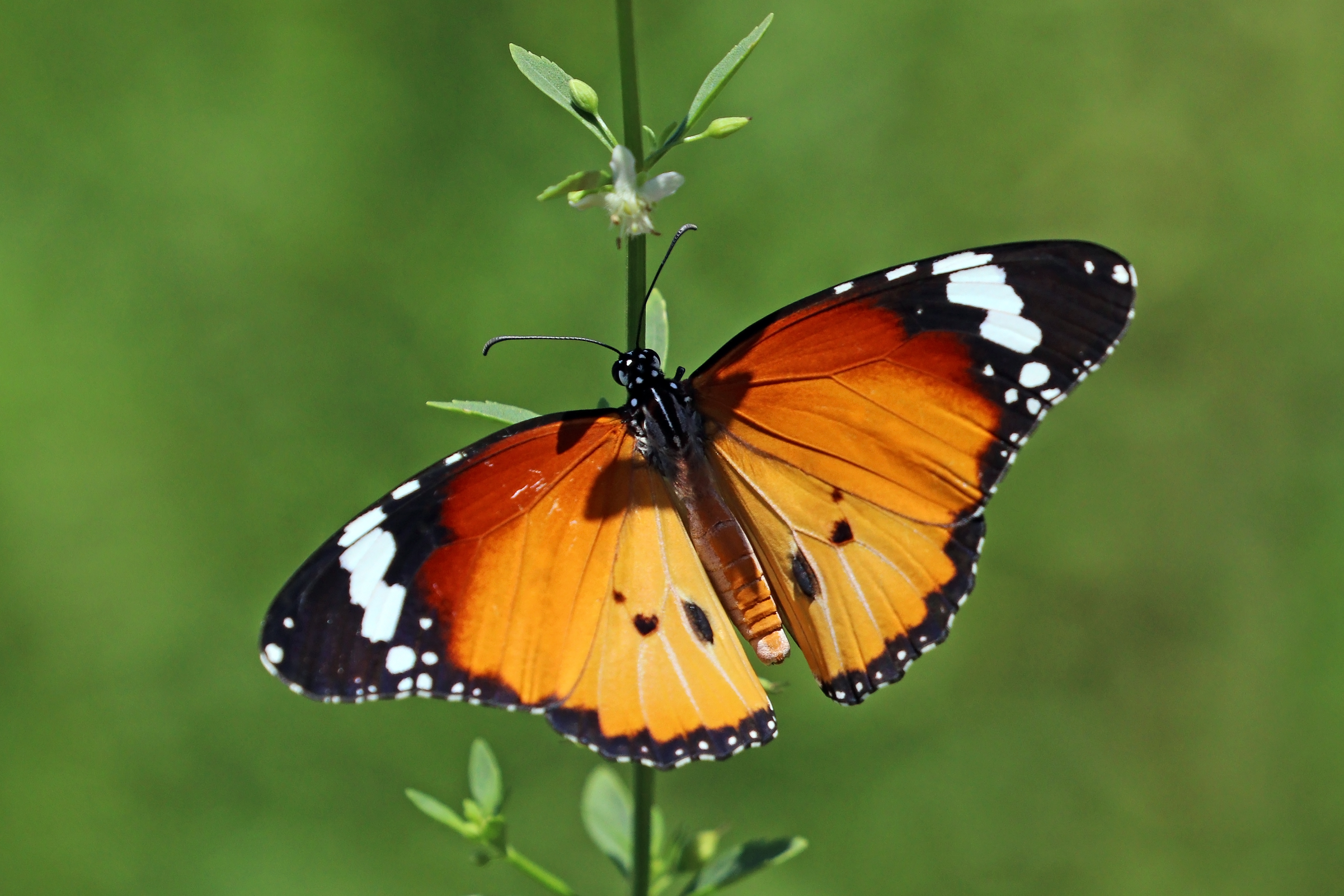
Danaus chrysippus butterflies consume senecionine to repel predators through a defense mechanism and to make pheromones

The Senecio plants groundsel and ragwort are both common and are found in many regions, most commonly as weeds on cultivated ground. Common ragwort is especially prevalent in Europe and has been responsible for livestock poisoning and deaths when it is consumed. In Africa, Australia, and the United States, Crotalaria species, shrub-like herbs, have been found to be responsible for similar livestock deaths. Horses seem to be particularly vulnerable to senecionine poisoning through ingestion of ragwort. Symptoms of poisoning in horses (known as "horse staggers") include nervousness, yawning, fatigue, and unsteady gait.

Some species have evolved to leverage senecionine for their own benefit. Danaus chrysippus butterflies can safely consume senecionine-containing plants, making them taste very bitter and thus unpalatable to predators. This adaptation is also present in grasshoppers of the genus Zonocerus and the caterpillars of the Cinnabar moth. Additionally, D. chrysippus are able to convert senecionine to pheromones necessary for successful mating. Consequently, experiments have shown that males deprived of pyrrolizidine alkaloids, including senecionine, in their diets are less successful at mating.

Senecionine-containing herbs have been used in folk medicine for the treatment of diabetes mellitus, hemorrhage, hypertension, and as a uterine stimulant, despite no documented evidence that it is effective for any of those conditions and overwhelming evidence of its toxicity.

In humans, bread contaminated with ragwort has caused senecionine poisonings (a condition colloquially known as "bread poisoning" in South Africa). In the West Indies, poisonings have been reported from the consumption of herbal teas made with Crotalaria.

== See also ==
- Riddelliine, a closely related pyrrolizidine alkaloid
