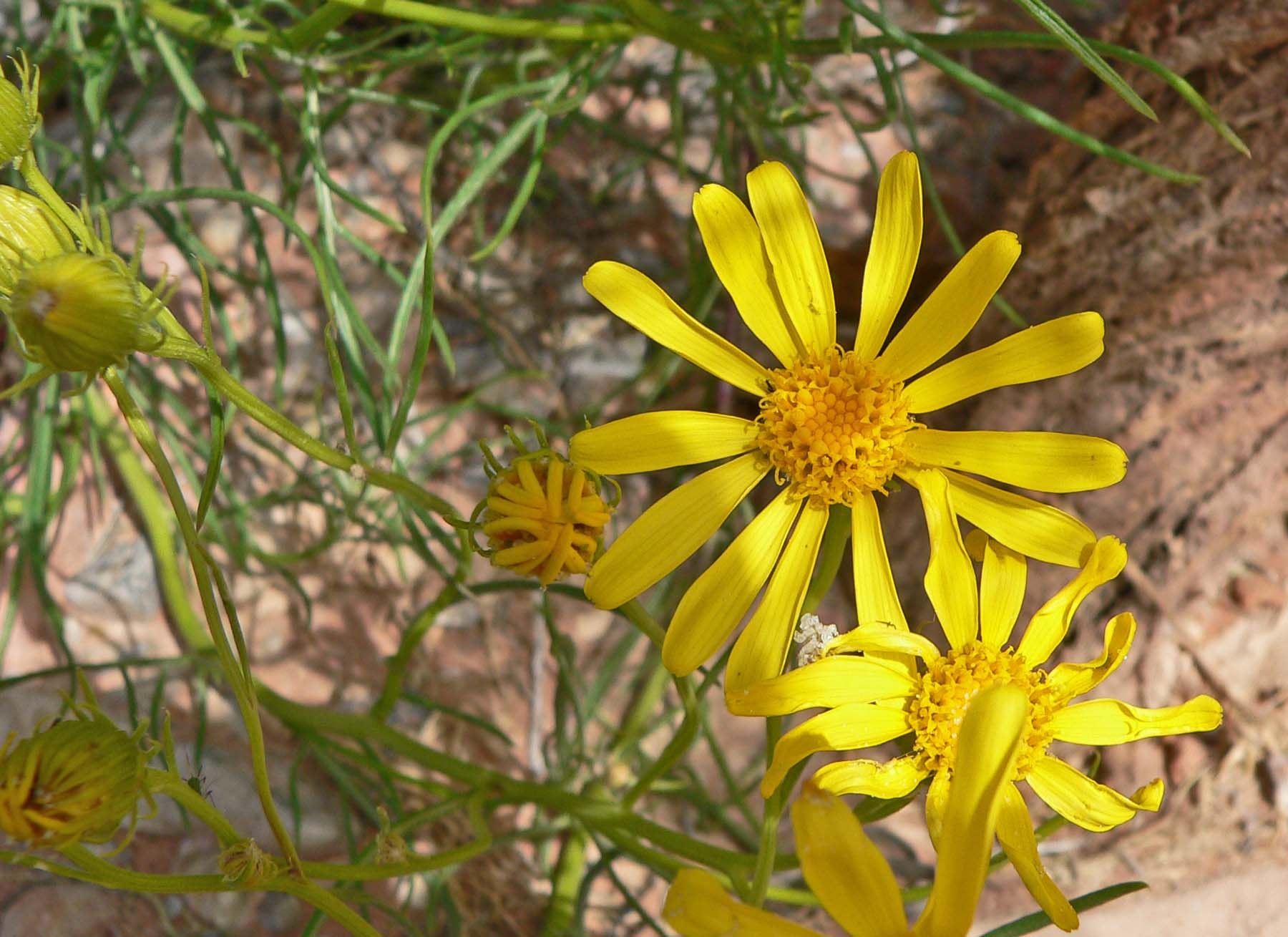

Conservation status
- Secure (NatureServe)

Scientific classification
- Kingdom: Plantae
- Clade: Embryophytes
- Clade: Tracheophytes
- Clade: Spermatophytes
- Clade: Angiosperms
- Clade: Eudicots
- Clade: Asterids
- Order: Asterales
- Family: Asteraceae
- Genus: Senecio
- Species: S. flaccidus

Binomial name
- Senecio flaccidus Less.
- Range of S. flaccidus

Synonyms
- Senecio longilobus Benth; Senecio filifolius (L.) Hook. Senecio douglasii DC. Senecio monoensis Greene

= Senecio flaccidus =

Species of flowering plant in the daisy family

Senecio flaccidus, also known as threadleaf ragwort, is a member of the daisy family. It is native from central to southwest North America, where it is common in gravelly and dry areas.

== Description ==
Threadleaf ragwort is a fast-growing, short-lived (3 to 6 years) bushy perennial shrub growing to 4 feet 6 inches (1.37 m) tall. It is covered by a white close wool. The stems are grooved and the branches are thin, herbaceous above and woody near the base.

The leaves are 1 to 5 inches (2.5 to 12.7 cm) long. They are alternate and deeply pinnate, divided into five to nine narrow lobes. These are gray-green above and tomentose.

From April to September appear showy yellow flowering heads, 3–4 inches (7.6–10.2 cm) across. They have eight to thirteen sterile ray flowers, and purplish brown disk florets that produce the seeds.

Seeds
Dicotyledon fruits; each a 1/8 inch (3.2 mm)-long achene that is ribbed and hoary, covered with short white hairs.

== Taxonomy and names ==
The species was formerly recorded as Senecio douglasii (in honor of the botanist David Douglas).

The name threadleaf ragwort stems from the appearance of the leaves. Other common names include: threadleaf groundsel, bush senecio, creek senecio, shrubby butterweed, comb butterweed, smooth threadleaf ragwort, Mono ragwort, Douglas ragwort, Douglas groundsel, sand wash groundsel, felty groundsel, old man, yerba cana, squawweed, and cenicillo.

=== Subspecies ===
- Senecio flaccidus Less. var. flaccidus
- Senecio douglasii DC. var. longilobus (Benth.) L.D. Benson
- Senecio douglasii DC. var. jamesii (Torr. & A. Gray) Ediger ex Correll & M.C. Johnst.
- Senecio douglasii DC. ssp. longilobus (Benth.) W.A. Weber
- Senecio flaccidus Less. var. monoensis (Greene) B. L. Turner & T. M. Barkley
- Senecio flaccidus Less. var. douglasii (DC.) B. L. Turner & T. M. Barkley
- Senecio flaccidus var. flaccidus

== Distribution and habitat ==
S. flaccidus can be found from the central to the southwestern United States, overlapping with the Great Plains region. It is native between Utah and Kansas, south to Arizona, New Mexico and Texas, and much of northern and central Mexico.

Like other members of its genus, it prefers disturbed habitats, especially overgrazed rangelands, dried-up streambeds and desert grasslands. It can be found at altitudes between 1,800 and 6,500 feet (550 and 1,980 m). It is common in gravelly washes, dry creek beds, along roads and trails, and mostly away from the coast.

Native range

Native

America

North-Central U.S.: Kansas, Oklahoma
Northwestern: Colorado
South-Central: New Mexico, Texas
Southwestern: Arizona,
Northern Mexico: Chihuahua, Coahuila, Durango, San Luis Potosí, Sonora, Zacatecas
Central Mexico: Aguascalientes, Guanajuato, Hidalgo, Jalisco (n.e.), Veracruz

Current

America

North-Central: Kansas, Oklahoma, Wyoming
Northwestern: Colorado
South-Central: New Mexico, Texas
Southwestern: Arizona, California, Nevada, Utah
Northern Mexico: Chihuahua, Coahuila, Durango, San Luis Potosí, Sonora, Zacatecas, Baja California
Central Mexico: Aguascalientes, Baja Norte, Guanajuato, Hidalgo, Jalisco (n.e.), Veracruz

== Ecology ==
Colonizing disturbed areas including over-grazed lands, S. flaccidus helps to achieve a quick groundcover and helps to stabilize the soil for longer-lived perennials.

== Toxicity ==
The species is poor forage for cattle and horses due to the alkaloids contained in the plant; these cause liver disease when consumed in large quantities.

Also known as Senecio longilobus, one of the alkaloids found in this species is longilobine, as well as senecionine, seneciphylline, florosenine, otonecine-based florosenine, and retrorsine.

== See also ==
- Pyrrolizidine
