= C7H13N =

The molecular formula C_{7}H_{13}N (molar mass: 111.18 g/mol, exact mass: 111.1048 u) may refer to:

- Pyrrolizidine
- Quinuclidine
