= Leioproctus gagateus =

Scientific classification
- Kingdom: Animalia
- Phylum: Arthropoda
- Clade: Pancrustacea
- Class: Insecta
- Order: Hymenoptera
- Family: Colletidae
- Genus: Leioproctus
- Species: L. gagateus

Binomial name
- Leioproctus gagateus Batley, 2025

Species of bee

Leioproctus gagateus, or Leioproctus (Exleycolletes) gagateus, is a species of bee in the family Colletidae and subfamily Colletinae. It is endemic to Australia. It was described by entomologist Michael Batley in 2025.

== Etymology ==
The specific epithet gagateus (Latinised Greek: "jet") refers to the black colour of both sexes.

== Description ==
The holotype male body length is 9.0 mm, head width 2.7 mm; the female paratype body length 11.9 mm, head width 3.4 mm. Integumental colouration is mainly black, with brown markings. The hair is white to brown.

== Distribution and habitat ==
The species occurs in central Australia. The type locality is 41 Mile Bore, on the Barkly Highway, in the Northern Territory. It has also been recorded from Kunnamuka Swamp, on the edge of the Simpson Desert in Central West Queensland.

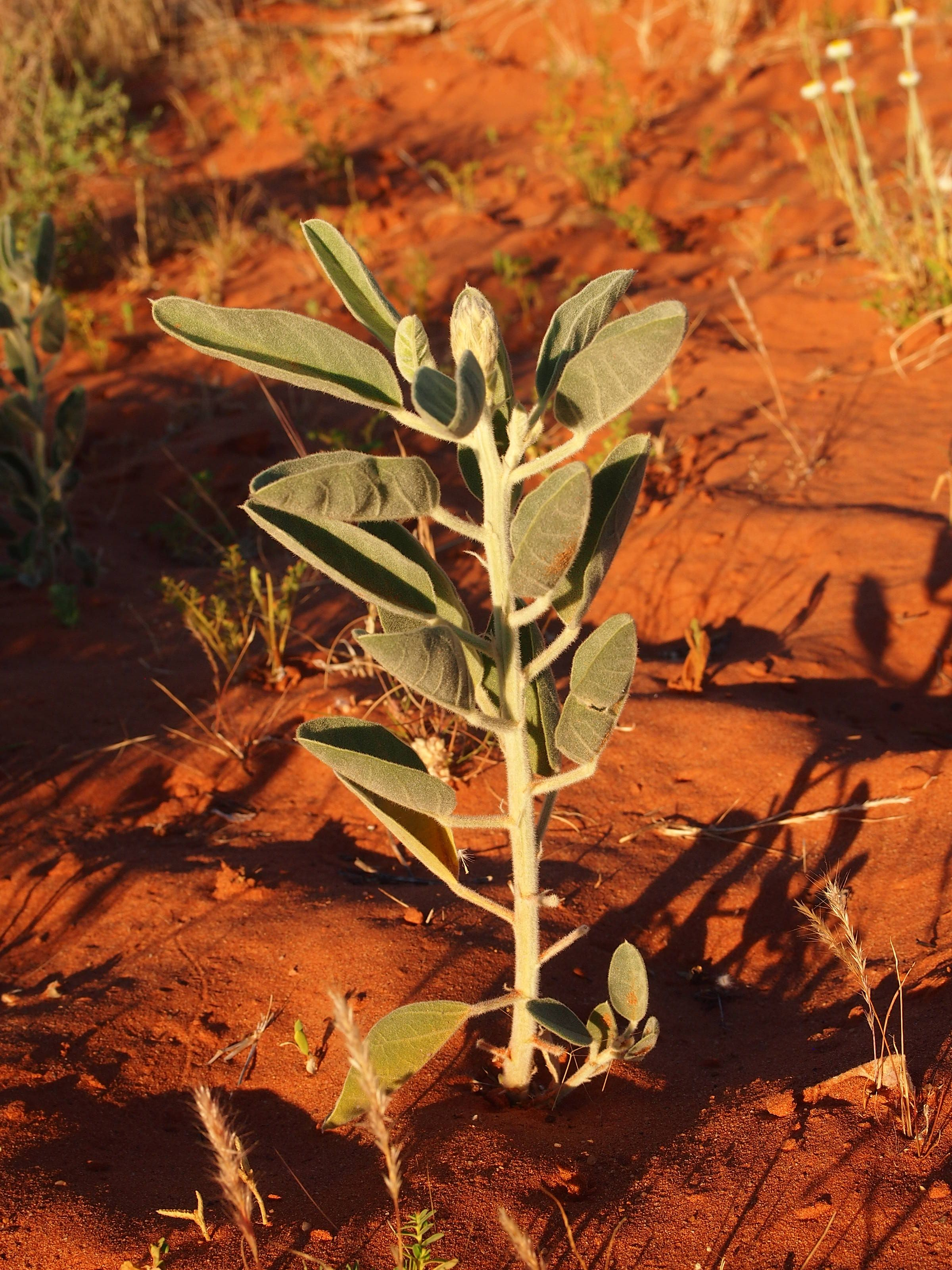
Crotalaria cunninghamii (parrot pea), a forage plant of the bees

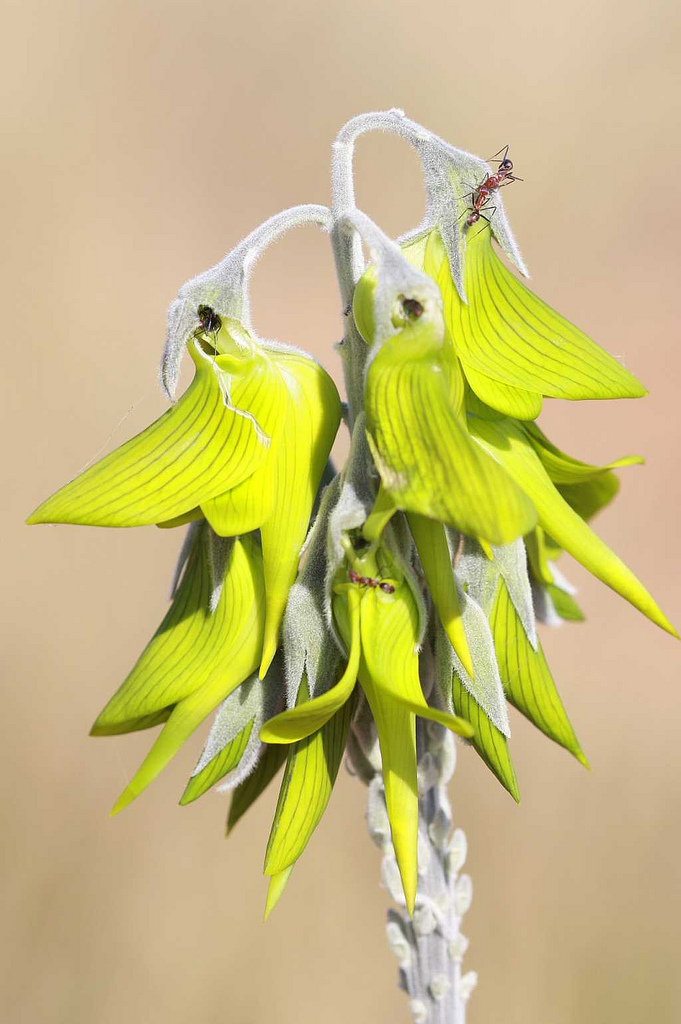
Flowers of Crotalaria cunninghamii

== Behaviour ==
The adults are flying mellivores. Flowering plants visited by the bees include Crotalaria cunninghamii.
