= 1,6-Dioxaspiro(4.4)nonane-2,7-dione =

Names
- Preferred IUPAC name 1,6-Dioxaspiro[4.4]nonane-2,7-dione

Identifiers
CAS Number	3505-67-7
3D model (JSmol)	Interactive image
ChemSpider	69487
ECHA InfoCard	100.020.455
EC Number	222-499-6
PubChem CID	77041
CompTox Dashboard (EPA)	DTXSID40188558
- InChI: InChI=1S/C7H8O4/c8-5-1-3-7(10-5)4-2-6(9)11-7/h1-4H2 Key: VTQYOGUFKHVWOO-UHFFFAOYSA-N
- SMILES: C1CC2(CCC(=O)O2)OC1=O

Properties
Chemical formula	C_{7}H_{8}O_{4}
Molar mass	156.14 g·mol^{−1}
- Except where otherwise noted, data are given for materials in their standard state (at 25 °C [77 °F], 100 kPa). Infobox references

1,6-Dioxaspiro[4.4]nonane-2,7-dione or spirodilactone is a spiro compound derived from the dicarboxylic acid 4,4-dihydroxypimelic acid, formed through double internal esterification into a symmetrical lactone. The short name spirodilactone is also occasionally used for the anellation Spiro[2-benzofuran-3,5'-oxolane]-1,2'-dione. The exceptionally straightforward synthesis of 1,6-dioxaspiro[4.4]nonane-2,7-dione from the platform chemical succinic acid offers promising prospects for future applications of this compound. The dilactone already serves as a starting material for heterocyclic pyrrolizidine, for the polyol 3-hydroxymethyl-1,3,6-hexanetriol, for esters of γ-ketopimelic acid, and as a dicarboxylic acid derivative for functional polymers such as polyethers and polyamides.

== Occurrence and representation ==
1,6-Dioxaspiro[4.4]nonane-2,7-dione (here referred to as the dilactone of acetone diacetic acid or hydrochelidonic acid) was first obtained in 1889 by Jacob Volhard through heating succinic acid or succinic anhydride, with the elimination of carbon dioxide, and was further characterized in 1892.

Synthesis of spirodilactone

Although the succinic acid or its anhydride used in the reaction "largely converts into a neutral, beautifully crystallizing substance", a significant residue consists of dark, oily, and resinous decomposition products. The pure spirodilactone can only be obtained from these residues through vacuum distillation and repeated recrystallization.

More recent publications indicate that adding small (catalytic) amounts of solid potassium hydroxide to succinic anhydride improves the reaction.

By reducing the reaction time and implementing continuous operation, yields exceeding 80% can be achieved.

A "Safety Note" warns that performing the reaction unattended (heating to 185 °C for several hours in a mantle heater) may result in explosive decomposition of the reaction mixture.

== Properties ==
1,6-Dioxaspiro[4.4]nonane-2,7-dione, in its pure form, crystallizes as large, colorless, transparent prismatic crystals that are soluble in many organic solvents. For purification, recrystallization from 95% ethanol is suitable. In aqueous media, hydrolysis to 4-oxoheptanedioic acid occurs.

Hydrolysis of spirodilactone

During ring opening, two geminal hydroxy groups are formed at the carbon atom in the 4-position, which, in accordance with the Erlenmeyer rule, are converted into a carbonyl group with the elimination of water.

== Applications ==
Reduction of spirodilactone with lithium aluminum hydride (LiAlH_{4}) yields the tetrahydric alcohol 3-hydroxymethyl-1,3,6-hexanetriol in high yield (89%).

Reduction of spirodilactone with LiAlH_{4}

As a dilactone, 1,6-dioxaspiro[4.4]nonane-2,7-dione can undergo transesterification with alcohols via ring opening to form diesters of 4-oxoheptanedioic acid. Using 2-ethylhexanol as the alcohol component produces excellent plasticizers for plastics such as polyvinyl chloride (PVC) (compound (A)), while reaction with methyl glycol yields a highly effective water-soluble paint stripper (compound (B)).

Diester of spirodilactone

From 1,6-dioxaspiro[4.4]nonane-2,7-dione, pyrrolizidine—the parent compound of hepatotoxic pyrrolizidine alkaloids—can be synthesized readily on an industrial scale.

The potential of 1,6-dioxaspiro[4.4]nonane-2,7-dione as a dicarboxylic acid equivalent for polymers with both thermoset and thermoplastic properties was studied extensively around 1990. Spirodilactams, obtained by reacting spirodilactone with primary functional amines, are highly rigid and temperature-resistant molecular building blocks for high-performance polymers.

Polymer building blocks from spirodilactams

Reaction with p-phenylenediamine (I) produces the spirodilactam-dianiline (SDA), while reaction with aminophenols yields the spirodilactam-diphenol (SDD). The diphenol derivative (SDD) in particular was used as a precursor for thermoplastics based on epoxy resin or maleimide and was identified as a potential substitute for bisphenol A (BPA). The resulting polymers exhibit glass transition temperatures (T_{g}) approximately 80 °C higher than those of BPA-based reference materials.

Fluorine-substituted aromatic compounds have been employed to synthesize thermoplastic aromatic polyethers and polyether ketones that display very high glass transition temperatures (>240 °C), low water absorption, low dielectric constants, and thermal stability exceeding 500 °C.

The ready availability of cost-effective succinic acid derived from renewable raw materials, together with the compound's promising potential as a building block for small molecules and polymers, could stimulate renewed research interest in 1,6-dioxaspiro[4.4]nonane-2,7-dione.
