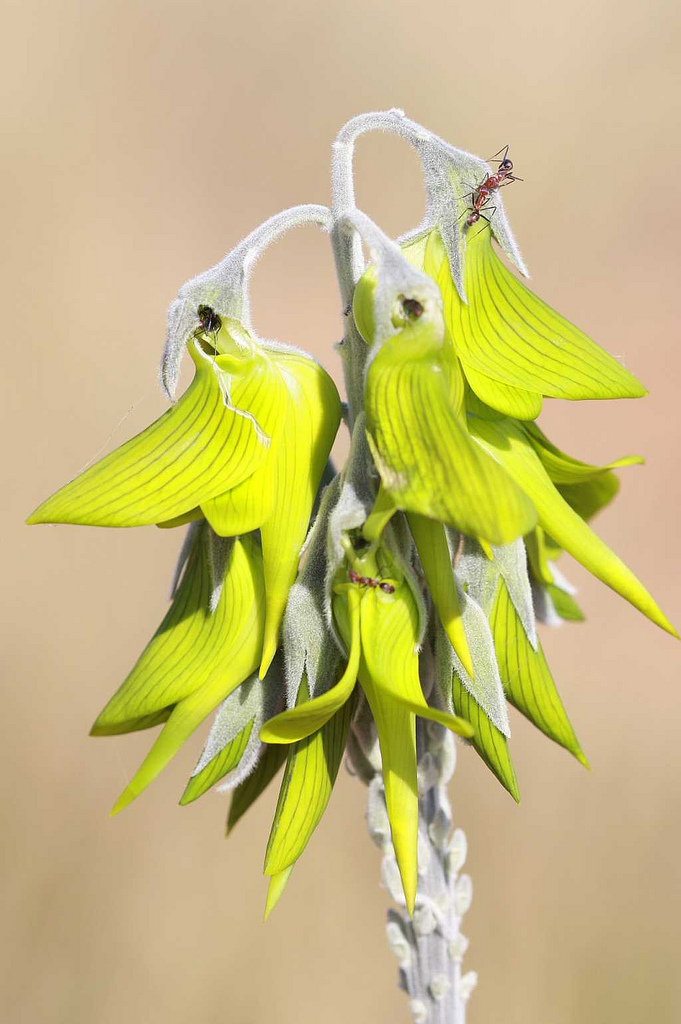

Conservation status
- Least Concern (IUCN 3.1)

Scientific classification
- Kingdom: Plantae
- Clade: Embryophytes
- Clade: Tracheophytes
- Clade: Spermatophytes
- Clade: Angiosperms
- Clade: Eudicots
- Clade: Rosids
- Order: Fabales
- Family: Fabaceae
- Subfamily: Faboideae
- Genus: Crotalaria
- Species: C. cunninghamii

Binomial name
- Crotalaria cunninghamii R.Br., 1849

= Crotalaria cunninghamii =

Species of legume

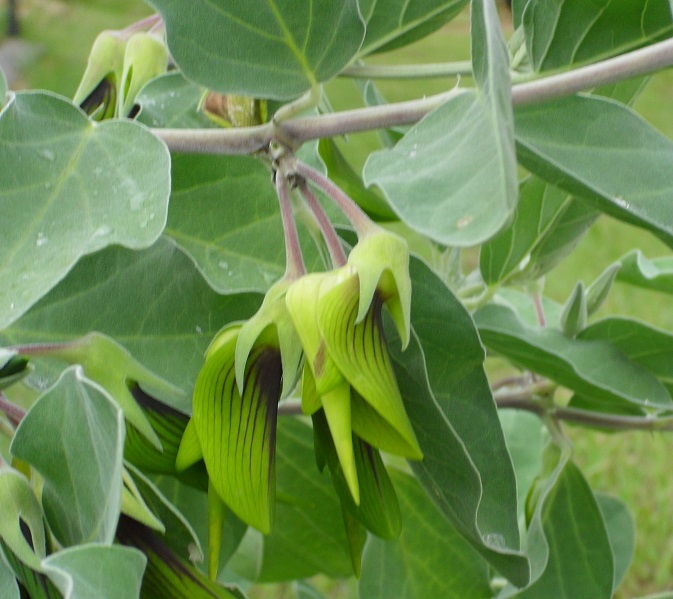
Crotalaria cunninghamii - this form has distinctive green flowers in axillary clusters.

Crotalaria cunninghamii, also known as green bird flower, bird flower ratulpo, parrot pea, or regal bird flower, is a plant of the legume family Fabaceae, named Crotalaria after the Greek word for rattle because their seeds rattle, and cunninghamii after early 19th-century botanist Allan Cunningham. Crotalaria cunninghamii is known as Mangarr to the Nyangumarta Warrarn Indigenous group.

Crotalaria cunninghamii is a short-lived perennial plant native to Australia, and its habitat is the deserts, coastlands, drainage lines, and sand dunes of the northern half of Western Australia and the Northern Territory. This habitat is semi-arid to temperate regions in well-drained soils. Crotalaria cunninghamii blooms from January to April. It is pollinated by large bees and by honeyeaters.

== Identification ==
Crotalaria cunninghamii was identified By Alan Cunningham on a naval expedition in North Western Western Australia in the 1810s. During a seven-month trip to North Western Western Australia in 1817, Cunningham collected more than 300 species, including Crotalaria cunninghamii. Alan Cunningham landed on the shores of Parramatta in 1816 and swiftly started exploring and identifying plant species in Australia. After recovering from a severe fever suffered during an expedition west of the Blue Mountains in 1817, Cunningham was asked to join a naval expedition to North West Western Australia, which he gladly accepted. Cunningham made two more naval expeditions over the following years. His third voyage was almost disrupted due to a serious leak. Their ship, the cutter Mermaid, was then promptly fixed in Careening Bay, and Cunningham was free to discover hundreds more plants in Australia before returning to England.

== Description ==
The green birdflower is a perennial shrub that grows to about 1–3 m in height. It has hairy or woolly branches and dull green foliage. The oval leaves are about 30 mm long, the large and greenish pea flowers are streaked with fine black lines, and the club-shaped seed pods are up to 50 mm long. The plant's flowers grow on long spikes at the ends of its branches. The flower greatly resembles a bird attached by its beak to the central stalk of the flowerhead. Crotalaria cunninghamii is non-allergenic, and its pods are large and almost square and are covered in a soft, green, hairy shell.

== Habitat ==
Crotalaria cunninghamii habitat is the arid to semi-arid zones of the tropics, including northern Western Australia, the Northern Territory, northern South Australia, and southwest Queensland. Crotalaria cunninghamii predominantly grows in well-drained soils in shrubland and grassland or savannah woodlands, usually on desert dunes, sandplains, and drainage lines. Crotalaria cunninghamii also grows in Mulga communities in arid regions. Mulga communities are 'hotspots' of resources, such as water holes in deserts. Mulga communities account for 20% of the total land mass of arid Australia.

== Uses and cultivation ==
=== Economic ===
Crotalaria cunninghamii has some economic purposes and is a good source of fibre used for weaving. Crotalaria cunninghamii is also a popular ornamental flower because of its unique shape. The Australian Botanic Gardens and Park Authority featured it as the in-season flower of the month in March 2019.

Crotalaria cunninghamii's primary economic use is as an ornament in houses. Another economic purpose is processing into a fibre to create ropes and fish nets. The fibre was used by Aboriginal peoples to make sandals, fishing nets, canvas, and even pulp. A paper by Ds Davidson, published in 1947, noted that the Warnman people, an Aboriginal Australian group, used Crotalaria cunninghamii to make canvas shoes. The Warnman people primarily lived in the Gibson Desert and used Crotalaria cunninghamii fibre shoes to protect their feet from the hot sand and rugged stony desert ground. The fibre was constructed by peeling off the soft bark and then tying the smaller fibres together and tying them around your feet. The Indigenous people of the Little Sandy Desert also used the plant in this way, as well as for belts to hang food, such as goanna, from.

Crotalaria cunninghamii has shown potential for use in commercial agriculture. Crotalaria cunninghamii has a symbiotic relationship with bacteria in the soil, which forms nodules and traps atmospheric nitrogen in the surrounding soil, making the species useful for replenishing soil nitrogen. Crotalaria cunninghamii and 17 other wildflower seeds were analysed by the Australian Journal of Agricultural Research to see whether their seeds were viable for the production of essential oils and hydrocarbons and used as human food. It was found that Crotalaria cunninghamii has a large percentage of crude oil and protein that could potentially be of use. Its ability to grow with little water and soil management and its high percentages of crude oil and proteins could make Crotalaria cunninghamii a useful plant economically to produce biofuel or human use of natural oils.

=== Medicinal ===
Crotalaria cunninghamii can also be used to provide medicinal support to humans; through a process of heating and boiling, the leaves can be used to treat eye infections, and the bark can be used to treat swelling of the limbs. Aboriginal Australians used Crotalaria cunninghamii to treat eye infections and pain. The use of Crotalaria cunninghamii as a medicine is not widespread today, but it has historically been proposed to potentially have use in homeopathy.

== Known hazards ==
There have been no reports of Crotalaria cunninghamii being toxic to humans; however, human toxicity has been seen in the Crotalaria genus. Many members of the Crotalaria genus are known to contain pyrrolizidine alkaloids, the most potent of which are monocrotaline, retrorsine, and retronecine. Pyrrolizidine alkaloids are found in 3% of plants globally. These alkaloids have a cumulative effect on the body and, thus, are entirely safe if only small amounts are consumed. Many of these alkaloids have pronounced toxicity known to decrease brain function, but the lungs and other organs may be affected as well. Mutagenic and carcinogenic properties of pyrrolizidine alkaloids have also been reported. Pyrrolizidine alkaloids are known to alter vitamin A metabolism in rats, depressing plasma levels in livestock livers, which can be fatal in some cases for animals.

== Abnormal pollinators ==
Crotalaria cunninghamii is usually pollinated by birds. During a study orchestrated by the Desert Ecology Research Group from the University of Sydney in 2011, it was found that during that period of unusually high rainfall in the Simpson Desert, rodents were observed eating and pollinating Crotalaria cunninghamii flowers. The rodents observed were the house mouse (Mus musculus) and the sandy inland mouse (Pseudomys hermannsburgensis). There was a similar ample rainfall in 2007; this unusual phenomenon was compared to where no rodents were observed. It was found that Crotalaria cunninghamii in 2011 had five times more inflorescences per plant, 90% more flowers per inflorescence, and two to three times more nectar per flower. Still, the nectar was 30% less sugar-rich. Rodents accessed the nectar by chewing a hole through the calyx, as opposed to how birds poke their beaks through the opening. The increase in the number of pollinators positively affected the propagation of the species.

The regular pollinators of Crotalaria cunninghamii are nectivorous birds, bugs and bees. These creatures derive their energy from the nectar of Crotalaria cunninghamii and in return they pollinate the plant. The way they pollinate Crotalaria cunninghamii is by picking up its pollen when feeding from one male plant and when they go to a female plant some of that pollen falls into the female plant's stigma.

== Threats to survival ==
The conservation status of Crotalaria cunninghamii is least concern. Possible threats to Crotalaria cunninghamii include habitat degradation. This species occurs predominantly on sandy soils which are easily eroded by rabbits, camels and other grazing animals. Crotalaria cunninghamii has been recognised as an endangered plant in NSW according to the NSW Threatened Species Conservation Act 1995. NSW is the southernmost reaches of Crotalaria cunninghamii's range and hence struggles to propagate as it does everywhere else in its habitat.

A general threat to Australian flowers and plants is the clearing of land for agricultural or other commercial uses. Crotalaria cunninghamii is not at high risk of land clearing for this purpose because it is confined to the Australian rangelands, which experience low rainfall, and therefore have limited potential for development.
