= Defibrotide =

Clinical data
- Trade names: Defitelio
- Other names: JZP-381, defibrotide sodium (JAN JP), defibrotide sodium (USAN US)
- AHFS/Drugs.com: Monograph
- License data: US DailyMed: Defibrotide
- Pregnancy category: AU: D
- Routes of administration: Intravenous
- ATC code: B01AX01 (WHO)

Legal status
- Legal status: AU: S4 (Prescription only); CA: ℞-only; UK: POM (Prescription only); US: ℞-only; EU: Rx-only; In general: ℞ (Prescription only)

Pharmacokinetic data
- Bioavailability: 58 - 70% by mouth (i.v. and i.m. = 100%)
- Elimination half-life: < 2 hours

Identifiers
- CAS Number: 83712-60-1
- DrugBank: DBSALT001719; DB04932
- ChemSpider: none
- UNII: L7CHH2B2J0
- KEGG: D07423
- ChEMBL: ChEMBL3707226; ChEMBL2108396

Defibrotide, sold under the brand name Defitelio, is a mixture of single-stranded oligonucleotides that is purified from the intestinal mucosa of pigs. It is used to treat veno-occlusive disease of the liver of people having had a bone marrow transplant, with different limitations in the US and the European Union. It works by protecting the cells lining blood vessels in the liver and preventing blood clotting; the way it does this is not well understood.

The most common side effects include abnormally low blood pressure (hypotension), diarrhea, vomiting, nausea and nosebleeds (epistaxis). Serious potential side effects that were identified include bleeding (hemorrhage) and allergic reactions. Defibrotide should not be used in people who are having bleeding complications or who are taking blood thinners or other medicines that reduce the body's ability to form clots. Use of the drug is generally limited by a strong risk of life-threatening bleeding in the brain, eyes, lungs, gastrointestinal tract, urinary tract, and nose. Some people have hypersensitivity reactions.

Defibrotide was approved for medical use in the European Union in October 2013, in the United States in March 2016, and in Australia in July 2020. Defibrotide is the first FDA-approved therapy for treatment of severe hepatic VOD, a rare and life-threatening liver condition.

== Medical uses ==
In the European Union defibrotide is indicated for the treatment of severe hepatic veno-occlusive disease (VOD) also known as sinusoidal obstructive syndrome (SOS) in hematopoietic stem-cell transplantation (HSCT) therapy for adults, adolescents, children, and infants over one month of age.

Defibrotide is used to treat veno-occlusive disease of the liver of people having had a bone marrow transplant, with different limitations in the US and the European Union. As of 2016, however, randomized placebo controlled trials have not been done.

Hematopoietic stem cell transplantation (HSCT) is a procedure performed in some people to treat certain blood or bone marrow cancers. Immediately before an HSCT procedure, a patient receives chemotherapy. Hepatic VOD can occur in people who receive chemotherapy and HSCT. Hepatic VOD is a condition in which some of the veins in the liver become blocked, causing swelling and a decrease in blood flow inside the liver, which may lead to liver damage. In the most severe form of hepatic VOD, the patient may also develop failure of the kidneys and lungs. Fewer than two percent of people develop severe hepatic VOD after HSCT, but as many as 80 percent of people who develop severe hepatic VOD do not survive.

It is administered by intravenous infusion in a doctor's office or clinic.

== Contraindications ==
Use of defibrotide for people who are already taking anticoagulants is dangerous and use of other drugs that affect platelet aggregation, like NSAIDs, should be done with care. Defibrotide should not be given to people who have a difficult time maintaining a steady blood pressure.

== Adverse effects ==
There is a high risk of bleeding and some people have had hypersensitivity reactions to defibrotide.

Common adverse effects, occurring in between 1 and 10% of people, included impaired blood clotting, vomiting, low blood pressure, bleeding in the brain, eyes, lungs, stomach or intestines, in the urine, and at catheterization sites.

Other side effects have included diarrhea, nosebleeds, sepsis, graft vs host disease, and pneumonia.

Pregnant women should not take defibrotide and women should not become pregnant while taking it; it has not been tested in pregnant women but at normal doses it caused hemolytic abortion in rats.

== Pharmacology ==
Defibrotide's mechanism of action is poorly understood. In vitro studies have shown that it protects the endothelium lining blood vessels from damage by fludarabine, a chemotherapy drug, and from a few other insults like serum starvation. It also appears to increase t-PA function and decrease plasminogen activator inhibitor-1 activity.

== Chemistry ==
Defibrotide is a mixture of single-stranded oligonucleotides. The chemical name is polydeoxyribonucleotide, sodium salt. It is purified from the intestinal mucosa of pigs.

== History ==
The efficacy of defibrotide was investigated in 528 participants treated in three studies: two prospective clinical trials and an expanded access study. The participants enrolled in all three studies had a diagnosis of hepatic VOD with liver or kidney abnormalities after hematopoietic stem cell transplantation (HSCT). The studies measured the percentage of participants who were still alive 100 days after HSCT (overall survival). In the three studies, 38 to 45 percent of participants treated with defibrotide were alive 100 days after HSCT. Based on published reports and analyses of participant-level data, the expected survival rates 100 days after HSCT would be 21 to 31 percent for participants with severe hepatic VOD who received only supportive care or interventions other than defibrotide.

== Society and culture ==
=== Legal status ===
Defibrotide was approved in the European Union for use in treating veno-occlusive disease of the liver of people having had a bone marrow transplant in 2013; Gentium had developed it. At the end of that year, Jazz Pharmaceuticals acquired Gentium.

In March 2016, the U.S. Food and Drug Administration (FDA) approved it for a similar use. Defibrotide is the first FDA-approved therapy for treatment of severe hepatic VOD, a rare and life-threatening liver condition. The FDA granted the application for defibrotide priority review status and orphan drug designation. The FDA granted approval of Defitelio to Jazz Pharmaceuticals.

Defibrotide was approved for medical use in Japan in June 2019.

Defibrotide was approved for medical use in Australia in July 2020.
