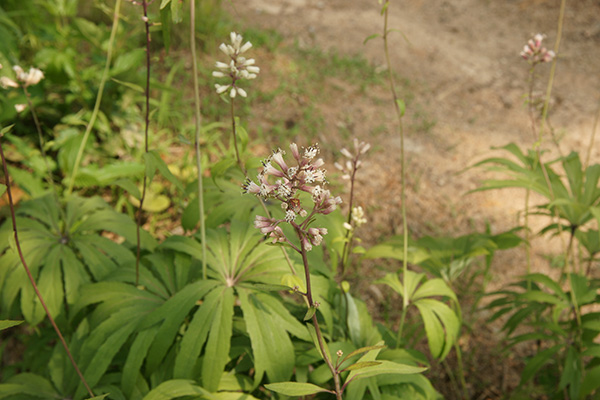
- Inflorescences reach well above the foliage
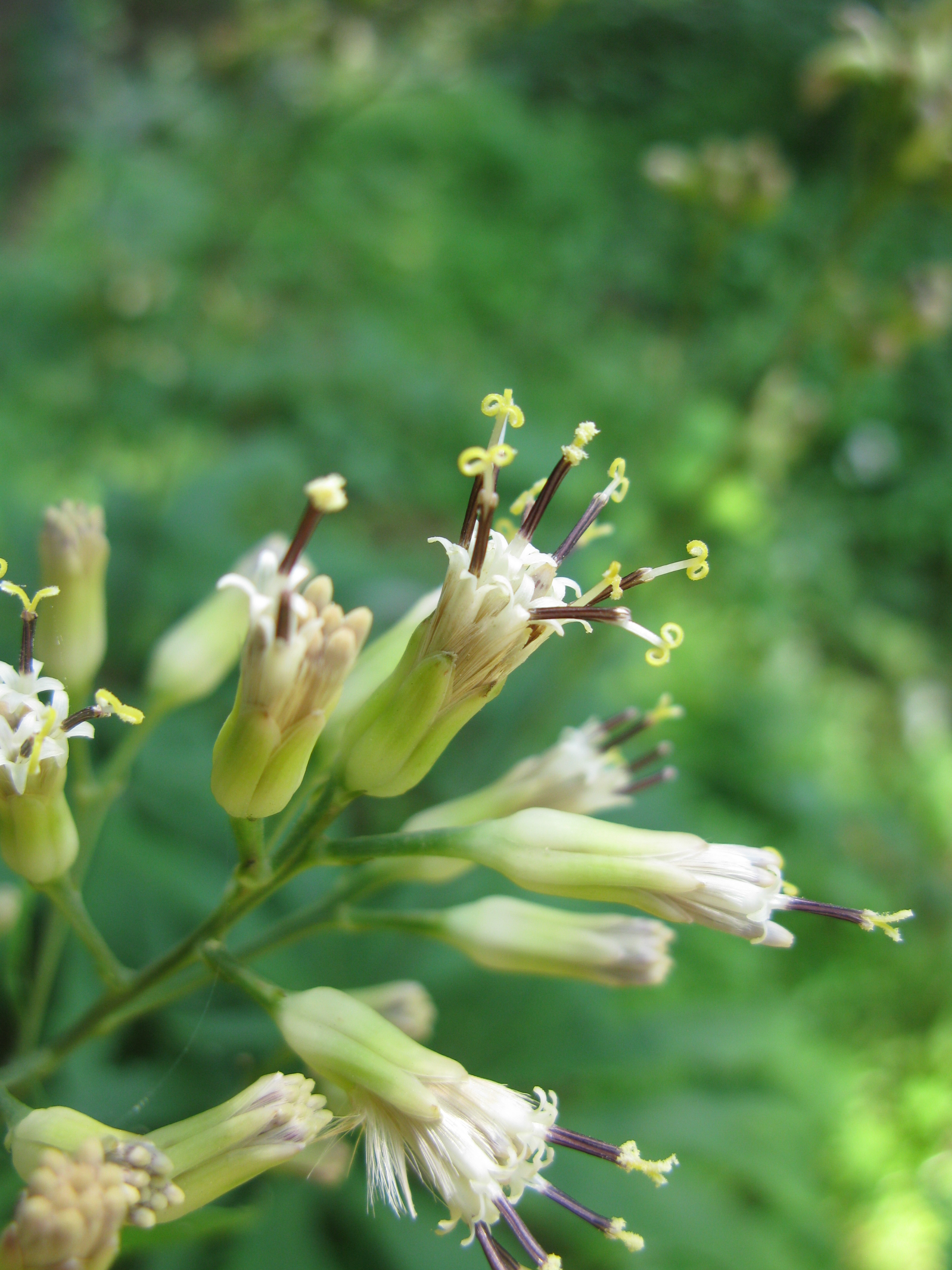
- Close-up of flowers

Scientific classification
- Kingdom: Plantae
- Clade: Embryophytes
- Clade: Tracheophytes
- Clade: Angiosperms
- Clade: Eudicots
- Clade: Asterids
- Order: Asterales
- Family: Asteraceae
- Genus: Syneilesis
- Species: S. palmata

Binomial name
- Syneilesis palmata Maxim.

Synonyms
- List: Arnica palmata Thunb.; Cacalia krameri (Franch. & Sav.) Matsum.; Cacalia palmata Makino; Cacalia taimingasa Nakai; Cacalia thunbergii Nakai; Doronicum palmatum Lam.; Senecio krameri Franch. & Sav.; Senecio palmatus Less.; Syneilesis palmata var. subconcolor Nakai; Syneilesis palmata f. subconcolor (Nakai) M.Kim

= Syneilesis palmata =

Species of flowering plant

Syneilesis palmata, the palmate umbrella plant or shredded umbrella plant, is a species of flowering plant in the family Asteraceae, native to Korea and Japan. A spreading rhizomatous perennial, at maturity its foliage typically reaches 60 cm (24 in), and its inflorescences extend to about twice that height. Recommended for specimen and mass plantings in shade gardens, it is hardy in USDA zones 5 through 8. It flowers in late summer.
