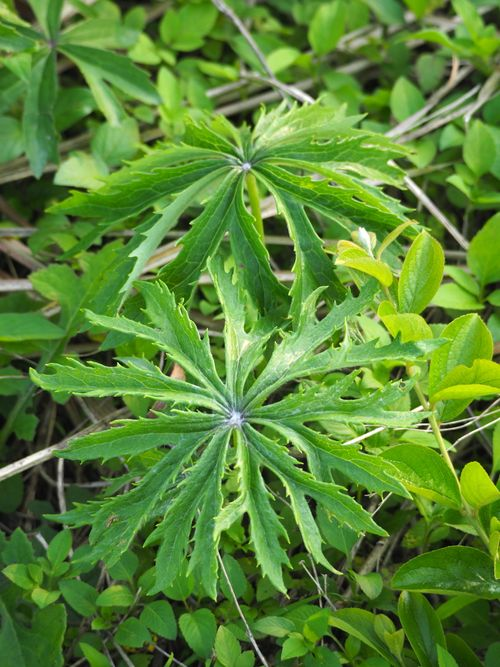

Scientific classification
- Kingdom: Plantae
- Clade: Tracheophytes
- Clade: Angiosperms
- Clade: Eudicots
- Clade: Asterids
- Order: Asterales
- Family: Asteraceae
- Genus: Syneilesis
- Species: S. hayatae

Binomial name
- Syneilesis hayatae (Hayata) Kitam.

Synonyms
- Cacalia intermedia Hayata (1919); Senecio intermedius Hayata (1906); Syneilesis intermedia Kitam. (1937)

= Syneilesis hayatae =

Species of plant

Syneilesis hayatae（Chinese: 臺灣破傘菊） is one of two Taiwanese endemic plants in the genus Syneilesis (the other being the alpine syneilesis, Syneilesis subglabrata), it is known as the Taiwan rabbit umbrella. Compared to the relatively stable population of Syneilesis subglabrata, this species was once thought to be extinct due to the lack of collection records for over half a century after World War II. In 2008 that the species was rediscovered in the lowland grasslands of Miaoli. Due to its small population size, the species was listed as “Critically Endangered (CR)” in the “Red List of Taiwan Vascular Plants, 2017.”

== Description ==
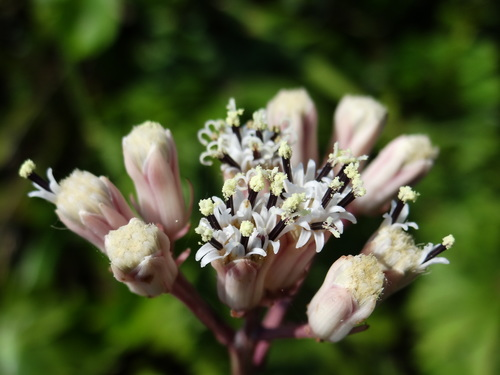
Syneilesis hayatae flowers

A medium to large herbaceous plant that can reach a height of 80 to 160 cm, the plant is glabrous throughout. The leaves are subcoriaceous and gradually elongate from the base of the plant to the upper internodes. The leaves near the base are peltate-ovate, approximately 35 cm in diameter, with long petioles and peltate-shaped attachments. The lamina is palmately deeply-lobed, resembling an upright umbrella on the ground. The lobes are generally 5 to 9 in number and are bifid (once or twice) with an acute apex and irregularly incised serrations along the leaf margin. The cauline leaves on the upper part of the plant are smaller in size, with shorter petioles, narrower lamina, and less obvious leaf lobes. The inflorescences are light pink and corymbose on the inflorescence axis. A single flower head is composed of about 14 to 16 tubular flowers, surrounded by two whorls of involucral bracts. The corolla of a single flower is five-lobed and white, with a pedicel 5 to 16 mm in length.

This species, and another endemic plant of Taiwan, Syneilesis subglabrata are in the same genus. They can be effectively distinguished by their geographical distribution, inflorescence, and leaf lobe morphology. Syneilesis hayatae is only distributed in the lowland grasslands of Miaoli, with robust plants and corymbose head flowers and shallower serrations along the leaf margin (approaching serrated margins). Syneilesis subglabrata is endemic to the mountainous regions of central Taiwan, found under the forest canopy at an altitude of 1200 to 2800 meters. The plant is slender, the flower heads are arranged conically, and the serrations along the leaf margin are deeper (approaching lobes).

== Distribution and habitat ==
The Syneilesis genus is a group of Asteraceae species endemic to East Asia. There are 6 known species worldwide., with two species in Taiwan, both of which are endemic to Taiwan. Among them, Syneilesis hayatae is limited to open grasslands at altitudes of 300 to 500 meters in Miaoli, mostly located in lowland hills or cemeteries.

== Taxonomy ==
=== Discovery and early taxonomy ===
Taiwan Syneilesis was first collected by a French missionary, Urbain Jean Faurie) in 1903 from “Bioritsu,” which is present-day Miaoli. The specimen was cited by Bunzo Hayata in 1906 and was published as a new species, Senecio intermedius Hayata. It was later reclassified in Cacalia as Cacalia intermedia (Hayata) Hayata. It was not until 1937 that the species was reclassified by Shiro Kitamura as Syneilesis intermedia (Hayata) Kitam., and this classification is still in use now.

Collection records for this species have always been scarce. Only 3 specimens were known during the Japanese occupation period. They were collected by Takiya Kawakami and Syuniti Sasaki, Yaichi Shimada, and Tokio Suzuki, in 1911, 1923, and 1940, respectively, all from Tongxiao, Miaoli. After World War II, no new collection records were added up until the publication of the Asteraceae chapter of the second edition of “Flora of Taiwan” in 1998. Ching-Yi Peng et al. noted that the species has not been "collected for more than 70 years, possibly extinct".

=== Rediscovery ===
In 2008, an ecological observer, Chih-Chung Tsai, accidentally discovered a wild population of Taiwan Syneilesis while investigating plants of the Grewia genus in Miaoli. The distribution range was approximately 50 to 100 square meters. It was confirmed that this species still exists in Taiwan in association with Echinops grijsii, Aster shimadae, Prunus pogonostyla, Styrax matsumurae, Bupleurum kaoi, and other rare species. The “Red List of Vascular Plants in Taiwan, 2017” listed the species as “Critically Endangered (CR)” based on the fact that the population is occupying an area of less than 10 square km, has only one habitat, with fewer than 50 mature individuals.

== Controversies ==
Since its rediscovery in 2008, the original habitat has become one of the key destinations for plant enthusiasts, which also resulted in controversies. It was suspected that the species were subjected to a large-scale excavation and over-collection in 2010. The process also has a negative impact on the Echinops grijsii population nearby.
