= FAM114A2 =

Protein-coding gene in the species Homo sapiens

Identifiers
- Aliases: FAM114A2, 133K02, C5orf3, family with sequence similarity 114 member A2
- External IDs: MGI: 1917629; HomoloGene: 10270; GeneCards: FAM114A2; OMA:FAM114A2 - orthologs

Gene location (Human)
Chr.	Chromosome 5 (human)
Band	5q33.2	Start	153,990,148 bp
Band	5q33.2	End	154,038,936 bp

Gene location (Mouse)
Chr.	Chromosome 11 (mouse)
Band	11|11 B1.3	Start	57,373,819 bp
Band	11|11 B1.3	End	57,409,443 bp
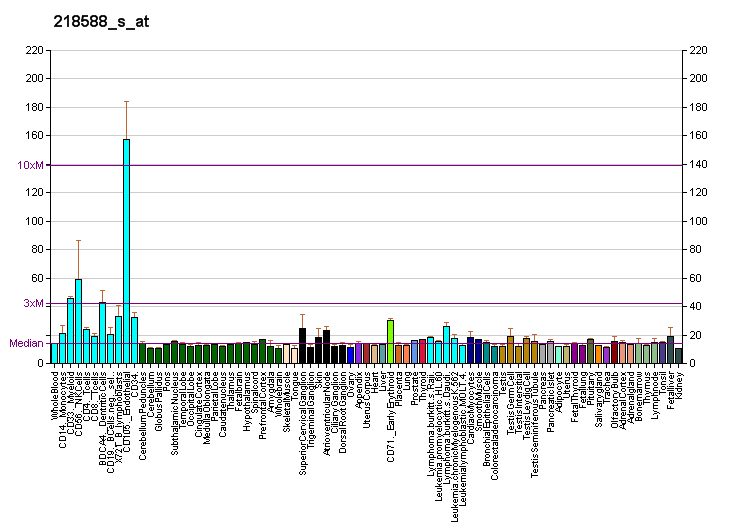
RNA expression pattern
Bgee	Human / Mouse (ortholog); Top expressed in: epithelium of colon; Achilles tendon; secondary oocyte; sperm; testicle; Epithelium of choroid plexus; islet of Langerhans; body of pancreas; left testis; right testis / Top expressed in: seminal vesicula; condyle; Rostral migratory stream; muscle of thigh; granulocyte; neural layer of retina; ganglionic eminence; saccule; lacrimal gland; vestibular sensory epithelium; More reference expression data
BioGPS	More reference expression data
Gene ontology
Molecular function	purine nucleotide binding
Cellular component	cellular component
Biological process	biological process
Sources:Amigo / QuickGO
Orthologs
Species	Human	Mouse
Entrez	10827	67726
Ensembl	ENSG00000055147	ENSMUSG00000020523
UniProt	Q9NRY5	Q8VE88
RefSeq (mRNA)	NM_018691; NM_001317993; NM_001317994; NM_001317995	NM_001168667; NM_001168668; NM_026342
RefSeq (protein)	NP_001304922; NP_001304923; NP_001304924; NP_061161	NP_001162138; NP_001162139; NP_080618
Location (UCSC)	Chr 5: 153.99 – 154.04 Mb	Chr 11: 57.37 – 57.41 Mb
PubMed search
- Wikidata
View/Edit Human	View/Edit Mouse

FAM114A2 (chromosome 5 open reading frame 3) is a gene on chromosome 5 in humans that encodes a protein FAM114A2. The protein function is not well known. FAM114A2 is, however, highly conserved in mammals with homologs both in fungi and plants.

Species	Accession #	Identity
macaca mulatta	XM_001102467	78.1%
Pan troglodytes	XM_518045	89.7%
bos taurus	NP_001033166	85.6%
Pongo abelii	XM_002816109	87.8%
Mus musculus	NM_026342.3	79%
Callithrix jacchus	XP_002744467	94.7%

== Protein ==
The FAM114A2 protein is 505 amino acids long with a molecular weight of 55.5 kdal and an isoelectric point of 4.66. It is predicted to stay in the nucleus after translation There is evidence that c5orf3 interacts with another protein of unknown function from chromosome 5, c5orf4 This protein is thought to include a P loop that suggests a role in ATP- and/or GTP-binding

== Gene ==
The FAM114A2 gene is located on chromosome 5 (5q31-33). This gene has 14 exons spanning through its sequence. The coding sequence is 2886 base pairs with a 5’ UTR of 94 base pairs and a 3’ UTR of 1273 base pairs. It is expressed at high levels in most tissues of the human body. It is also highly expressed in tissues in the human brain
