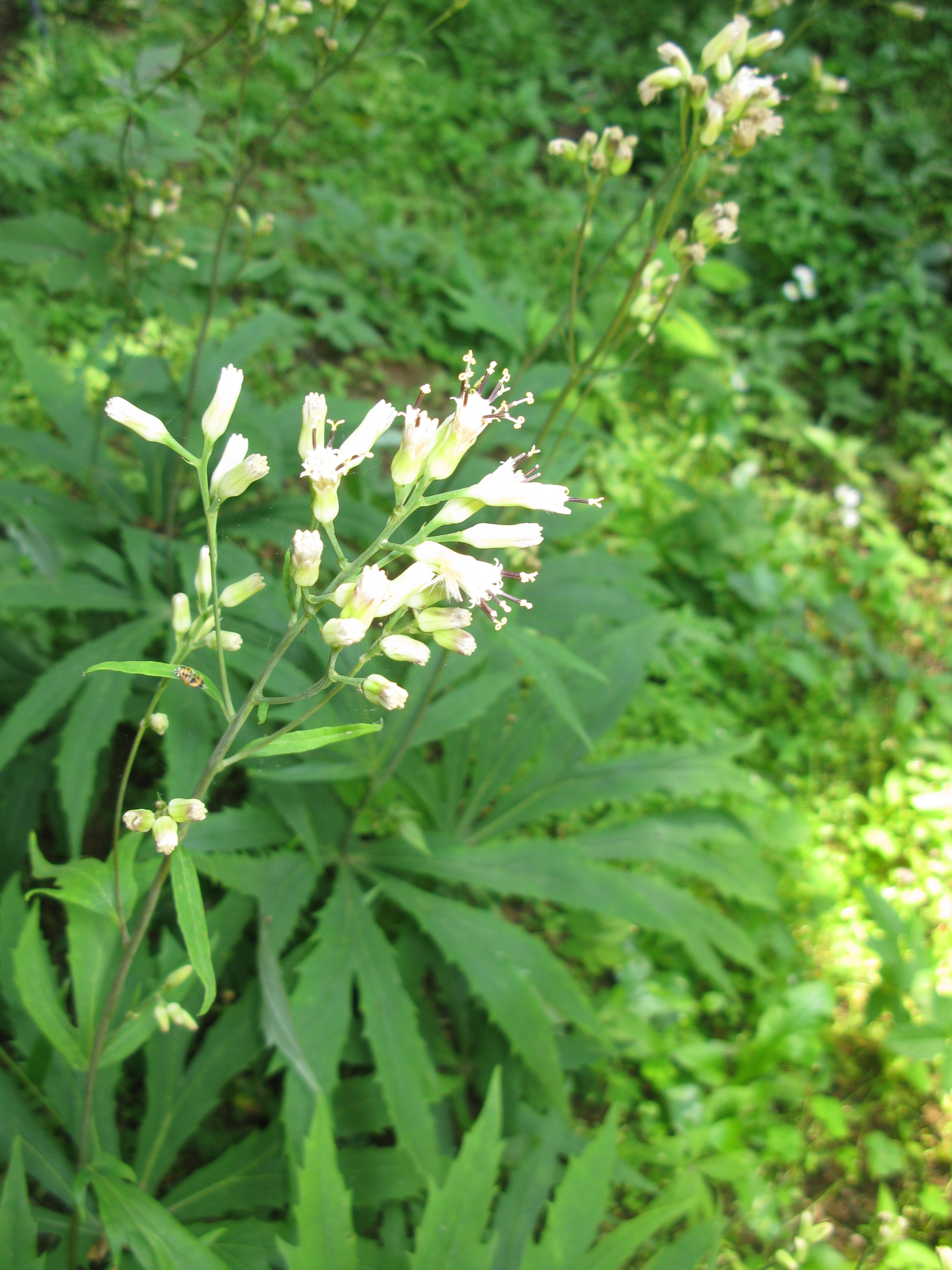
- Syneilesis palmata

Scientific classification
- Kingdom: Plantae
- Clade: Tracheophytes
- Clade: Angiosperms
- Clade: Eudicots
- Clade: Asterids
- Order: Asterales
- Family: Asteraceae
- Subfamily: Asteroideae
- Tribe: Senecioneae
- Genus: Syneilesis; Maxim. (1859)

= Syneilesis =

Genus of plants

Syneilesis is a genus of East Asian plants in the groundsel tribe within the Asteraceae.

== Species ==
Seven species are accepted.

- Syneilesis aconitifolia (Bunge) Maxim. – Amur, Primorye, Khabarovsk, Anhui, Fujian, Gansu, Guizhou, Hebei, Heilongjiang, Henan, Jiangsu, Liaoning, Shaanxi, Shanxi, Zhejiang, Japan, Korea
- Syneilesis akagii Kadota & Mas.Saito – Japan
- Syneilesis australis Y.Ling – Anhui, Zhejiang
- Syneilesis hayatae Kitam. – Taiwan
- Syneilesis palmata (Lam.) Maxim. – Japan, Korea
- Syneilesis subglabrata (Yamam. & Sasaki) Kitam. – Taiwan
- Syneilesis tagawae (Kitam.) Kitam. – Shikoku
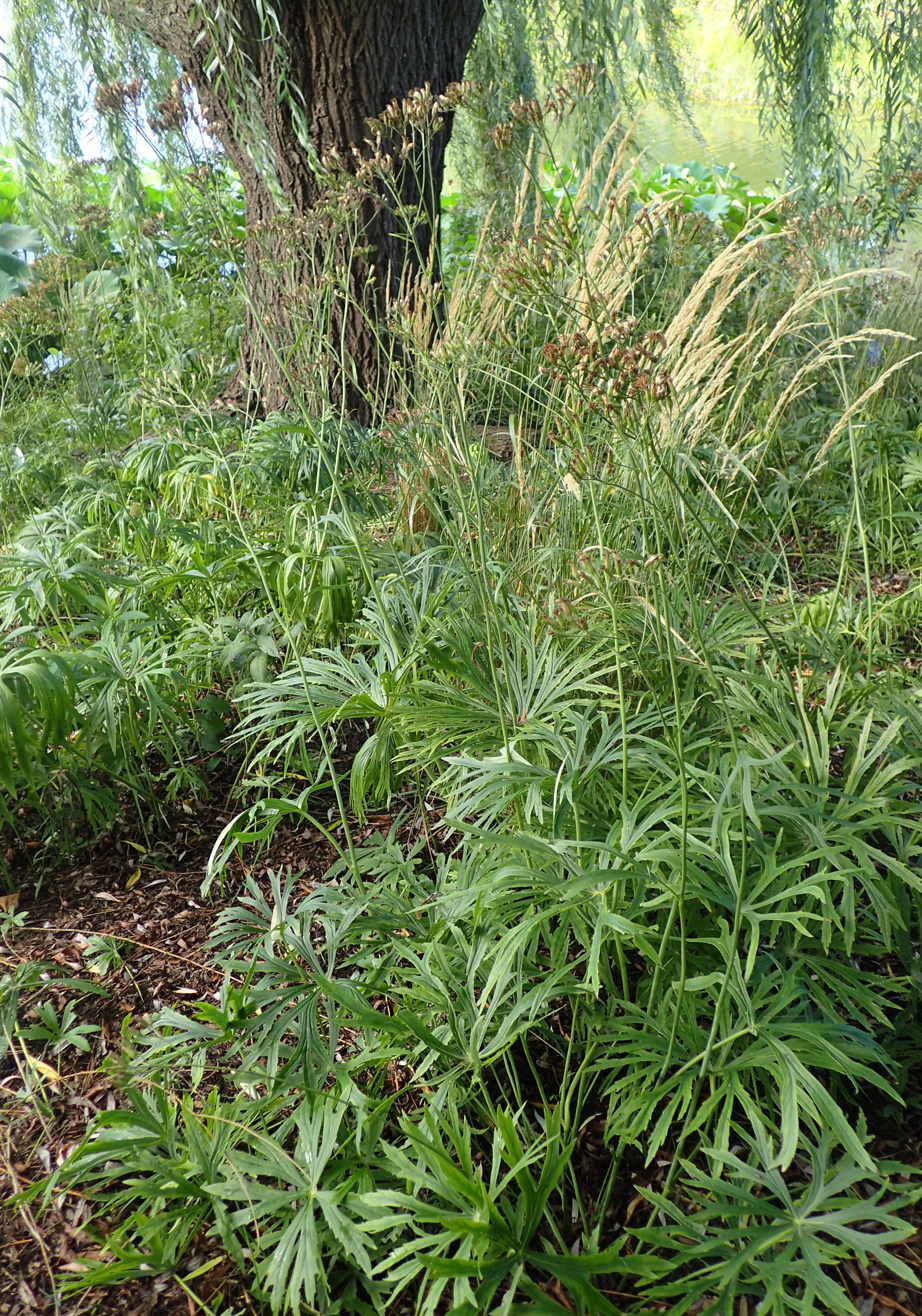
Syneilesis aconitifolia

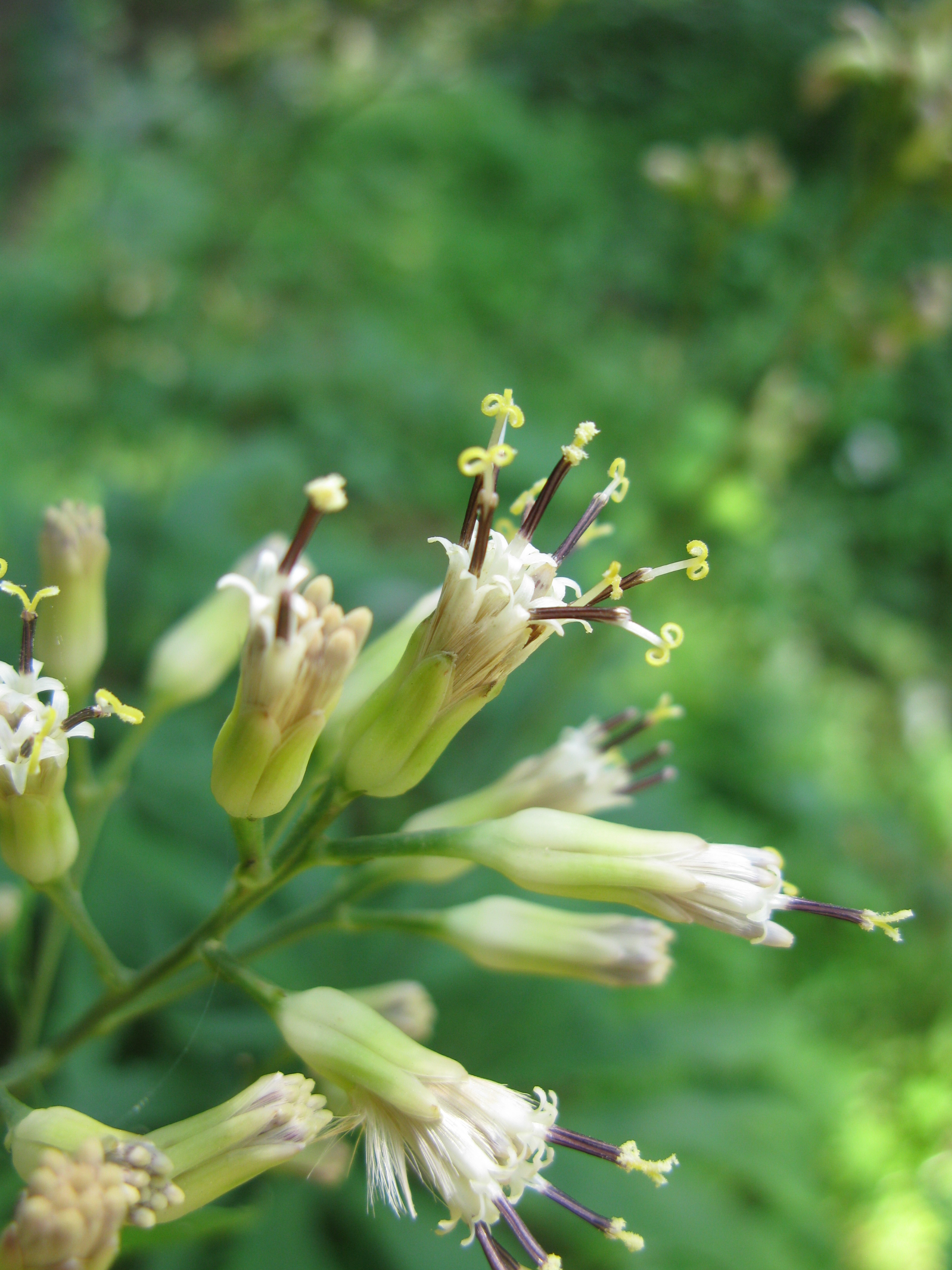
Syneilesis palmata
