= GOLM1 =

Protein-coding gene in the species Homo sapiens

Identifiers
- Aliases: GOLM1, C9orf155, GOLPH2, GP73, HEL46, PSEC0257, bA379P1.3, golgi membrane protein 1
- External IDs: OMIM: 606804; MGI: 1917329; HomoloGene: 12346; GeneCards: GOLM1; OMA:GOLM1 - orthologs

Gene location (Human)
| Chr. | Chromosome 9 (human) |
| Band | 9q21.33 | Start | 86,026,146 bp |
| Band | 9q21.33 | End | 86,100,173 bp |

Gene location (Mouse)
| Chr. | Chromosome 13 (mouse) |
| Band | 13|13 B2 | Start | 59,782,440 bp |
| Band | 13|13 B2 | End | 59,823,625 bp |
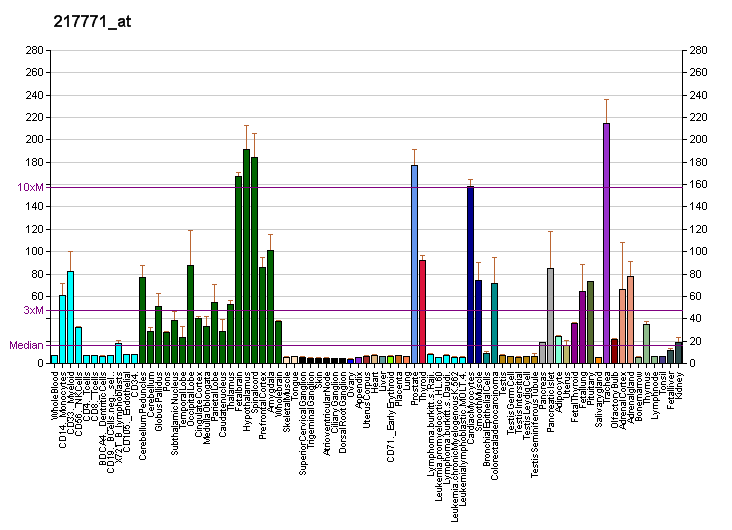
RNA expression pattern
| Bgee | Human / Mouse (ortholog); Top expressed in: palpebral conjunctiva; ventricular zone; mucosa of colon; mucosa of sigmoid colon; right adrenal cortex; gallbladder; rectum; left adrenal cortex; tendon of biceps brachii; ganglionic eminence / Top expressed in: epithelium of stomach; pyloric antrum; left colon; mucous cell of stomach; crypt of lieberkuhn of small intestine; Paneth cell; ileum; duodenum; cervix; abdominal wall; More reference expression data |
| BioGPS | More reference expression data |
Gene ontology
| Molecular function | protein binding |
| Cellular component | integral component of membrane; integral component of plasma membrane; extracellular exosome; membrane; extracellular space; Golgi apparatus; endoplasmic reticulum lumen |
| Biological process | regulation of lipid metabolic process; nucleus organization; post-translational protein modification |
Sources:Amigo / QuickGO
Orthologs
| Species | Human | Mouse |
| Entrez | 51280 | 105348 |
| Ensembl | ENSG00000135052 | ENSMUSG00000021556 |
| UniProt | Q8NBJ4 | Q91XA2 |
| RefSeq (mRNA) | NM_177937; NM_001099268; NM_016548 | NM_001035122; NM_027307 |
| RefSeq (protein) | NP_057632; NP_808800 | NP_001030294; NP_081583 |
| Location (UCSC) | Chr 9: 86.03 – 86.1 Mb | Chr 13: 59.78 – 59.82 Mb |
| PubMed search |
- Wikidata
| View/Edit Human | View/Edit Mouse |

Golgi membrane protein 1 (GOLM1) also known as Golgi phosphoprotein 2 or Golgi membrane protein GP73 is a protein that in humans is encoded by the GOLM1 gene. Two alternatively spliced transcript variants encoding the same protein have been described for this gene.

== Function ==
The Golgi complex plays a key role in the sorting and modification of proteins exported from the endoplasmic reticulum. The protein encoded by this gene is a type II Golgi transmembrane protein. It processes protein synthesized in the rough endoplasmic reticulum and assists in the transport of protein cargo through the Golgi apparatus. The expression of this encoded protein has been observed to be upregulated in response to viral infection.

== Clinical significance ==
Golgi membrane protein 1 is overexpressed in prostate cancer and lung adenocarcinoma tissue.

Blood levels of GP73 are higher in patients with liver cancer than in healthy individuals. In addition, levels were not significantly higher in patients with diseases other than liver disease. The current blood test used to screen for early tumors in people at high risk for liver cancer involves the alpha-fetoprotein (AFP). Patients who are at risk for non-metastatic, or primary, liver cancer typically have chronic liver disease such as cirrhosis. Such cases of cirrhosis are usually due to infection caused by infectious hepatitis (usually hepatitis B or hepatitis C, though there are other strains), or because of degenerative fatty liver disease (which can be especially severe in those with alcoholism). However, the AFP test is not usually sensitive enough to detect liver cancer in time and it often generates false positives. So far, the blood samples of more than 1,000 patients with various stages of liver and non-liver disease have been tested for the presence of GP73 in several studies. Several medical diagnostic companies are in the process of developing automated serum tests for the protein that could be performed in routine hospital laboratories.
