= SP110 =

Protein-coding gene in the species Homo sapiens

Identifiers
- Aliases: SP110, IFI41, IFI75, IPR1, VODI, SP110 nuclear body protein
- External IDs: OMIM: 604457; MGI: 3783243; GeneCards: SP110
Available structures
PDB	Human UniProt search: PDBe RCSB
PDB	List of PDB id codes 1UFN

Gene location (Human)
Chr.	Chromosome 2 (human)
Band	2q37.1	Start	230,165,186 bp
Band	2q37.1	End	230,225,729 bp
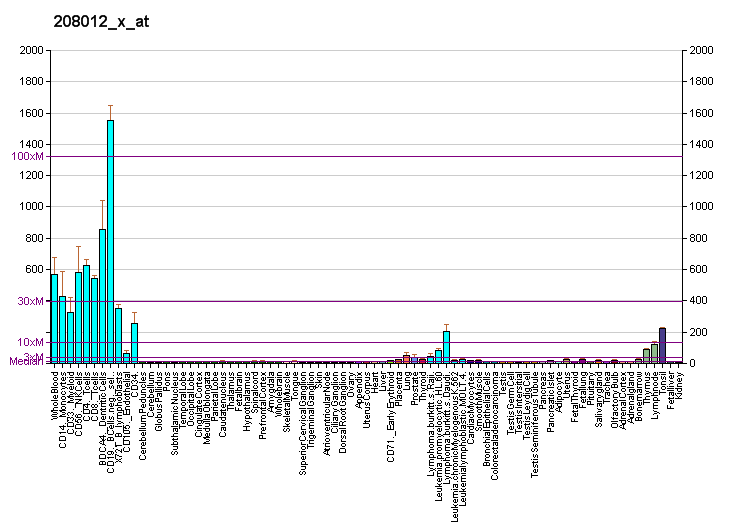

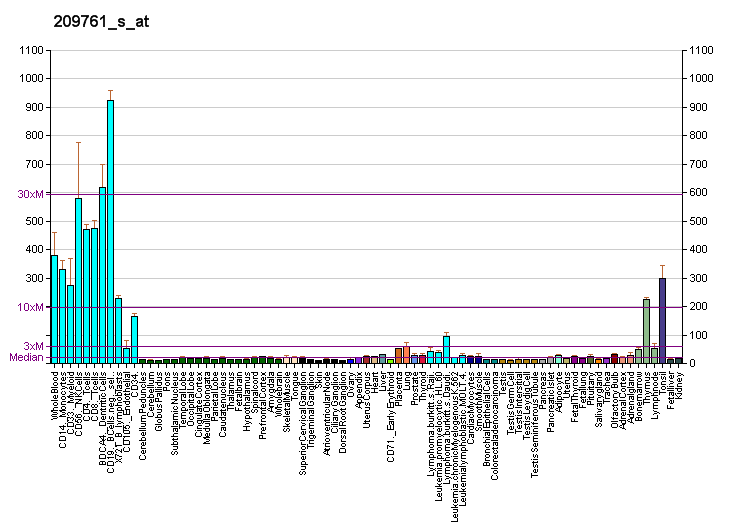

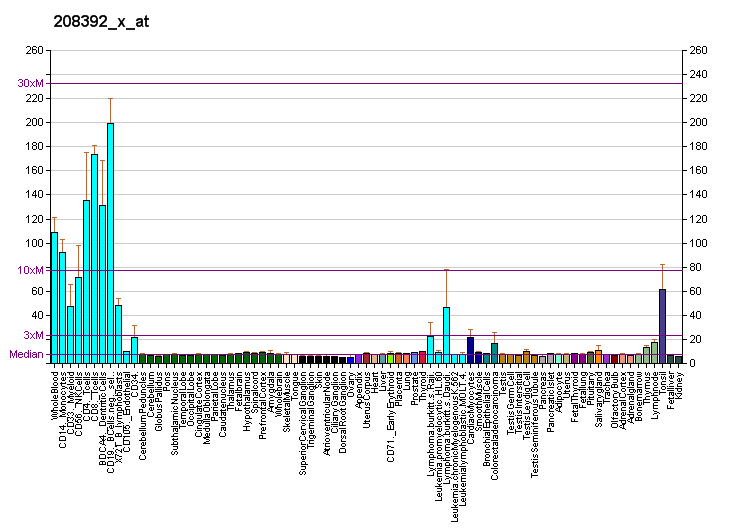
RNA expression pattern
Bgee	Human / Mouse (ortholog); Top expressed in: monocyte; blood; lymph node; spleen; granulocyte; appendix; tendon of biceps brachii; buccal mucosa cell; sural nerve; bone marrow cell / n/a; More reference expression data
BioGPS	More reference expression data
Gene ontology
Molecular function	signal transducer activity; metal ion binding; DNA binding; DNA-binding transcription factor activity, RNA polymerase II-specific
Cellular component	nucleus
Biological process	regulation of transcription, DNA-templated; transcription, DNA-templated; viral process; signal transduction; regulation of transcription by RNA polymerase II
Sources:Amigo / QuickGO
Orthologs
Databases	NCBI: entry; OMA: entry
Species	Human	Mouse
Entrez	3431	101056250
Ensembl	ENSG00000135899	n/a
UniProt	Q9HB58	n/a
RefSeq (mRNA)	NM_001185015; NM_004509; NM_004510; NM_080424; NM_001378442 NM_001378443; NM_001378444; NM_001378445; NM_001378446; NM_001378447	n/a
RefSeq (protein)	NP_001171944; NP_004500; NP_004501; NP_536349; NP_001365371 NP_001365372; NP_001365373; NP_001365374; NP_001365375; NP_001365376	n/a
Location (UCSC)	Chr 2: 230.17 – 230.23 Mb	n/a
PubMed search
- Wikidata
View/Edit Human	View/Edit Mouse

SP110 nuclear body protein is a protein that in humans is encoded by the SP110 gene.

The nuclear body is a multiprotein complex that may have a role in the regulation of gene transcription. This gene is a member of the SP100/SP140 family of nuclear body proteins and encodes a leukocyte-specific nuclear body component. The protein can function as an activator of gene transcription and may serve as a nuclear hormone receptor coactivator. In addition, it has been suggested that the protein may play a role in ribosome biogenesis and in the induction of myeloid cell differentiation. Alternative splicing has been observed for this gene and three transcript variants, encoding distinct isoforms, have been identified.
