= Retronecine =

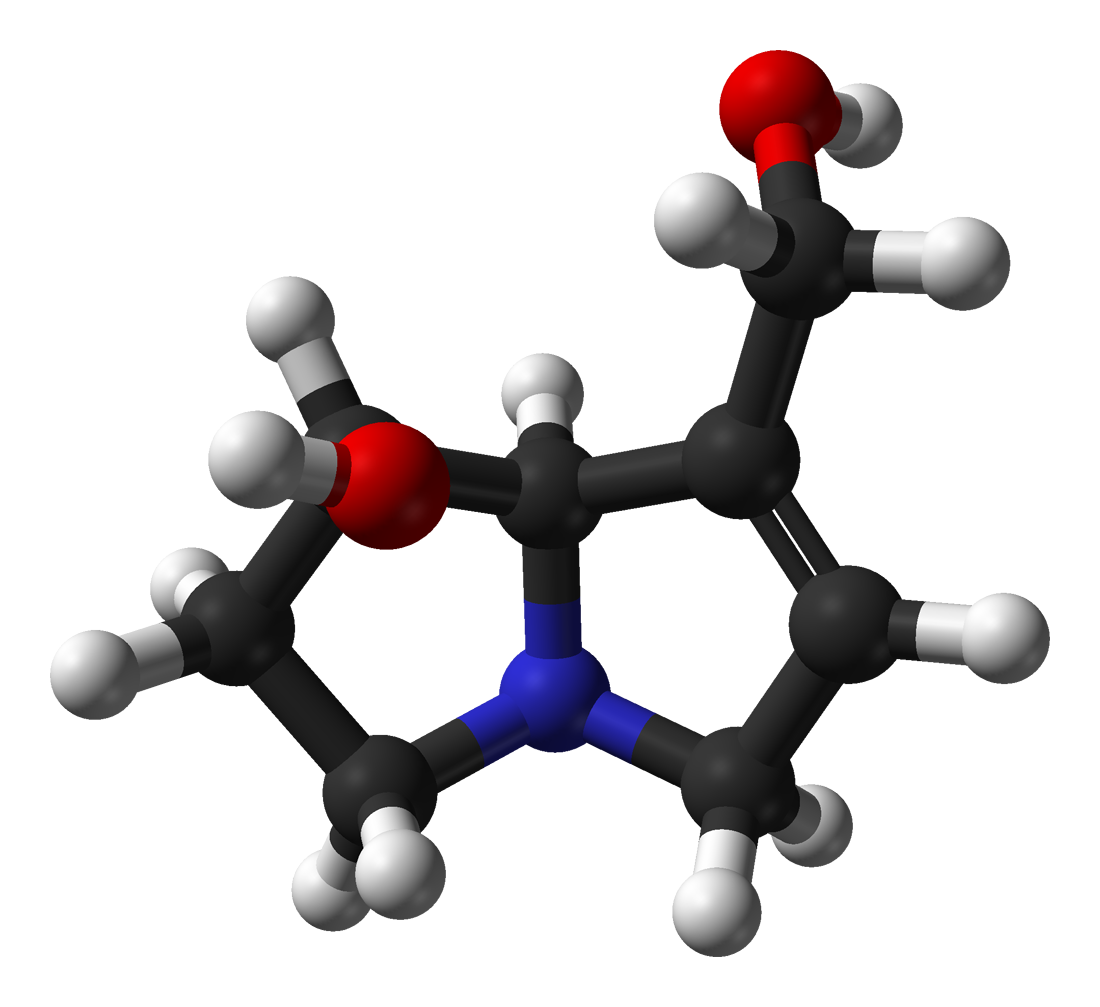

Names
- Preferred IUPAC name (1R,7aR)-7-(Hydroxymethyl)-2,3,5,7a-tetrahydro-1H-pyrrolizin-1-ol
- Other names (+)-Retronecine; Retronecin; Senecifolinene

Identifiers
CAS Number	480-85-3
3D model (JSmol)	Interactive image
ChemSpider	9783
PubChem CID	10198
UNII	2P5723M6II
CompTox Dashboard (EPA)	DTXSID401020156
- InChI: InChI=1S/C8H13NO2/c10-5-6-1-3-9-4-2-7(11)8(6)9/h1,7-8,10-11H,2-5H2/t7-,8-/m1/s1 Key: HJSJELVDQOXCHO-HTQZYQBOSA-N; InChI=1/C8H13NO2/c10-5-6-1-3-9-4-2-7(11)8(6)9/h1,7-8,10-11H,2-5H2/t7-,8-/m1/s1 Key: HJSJELVDQOXCHO-HTQZYQBOBU
- SMILES: C1CN2CC=C([C@@H]2[C@@H]1O)CO

Properties
Chemical formula	C_{8}H_{13}NO_{2}
Molar mass	155.197 g·mol^{−1}
Melting point	119 to 120 °C (246 to 248 °F; 392 to 393 K)

Hazards
- Lethal dose or concentration (LD, LC)
LD_{50} (median dose)	634 mg/kg (IV, mouse)
- Except where otherwise noted, data are given for materials in their standard state (at 25 °C [77 °F], 100 kPa). Infobox references

Retronecine is a pyrrolizidine alkaloid found in a variety of plants in the genera Senecio and Crotalaria, and the family Boraginaceae. It is the most common central core for other pyrrolizidine alkaloids.

== See also ==
- Heliotridine, the enantiomer of retronecine
