= Pyrrolizidine =

Names
- Preferred IUPAC name Hexahydro-1H-pyrrolizine
- Other names Hexahydropyrrolizine; 1-Azabicyclo[3.3.0]octane

Identifiers
CAS Number	643-20-9
3D model (JSmol)	Interactive image
ChemSpider	12039
ECHA InfoCard	100.117.254
PubChem CID	12558
UNII	U81KWZ2JKN
CompTox Dashboard (EPA)	DTXSID00214524
- InChI: InChI=1S/C7H13N/c1-3-7-4-2-6-8(7)5-1/h7H,1-6H2 Key: ADRDEXBBJTUCND-UHFFFAOYSA-N; InChI=1/C7H13N/c1-3-7-4-2-6-8(7)5-1/h7H,1-6H2 Key: ADRDEXBBJTUCND-UHFFFAOYAT
- SMILES: N12CCCC1CCC2

Properties
Chemical formula	C_{7}H_{13}N
Molar mass	111.188 g·mol^{−1}
- Except where otherwise noted, data are given for materials in their standard state (at 25 °C [77 °F], 100 kPa). verify (what is ?) Infobox references

Pyrrolizidine is a heterocyclic organic compound. Formally, it is a saturated derivative of pyrrolizine.

Pyrrolizidine forms the central chemical structure of a variety of alkaloids known collectively as pyrrolizidine alkaloids. It is one of five classes of iminosugars. These are often synthesized from a carbohydrate.
