= List of Crotalaria species =

The following species in the flowering plant genus Crotalaria, many of which are called rattlepods or rattleboxes, are recognised by Plants of the World Online:

- Crotalaria abbreviata Baker f.
- Crotalaria abscondita Welw. ex Baker
- Crotalaria acicularis Buch.-Ham. ex Benth.
- Crotalaria aculeata De Wild.
- Crotalaria adamii R.Wilczek
- Crotalaria adamsonii Baker f.
- Crotalaria adariensis D.Subram.
- Crotalaria adenocarpoides Taub.
- Crotalaria adolfi Harms
- Crotalaria aegyptiaca Benth.
- Crotalaria afrocentralis Polhill
- Crotalaria agatiflora Schweinf.
- Crotalaria aiantha Adema
- Crotalaria aidiostipulata Gilli
- Crotalaria alata Buch.-Ham. ex D.Don
- Crotalaria albicaulis Franch.
- Crotalaria albida B.Heyne ex Roth
- Crotalaria alemanniana Torre
- Crotalaria alexandri Baker f.
- Crotalaria allophylla Thulin
- Crotalaria alticola Polhill
- Crotalaria amoena Welw. ex Baker
- Crotalaria andringitrensis R.Vig.
- Crotalaria andromedifolia R.Wilczek
- Crotalaria androyensis R.Vig.
- Crotalaria angulata Mill.
- Crotalaria angulicaulis Harms
- Crotalaria anisophylla (Hiern) Welw. ex Baker f.
- Crotalaria ankaizinensis R.Vig.
- Crotalaria ankaratrana R.Vig.
- Crotalaria annamensis P.Dy Phon
- Crotalaria anningensis X.Y.Zhu & Y.F.Du
- Crotalaria annua Milne-Redh.
- Crotalaria anomala R.Vig.
- Crotalaria anthyllopsis Welw. ex Baker
- Crotalaria antunesii Baker f.
- Crotalaria arcuata Polhill
- Crotalaria arenaria Benth.
- Crotalaria argenteotomentosa R.Wilczek
- Crotalaria argyraea Welw. ex Baker
- Crotalaria argyrolobioides Baker
- Crotalaria aridicola Domin
- Crotalaria arrecta Hemp & Polhill
- Crotalaria arushae Milne-Redh. ex Polhill
- Crotalaria assadii Zaeifi
- Crotalaria assurgens Polhill
- Crotalaria atrorubens Hochst. ex Benth.
- Crotalaria aurea Dinter ex Baker f.
- Crotalaria avonensis DeLaney & Wunderlin
- Crotalaria awasensis Thulin
- Crotalaria axillaris Aiton
- Crotalaria axilliflora Baker f.
- Crotalaria axillifloroides Baker f. ex R.Wilczek
- Crotalaria bahiaensis Windler & S.G.Skinner
- Crotalaria bakeriana Rossberg
- Crotalaria balansae Micheli
- Crotalaria balbi Chiov.
- Crotalaria ballyi Polhill
- Crotalaria bamendae Hepper
- Crotalaria barbata Graham ex Wight & Arn.
- Crotalaria barkae Schweinf.
- Crotalaria barnabassii Dinter ex Baker f.
- Crotalaria basipeta R.Wilczek
- Crotalaria baumii Harms
- Crotalaria becquetii Baker f. ex R.Wilczek
- Crotalaria beddomeana Thoth. & A.A.Ansari
- Crotalaria bemba R.Wilczek
- Crotalaria benadirensis Chiov.
- Crotalaria benguellensis Baker f.
- Crotalaria bequaertii Baker f.
- Crotalaria bernieri Baill.
- Crotalaria berteroana DC.
- Crotalaria bhutanica Thoth.
- Crotalaria bifaria L.f.
- Crotalaria blanda Polhill
- Crotalaria boehmii Taub.
- Crotalaria bogdaniana Polhill
- Crotalaria boliviensis Windler & S.G.Skinner
- Crotalaria bondii Baker f. ex Torre
- Crotalaria bongensis Baker f.
- Crotalaria boranica Harms ex Baker f.
- Crotalaria bosseri M.Peltier
- Crotalaria boudetii Polhill
- Crotalaria boutiqueana R.Wilczek
- Crotalaria brachycarpa Benth.
- Crotalaria bracteata Roxb. ex DC.
- Crotalaria bredoi R.Wilczek
- Crotalaria brevicornuta Polhill
- Crotalaria brevidens Benth.
- Crotalaria breviflora DC.
- Crotalaria brevipedunculata Windler
- Crotalaria brevis Domin
- Crotalaria bupleurifolia Schltdl. & Cham.
- Crotalaria burhia Buch.-Ham. ex Benth.
- Crotalaria burkeana Benth.
- Crotalaria burttii Baker f.
- Crotalaria cabui R.Wilczek
- Crotalaria cajanifolia Kunth
- Crotalaria callensii R.Wilczek
- Crotalaria calliantha Polhill
- Crotalaria calva R.Vig.
- Crotalaria calycina Schrank
- Crotalaria cambodiensis P.Dy Phon
- Crotalaria campestris Polhill
- Crotalaria camptosepala Thulin
- Crotalaria candicans Wight & Arn.
- Crotalaria capensis Jacq.
- Crotalaria capillipes Polhill
- Crotalaria capuronii M.Peltier
- Crotalaria carrissoana Torre
- Crotalaria carsonii Baker f.
- Crotalaria carsonioides R.Wilczek
- Crotalaria caudata Welw. ex Baker
- Crotalaria cephalotes Steud. ex A.Rich.
- Crotalaria chaco-serranensis H.G.Bach & Fortunato
- Crotalaria chamaepeuce Polhill
- Crotalaria chinensis L.
- Crotalaria chirindae Baker f.
- Crotalaria chondrocarpa Polhill
- Crotalaria chrysantha Ahn & S.H.Park
- Crotalaria chrysochlora Baker f. ex Harms
- Crotalaria chrysotricha Polhill
- Crotalaria cistoides Welw. ex Baker
- Crotalaria clarkei Gamble
- Crotalaria claussenii Benth.
- Crotalaria clavata Wight & Arn.
- Crotalaria cleomifolia Welw. ex Baker
- Crotalaria cobalticola P.A.Duvign. & Plancke
- Crotalaria collina Polhill
- Crotalaria colorata Schinz
- Crotalaria comanestiana Volkens & Schweinf.
- Crotalaria comosa Baker
- Crotalaria concinna Polhill
- Crotalaria confertiflora Polhill
- Crotalaria confusa Hepper
- Crotalaria congesta Polhill
- Crotalaria congoensis Baker f.
- Crotalaria cordata Welw. ex Baker
- Crotalaria cornetii Taub. & Dewèvre
- Crotalaria cornu-ammonis R.Vig.
- Crotalaria corymbosa Torre
- Crotalaria coursii Pelt.
- Crotalaria craspedocarpa R.Vig.
- Crotalaria crebra Polhill
- Crotalaria criniramea Baker f. ex Polhill
- Crotalaria crispata F.Muell. ex Benth.
- Crotalaria cunninghamii R.Br.
- Crotalaria cupricola Leteint.
- Crotalaria cuspidata Taub.
- Crotalaria cyanea Baker
- Crotalaria cyanoxantha R.Vig.
- Crotalaria cylindrica A.Rich.
- Crotalaria cylindrocarpa DC.
- Crotalaria cylindrostachys Welw. ex Baker
- Crotalaria cytisoides Roxb. ex DC.
- Crotalaria dalensis Torre
- Crotalaria damarensis Engl.
- Crotalaria dasyclada Polhill
- Crotalaria debilis Polhill
- Crotalaria decaryana R.Vig.
- Crotalaria decora Polhill
- Crotalaria dedzana Polhill
- Crotalaria deflersii Schweinf.
- Crotalaria deightonii Hepper
- Crotalaria densicephala Welw. ex Baker
- Crotalaria depressa Polhill
- Crotalaria desaegeri R.Wilczek
- Crotalaria descampsii Micheli
- Crotalaria deserticola Taub. ex Baker f.
- Crotalaria dewildemaniana R.Wilczek
- Crotalaria digitata Hook.
- Crotalaria dilatata Polhill
- Crotalaria diminuta Polhill
- Crotalaria dinteri Schinz
- Crotalaria diosmifolia Benth.
- Crotalaria dissitiflora Benth.
- Crotalaria distans Benth.
- Crotalaria distantiflora Baker f.
- Crotalaria doidgeae I.Verd.
- Crotalaria dolichantha Polhill
- Crotalaria dolichonyx Baker f. & W.Martin
- Crotalaria doniana Baker
- Crotalaria dubia Graham ex Benth.
- Crotalaria duboisii R.Wilczek
- Crotalaria dumosa Franch.
- Crotalaria dura J.M.Wood & M.S.Evans
- Crotalaria durandiana R.Wilczek
- Crotalaria duvigneaudii Timp.
- Crotalaria ebenoides (Guill. & Perr.) Walp.
- Crotalaria edmundi-bakeri R.Vig.
- Crotalaria egregia Polhill
- Crotalaria elizabethae Baker f.
- Crotalaria emarginata Bojer ex Benth.
- Crotalaria emarginella Vatke
- Crotalaria emirnensis Benth.
- Crotalaria ephemera Polhill
- Crotalaria epunctata Dalzell
- Crotalaria eremaea F.Muell.
- Crotalaria eremicola Baker f.
- Crotalaria ericoides Torre
- Crotalaria eriocarpa Benth.
- Crotalaria erythrophleba Welw. ex Baker
- Crotalaria eurycalyx Polhill
- Crotalaria evolvuloides Wight
- Crotalaria exaltata Polhill
- Crotalaria excisa (Thunb.) Baker f.
- Crotalaria exelliana R.Wilczek
- Crotalaria exilipes Polhill
- Crotalaria exilis Polhill
- Crotalaria eximia Polhill
- Crotalaria fallax Chiov.
- Crotalaria fascicularis Polhill
- Crotalaria fenarolii Torre
- Crotalaria fiherenensis R.Vig.
- Crotalaria filicaulis Welw. ex Baker
- Crotalaria filifolia Rose
- Crotalaria filiformis Wall. ex Benth.
- Crotalaria filipes Benth.
- Crotalaria flavicarinata Baker f.
- Crotalaria flavicoma Benth.
- Crotalaria florida Welw. ex Baker
- Crotalaria formosa Graham ex Wight & Arn.
- Crotalaria friesii I.Verd.
- Crotalaria fysonii Dunn
- Crotalaria gamwelliae Baker f.
- Crotalaria gazensis Baker f.
- Crotalaria germainii R.Wilczek
- Crotalaria giessii M.M.le Roux & B.-E.van Wyk
- Crotalaria gillettii Polhill
- Crotalaria glabripedicellata R.Wilczek
- Crotalaria glauca Willd.
- Crotalaria glaucifolia Baker
- Crotalaria glaucoides Baker f.
- Crotalaria globifera E.Mey.
- Crotalaria globosa Wight & Arn.
- Crotalaria gloriae Bernal
- Crotalaria gnidioides R.Wilczek
- Crotalaria goetzei Harms
- Crotalaria goiasensis Windler & S.G.Skinner
- Crotalaria goodiiformis Vatke
- Crotalaria goreensis Guill. & Perr.
- Crotalaria gracilipes O.Lachenaud
- Crotalaria grahamiana Wight & Arn.
- Crotalaria graminicola Taub. ex Baker f.
- Crotalaria grandibracteata Taub.
- Crotalaria grandiflora Benth.
- Crotalaria grandistipulata Harms
- Crotalaria grata Polhill
- Crotalaria greenwayi Baker f.
- Crotalaria grevei Drake
- Crotalaria griquensis Bolus
- Crotalaria griseofusca Baker f.
- Crotalaria hainanensis R.F.Huang
- Crotalaria handelii E.Peter
- Crotalaria harleyi Windler & S.G.Skinner
- Crotalaria haumaniana R.Wilczek
- Crotalaria hebecarpa (DC.) Rudd
- Crotalaria heidmannii Schinz
- Crotalaria hemsleyi Milne-Redh.
- Crotalaria herpetoclada Rossberg
- Crotalaria heterotricha Polhill
- Crotalaria heyneana Graham ex Wight & Arn.
- Crotalaria hilariana Benth.
- Crotalaria hirsuta Willd.
- Crotalaria hirta Willd.
- Crotalaria hoffmannii R.Wilczek
- Crotalaria holoptera Welw. ex Baker
- Crotalaria holosericea Nees & Mart.
- Crotalaria horrida Polhill
- Crotalaria huillensis Taub.
- Crotalaria humbertiana M.Peltier
- Crotalaria humbertii R.Vig.
- Crotalaria humifusa Graham ex Benth.
- Crotalaria humilis Eckl. & Zeyh.
- Crotalaria hypargyrea Chiov.
- Crotalaria hyssopifolia Klotzsch
- Crotalaria ibityensis R.Vig. & Humbert
- Crotalaria impressa Nees ex Walp.
- Crotalaria incana L.
- Crotalaria incompta N.E.Br.
- Crotalaria incrassifolia Polhill
- Crotalaria inequalis A.E.Holland
- Crotalaria inflexa Polhill
- Crotalaria inopinata (Harms) Polhill
- Crotalaria insignis Polhill
- Crotalaria intonsa Polhill
- Crotalaria intricata Thulin
- Crotalaria involutifolia Polhill
- Crotalaria inyangensis Polhill
- Crotalaria ionoptera Polhill
- Crotalaria iringana Harms
- Crotalaria irwinii Windler & S.G.Skinner
- Crotalaria isaloensis R.Vig.
- Crotalaria ivantulensis Welw. ex Baker
- Crotalaria jacksonii Baker f.
- Crotalaria jerokoensis Baker f.
- Crotalaria jianfengensis C.Y.Yang
- Crotalaria jijigensis Thulin
- Crotalaria johannis Torre
- Crotalaria johnstonii Baker
- Crotalaria jubae Polhill
- Crotalaria juncea L.
- Crotalaria jurioniana R.Wilczek
- Crotalaria kambanguensis R.Wilczek
- Crotalaria kambolensis Baker f.
- Crotalaria kanaii H.Ohashi
- Crotalaria kanchiana Gholave, Mane, Gore, Kambale & S.P.Gaikwad
- Crotalaria kandoensis Baker f.
- Crotalaria kapiriensis De Wild.
- Crotalaria karagwensis Taub.
- Crotalaria kassneri Baker f.
- Crotalaria kelaensis Baker f.
- Crotalaria keniensis Baker f.
- Crotalaria kerkvoordei R.Wilczek
- Crotalaria khasiana Balansa ex Thoth. & A.A.Ansari
- Crotalaria kibaraensis R.Wilczek
- Crotalaria kipandensis Baker f.
- Crotalaria kipilaensis R.Wilczek
- Crotalaria kirkii Baker
- Crotalaria kodaiensis Debb. & Biswas
- Crotalaria kolbergii M.M.le Roux & B.-E.van Wyk
- Crotalaria kostermansii Niyomdham
- Crotalaria kuiririensis Baker f.
- Crotalaria kundelunguensis Baker f.
- Crotalaria kurtii Schinz
- Crotalaria kurzii Baker ex Kurz
- Crotalaria kwengeensis R.Wilczek
- Crotalaria laburnifolia L.
- Crotalaria laburnoides Klotzsch
- Crotalaria lachnocarpoides Engl.
- Crotalaria lachnophora A.Rich.
- Crotalaria lachnosema Stapf
- Crotalaria laeta Mart. ex Benth.
- Crotalaria laevigata Lam.
- Crotalaria lanceolata E.Mey.
- Crotalaria lancifoliolata Torre
- Crotalaria larsenii Niyomdham
- Crotalaria lasiocarpa Polhill
- Crotalaria lathyroides Guill. & Perr.
- Crotalaria lawalreeana R.Wilczek
- Crotalaria laxiflora Baker
- Crotalaria leandriana M.Peltier
- Crotalaria lebeckioides Bond
- Crotalaria lebrunii Baker f.
- Crotalaria ledermannii Baker f.
- Crotalaria lejoloba Bartl.
- Crotalaria leonardiana Timp.
- Crotalaria lepidissima Baker f.
- Crotalaria leprieurii Guill. & Perr.
- Crotalaria leptocarpa Balf.f.
- Crotalaria leptoclada Harms
- Crotalaria leptostachya Benth.
- Crotalaria leschenaultii DC.
- Crotalaria leubnitziana Schinz
- Crotalaria leucoclada Baker
- Crotalaria lidiae Ram.-Hern. & Cruz Durán
- Crotalaria limosa Polhill
- Crotalaria linearifoliolata Chiov.
- Crotalaria linifolia L.f.
- Crotalaria lisowskii Polhill
- Crotalaria loandae Baker f.
- Crotalaria longiclavata Polhill
- Crotalaria longidens Burtt Davy ex I.Verd.
- Crotalaria longipes Wight & Arn.
- Crotalaria longirostrata Hook. & Arn.
- Crotalaria longithyrsa Baker f.
- Crotalaria lotifolia L.
- Crotalaria lotiformis Milne-Redh.
- Crotalaria lotoides Benth.
- Crotalaria lukafuensis De Wild.
- Crotalaria lukomae Baker f.
- Crotalaria lukwangulensis Harms
- Crotalaria lundensis Torre
- Crotalaria lunulata B.Heyne ex Wight & Arn.
- Crotalaria luondeensis R.Wilczek
- Crotalaria lusamboensis R.Wilczek
- Crotalaria lusingaensis R.Wilczek
- Crotalaria lutescens Dalzell
- Crotalaria luxenii Baker f.
- Crotalaria luzoniensis Adema
- Crotalaria macrantha Polhill
- Crotalaria macrocalyx Benth.
- Crotalaria macrocarpa E.Mey.
- Crotalaria madurensis Wight & Arn.
- Crotalaria magaliesbergensis A.S.Flores & Sch.Rodr.
- Crotalaria mahafalensis R.Vig.
- Crotalaria mairei H.Lév.
- Crotalaria malaissei Polhill
- Crotalaria malindiensis Polhill
- Crotalaria mandrarensis R.Vig.
- Crotalaria manganifera Polhill
- Crotalaria manongarivensis R.Vig.
- Crotalaria martiana Benth.
- Crotalaria massaiensis Taub.
- Crotalaria mauensis Baker f.
- Crotalaria maypurensis Kunth
- Crotalaria medicaginea Lam.
- Crotalaria meeboldii Dunn
- Crotalaria meghalayensis Danda & A.K.Pandey
- Crotalaria melanocalyx Polhill
- Crotalaria melanocarpa Wall. ex Benth.
- Crotalaria mendesii Torre
- Crotalaria mendoncae Torre
- Crotalaria mentiens Polhill
- Crotalaria mesopontica Taub.
- Crotalaria mexicana Windler
- Crotalaria meyeriana Steud.
- Crotalaria micans Link
- Crotalaria micheliana R.Wilczek
- Crotalaria micrantha Link
- Crotalaria microcarpa Hochst. ex Benth.
- Crotalaria microphylla Vahl
- Crotalaria microthamnus Robyns ex R.Wilczek
- Crotalaria mildbraedii Baker f.
- Crotalaria milneana R.Wilczek
- Crotalaria minutissima Baker f.
- Crotalaria miottoae A.S.Flores & A.M.G.Azevedo
- Crotalaria miranda Milne-Redh.
- Crotalaria misella Polhill
- Crotalaria mitchellii Benth.
- Crotalaria mocubensis Polhill
- Crotalaria modesta Polhill
- Crotalaria mollicula Kunth
- Crotalaria mollii Polhill
- Crotalaria monophylla Germish.
- Crotalaria montana Roxb. ex Roth
- Crotalaria monteiroi Taub. ex Baker f.
- Crotalaria mortonii Hepper
- Crotalaria morumbensis Baker f.
- Crotalaria mudugensis Thulin
- Crotalaria muenzneri Baker f.
- Crotalaria multibracteata S.A.Rather & A.K.Pandey
- Crotalaria multiflora (Arn.) Benth.
- Crotalaria mwangulangoi Gereau & Bodine
- Crotalaria mysorensis Roth
- Crotalaria namuliensis Polhill & T.Harris
- Crotalaria nana Burm.f.
- Crotalaria naragutensis Hutch.
- Crotalaria natalensis Baker f.
- Crotalaria natalitia Meisn.
- Crotalaria nayaritensis Windler
- Crotalaria nematophylla Baker f.
- Crotalaria neriifolia Wall. ex Benth.
- Crotalaria newtoniana Torre
- Crotalaria nigricans Baker
- Crotalaria nitens Kunth
- Crotalaria notonii Wight & Arn.
- Crotalaria novae-hollandiae DC.
- Crotalaria nuda Polhill
- Crotalaria nudiflora Polhill
- Crotalaria nyikensis Baker
- Crotalaria obscura DC.
- Crotalaria obtecta Graham ex Wight & Arn.
- Crotalaria occidentalis Hepper
- Crotalaria occulta Graham ex Benth.
- Crotalaria ochroleuca G.Don
- Crotalaria oligosperma Polhill
- Crotalaria oligostachya Baker
- Crotalaria onobrychis A.Rich.
- Crotalaria ononoides Benth.
- Crotalaria onusta Polhill
- Crotalaria oocarpa Baker
- Crotalaria orientalis Burtt Davy ex I.Verd.
- Crotalaria orixensis Rottler ex Willd.
- Crotalaria orthoclada Welw. ex Baker
- Crotalaria otoptera Benth.
- Crotalaria ovata Polhill
- Crotalaria oxyphylla Harms
- Crotalaria oxyphylloides R.Wilczek
- Crotalaria pallida Aiton
- Crotalaria pallidicaulis Harms
- Crotalaria paniculata Willd.
- Crotalaria paracistoides Torre
- Crotalaria paraspartea Polhill
- Crotalaria parvula Welw. ex Baker
- Crotalaria passerinoides Taub.
- Crotalaria patula Polhill
- Crotalaria paulina Schrank
- Crotalaria pearsonii Baker f.
- Crotalaria peduncularis Graham ex Wight & Arn.
- Crotalaria pellita Bertero ex DC.
- Crotalaria peltieri Polhill
- Crotalaria pentaphylla Baker f.
- Crotalaria perbracteolata Polhill
- Crotalaria peregrina Polhill
- Crotalaria perlaxa Polhill
- Crotalaria perpusilla Collett & Hemsl.
- Crotalaria perrieri R.Vig.
- Crotalaria perrottetii DC.
- Crotalaria persica (Burm.f.) Merr.
- Crotalaria pervillei Baill.
- Crotalaria peschiana J.Duvign. & Timp.
- Crotalaria petiolata Vogel ex Walp.
- Crotalaria petitiana (A.Rich.) Walp.
- Crotalaria phillipsiae Baker
- Crotalaria phylicoides Wild
- Crotalaria phylloloba Harms
- Crotalaria phyllostachya Gagnep.
- Crotalaria phyllostachys Baker
- Crotalaria pilosa Mill.
- Crotalaria pilosiflora Baker
- Crotalaria pisicarpa Welw. ex Baker
- Crotalaria pittardiana Torre
- Crotalaria platysepala Harv.
- Crotalaria pleiophylla Polhill
- Crotalaria plowdenii Baker
- Crotalaria podocarpa DC.
- Crotalaria poecilantha Polhill
- Crotalaria poissonii R.Vig.
- Crotalaria polhillii Thulin
- Crotalaria poliochlora Harms
- Crotalaria polyantha Taub.
- Crotalaria polychroma Polhill
- Crotalaria polygaloides Welw. ex Baker
- Crotalaria polyphylla L.Riley
- Crotalaria polysperma Kotschy
- Crotalaria polytricha Polhill
- Crotalaria praetexta Polhill
- Crotalaria preladoi Baker f.
- Crotalaria priestleyoides Benth.
- Crotalaria prittwitzii Baker f.
- Crotalaria prolongata Baker
- Crotalaria prostrata Rottler ex Willd.
- Crotalaria protensa Welw. ex Baker
- Crotalaria psammophila Harms
- Crotalaria pseudoalexanderi R.Wilczek
- Crotalaria pseudodiloloensis R.Wilczek
- Crotalaria pseudoquangensis Torre
- Crotalaria pseudoseretii R.Wilczek
- Crotalaria pseudospartium Baker f.
- Crotalaria pseudotenuirama Torre
- Crotalaria pseudovirgultalis Torre
- Crotalaria pterocalyx Harms
- Crotalaria pteropoda Balf.f.
- Crotalaria pterospartioides Torre
- Crotalaria pudica Polhill
- Crotalaria pulchra Andrews
- Crotalaria pumila Ortega
- Crotalaria purdieana Senn
- Crotalaria purshii DC.
- Crotalaria pusilla Roxb. ex Roth
- Crotalaria pycnostachya Benth.
- Crotalaria pygmaea Polhill
- Crotalaria quangensis Taub.
- Crotalaria quarrei Baker f.
- Crotalaria quartiniana A.Rich.
- Crotalaria quercetorum Brandegee
- Crotalaria quinquefolia L.
- Crotalaria reclinata Polhill
- Crotalaria recta Steud. ex A.Rich.
- Crotalaria recumbens Polhill
- Crotalaria renieriana R.Wilczek
- Crotalaria reptans Taub.
- Crotalaria retusa L.
- Crotalaria rhizoclada Polhill
- Crotalaria rhodesiae Baker f.
- Crotalaria rhynchocarpa Polhill
- Crotalaria rhynchotropioides Baker f.
- Crotalaria rigida B.Heyne ex Roth
- Crotalaria ringoetii Baker f.
- Crotalaria riparia Polhill
- Crotalaria rogersii Baker f.
- Crotalaria rosenii (Pax) Milne-Redh. ex Polhill
- Crotalaria rotundifolia J.F.Gmel.
- Crotalaria rubiginosa Willd.
- Crotalaria rufipila Benth.
- Crotalaria rufocaulis Gilli
- Crotalaria rupicola Baker f.
- Crotalaria ruspoliana Chiov.
- Crotalaria rzedowskii J.Espinosa
- Crotalaria sacculata Chiov.
- Crotalaria sagittalis L.
- Crotalaria saharae Coss.
- Crotalaria salicifolia B.Heyne ex Wight & Arn.
- Crotalaria saltiana Andrews
- Crotalaria sandoorensis Bedd. ex Gamble
- Crotalaria sapinii De Wild.
- Crotalaria scabra Gamble
- Crotalaria scabrella Wight & Arn.
- Crotalaria scassellatii Chiov.
- Crotalaria schiedeana Steud.
- Crotalaria schinzii Baker f.
- Crotalaria schlechteri Baker f.
- Crotalaria schliebenii Polhill
- Crotalaria schmitzii R.Wilczek
- Crotalaria schweinfurthii Deflers
- Crotalaria seemeniana Harms
- Crotalaria semperflorens Vent.
- Crotalaria senegalensis (Pers.) Bacle ex DC.
- Crotalaria sengensis Baker f.
- Crotalaria serengetiana Polhill
- Crotalaria sericea Burm.f.
- Crotalaria sericifolia Harms
- Crotalaria serpentinicola Leteint. & Polhill
- Crotalaria sertulifera Taub.
- Crotalaria sessiliflora L.
- Crotalaria sessilis De Wild.
- Crotalaria shanica Lace
- Crotalaria shevaroyensis Gamble
- Crotalaria shirensis (Baker f.) Milne-Redh.
- Crotalaria shrirangiana K.H.Rokade, Dalavi, S.S.Gaikwad & N.B.Gaikwad
- Crotalaria shuklae A.P.Tiwari & A.A.Ansari
- Crotalaria similis Hemsl.
- Crotalaria simoma Polhill
- Crotalaria simulans Milne-Redh.
- Crotalaria singulifloroides R.Wilczek
- Crotalaria smithiana A.T.Lee
- Crotalaria socotrana (Balf.f.) Thulin
- Crotalaria somalensis Chiov.
- Crotalaria sonorensis Standl.
- Crotalaria sparsifolia Baker
- Crotalaria spartea R.Br. ex Baker
- Crotalaria spartioides DC.
- Crotalaria spathulatofoliolata Torre
- Crotalaria speciosa B.Heyne ex Roth
- Crotalaria spectabilis Roth
- Crotalaria sphaerocarpa Perr. ex DC.
- Crotalaria spinosa Hochst. ex Benth.
- Crotalaria squamigera Deflers
- Crotalaria staneriana Baker f.
- Crotalaria stenopoda Baker f.
- Crotalaria stenoptera Welw. ex Baker
- Crotalaria stenorhampha Harms
- Crotalaria stenothyrsa Taub.
- Crotalaria steudneri Schweinf.
- Crotalaria stipitata Graham ex Wight & Arn.
- Crotalaria stipularia Desv.
- Crotalaria stocksii Benth. ex Baker
- Crotalaria stolzii (Baker f.) Milne-Redh. ex Polhill
- Crotalaria streptorrhyncha Milne-Redh.
- Crotalaria strigulosa Balf.f.
- Crotalaria stuhlmannii Taub.
- Crotalaria subcaespitosa Polhill
- Crotalaria subcalvata Polhill
- Crotalaria subcapitata De Wild.
- Crotalaria subdecurrens Mart. ex Benth.
- Crotalaria subperfoliata Wight
- Crotalaria subsessilis Harms
- Crotalaria subspicata Polhill
- Crotalaria subtilis Polhill
- Crotalaria suffruticosa S.Subraman. & A.K.Pandey
- Crotalaria sulphizii Thoth. & A.A.Ansari
- Crotalaria sylvicola Baker f.
- Crotalaria szaferiana R.Wilczek
- Crotalaria tabularis Baker f.
- Crotalaria tamboensis R.Wilczek
- Crotalaria tanety Du Puy, Labat & H.Ireland
- Crotalaria tchibangensis Maesen
- Crotalaria teixeirae Torre
- Crotalaria tenuipedicellata Baker f.
- Crotalaria tenuirama Welw. ex Baker
- Crotalaria tenuirostrata Polhill
- Crotalaria teretifolia Milne-Redh.
- Crotalaria tetragona Roxb. ex Andrews
- Crotalaria tetraptera Torre
- Crotalaria thaumasiophylla Harms
- Crotalaria thebaica (Delile) DC.
- Crotalaria thomasii Harms
- Crotalaria tiantaiensis Yan C.Jiang, X.Y.Zhu, Y.F.Du & H.Ohashi
- Crotalaria toamasinae M.Peltier
- Crotalaria torrei Polhill
- Crotalaria trichotoma Bojer
- Crotalaria trifoliastrum Willd.
- Crotalaria trifoliolata Baker f.
- Crotalaria trinervia Polhill
- Crotalaria triquetra Dalzell
- Crotalaria tristis Polhill
- Crotalaria tsavoana Polhill
- Crotalaria tweedieana Benth.
- Crotalaria ubonensis P.Dy Phon
- Crotalaria uguenensis Taub.
- Crotalaria ukambensis Vatke
- Crotalaria ukingensis Harms
- Crotalaria ulbrichiana Harms
- Crotalaria uliginosa R.F.Huang
- Crotalaria umbellifera R.E.Fr.
- Crotalaria uncinata Welw. ex Baker
- Crotalaria uncinella Lam.
- Crotalaria unicaulis Bullock
- Crotalaria unifoliolata Benth.
- Crotalaria vagans Polhill
- Crotalaria valetonii Backer
- Crotalaria valida Baker
- Crotalaria vallicola Baker f.
- Crotalaria vandenbrandii R.Wilczek
- Crotalaria vanderystii R.Wilczek
- Crotalaria vanmeelii R.Wilczek
- Crotalaria varians Craib
- Crotalaria varicosa Polhill
- Crotalaria variifolia Polhill
- Crotalaria vasculosa Wall. ex Benth.
- Crotalaria vatkeana Engl.
- Crotalaria velutina Benth.
- Crotalaria verdcourtii Polhill
- Crotalaria verrucosa L.
- Crotalaria vespertilio Benth.
- Crotalaria vestita Baker
- Crotalaria vialattei Batt.
- Crotalaria vialis Milne-Redh.
- Crotalaria virgulata Klotzsch
- Crotalaria virgultalis Burch. ex DC.
- Crotalaria vitellina Ker Gawl.
- Crotalaria walkeri Arn.
- Crotalaria warfae Thulin
- Crotalaria welwitschii Baker
- Crotalaria wightiana Graham ex Wight & Arn.
- Crotalaria wilczekiana Timp.
- Crotalaria willdenowiana DC.
- Crotalaria xanthoclada Bojer ex Benth.
- Crotalaria yaihsienensis T.C.Chen
- Crotalaria youngii Baker f.
- Crotalaria yunnanensis Franch.
