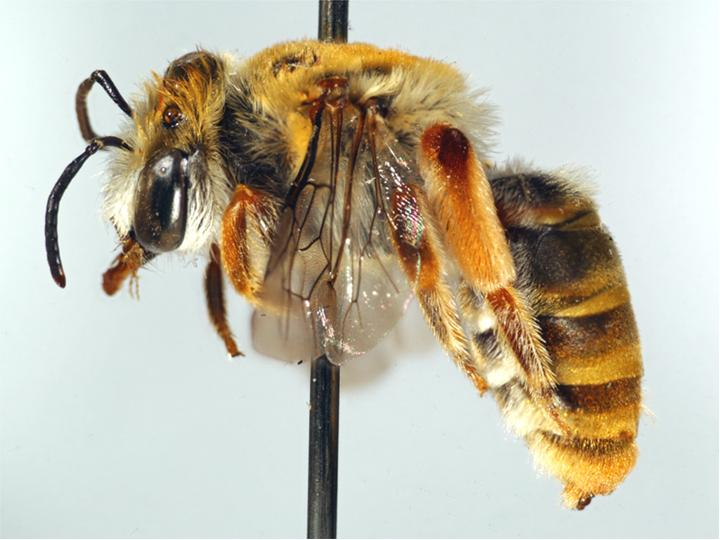
- Female

Scientific classification
- Kingdom: Animalia
- Phylum: Arthropoda
- Clade: Pancrustacea
- Class: Insecta
- Order: Hymenoptera
- Family: Colletidae
- Genus: Trichocolletes
- Species: T. centralis

Binomial name
- Trichocolletes centralis Batley & Houston, 2012

= Trichocolletes centralis =

Species of bee

Trichocolletes centralis is a species of bee in the family Colletidae and the subfamily Colletinae. It is endemic to Australia. It was described in 2012 by Australian entomologists Michael Batley and Terry Houston.

== Etymology ==
The specific epithet centralis (Latin: 'central') refers to the region where the species is found.

== Description ==
The body length is about 11–13 mm. The eyes are not hairy. Colouration is mainly black and dark brown to orange-brown, with broad gold metasomal bands, and with brown and orange hair. There is also a paler form with silver metasomal bands and paler hair.

== Distribution and habitat ==
The species occurs in arid central Australia. The type locality is 30 km west of Sandstone, Western Australia.

== Behaviour ==
The adults are flying mellivores. Flowering plants visited by the bees include Crotalaria eremaea, Kennedia prorepens, Aluta maisonneuvei, Gompholobium polyzygum, Dicrastylis brunnea, Enekbatus stowardii, Ptilotus obovatus and Mirbelia ramulosa, as well as Goodenia, Helipterum and Swainsona species.

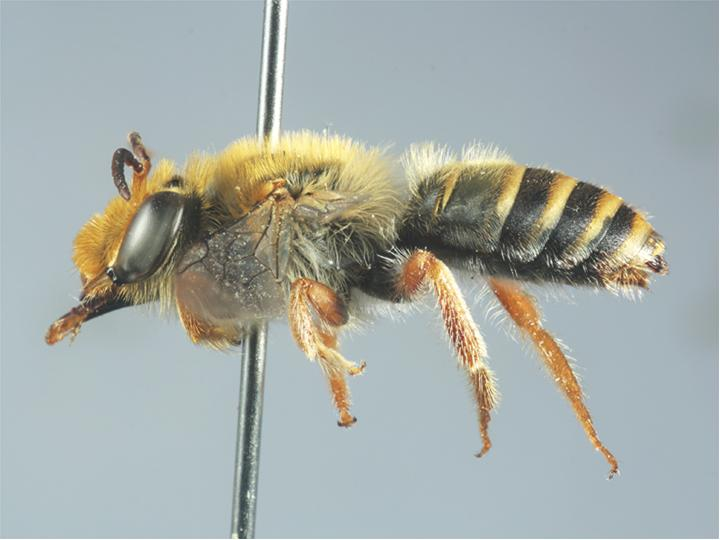
Male

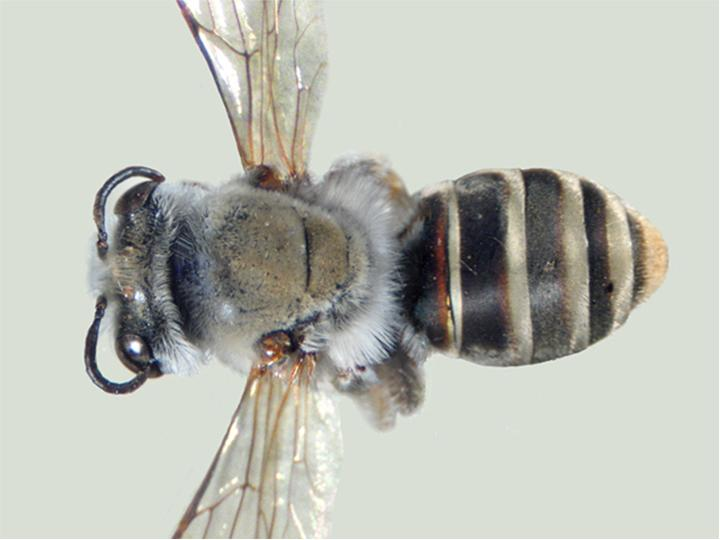
Dorsal view of paler form, female
