= Hydroxymethylglutaryl-CoA hydrolase =

Class of enzymes

Identifiers
- EC no.: 3.1.2.5
- CAS no.: 9025-89-2

Databases
- BRENDA: enzyme data
- ExPASy: NiceZyme view
- KEGG: enzyme entry
- MetaCyc: metabolic pathway
- Rhea: reactions
- PDB structures: RCSB PDB PDBe PDBsum
- Gene Ontology: AmiGO / QuickGO
Search
- PMC: articles
- PubMed: articles
- NCBI: proteins

The enzyme hydroxymethylglutaryl-CoA hydrolase (EC 3.1.2.5) catalyzes the reaction

(S)-3-Hydroxy-3-
methylglutaryl-CoA
H_{2}O
coenzyme A
+
meglutol

The enzyme characterised from liver hydrolyses (S)-3-Hydroxy-3-
methylglutaryl-CoA to coenzyme A and the acid, meglutol, which forms the thioester in the starting material. The reaction is part of leucine metabolism.. The enzyme may be important in the regulation of cholesterol biosynthesis in mammals.

This enzyme is a hydrolase, specifically one acting on thioester bonds. The systematic name is S-(2-hydroxyacyl)glutathione hydrolase. Other names in common use include β-hydroxy-beta-methylglutaryl coenzyme A hydrolase, β-hydroxy-β-methylglutaryl coenzyme A deacylase, hydroxymethylglutaryl coenzyme A hydrolase, hydroxymethylglutaryl coenzyme A deacylase, and 3-hydroxy-3-methylglutaryl-CoA hydrolase.
