= Leioproctus conjunctus =

Scientific classification
- Kingdom: Animalia
- Phylum: Arthropoda
- Clade: Pancrustacea
- Class: Insecta
- Order: Hymenoptera
- Family: Colletidae
- Genus: Leioproctus
- Species: L. conjunctus

Binomial name
- Leioproctus conjunctus Batley, 2025

Species of bee

Leioproctus conjunctus, or Leioproctus (Euryglossidia) conjunctus, is a species of bee in the family Colletidae and subfamily Colletinae. It is endemic to Australia. It was described by entomologist Michael Batley in 2025.

== Etymology ==
The specific epithet conjunctus (Latin: "adjoining") is an anatomical reference to the forewing venation.

== Description ==
The male body length is 5.2 mm. Integumental colouration is mainly black, with a faint brassy sheen and dark brown to yellow-brown markings. The hair is white.

== Distribution and habitat ==
The species occurs in inland Western Australia. The type locality is 83 km west-north-west of Wiluna.

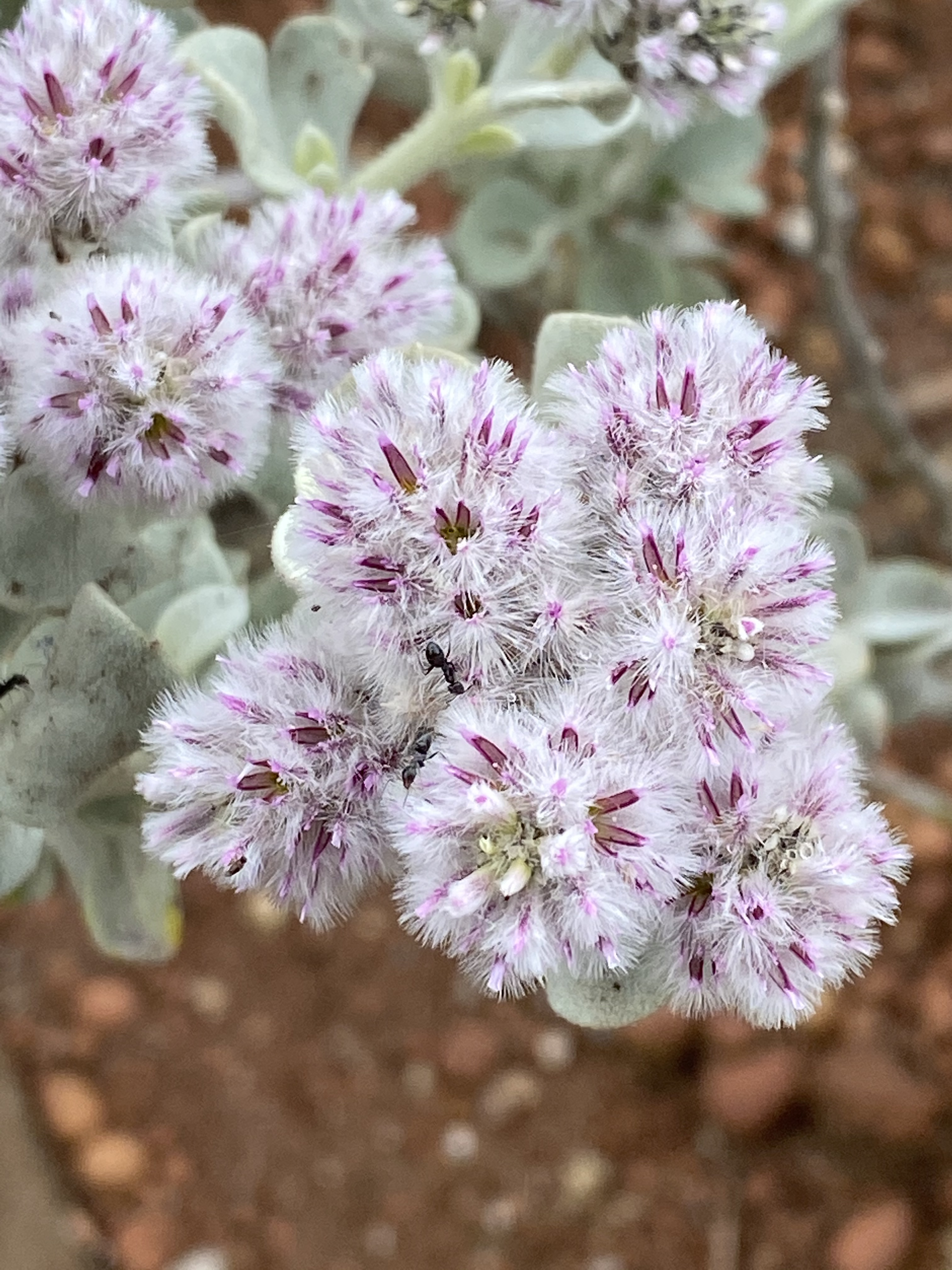
Flowers of Ptilotus obovatus

== Behaviour ==
The adults are flying mellivores. Flowering plants visited by the bees include Ptilotus obovatus.

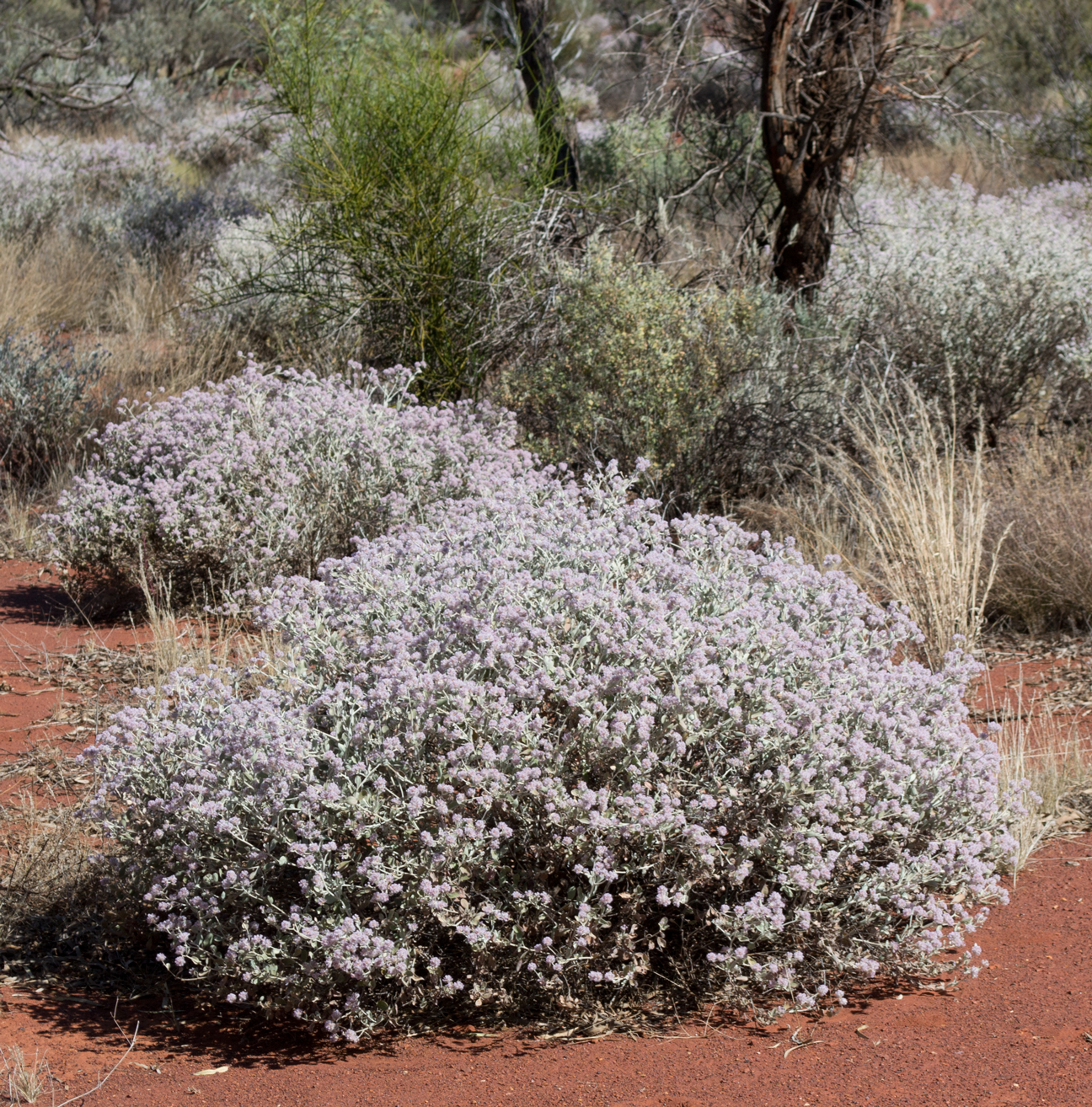
Ptilotus obovatus (smoke bush), a forage plant of the bees
