= Enekbatus eremaeus =

Scientific classification
- Kingdom: Plantae
- Clade: Tracheophytes
- Clade: Angiosperms
- Clade: Eudicots
- Clade: Rosids
- Order: Myrtales
- Family: Myrtaceae
- Genus: Enekbatus
- Species: E. eremaeus

Binomial name
- Enekbatus eremaeus Trudgen & Rye

Species of flowering plant

Enekbatus eremaeus is a shrub endemic to Western Australia.

The low, bushy and erect shrub typically grows to a height of 0.3 to 1.0 metre (1 to 3 ft). It blooms between April and October producing white-pink-purple flowers.

It is found on breakaways, flats, hills and rises in the Mid West and Goldfields-Esperance regions of Western Australia between Wiluna and Kalgoorlie where it grows in sandy-loamy soils.
