= Enekbatus dualis =

Conservation status
- Priority One — Poorly Known Taxa (DEC)

Scientific classification
- Kingdom: Plantae
- Clade: Tracheophytes
- Clade: Angiosperms
- Clade: Eudicots
- Clade: Rosids
- Order: Myrtales
- Family: Myrtaceae
- Genus: Enekbatus
- Species: E. dualis

Binomial name
- Enekbatus dualis Trudgen & Rye

Species of flowering plant

Enekbatus dualis is a shrub endemic to Western Australia.

== Description ==
The shrub typically grows to a height of 0.75 metres (2 ft). It blooms in September producing pink flowers.

== Distribution ==
It is found on low hills and slopes and among rocky outcrops in the Mid West region of Western Australia between Geraldton and Yalgoo, where it grows in sandy clay soils over granite.
