= Enekbatus planifolius =

Conservation status
- Priority One — Poorly Known Taxa (DEC)

Scientific classification
- Kingdom: Plantae
- Clade: Tracheophytes
- Clade: Angiosperms
- Clade: Eudicots
- Clade: Rosids
- Order: Myrtales
- Family: Myrtaceae
- Genus: Enekbatus
- Species: E. planifolius

Binomial name
- Enekbatus planifolius Trudgen & Rye

Species of flowering plant

Enekbatus planifolius is a shrub endemic to Western Australia.

The spreading shrub typically grows to a height of 1.1 metres (4 ft). It blooms between September and October producing pink flowers.

It is found on gentle slopes in the Mid West region of Western Australia around Morawa where it grows in sandy-silty soils.
