= Meglutol =

Chemical compound

Clinical data
- ATC code: C10AX05 (WHO)

Identifiers
- IUPAC name: 3-hydroxy-3-methylpentanedioic acid
- CAS Number: 503-49-1
- PubChem CID: 1662
- DrugBank: DB04377
- ChemSpider: 1600
- UNII: CLA99KCD53
- KEGG: D04897
- ChEBI: CHEBI:16831
- ChEMBL: ChEMBL50444
- CompTox Dashboard (EPA): DTXSID90198304
- ECHA InfoCard: 100.007.247

Chemical and physical data
- Formula: C_{6}H_{10}O_{5}
- Molar mass: 162.141 g·mol^{−1}
- 3D model (JSmol): Interactive image
- SMILES: O=C(O)CC(O)(C)CC(=O)O
- InChI: InChI=1S/C6H10O5/c1-6(11,2-4(7)8)3-5(9)10/h11H,2-3H2,1H3,(H,7,8)(H,9,10); Key:NPOAOTPXWNWTSH-UHFFFAOYSA-N

Meglutol (INN, also known as 3-hydroxy-3-methylglutaric acid, β-hydroxy-β-methylglutaric acid, and dicrotalic acid) is a hypolipidemic agent.

It occurs free in Crotalaria dura and C. globifera and is bound in dicrotaline (pyrrolizidine alkaloid).

== See also ==
- Crotalaria
  - List of Crotalaria species
- Mevalonic acid
