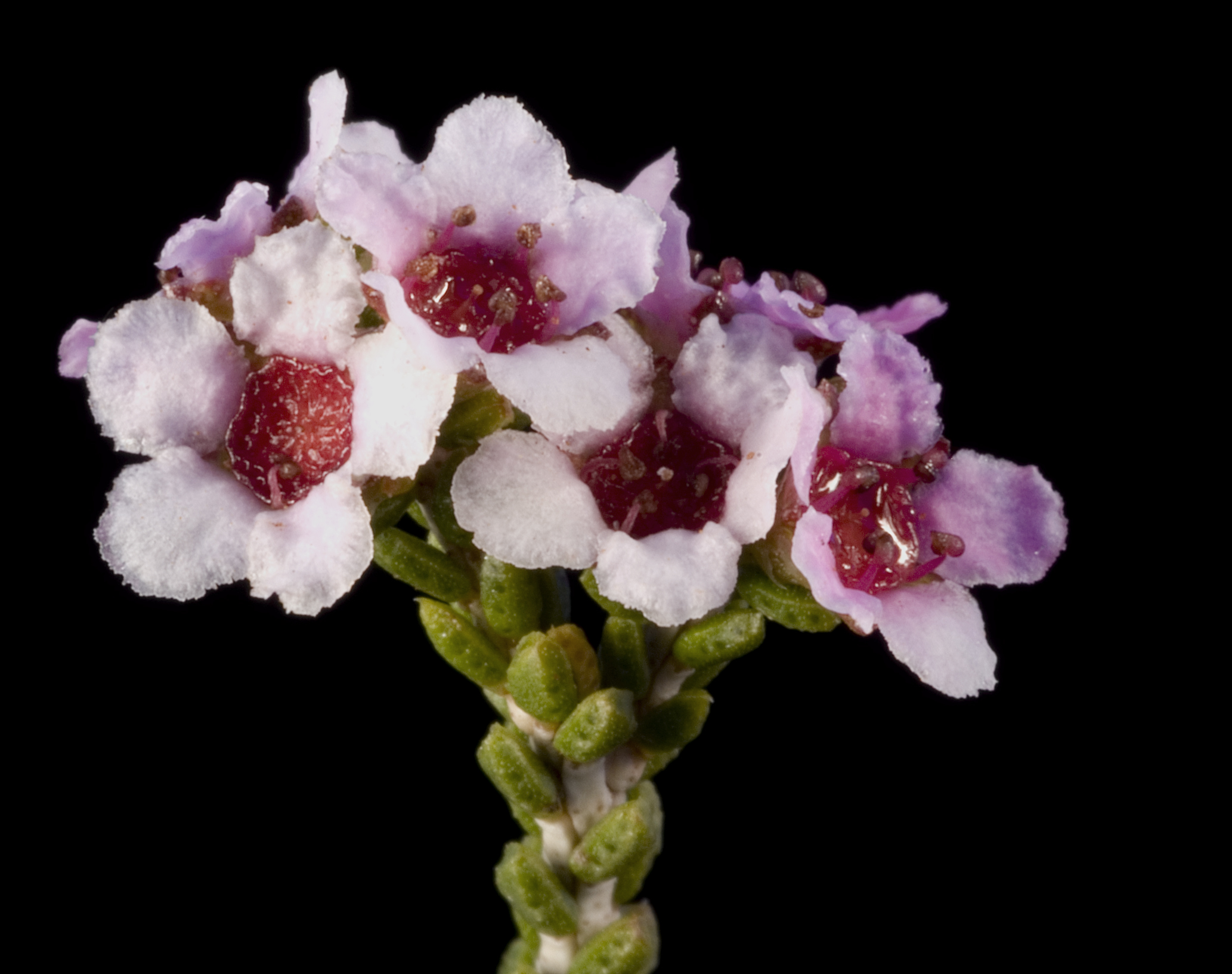
- Aluta maisonneuvei

Scientific classification
- Kingdom: Plantae
- Clade: Tracheophytes
- Clade: Angiosperms
- Clade: Eudicots
- Clade: Rosids
- Order: Myrtales
- Family: Myrtaceae
- Subfamily: Myrtoideae
- Tribe: Chamelaucieae
- Genus: Aluta; Rye & Trudgen

Species
- See text

= Aluta =

Genus of flowering plants

Aluta is a genus of small shrubs in the family Myrtaceae. Species occur in Western Australia, South Australia and the Northern Territory. When the genus was erected in 2000, three species were transferred from the genus Thryptomene.

Species include:

- Aluta appressa (C.R.P.Andrews) Rye & Trudgen
- Aluta aspera (E.Pritz.) Rye & Trudgen
- Aluta maisonneuvei (F.Muell. Rye & Trudgen)
- Aluta quadrata Rye & Trudgen
- Aluta teres Rye & Trudgen
