= Enekbatus longistylus =

Conservation status
- Priority Three — Poorly Known Taxa (DEC)

Scientific classification
- Kingdom: Plantae
- Clade: Tracheophytes
- Clade: Angiosperms
- Clade: Eudicots
- Clade: Rosids
- Order: Myrtales
- Family: Myrtaceae
- Genus: Enekbatus
- Species: E. longistylus

Binomial name
- Enekbatus longistylus Trudgen & Rye

Species of flowering plant

Enekbatus longistylus is a shrub endemic to Western Australia.

The shrub typically grows to a height of 0.3 to 0.6 metres (1 to 2 ft). It blooms between September and October producing pink-violet flowers.

It is found on sand plains in the Mid West and Wheatbelt regions of Western Australia between Geraldton and Three Springs where it grows in sandy soils.
