= Enekbatus bounites =

Conservation status
- Priority Two — Poorly Known Taxa (DEC)

Scientific classification
- Kingdom: Plantae
- Clade: Tracheophytes
- Clade: Angiosperms
- Clade: Eudicots
- Clade: Rosids
- Order: Myrtales
- Family: Myrtaceae
- Genus: Enekbatus
- Species: E. bounites

Binomial name
- Enekbatus bounites Trudgen & Rye

Species of flowering plant

Enekbatus bounites is a shrub endemic to Western Australia.

The spreading shrub typically grows to a height of 0.3 metres (1 ft). It is found along the west coast on hilltops in the Mid West region of Western Australia between Geraldton and Northampton where it grows in clay soils over sandstone.
