= Enekbatus cristatus =

Conservation status
- Priority Two — Poorly Known Taxa (DEC)

Scientific classification
- Kingdom: Plantae
- Clade: Tracheophytes
- Clade: Angiosperms
- Clade: Eudicots
- Clade: Rosids
- Order: Myrtales
- Family: Myrtaceae
- Genus: Enekbatus
- Species: E. cristatus

Binomial name
- Enekbatus cristatus Trudgen & Rye

Species of flowering plant

Enekbatus cristatus is a shrub endemic to Western Australia.

== Description ==
The open and sprawling shrub typically grows to a height of 0.3 metres (1 ft). It is found on sloping sand plains in the Mid West region of Western Australia around Northampton where it grows in sandy-gravelly soils over sandstone.
