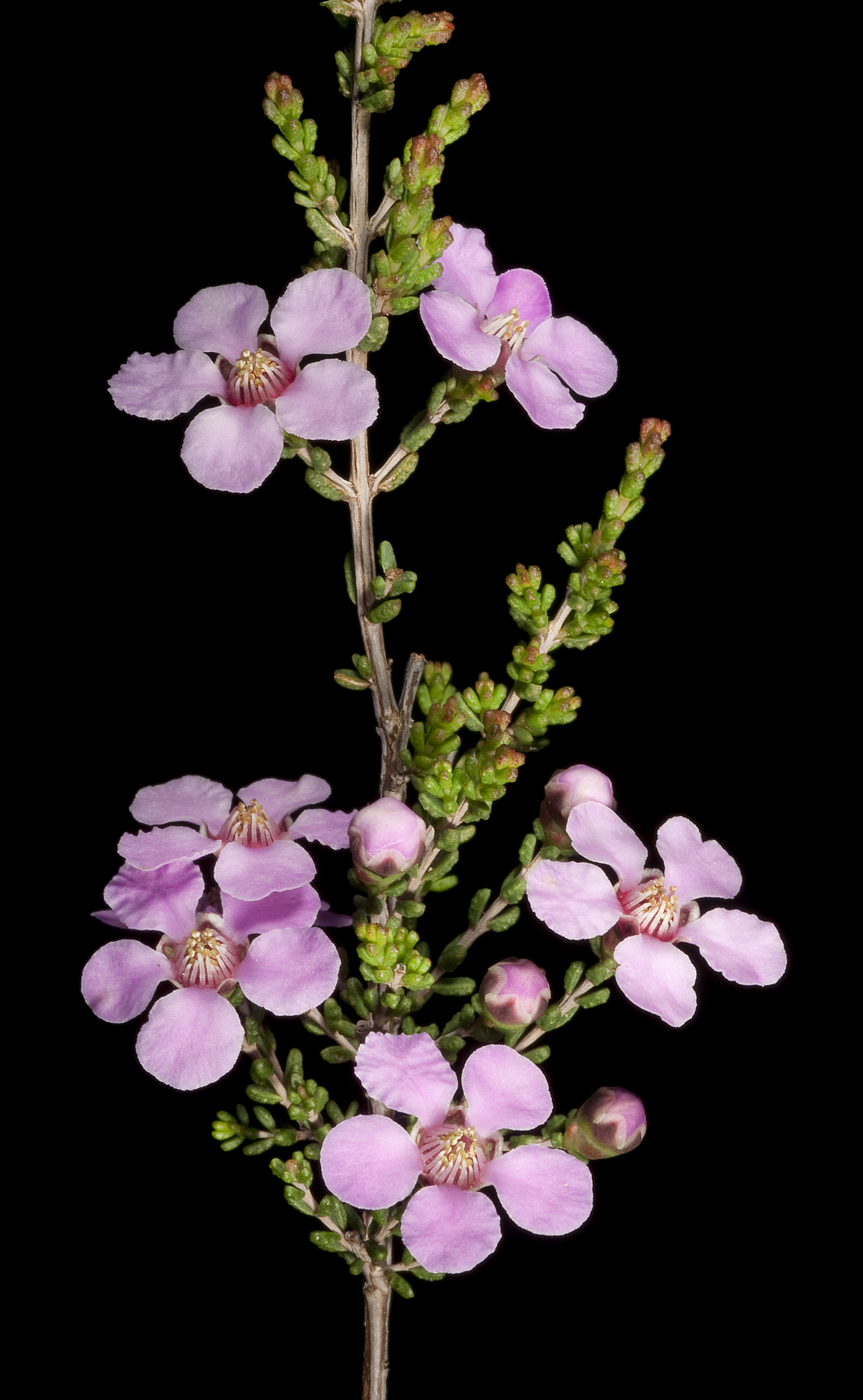

Scientific classification
- Kingdom: Plantae
- Clade: Tracheophytes
- Clade: Angiosperms
- Clade: Eudicots
- Clade: Rosids
- Order: Myrtales
- Family: Myrtaceae
- Genus: Enekbatus
- Species: E. sessilis

Binomial name
- Enekbatus sessilis Trudgen & Rye

= Enekbatus sessilis =

Species of flowering plant

Enekbatus sessilis is a shrub endemic to Western Australia.

The bushy shrub typically grows to a height of 0.3 to 0.7 metres (1 to 2 ft). It blooms between August and September producing white-pink-purple flowers.

It is found on sand plains and flats in the Mid West and Wheatbelt regions of Western Australia between Northampton and Dalwallinu where it grows in sandy-loamy-clay soils containing gravel over laterite or sandstone.
