= Enekbatus =

Scientific classification
- Kingdom: Plantae
- Clade: Tracheophytes
- Clade: Angiosperms
- Clade: Eudicots
- Clade: Rosids
- Order: Myrtales
- Family: Myrtaceae
- Subfamily: Myrtoideae
- Tribe: Chamelaucieae
- Genus: Enekbatus; Trudgen & Rye

Genus of flowering plants

Enekbatus is a genus of ten species of small to medium Western Australian shrubs in the family Myrtaceae, moved from Baeckea in 2010.

== Species ==
The genus includes the following species:

- Enekbatus bounites
- Enekbatus clavifolius
- Enekbatus cristatus
- Enekbatus cryptandroides
- Enekbatus dualis
- Enekbatus eremaeus
- Enekbatus longistylus
- Enekbatus planifolius
- Enekbatus sessilis
- Enekbatus stowardii
