= Enekbatus cryptandroides =

Scientific classification
- Kingdom: Plantae
- Clade: Tracheophytes
- Clade: Angiosperms
- Clade: Eudicots
- Clade: Rosids
- Order: Myrtales
- Family: Myrtaceae
- Genus: Enekbatus
- Species: E. cryptandroides

Binomial name
- Enekbatus cryptandroides (F.Muell.) Trudgen & Rye

Synonyms
- Baeckea cryptandroides

Species of flowering plant

Enekbatus cryptandroides is a shrub endemic to Western Australia.

The dense shrub typically grows to a height of 0.7 metres (2 ft) and blooms between September and October, producing pink-white flowers. The species shares features with Enekbatus clavifolius, both of which have ten stamens that are oppositely arranged to the sepals and petals. They also have tuberculate and usually often fruit containing many smooth seeds partly covered by an adherent scurfy layer.

It is found in the Mid West and Goldfields regions of Western Australia between Wiluna and east of Kalgoorlie where it grows in sandy-clay soils.

The species was first formally described as Baeckea cryptandroides by the botanist Ferdinand von Mueller in 1876 as part of the work Fragmenta Phytographiae Australiae. It was reclassified to the Enekbatus genera in 2010 by Barbara Rye and Malcolm Trudgen in the work Enekbatus, a new Western Australian genus of Myrtaceae with a multi-locular indehiscent fruit, as published in the journal Nuytsia.
