= Enekbatus clavifolius =

Scientific classification
- Kingdom: Plantae
- Clade: Tracheophytes
- Clade: Angiosperms
- Clade: Eudicots
- Clade: Rosids
- Order: Myrtales
- Family: Myrtaceae
- Genus: Enekbatus
- Species: E. clavifolius

Binomial name
- Enekbatus clavifolius (S.Moore) Trudgen & Rye

Synonyms
- Baeckea clavifolia

Species of plant

Enekbatus clavifolius is a shrub endemic to Western Australia.

The spreading shrub typically grows to a height of 1 metre (3 ft) and blooms between July and September producing pink-purple flowers. The species shares features with Enekbatus cryptandroides, both of which have to have ten stamens that are oppositely arranged to the sepals and petals. They also have tuberculate and usually often fruit containing many smooth seeds partly covered by an adherent scurfy layer.

It is found in the Wheatbelt region of Western Australia between Merredin and Nungarin where it grows in sandy-gravelly soils over laterite.

The species was first formally described as Baeckea clavifolia by the English botanist Spencer Le Marchant Moore in 1920 as part of the work A contribution to the Flora of Australia, published in the Journal of the Linnean Society, Botany. It was reclassified to the Enekbatus genera in 2010 by Barbara Rye and Malcolm Trudgen in the work Enekbatus, a new Western Australian genus of Myrtaceae with a multi-locular indehiscent fruit, as published in the journal Nuytsia.
