= Crotalaria mentiens =

Conservation status
- Endangered (IUCN 3.1)

Scientific classification
- Kingdom: Plantae
- Clade: Tracheophytes
- Clade: Angiosperms
- Clade: Eudicots
- Clade: Rosids
- Order: Fabales
- Family: Fabaceae
- Subfamily: Faboideae
- Genus: Crotalaria
- Species: C. mentiens

Binomial name
- Crotalaria mentiens R.M.Polhill

Species of legume

Crotalaria mentiens is a species of plant in the family Fabaceae. It is found only in Cameroon. Its natural habitats are subtropical or tropical dry forests and subtropical or tropical dry lowland grassland. It is threatened by habitat loss.
