= Crotalaria peduncularis =

Scientific classification
- Kingdom: Plantae
- Clade: Tracheophytes
- Clade: Angiosperms
- Clade: Eudicots
- Clade: Rosids
- Order: Fabales
- Family: Fabaceae
- Subfamily: Faboideae
- Genus: Crotalaria
- Species: C. peduncularis

Binomial name
- Crotalaria peduncularis Graham ex Wight & Arn.

Synonyms
- Crotalaria elegans Bedd.; Crotalaria elegans hort. ex DC.

Species of plant

Crotalaria peduncularis is a species of herbaceous plant in the subfamily Faboideae. It is found in India.
