= Crotalaria sandoorensis =

Scientific classification
- Kingdom: Plantae
- Clade: Tracheophytes
- Clade: Angiosperms
- Clade: Eudicots
- Clade: Rosids
- Order: Fabales
- Family: Fabaceae
- Subfamily: Faboideae
- Genus: Crotalaria
- Species: C. sandoorensis

Binomial name
- Crotalaria sandoorensis Beddome

Species of plant

Crotalaria sandoorensis is a species of plant endemic to India. This species of plant was collected by Richard Henry Beddome from the hills around Sandur in Karnataka.

== Description ==
A shrub that grows up to 1.5 meters tall with stem covered with hairs. It has simple leaves that are 3.2 to 6 cm × 1.2 to 2.2 cm and subsessile. The flowers are yellow and keel petals are hairy outside.

== Ecology ==
It grows in rocky terrain around hills and flowers between October and March.

== Distribution ==
It is found in Karnataka, Andhra Pradesh and Telangana states in India.
