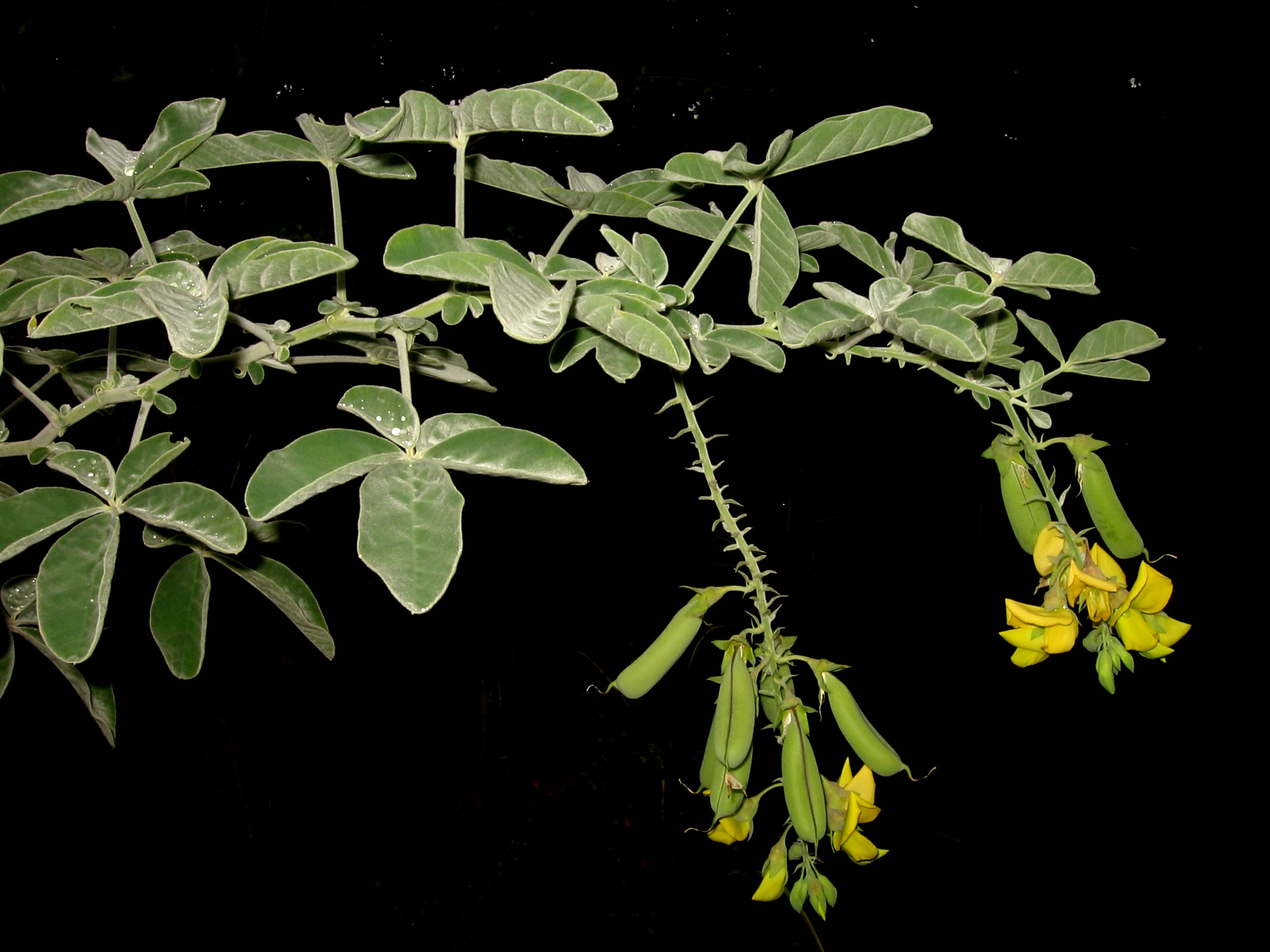

Scientific classification
- Kingdom: Plantae
- Clade: Tracheophytes
- Clade: Angiosperms
- Clade: Eudicots
- Clade: Rosids
- Order: Fabales
- Family: Fabaceae
- Subfamily: Faboideae
- Genus: Crotalaria
- Species: C. digitata

Binomial name
- Crotalaria digitata Hook

= Crotalaria digitata =

Species of plant

Crotalaria digitata is a species of plant endemic to India.

== Distribution ==
This plant was originally collected by Robert Wight in 1829 from the hills around Madurai in Tamil Nadu and named it Crotalaria tomentosa. Hook found that the name already exists for another species and hence renamed it to Crotalaria digitata in 1831. This species was rediscovered from the original Madurai hills again in 2007 after 178 years of its original discovery. A collection from Suntikoppa in Karnataka was initially identified as Crotalaria digitata was later found to be Crotalaria grahamiana, hence confirming the distribution of this species to the hills around Madurai.

== Description and habitat ==
It is a shrub that grows around 2 meters high. It has compound leaves that are digitate with 5-7 leaflets and alternate. The tomentosa is silky-white that on drying turns brown. Its flowers are bi-sexual and flowering season is between October and December. It was found growing on crevices on rock surfaces and boulders. It can be separated by similar looking Crotalaria grahamiana by lack of hairs on the undersurface and linear obovate leaves and from Crotalaria quinquefolia that has more linear looking leaves with differentiating apex.
