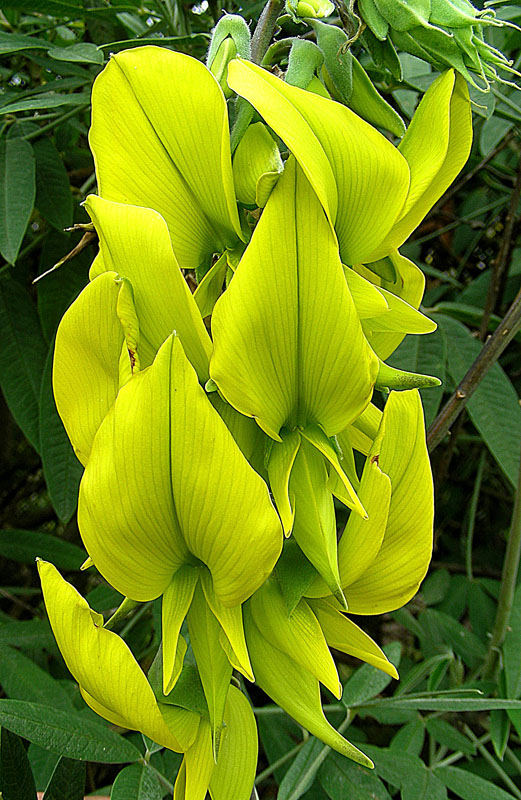
- Inflorescence

Scientific classification
- Kingdom: Plantae
- Clade: Embryophytes
- Clade: Tracheophytes
- Clade: Spermatophytes
- Clade: Angiosperms
- Clade: Eudicots
- Clade: Rosids
- Order: Fabales
- Family: Fabaceae
- Subfamily: Faboideae
- Genus: Crotalaria
- Species: C. laburnifolia

Binomial name
- Crotalaria laburnifolia L.

Synonyms
- List: Clavulium laburnifolium (L.) M.R.Almeida; Clavulium pedunculosum Desv.; Crotalaria capensis Baker; Crotalaria helenae Buscal. & Muschl.; Crotalaria pedunculosa Desv.

= Crotalaria laburnifolia =

Species of flowering plant

Crotalaria laburnifolia, called the rattle pod, is a highly variable species of flowering plant in the genus Crotalaria, widely distributed in central, eastern and southern Africa, the Seychelles, the Indian Subcontinent, Thailand, the Lesser Sunda Islands, Java, and Queensland in Australia. It has been introduced into Western Australia. It has gained the Royal Horticultural Society's Award of Garden Merit.
