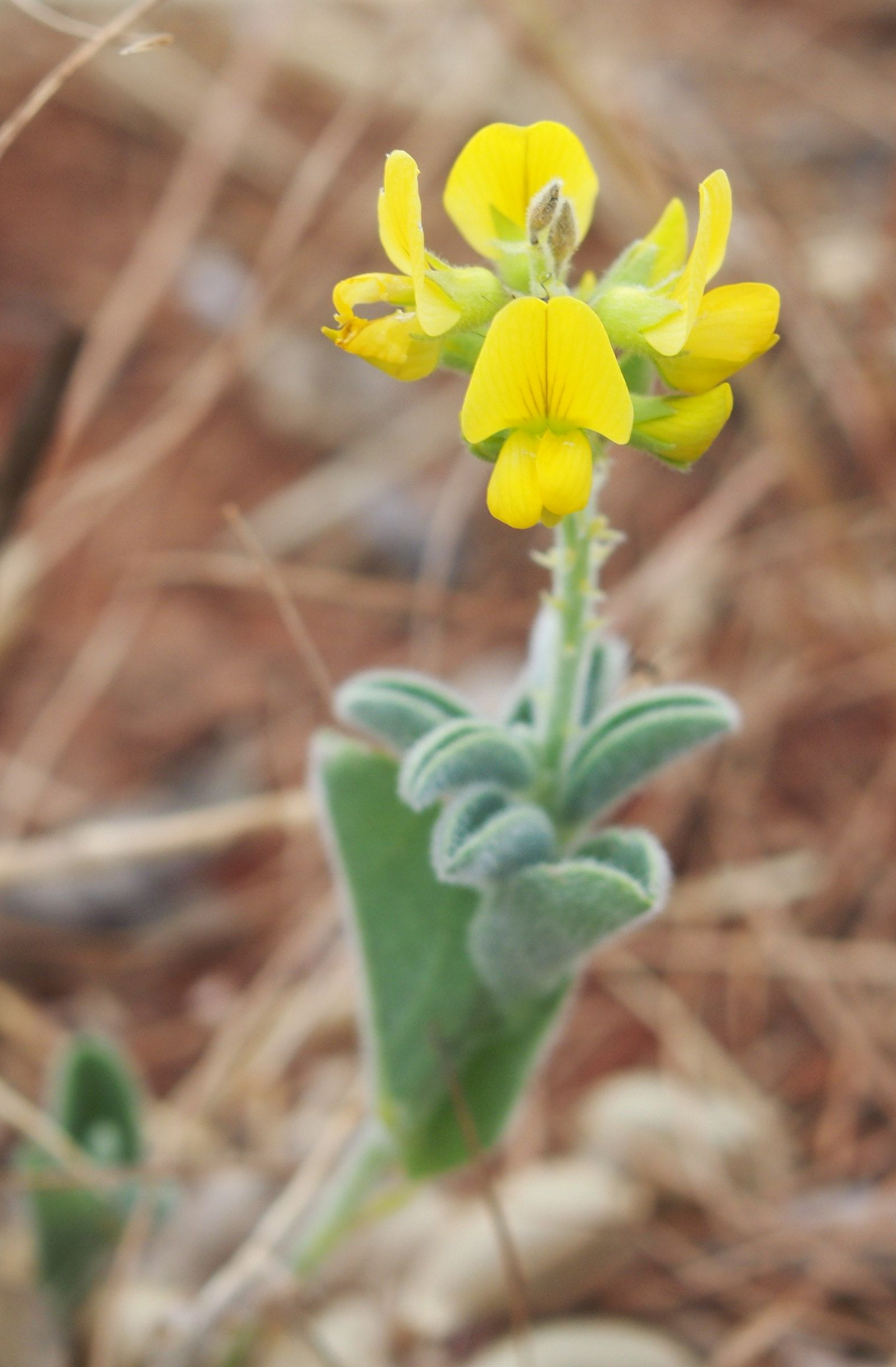

Scientific classification
- Kingdom: Plantae
- Clade: Tracheophytes
- Clade: Angiosperms
- Clade: Eudicots
- Clade: Rosids
- Order: Fabales
- Family: Fabaceae
- Subfamily: Faboideae
- Genus: Crotalaria
- Species: C. smithiana

Binomial name
- Crotalaria smithiana A.T.Lee

= Crotalaria smithiana =

Species of plant in the pea family

Crotalaria smithiana is a species of plant in the family Fabaceae, first described in 1978 by Alma Theodora Lee.

It is found in inland New South Wales, Queensland, Western Australia, South Australia and the Northern Territory. It flowers after rain.
