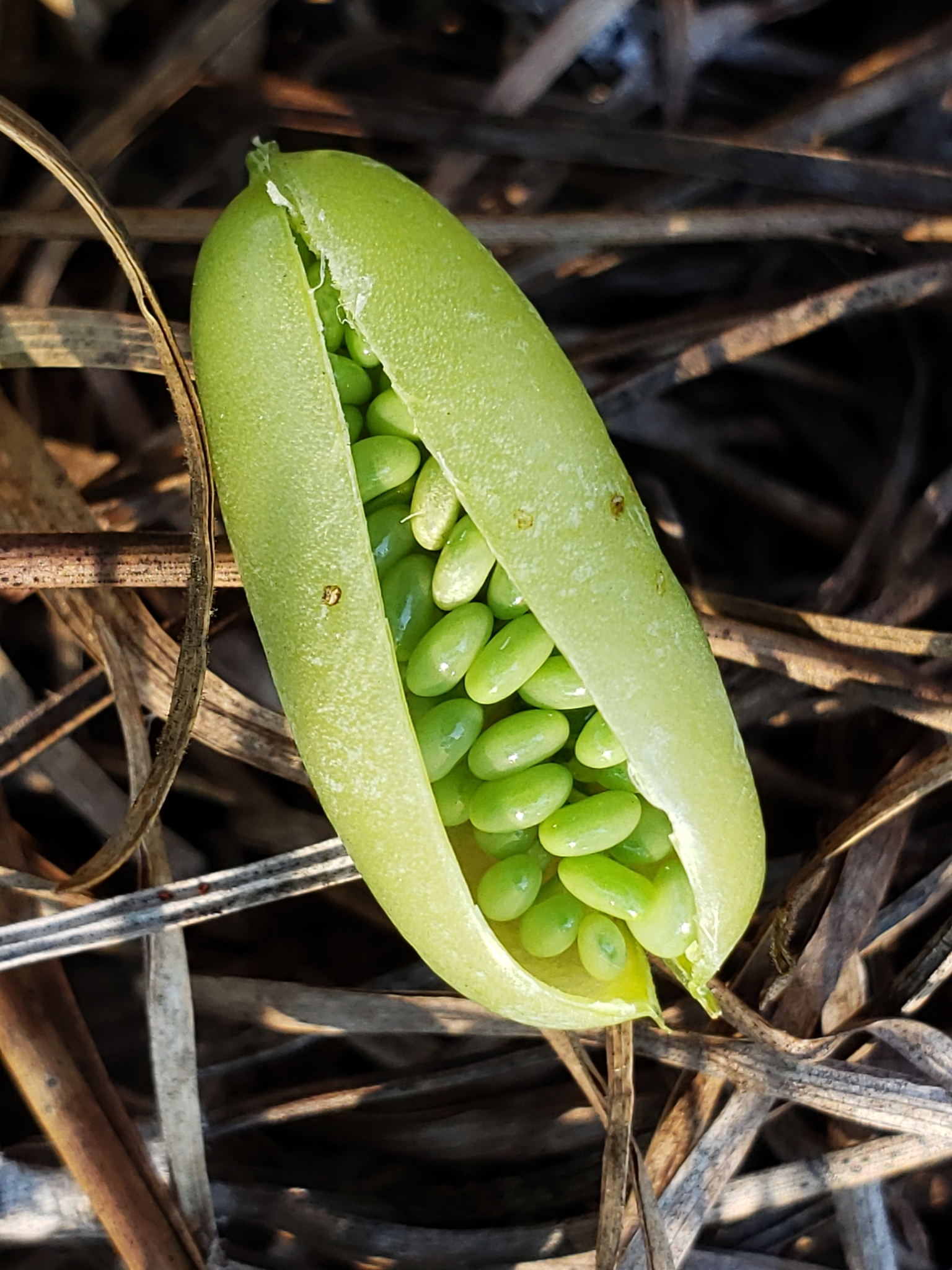

Scientific classification
- Kingdom: Plantae
- Clade: Embryophytes
- Clade: Tracheophytes
- Clade: Spermatophytes
- Clade: Angiosperms
- Clade: Eudicots
- Clade: Rosids
- Order: Fabales
- Family: Fabaceae
- Subfamily: Faboideae
- Genus: Crotalaria
- Species: C. rotundifolia

Binomial name
- Crotalaria rotundifolia J.F.Gmel.

= Crotalaria rotundifolia =

Flowering plant

Crotalaria rotundifolia is a flowering plant in the genus Crotalaria. Common names for the species include rabbitbells. It is a perennial dicot with yellow flowers that grows in the Southeastern United States. It is part of the pea family (Fabaceae), and is a nitrogen-fixing legume. The flower arrangement is raceme and the leaf type is simple. They die back in freezing temperatures.

This species is commonly found in longleaf pine savannas. It has also been observed growing in habitats such as slash pine flatwoods, sandhill communities, and in scrub environments.

== Ecology ==
Crotalaria rotundifolia is insect pollinated and is recorded to have been visited in northern Florida by Anthidiellum notatum and Anthidiellum notatum.
