= Enekbatus stowardii =

Scientific classification
- Kingdom: Plantae
- Clade: Tracheophytes
- Clade: Angiosperms
- Clade: Eudicots
- Clade: Rosids
- Order: Myrtales
- Family: Myrtaceae
- Genus: Enekbatus
- Species: E. stowardii

Binomial name
- Enekbatus stowardii (S.Moore) Trudgen & Rye

Species of plant

Enekbatus stowardii is a shrub endemic to Western Australia.

== Taxonomy ==
It was initially formally described as Baeckea stowardii by the botanist Spencer Le Marchant Moore in 1920 as part of the work A contribution to the Flora of Australia. published in the Journal of the Linnean Society, Botany. It was transferred to Enekbatus in 2010 by Barbara Rye and Malcolm Trudgen in the work Enekbatus, a new Western Australian genus of Myrtaceae with a multi-locular indehiscent fruit. published in the journal Nuytsia.

== Description ==
The low shrub typically grows to a height of 0.5 to 1.0 m (2 to 3 ft). It blooms between July and October producing pink-red flowers.

== Distribution and habitat ==
It is found on plains, hillsides, road verges and flats in the Mid West and Wheatbelt regions of Western Australia between Morawa and Yalgoo where it grows in sandy-loamy-clay soils often containing rocky gravel over granite .
