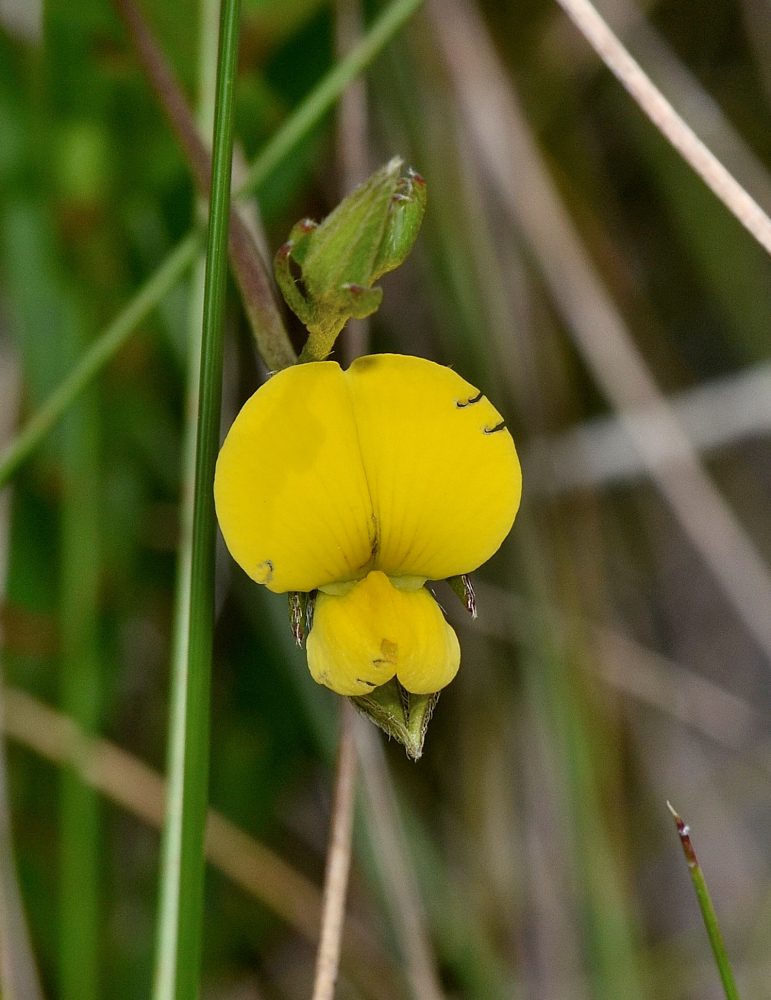

Scientific classification
- Kingdom: Plantae
- Clade: Tracheophytes
- Clade: Angiosperms
- Clade: Eudicots
- Clade: Rosids
- Order: Fabales
- Family: Fabaceae
- Subfamily: Faboideae
- Genus: Crotalaria
- Species: C. purshii

Binomial name
- Crotalaria purshii DC.

= Crotalaria purshii =

Species of flowering plant

Crotalaria purshii, or Pursh's rattlebox, is a flowering plant. It grows in parts of the southeastern United States.

It is a rosid eudicot in the Fabaceae family and Crotalaria genus.

Frederick Traugott Pursh was a German-American botanist for whom the Purshia genus and several plants are named.

== Description ==
C. purshii is a perennial herb that grows 0.2-0.5 m in height. The leaves are simple, with middle and upper leaves linear to lanceolate in shape, growing 4-10 mm wide and 3-6 cm long, while the lower leaves are oblong to spatulate, growing 6-15 mm wide and 2-3 cm long. The peduncle grows 3-12 cm in length, and has 3-6 flowers. The petals are yellow in color, and are equal in length or longer than the calyx, which is closely subtended by 2 linear, flat bractlets that grow 4-6 mm long. The plant is densely pubescent.

== Distribution and habitat ==
C. purshii is endemic to the coastal plain of the southeastern United States, ranging from southeast Virginia to central Florida, and west to Louisiana.

It grows along roadsides, in sandy openings, and dry to mesic pinelands, occurring in a range of light conditions and a variety of mostly sandy soil types.

== Conservation and cultural use ==
The genus Crotalaria is listed as a noxious weed by the Arkansas State Plant Board, but C. purshii is listed as endangered and possibly extirpated by the Tennessee Department of Environment and Conservation.

The seeds of C. purshii can be used as a coffee substitute, but this is not recommended as improper preparation can result in poisoning.
