= Crotalaria bamendae =

Conservation status
- Least Concern (IUCN 3.1)

Scientific classification
- Kingdom: Plantae
- Clade: Tracheophytes
- Clade: Angiosperms
- Clade: Eudicots
- Clade: Rosids
- Order: Fabales
- Family: Fabaceae
- Subfamily: Faboideae
- Genus: Crotalaria
- Species: C. bamendae

Binomial name
- Crotalaria bamendae Hepper

Species of legume

Crotalaria bamendae is a species of plant in the family Fabaceae. It is found in Angola, Cameroon, and Nigeria. Its natural habitat is subtropical or tropical dry lowland grassland. It is threatened by habitat loss.
