= Crotalaria similis =

Scientific classification
- Kingdom: Plantae
- Clade: Tracheophytes
- Clade: Angiosperms
- Clade: Eudicots
- Clade: Rosids
- Order: Fabales
- Family: Fabaceae
- Subfamily: Faboideae
- Genus: Crotalaria
- Species: C. similis

Binomial name
- Crotalaria similis Hemsl. (1895)

Species of plant

Crotalaria similis, also known as the Pingtung Curara pea, belongs to the family Fabaceae and genus Crotalaria. It is a perennial crawling herb, an endemic species of Taiwan which the distribution is limited to the Eastern seaside of the Hengchun Peninsula.

== Description ==
Crotalaria similis is a small herb with dense layer of soft hair. Its height is between 5 and 20 cm (2.0 and 7.9 in) and grows on sloping land. It has near sessile simple leaf. The leaf is oval to egg shaped with a length between 3 and 8 mm (0.12 and 0.31 in) and width between 2 and 4 mm (0.079 and 0.157 in), pointy tips and no stipula. It has a terminal raceme inflorescence of 3–5 flowers, or as a solitary flower. At the base of the calyx, there are two pieces of bracteoles. The calyx has a 6 mm length with bifid top but slightly connate. It has a dense layer of hair. The yellow corolla and the calyx are equal length. The stamen has a dimorphipic anther. The morphology of the exine is the shape of round pores to fine perforating striae. Their pollens are the same, approximately 20μ in size with tricolporate shape. The outer fruit is in the shape of long-circular pods, 1 cm in length. Each pod contains between 10 and 22 seeds.

== Classification ==
The first naming and publishing of Crotalaria similis was done in 1895 by William Botting Hemsley, in the Annals of Botany. He followed Augustine Henry's plant specimen descriptions over the new species accordingly, and Crotalaria similis was amongst it (sample specimen number 252 as evidence). Hemsley believed that the morphology of this species is like Crotalaria perpusilla Collett & Hemsl which is originated from Myanmar. However, the leaf of this species is narrower.

== Distribution and the habitat ==
Crotalaria similis is a rare species with the narrowest distribution amongst the endemic Crotalaria plants in Taiwan. Its distribution can only be found in the open grass along the east coast of Kenting below 100 above sea level. There are two larger distribution centers, one group situated in the Fengchuisha, Hengchun Peninsula, which takes up 50% of the entire population, and the other group at the grassland of Longpan, which takes up 30% of the total population. There are several types of habitats, including the calcareous red earth, sand, grasslands, and others. Amongst them, Crotalaria similis is mostly found in the grasslands, next is the sands and least being the calcareous red earth. Excessive human interference, such as afforestation, artificial planting, trample and other apparent ways resulting in the disappearance of the groups. However, limited interference, such as grazing benefit their survival.

== Artificial breeding and utilization ==
As Crotalaria similis has a very restricted habitat, it is scarce in number and is an endangered species. It is not being cultivated and utilized. However, Crotalaria pallida Ait. var. obovata (G. Don) Polhill., Crotalaria zanzibarica Benth. and so forth that also belongs to the Crotalaria can be used as medicine. But these medicinal herbs may contain alkaloids that poses a certain level of toxicity to human.
