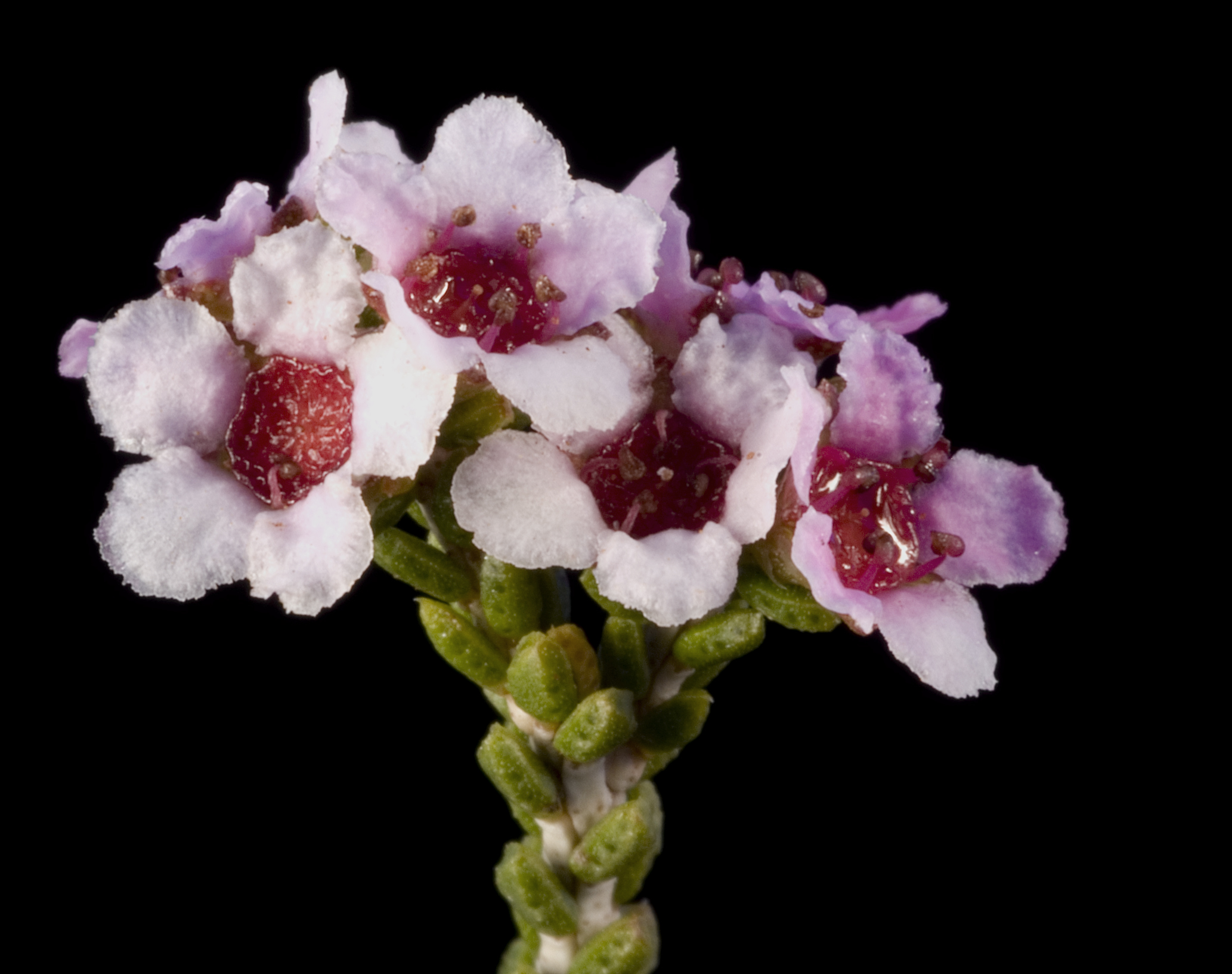

Scientific classification
- Kingdom: Plantae
- Clade: Tracheophytes
- Clade: Angiosperms
- Clade: Eudicots
- Clade: Rosids
- Order: Myrtales
- Family: Myrtaceae
- Genus: Aluta
- Species: A. maisonneuvei

Binomial name
- Aluta maisonneuvei (F.Muell.) Rye & Trudgen

= Aluta maisonneuvei =

Genus of flowering plants

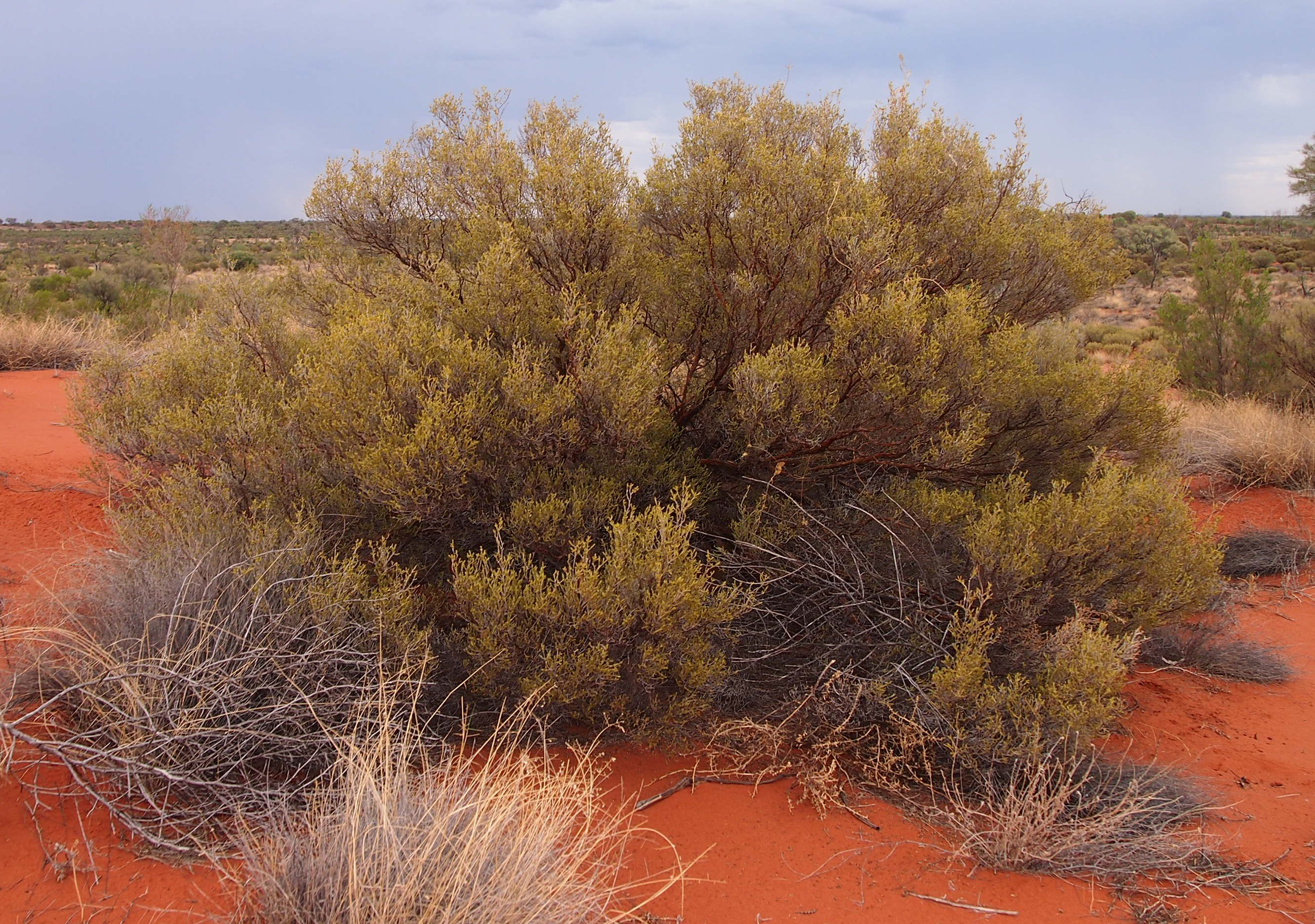
Habit

Aluta maisonneuvei subsp. maisonneuvei

Aluta maisonneuvei commonly known as desert heath myrtle, is a flowering plant in the family Myrtaceae. It is woody shrub with small leaves and pink to whitish flowers and grows in Western Australia, South Australia and the Northern Territory.

== Description ==
Aluta maisonneuvei is a dense, woody shrub 0.3–1.5 m (1 ft 0 in – 4 ft 11 in) high, sometimes spreading to 1.5 m (4 ft 11 in) wide, branches usually arising from the ground at an angle. Leaves are small, crowded, sessile, up to 2 mm (0.079 in) long, oblong or roundish in rows of four along the stem. Flowers are whitish-pink, 5 petalled, up to 2 mm (0.079 in) in diameter with a red or pink central disc. Flowering occurs from early winter to early spring and the fruit compressed, globular shaped and 1.5–2 mm (0.059–0.079 in) long.

== Taxonomy and naming ==
This species was described in 1864 by Ferdinand von Mueller who gave it the name Thryptomene maisonneuvei. In 2000 Barbara Lynette Rye and Malcolm Eric Trudgen changed the name to Aluta maisonneuvei and the description was published in Nuytsia. The specific epithet (maisonneuvei) is in honour of Michel Charles Durieu de Maisonneuve director of the botanic garden at Bordeaux.

== Distribution and habitat ==
Desert Heath Myrtle grows on red sandplains, near sand dunes and yellow clayey soils in South Australia, Western Australian and the Northern Territory.
