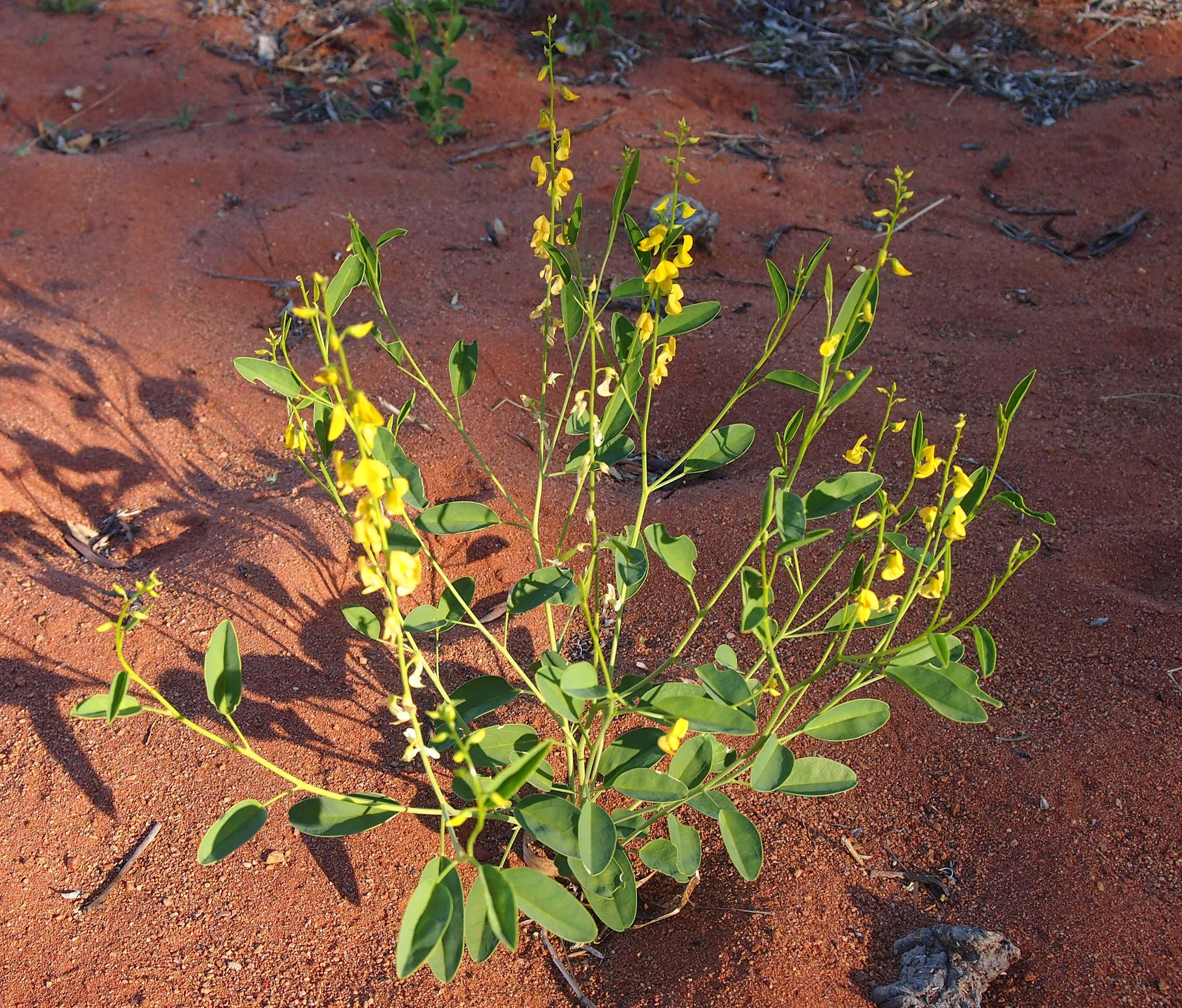

Scientific classification
- Kingdom: Plantae
- Clade: Tracheophytes
- Clade: Angiosperms
- Clade: Eudicots
- Clade: Rosids
- Order: Fabales
- Family: Fabaceae
- Subfamily: Faboideae
- Genus: Crotalaria
- Species: C. novae-hollandiae

Binomial name
- Crotalaria novae-hollandiae DC.

= Crotalaria novae-hollandiae =

New Holland rattlepod

Species of plant

Crotalaria novae-hollandiae, known commonly as the New Holland rattlepod, is a species of flowering plant that is native to Australia.

== Description ==
The New Holland rattlepod is a member of the Eudicots, a part of the larger Angiosperm division of flowering plants. It has characteristically bright yellow flowers and larger brown pods. Since they are in the family Fabaceae, they are distantly related to legumes such as peas, lima beans, and lentils. Although some members of this genus indigenous to other countries have edible flowers which may be eaten raw and seeds that are edible and nutritious if treated correctly, the New Holland Rattlepods are known to be toxic and should not be used as a source of food for humans.

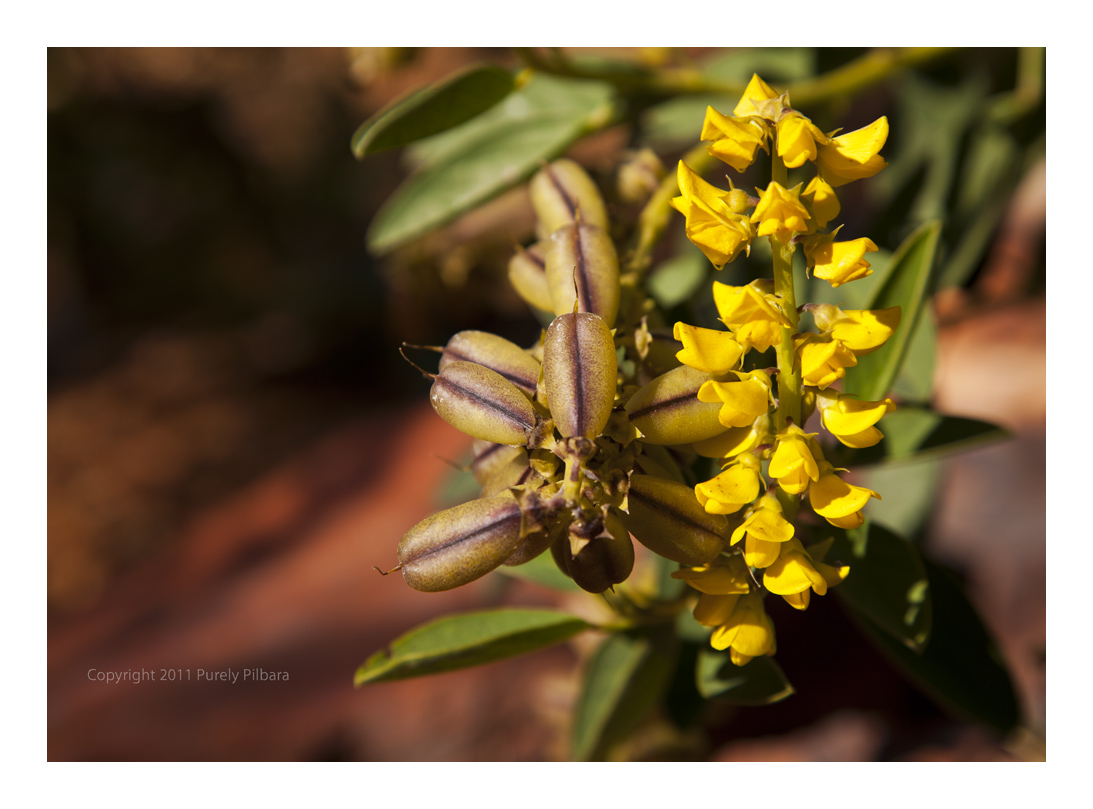
Pods and Flowers of the Crotalaria novae-hollandiae

== Morphology ==
The Crotalaria novae-hollandiae grows as a shrub usually in sandy soils. It is an annual that has dark green leaves, bright yellow flowers in a spike inflorescence, and brown club shaped pods. The yellow flowers are in a type of clog shape, containing three asymmetrical petals. These pods rattle when mature and they contain toxic alkaloids. These dehiscent pods are most likely a defense mechanism to assure that animals do not commonly ingest these plants, as doing so is poisonous to a number of them. The New Holland Rattlepod grows to about 80 centimeters tall with leaves slightly pointed at the apex and pods crowded on the stem, which hang down when they mature.

== Habitat and ecology ==
This plant tends to grow on soils often in association with the Wedge Leaf Rattlepod and nearly always confined to the river banks and riverfronts that are prone to periodic flooding. For example, it is widespread in the areas around the Victoria River. They seem to favor degraded country and in good seasons often occur in dense patches and are very noticeable when in flower because of their bright yellow color.

== Uses ==
Due to its alkaloid properties, Crotalaria novae-hollandiae is known to be a somewhat poisonous plant. The New Holland Rattlepod is not considered to be good food to give to livestock. The plant contains toxic elements that are potentially dangerous to horses and other farm animals. In earlier feeding trials with horses, consumption led to deaths and symptoms typical of Kimberley horse disease, also known as walkabout disease. These pyrrolizidine alkaloids can also cause damage in liver, lungs and in pigs in the kidney. Additional damage can be done to the liver and lungs and cause dummy syndrome in horses and cattle
