= Crotalaria ledermannii =

Conservation status
- Vulnerable (IUCN 3.1)

Scientific classification
- Kingdom: Plantae
- Clade: Tracheophytes
- Clade: Angiosperms
- Clade: Eudicots
- Clade: Rosids
- Order: Fabales
- Family: Fabaceae
- Subfamily: Faboideae
- Genus: Crotalaria
- Species: C. ledermannii

Binomial name
- Crotalaria ledermannii E.G.Baker

Species of legume

Crotalaria ledermannii is a species of plant in the family Fabaceae. It is found in Cameroon and Nigeria. Its natural habitats are subtropical or tropical dry forests, as well as subtropical or tropical dry lowland grassland. It is threatened by habitat loss.
