= Crotalaria exaltata =

Conservation status
- Least Concern (IUCN 3.1)

Scientific classification
- Kingdom: Plantae
- Clade: Tracheophytes
- Clade: Angiosperms
- Clade: Eudicots
- Clade: Rosids
- Order: Fabales
- Family: Fabaceae
- Subfamily: Faboideae
- Genus: Crotalaria
- Species: C. exaltata

Binomial name
- Crotalaria exaltata Polhill

Species of legume

Crotalaria exaltata is a species of flowering plant in the family Fabaceae. It is a shrub or tree native to and found only in Ethiopia.
