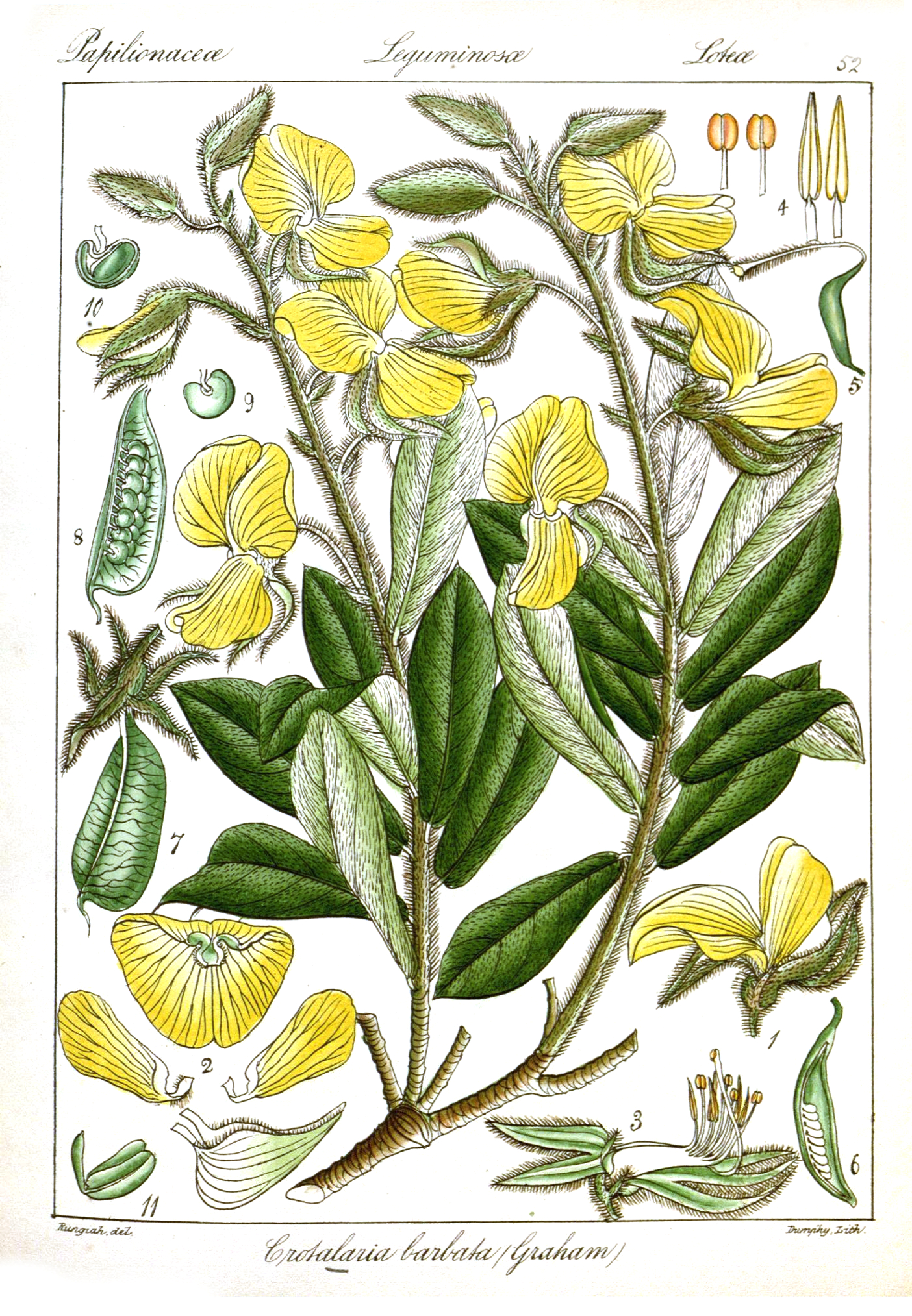

Scientific classification
- Kingdom: Plantae
- Clade: Tracheophytes
- Clade: Angiosperms
- Clade: Eudicots
- Clade: Rosids
- Order: Fabales
- Family: Fabaceae
- Subfamily: Faboideae
- Genus: Crotalaria
- Species: C. barbata

Binomial name
- Crotalaria barbata Graham ex Wight & Arn.

= Crotalaria barbata =

Species of legume

Crotalaria barbata is a species of plant in the family Fabaceae. It is found in South West India.
