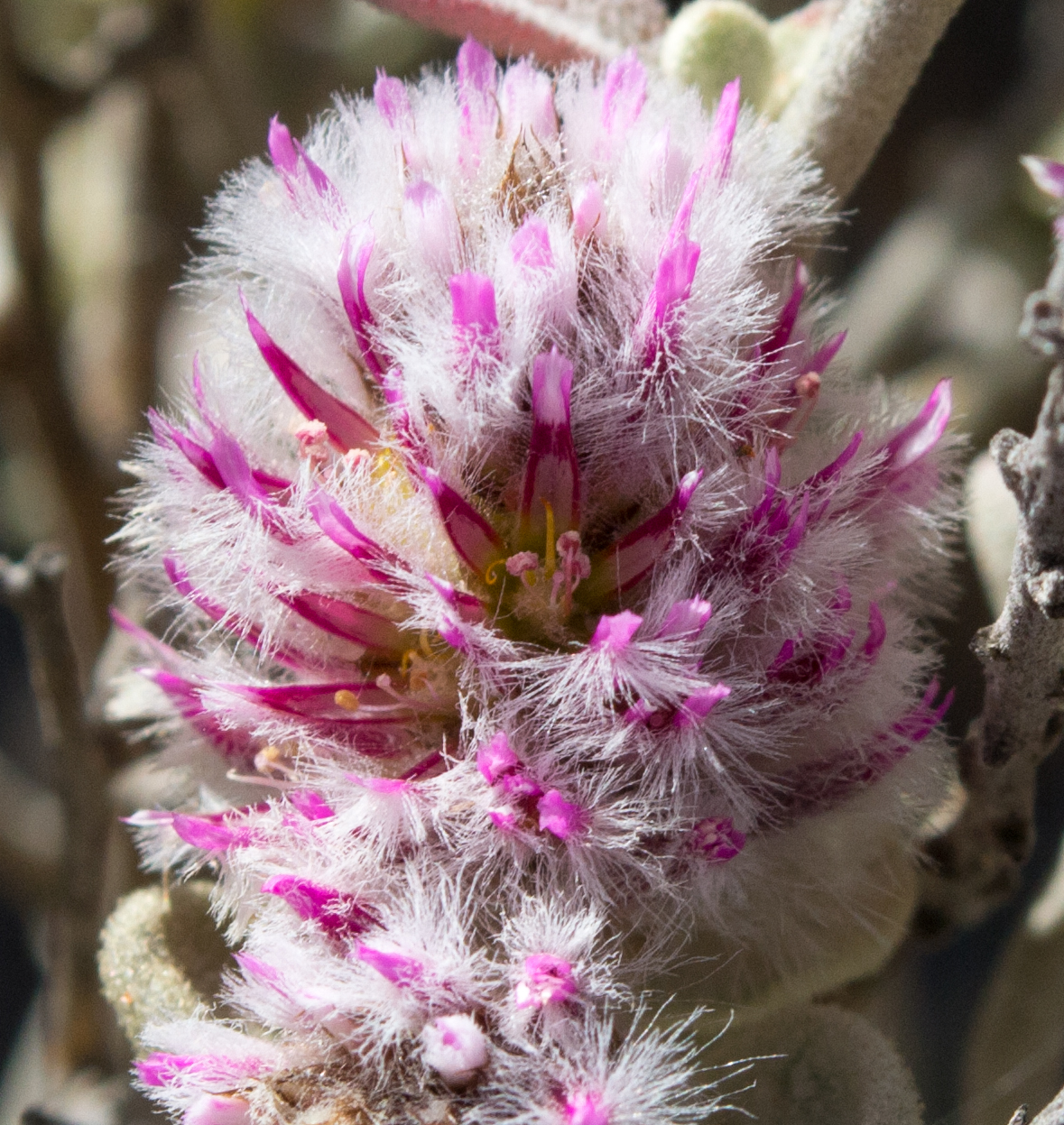

Scientific classification
- Kingdom: Plantae
- Clade: Tracheophytes
- Clade: Angiosperms
- Clade: Eudicots
- Order: Caryophyllales
- Family: Amaranthaceae
- Genus: Ptilotus
- Species: P. obovatus

Binomial name
- Ptilotus obovatus (Gaudich.) F.Muell.

Synonyms
- Gomotriche tomentosa Turcz. orth. var.; Goniotriche tomentosa Turcz.; Ptilotus lindleyi F.Muell.; Ptilotus obovatus (Gaudich.) F.Muell. var. obovatus; Trichinium lanatum Lindl.; Trichinium obovatum Gaudich.; Trichinium obovatum Gaudich. var. obovatum; Trichinium variabile F.Muell.

= Ptilotus obovatus =

Species of shrub

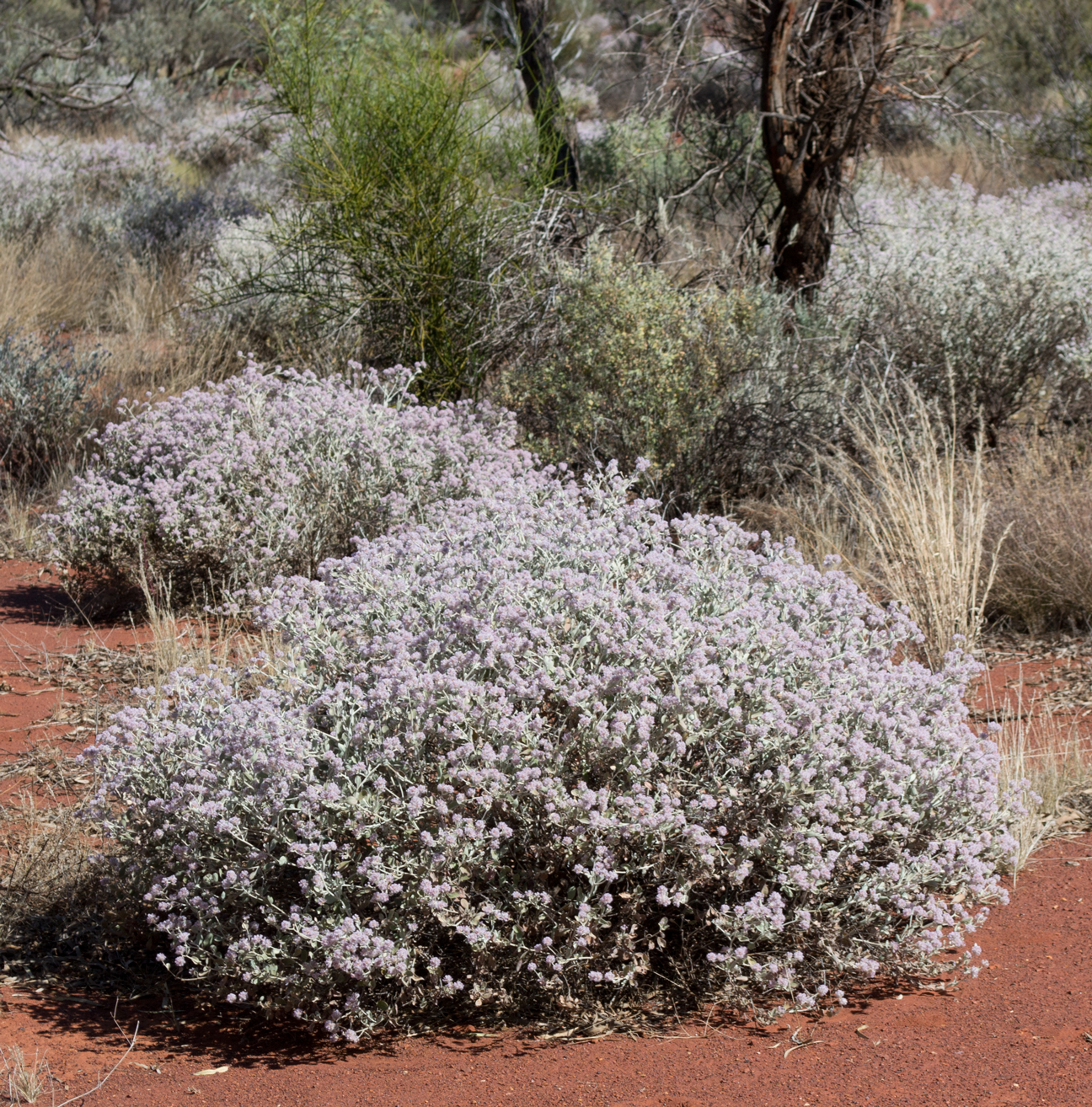
Habit

Ptilotus obovatus, commonly known as smoke bush, silver bush, silver tails or cotton bush, is a spreading or rounded, much-branched perennial shrub or subshrub of the family Amaranthaceae and is found in arid areas of all mainland states and the Northern Territory of Australia. Its stems and leaves are densely hairy, the leaves sessile and egg-shaped or elliptic, and the flowers arranged in short spikes with a hairy, pink or purplish perianth.

== Description ==
Ptilotus obovatus is a spreading or rounded, much-branched perennial shrub or subshrub that typically grows to a height of 1 m (3 ft 3 in), its stems and foliage densely covered with white, woolly hairs. Its leaves are arranged alternately, egg-shaped to elliptic, sometimes with the narrower end towards the base, 12–50 mm (0.47–1.97 in) long and 4–17 mm (0.16–0.67 in) wide. The flowers are arranged in oblong to short-cylindrical spikes, 10–25 mm (0.39–0.98 in) long and 10–20 mm (0.39–0.79 in) wide, often near the ends of branches. The flowers have five hairy pink or purplish perianth segments 5–9 mm (0.20–0.35 in) long with a bract and two sepal-like bracteoles at the base. There are three or four stamens, including two or one staminode/s. Flowering occurs throughout the year, and the fruit is 1–2 mm (0.039–0.079 in) long and 0.5–1 mm (0.020–0.039 in) wide.

== Taxonomy ==
This species was first formally described in 1829 by Charles Gaudichaud-Beaupré who gave it the name Trichinium obovatum in Voyage autour du monde from specimens collected near Shark Bay. In 1868, Ferdinand von Mueller transferred the species to Ptilotus as P. obovatus in his Fragmenta Phytographiae Australiae. The specific epithet (obovatus) means 'inverted egg-shaped'.

The variety Ptilotus obovatus var. obovatus is recognised as a distinct taxon in Western Australia and the Northern Territory.

== Distribution and habitat ==
Smoke bush is widely distributed and common in Western Australia, South Australia, the Northern Territory, and Queensland but is rare and "endangered" in Victoria under that state's Flora and Fauna Guarantee Act 1988.
