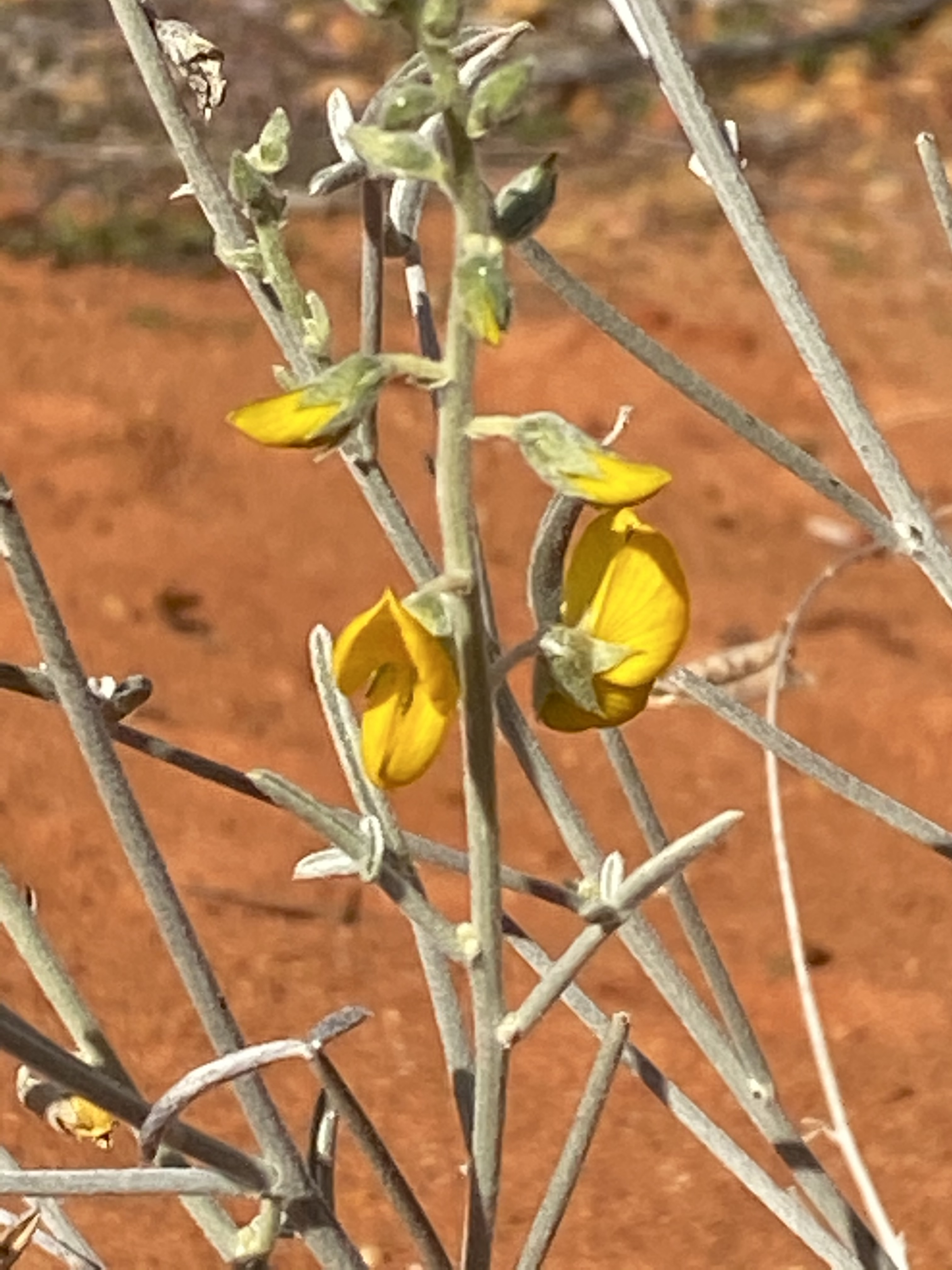

Scientific classification
- Kingdom: Plantae
- Clade: Tracheophytes
- Clade: Angiosperms
- Clade: Eudicots
- Clade: Rosids
- Order: Fabales
- Family: Fabaceae
- Subfamily: Faboideae
- Genus: Crotalaria
- Species: C. eremaea

Binomial name
- Crotalaria eremaea F.Muell.

Synonyms
- Crotalaria dissitiflora Benth.

= Crotalaria eremaea =

Species of legume

Crotalaria eremaea, also known as the bluebush pea or loose-flowered rattlepod, is a species of legume native to Australia and occurring in all mainland states and territories except for Victoria and the Australian Capital Territory.

== Description ==
Crotalaria eremaea grows as a perennial herb or softwooded shrub up to 2m tall. Stems are glabrous, tomentose or pubescent. Leaves are 1- or 3-foliate, with a larger terminal leaflet 10-80 mm long, and two smaller lateral leaflets less than 10 mm long or absent. Leaflets are pubescent and narrow-elliptic, oblong, or ovate, and are borne on petioles 18-45 mm long.

Flowers are borne on a terminal raceme 6-40 cm long, with 15-30 flowers on each. Calyx is pubescent and around 5 mm long. Corolla is bright yellow and 10-20 mm long. Pods are narrow-obovate, 15-30 mm long, and contain yellow seeds around 3.5 mm long.

Crotalaria eremaea grows in sandy soils across most of the inland of Australia.

== Taxonomy ==
Crotalaria eremaea was first described by Ferdinand von Mueller from a specimen collected by Augustus Charles Gregory near 'Cooper's River and its tributaries'.

Two subspecies are currently accepted:

- Crotalaria eremaea F.Muell. subsp. eremaea
- Crotalaria eremaea subsp. strehlowii (E.Pritz.) A.T.Lee
