= Port of Newhaven =

Port in East Sussex, England

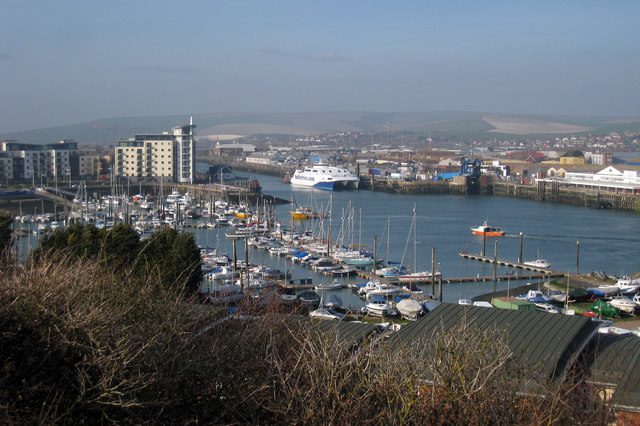
- View of Newhaven marina and ferry port
- Interactive map of Port of Newhaven

Location
- Country: England
- Location: Newhaven, East Sussex
- Coordinates: 50.78961°N 0.05437°E

Details
- Opened: 1847
- Operated by: Newhaven Port & Properties Limited
- Owned by: Department of Seine-Maritime, France
- Type of Harbor: Natural/Artificial with Marina

Statistics
- Website www.newhavenportauthority.co.uk

The Port of Newhaven is a port and associated docks complex located within Newhaven, East Sussex, England, situated at the mouth of the River Ouse.

International ferries run to the French port of Dieppe, Seine-Maritime, a distance of 75.5 miles (122 km). The harbour still sees a great deal of freight and passengers movement. There are signs of the historic railway operations.

The port is served by Newhaven Harbour railway station.

== History ==
The fishing village of Newhaven was of little maritime importance until the opening of the railway line from Lewes to Newhaven in 1847.

=== Seaford branch ===
From 1864, under instruction from the London, Brighton & South Coast Railway (LB&SCR) which had acquired lands around the then fishing village, their Chief Engineer Frederick Banister was instructed to design a new commercial-scale port facility and transport access system.

In 1864, Banister enabled the construction of the Seaford branch line from Newhaven town to Newhaven Harbour, on the east side of the river and onwards to Seaford. This would later allow the bulk transport and supply of building materials to enable construction of the docks at Newhaven.

=== LB&SCR passenger ferry services ===
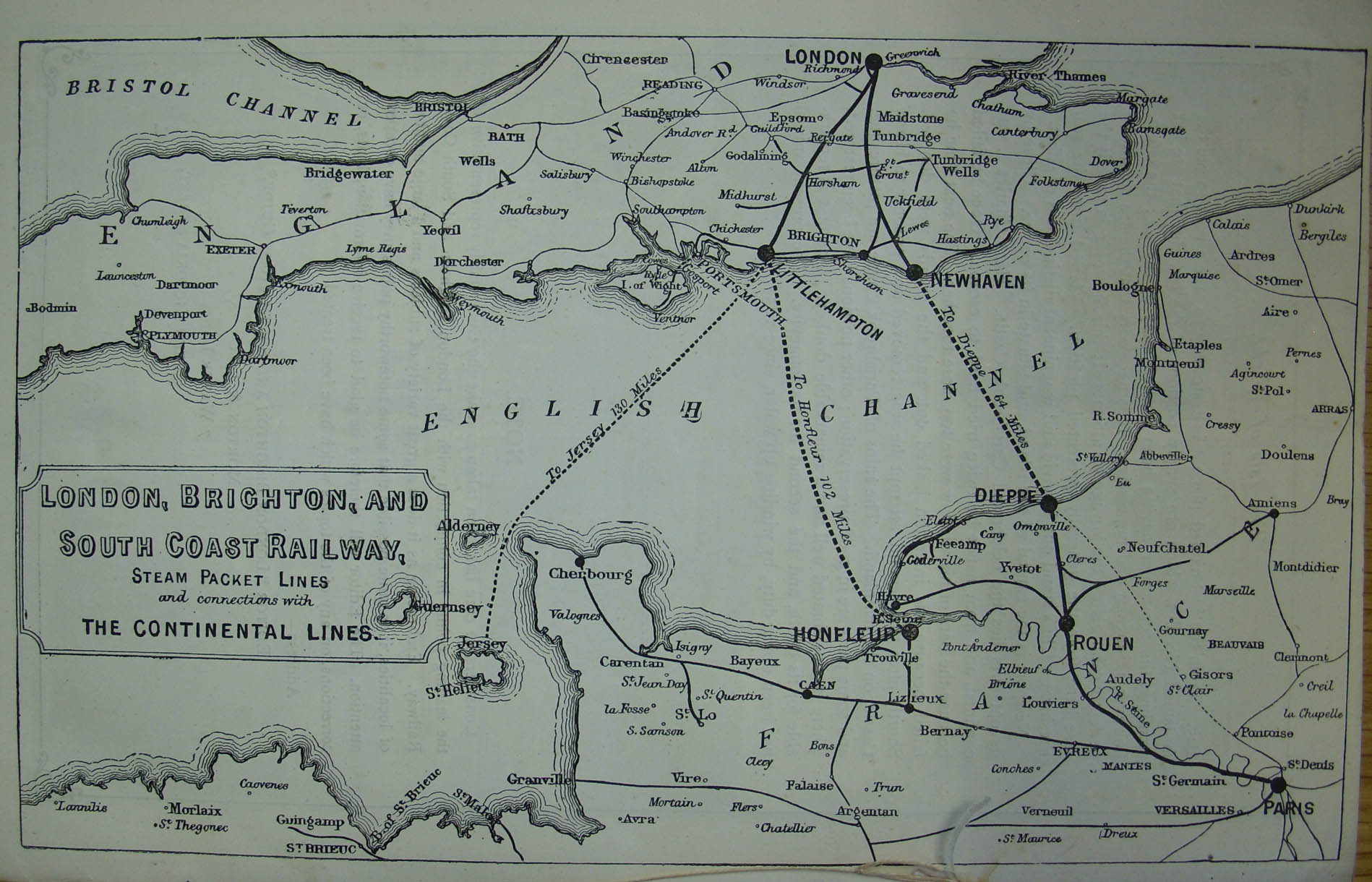
A map showing the main LB&SCR ferry routes in 1888

Until this point, cross-channel passenger services from London to Paris, had mainly operated from Brighton using the 1820 completed Chain Pier, and secondly from Shoreham. However, both of these ports severely restricted the size of accessible vessels, and hence volume and profit from a commercial passenger operation.

With the opening of the Seaford branchline and the completion of the new docks facility, the LB&SCR funded the dredging of the harbour's channel, and other associated improvements between 1850 and 1878. The railway company also built three new mahogany-hulled paddle steamers, called Newhaven, Brighton and Dieppe. Powered by oscillating engines, they were to make fast runs from the new harbour to Dieppe.

Civil unrest in France and its revolution of 1848 dogged the early years of the service. In fact, the last King of France, Louis Philippe I and his Queen, used the port in 1848 to make their flight into exile, staying overnight at the Bridge Hotel in Bridge Street before travelling onwards to London the next day.

Although the Newhaven–Dieppe service was discontinued soon after its establishment, in 1850 the railway company established a Newhaven–Jersey ferry service. In 1853 it re-instated the Dieppe service, which flourished because it provided the claimed shortest land and sea route between London and Paris. By this time the LB&SCR had built both a new passenger terminal, and the imposing London and Paris Hotel to enable the increased activity.

The London, Brighton and South Coast Railway (New Lines) Act 1862 (25 & 26 Vict. c. lxviii) gave the LB&SCR power to own and operate its own steam vessels. In 1863 the company's French partner Chemins de Fer de l'Ouest agreed to operate the Newhaven–Dieppe passenger service jointly. Although advertised as the "shortest and cheapest" route to Paris, it was never the quickest because of the much longer time taken at sea than the rival Dover to Calais route.

=== 1878 expansion ===
Due to expanding cross-channel services and shortage of quay capacity at Newhaven, in 1863 the LB&SCR transferred the Jersey service to Littlehampton, and soon afterwards established the Littlehampton-Honfleur service.

In the light of increased passenger and commercial activity, and with increased competition from the Port of Dover, the LB&SCR instructed Banister to expand the port greatly. After guiding the required approvals through the UK parliament, Banister personally managed the civil engineering works for the new docks in 1878, without the use of contractors, including:

- The provision of new and additional quays
- The construction of new sea-walls
- New entrance piers and lighthouses
- The building of a concrete breakwater, extending seawards for 800 yards (730 m)

The resultant works created through reclamation several new acres of land which were subsequently developed and then sub-leased to various industrial companies.

=== Peak operations: 1880s-1930s ===
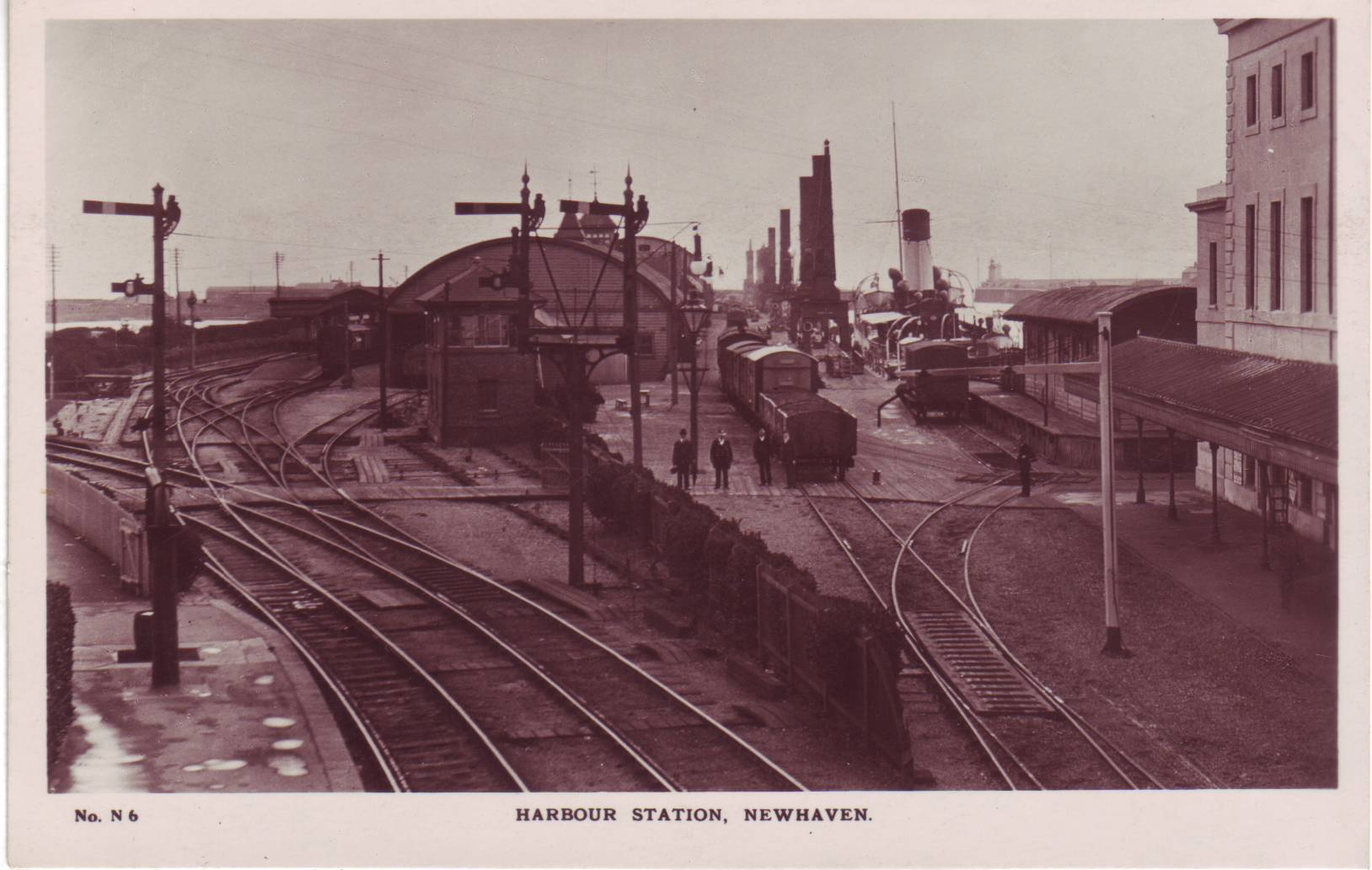
A view of Newhaven Harbour railway station, taken sometime in the early 1900s

The village of Newhaven greatly expanded on the back of the works to a town, as they allowed a large increase in both trade and subsequently population. Imports included French farm products and manufactures, timber, granite and slates.

The harbour was officially recognised as The Port of Newhaven in 1882.

=== Southern Railway: 1923-1948 ===
As a result of the Railways Act 1921, in January 1923 the LB&SCR was merged with its local rivals to form the Southern Railway (SR). In addition to inheriting railway operations, the SR also gained several important South Coast of England port and harbour facilities, all constructed at least in part for handling ocean-going and cross-channel passenger traffic. These included Newhaven, Folkestone and the larger Port of Southampton. The SR also ran railways services to the harbours at Portsmouth, Dover and Plymouth. This source of regular passenger traffic, together with the density of population served in the London suburbs, ensured that the SR was a predominantly passenger-orientated railway.

=== Use during the two World Wars ===
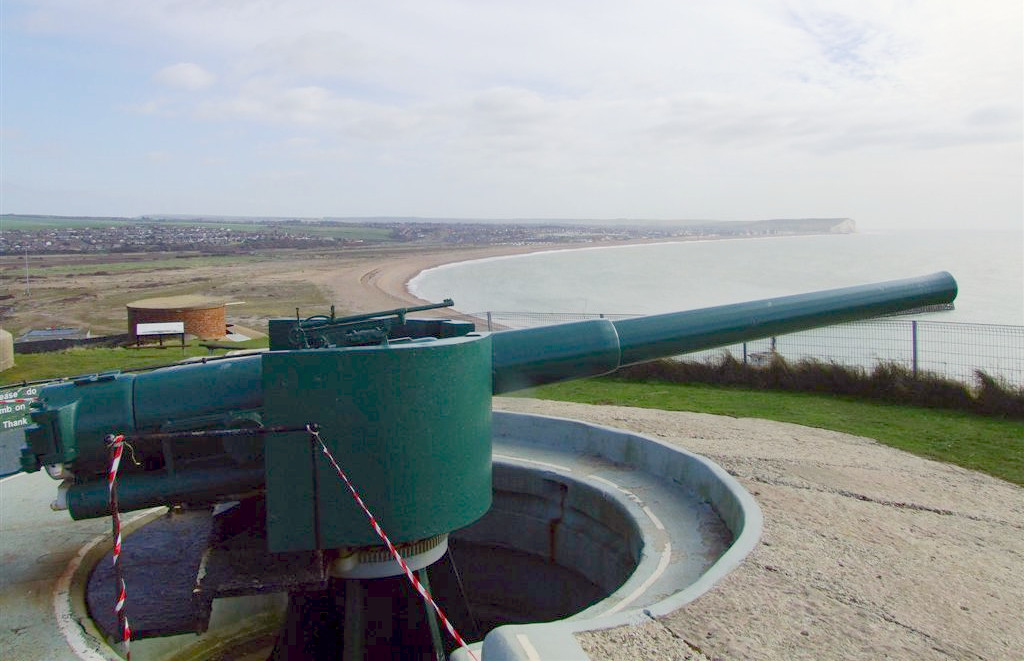
Newhaven fort

Newhaven was designated as one of the principal ports for the movement of men and materiel to the European continent during World War I, and was taken over by the military authorities and the ferries requisitioned for the duration of the war. Between 22 September 1916 and 2 December 1918, the port and town of Newhaven were designated a 'Special Military Area' under the 'Defence of the Realm Regulations', and the Harbour station was closed to the public. The port and harbour facilities, rail sidings and warehousing were greatly enlarged at this time and electric lighting installed to allow for 24-hour operation. Some 17,000 crossings of the Channel took place and over six million tons of supplies were carried to the French coastal ports. Eleven of the ships were lost to enemy attacks from mines, submarines, aeroplanes or "torpedo boat-destroyers" and about a hundred of the seamen, who had become well known to the local townspeople, were killed. Many survivors of the ships were brought back to the port.

During World War II Newhaven was one of the few ports within the proposed landing area of the German invasion plans for Operation Sea Lion. The Germans targetted the port and additional guns and fortifications were added in 1940. Large numbers of Canadian troops were stationed at Newhaven, and the ill-fated Dieppe Raid in 1942 was largely launched from the harbour. In 1944, Newhaven was an important embarkation port for the D-Day landings. At any one time, the port could handle four medium coasters, 3 LCT, 1 LCI and 1,800 troops per embarkation and 19 vessels per 24 hours.

=== 1950s-2000s ===
The freight traffic of the port has always been supplemental to the passenger traffic, but was key in keeping the port operational post-World War II. Initially reliant on coal in the Victorian era, the port was redeveloped in 1938 by filling in basins and leaving a straight frontage along the River Ouse.

With post-WW2 freight traffic dropping, the council wished to improve the nearby A259 road which crossed by the railway on a narrow bridge, restricting traffic flow for both the road and rail. In 1968 the goods sidings access was removed from Newhaven Harbour railway station, resulting in the closure of the local coal yard and that traffic source.

In 1981, the old railway wharf began to be used for aggregates import and export and the production of concrete until that ceased in 1996. Much of the derelict port facilities have since been used for scrap storage and processing, while redevelopment is debated between the owners and local residents.

By late 1981, the Sealink Newhaven-Dieppe ferry service run by British Rail and SNCF was making a significant loss overall despite the presence on the route of profit generating British ship Senlac. The two French ships on the route (Villandry and Valencay) were considerably smaller, built in the 1960s and required major improvements, the English partners therefore were keen for the French ships to be replaced and a more balanced revenue-sharing agreement, revised from the existing two thirds/one third arrangement favouring the French,ideally on a equal share basis. After announcing a strike-inducing withdrawal in January 1982, agreement was reached to retain the service a few weeks later. Following sustained losses on the route for 1983, new owners of Sealink British Ferries; Sea Containers formally announced their intention in June 1984 to withdraw from the route, leaving it solely to the French operator from 1985.

In 1992, SNAT announced plans to close their Newhaven to Dieppe ferry service, which they had operated since the withdrawal of Sealink. Sally Line were rumoured to be on the verge of launching their own service, but ultimately lost out to Stena Line who stepped in to operate the service. The Newhaven to Dieppe route was included in the merger of certain Stena operations with P&O European Ferries in 1998 to become part of P&O Stena Line.

P&O Stena Line would later decided to concentrate on their primary Dover - Calais services, with the last vessel on the Newhaven - Dieppe route; Stena Cambria, undertaking her last sailing on 31 January 1999. A high speed passenger service was instituted by Hoverspeed using SuperSeaCat Two in April 1999.

=== 2000s onwards ===
Despite the Hoverspeed passenger service (which would close in 2005), a conventional passenger-vehicle freight service was desired for the Dieppe - Newhaven route. Transmanche Ferries a new subsidised company was thus formed in April 2001 by a group of public bodies, including the General Council of Seine-Maritime, the towns of Dieppe and Fécamp as well as three Chambers of Commerce.

After five years of successful service and the arrival of two newbuild ships, the government decided to tender the line in a paid-for concession. One of five companies invited to tender for the operation of the service, LD Lines was awarded the contract on 21 December 2006, receiving an annual subsidy of up to €14.6 million. LD Lines commenced sailings on the route on 1 May 2007, although the fleet remained in their original Transmanche Ferries livery. In addition to three round trips between Dieppe and Newhaven, LD Lines started a single round trip per day between Le Havre and Newhaven during high season using the MS Seven Sisters. However, in August 2008 they announced that this service would not be continued.

In 2012 LD Lines and DFDS started a joint service which was soon to be brought under the name of New Channel Company A/S, known as DFDS Seaways France, and included Transmanche Ferries. In 2013 LD Lines was subsumed into DFDS, who in 2014 reached an agreement with Seine-Maritime to continue running the service. This agreement has been renewed on a rolling basis, most recently in Oct 2022 until October 2027.

In 2020, East Sussex County Council commissioned the building of a new relief road to the port to reduce traffic congestion in residential areas.

== Present ==
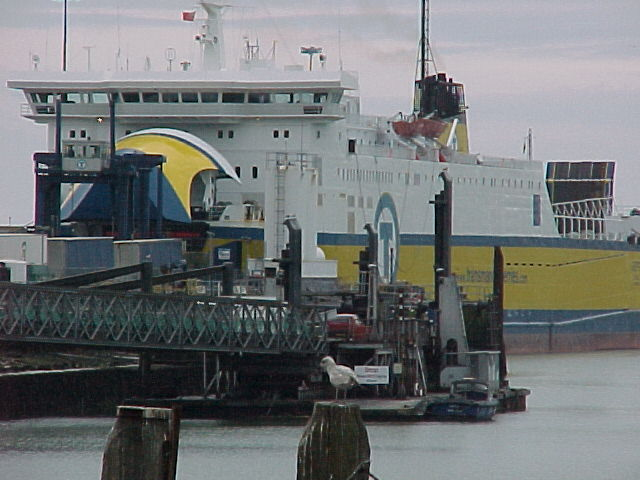
Transmanche Ferries ro-ro ship MS Dieppe, unloading at Newhaven having arrived from Dieppe, Seine-Maritime, France

Although there are some signs of the derelict facilities at Newhaven Marine Railway Station, the port still sees a great deal of freight and passenger movement.

=== Passenger ferries ===
International ferries run to the French port of Dieppe. Currently there are two sailings per day in low season and three in the summer, using the 18,654 GT ro-ro MS Seven Sisters and her sister ship MS Côte D'Albâtre. Rail passengers wishing to connect with the ferries are advised nationally to travel to Newhaven Town and walk to the adjacent ferry terminal; this has resulted in a dramatic fall in passenger services at Newhaven Harbour, leading to questions about its future.

The winter service continues to consist of two sailings each way most days, increased to three between May and the end of September. In the high-summer of 2023 the company will operate four crossings a day at weekends, the highest level of service in three decades.

=== Industrial operations ===
In 2011, Sussex Yachts Limited initiated a scheme to regenerate the East Quay with their yacht refit business, opening Newhaven Boatyard the largest marine refit facility in the South East. The project expanded into commercial vessel maintenance and refit in 2012.

The port is the proposed main land base for E.ON's development of the offshore Rampion Wind Farm.

== Port Police ==
The British Transport Police were based at Newhaven until 1984 when the port was privatised. For several years officers from Sussex Police Special Branch and the Metropolitan Police Special Branch were based at the port.

The Port Authority has the power to establish and employ its own police under the Newhaven Harbour Revision Order 2016. This would be on the same basis as the Port of Dover Police.

== Lifeboat ==
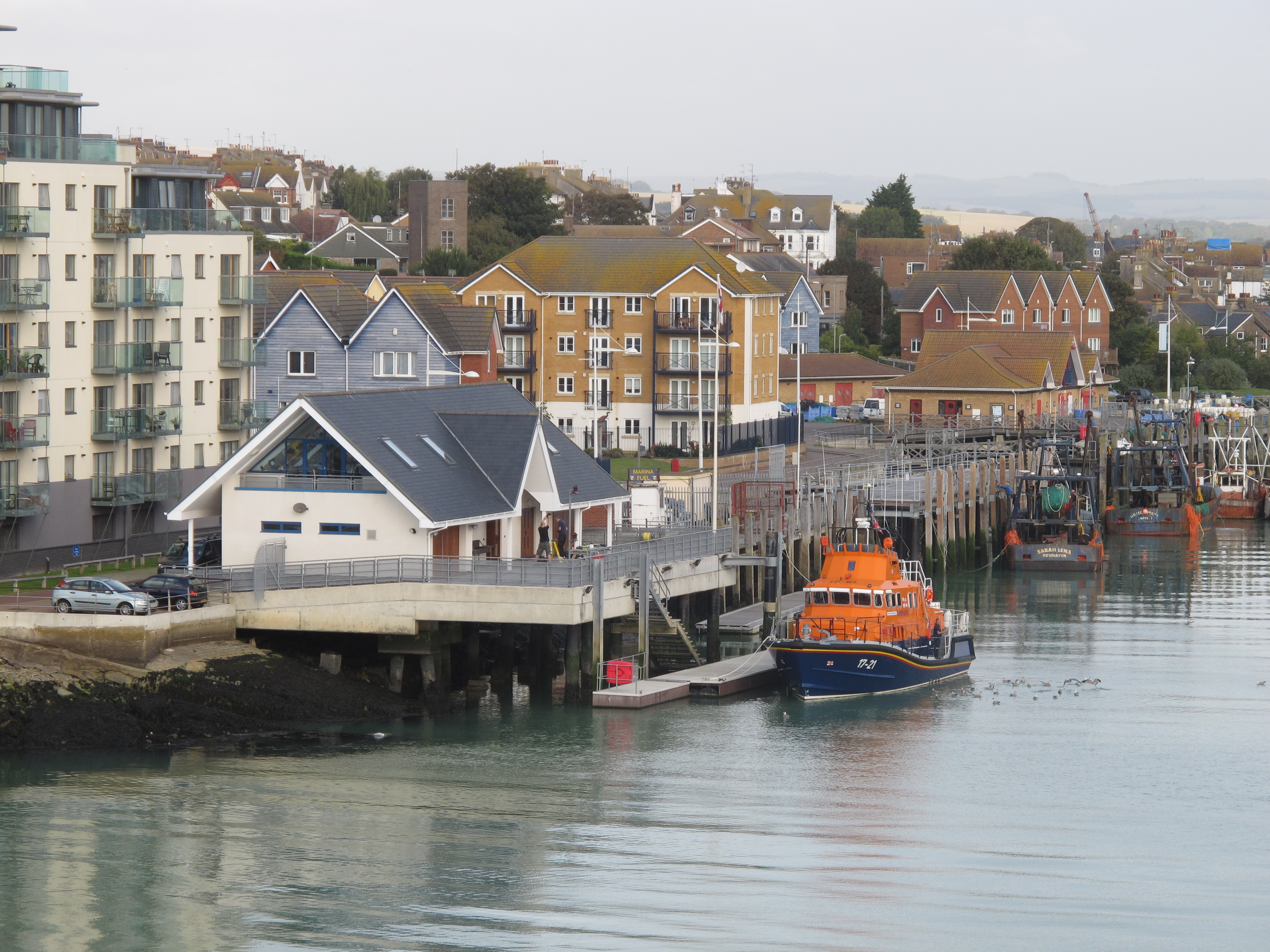
The current Newhaven lifeboat, RNLB David and Elizabeth Acland a Severn class lifeboat, on station at Newhaven

The Newhaven Lifeboat, the first of which was commissioned in 1803, is among the oldest in Britain, and was established some 20 years before the Royal National Lifeboat Institution. The town established the rescue lifeboat in response to the wreck of HMS Brazen in January 1800 when only one man of her crew of some 105 men could be saved. The town used a combination of funds raised locally and contributed by Lloyd's of London to purchase a lifeboat built to Henry Greathead's "Original" design. Newhaven also has one of the Watch stations of the National Coastwatch Institution. The current boat, RNLB David and Elizabeth Acland, is a Severn class lifeboat. David Acland CBE,DL, was a member of the RNLI's Committee of Management for 34 years and its Chairman from 1996 to 2000.
