= NVH =

NVH may refer to:

- Newhaven Harbour railway station, Sussex, England
- Noise, vibration, and harshness, in vehicles
- Norwegian School of Veterinary Science, Oslo, Norway
- NVH-1 and NVH-4, proposed variants of the Type 85 AFV armoured vehicle

== See also ==
- NVHS (disambiguation)
- NUH (disambiguation)
- MVH (disambiguation)
