= Southease railway station =

Railway station in East Sussex, England

Coordinates: 50°49′50″N 0°1′50″E

Southease
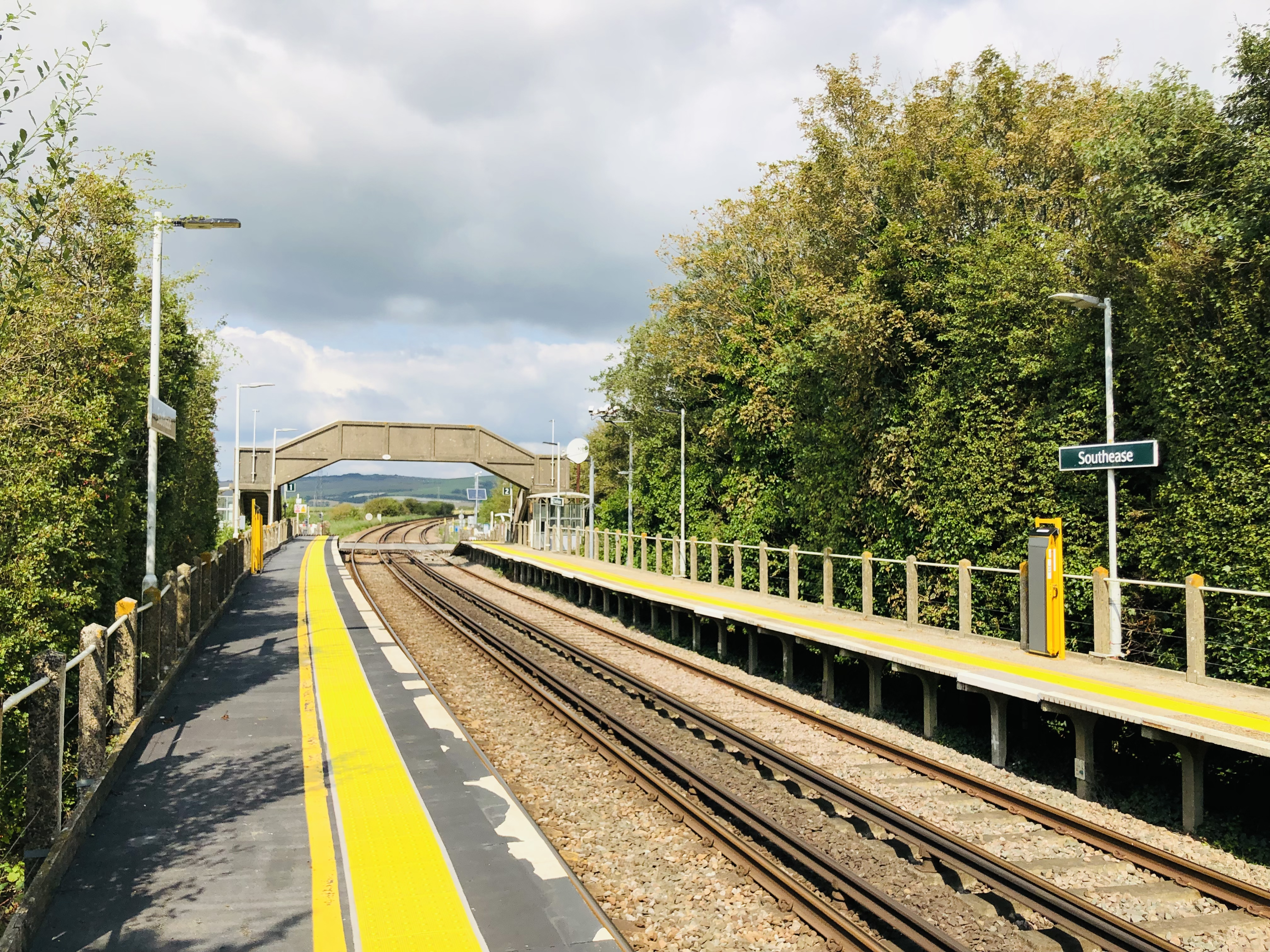
- The platforms at Southease, looking north

General information
- Location: Southease, Lewes; England
- Grid reference: TQ430054
- Manager: Southern
- Platforms: 2

Other information
- Station code: SEE
- Classification: DfT category F2

History
- Pre-grouping: LB&SCR
- Post-grouping: Southern Railway

Key dates
- 1 September 1906: Opened as Southease and Rodmell Halt
- 12 May 1980: Renamed Southease

Passengers
- 2021/22: ▲23,564
- 2022/23: ▼23,206
- 2023/24: ▲25,064
- 2024/25: ▲27,332
- 2025/26: ▲31,000
Location
Notes
- Passenger statistics from the Office of Rail and Road

Southease railway station is located 1/2 mile (800 m) east of the village of Southease in East Sussex, England. It is on the Seaford branch of the East Coastway Line, 53 miles 40 chains (86.1 km) measured from London Bridge via Redhill. The station is surrounded by agricultural land. The South Downs Way crosses the Seaford Branch here.

== History ==
The London, Brighton and South Coast Railway opened the station on 1 September 1906 as Southease and Rodmell Halt, to serve two villages in the Ouse Valley; Southease, 1/2 mile (800 m) to the west, and the slightly larger Rodmell, more than 1 mile (1.6 km) away. The station was renamed Southease on 12 May 1980.

There was a racecourse between the railway line and the River Ouse from the late 1920s to the early 1940s.

== Infrastructure ==
The station is unstaffed and has two platforms, each with a PERTIS machine. A self-service ticket machine was also installed in 2016. There is a level crossing immediately north of the station leading to Itford Farm and the A26 road. The crossing is a user-controlled crossing with barriers which can be raised or lowered by road users. There is a pedestrian gate for walkers and cyclists. There is also a footbridge over the line.

== Services ==
All services at Southease are operated by Southern using Class 377 EMUs.

The typical off-peak service in trains per hour is:

- 1 tph to Brighton via Lewes
- 1 tph to Seaford

Connections with services to Gatwick Airport and London Victoria can be made by changing at Lewes.

Preceding station	National Rail	Following station
Lewes	Southern Seaford Branch Line	Newhaven Town

== Gallery ==
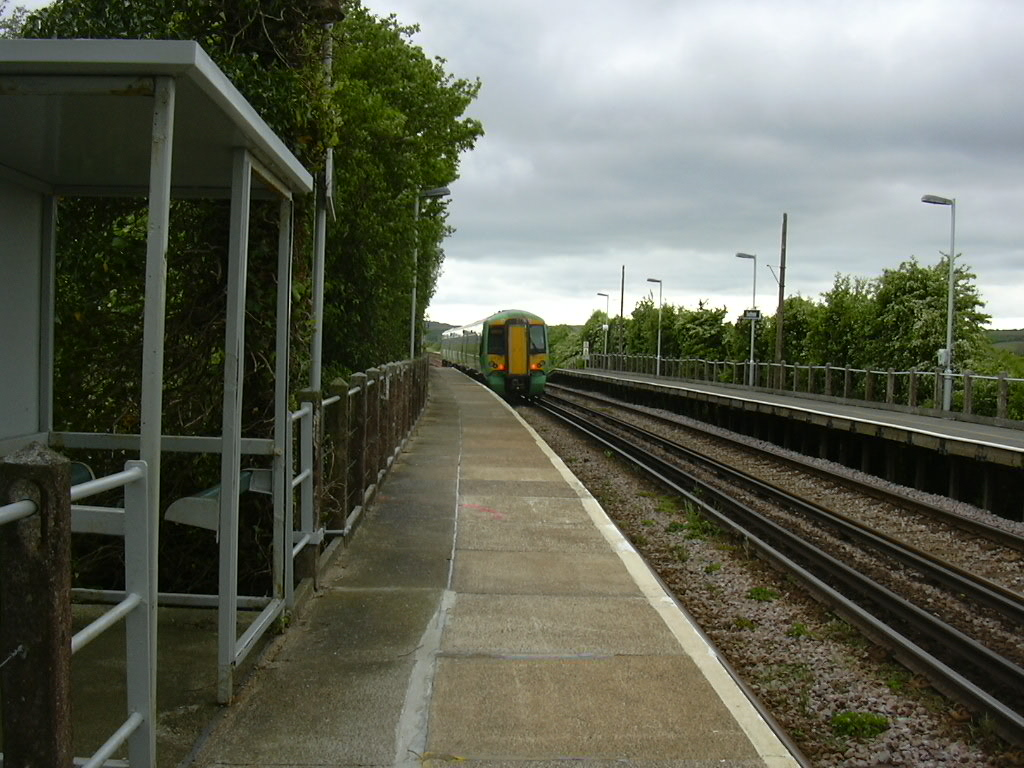
The southbound platform

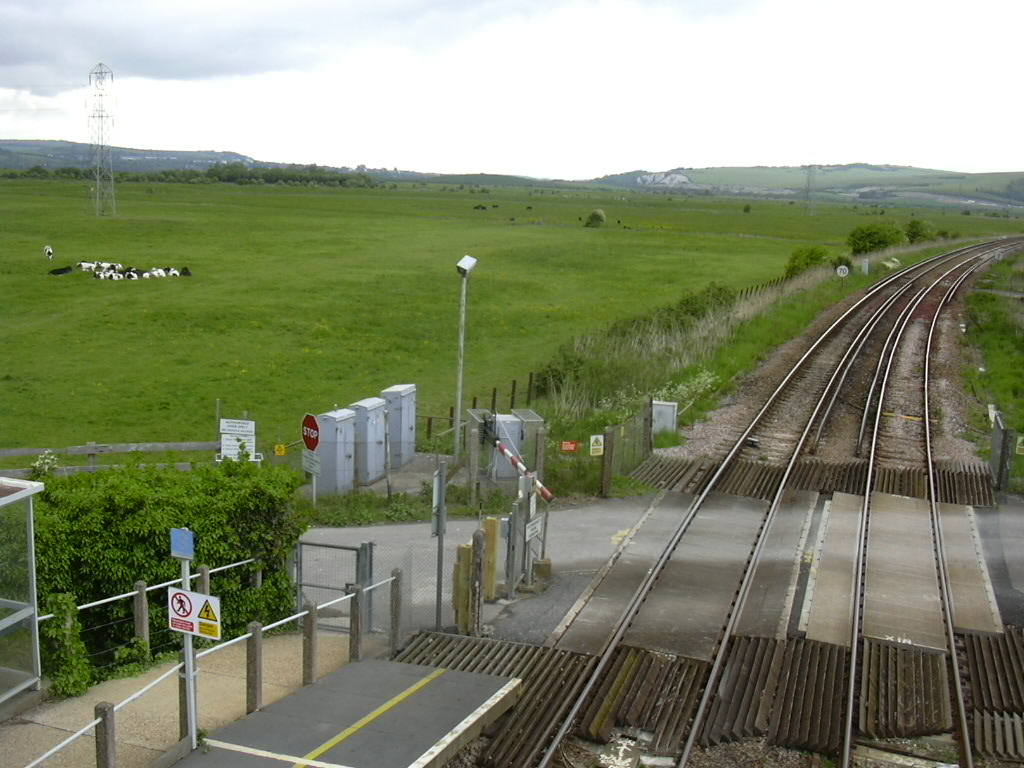
Looking north from the footbridge

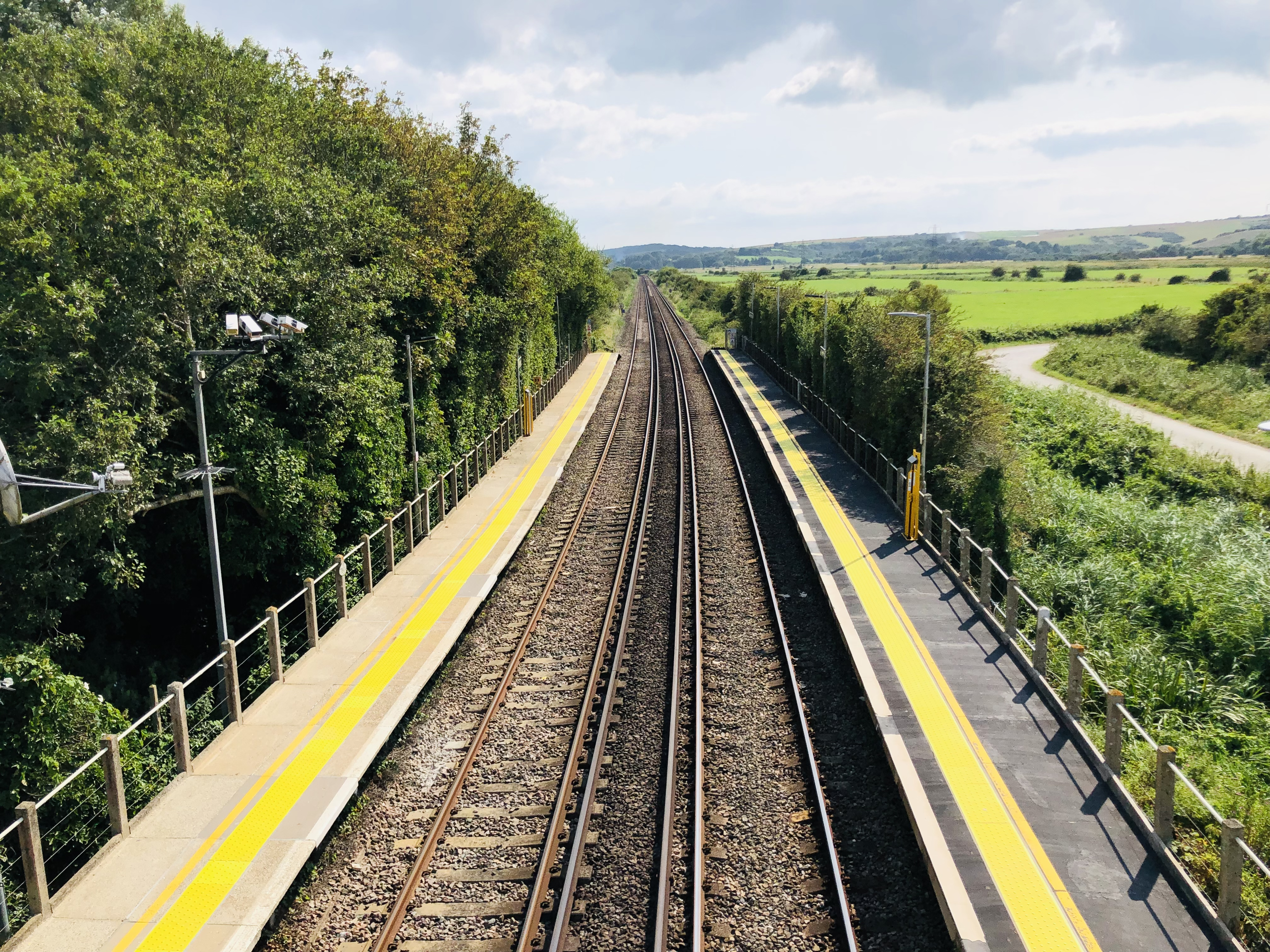
The platforms, looking south
