= Newhaven Town railway station =

Railway station in East Sussex, England

Coordinates: 50.795°N 0.055°E

Newhaven Town
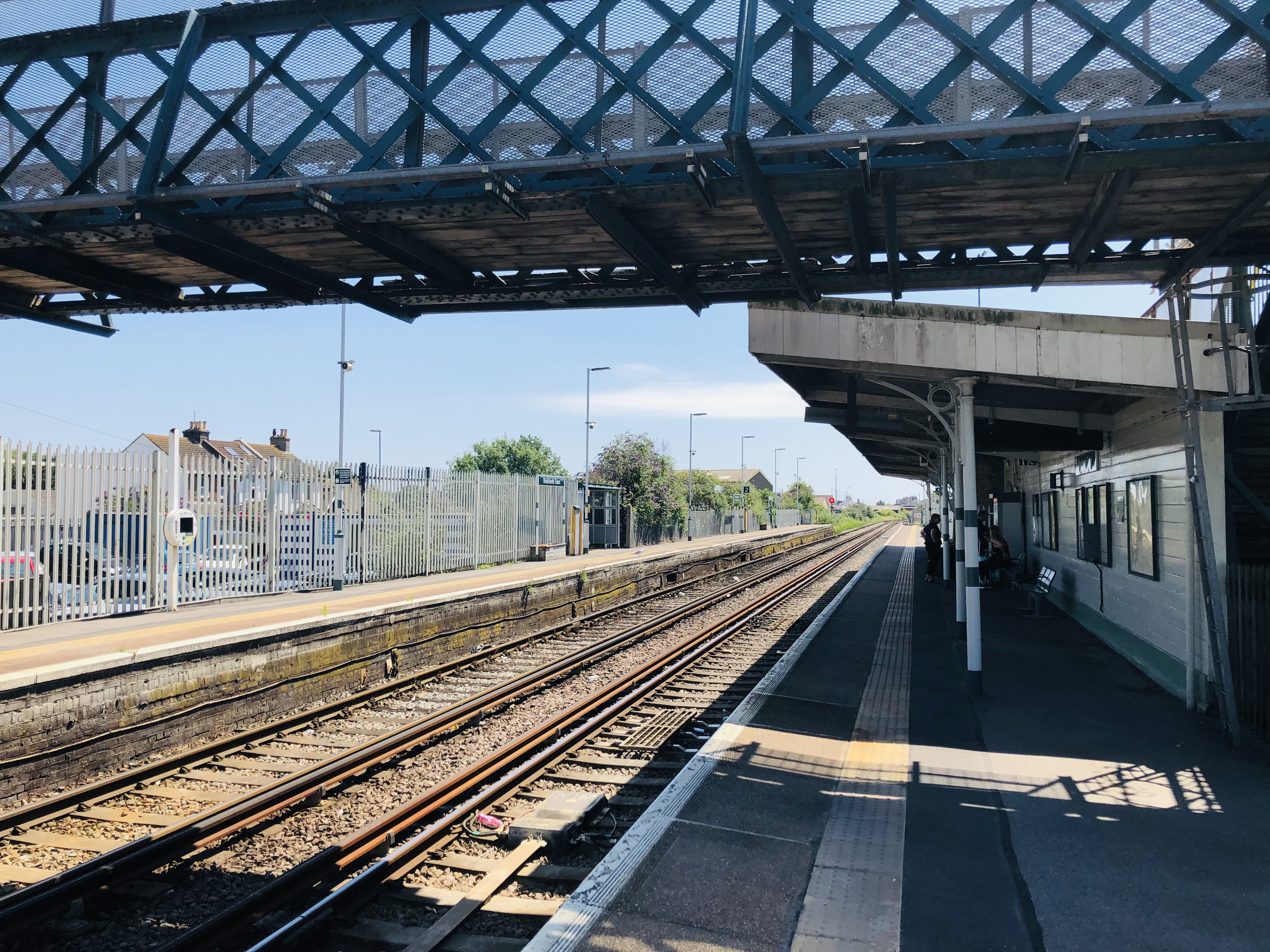

General information
- Location: Newhaven, Lewes; England
- Grid reference: TQ449014
- Manager: Southern
- Platforms: 2

Other information
- Station code: NVN
- Classification: DfT category E

History
- Opened: 8 December 1847
- Pre-grouping: LB&SCR
- Post-grouping: Southern Railway

Passengers
- 2020/21: ▼0.123 million
- 2021/22: ▲0.284 million
- 2022/23: ▲0.319 million
- 2023/24: ▲0.364 million
- 2024/25: ▲0.431 million
Location
Notes
- Passenger statistics from the Office of Rail and Road

Newhaven Town railway station is the main station serving Newhaven, East Sussex, England, the other being Newhaven Harbour. A third station, Newhaven Marine, formally closed in October 2020, but had not had a train service since 2006.

The station has two platforms, both with Permit to Travel Machines and trains are operated by Southern. It is on the Seaford Branch of the East Coastway Line, 56 miles 25 chains (90.6 km) measured from London Bridge.

The station is adjacent to the passenger terminal for the Port of Newhaven which has regular ferry sailings to Dieppe in France. Foot passengers should alight here and not at Newhaven Harbour railway station, which is for the harbour industrial estate and freight terminal.

== Services ==
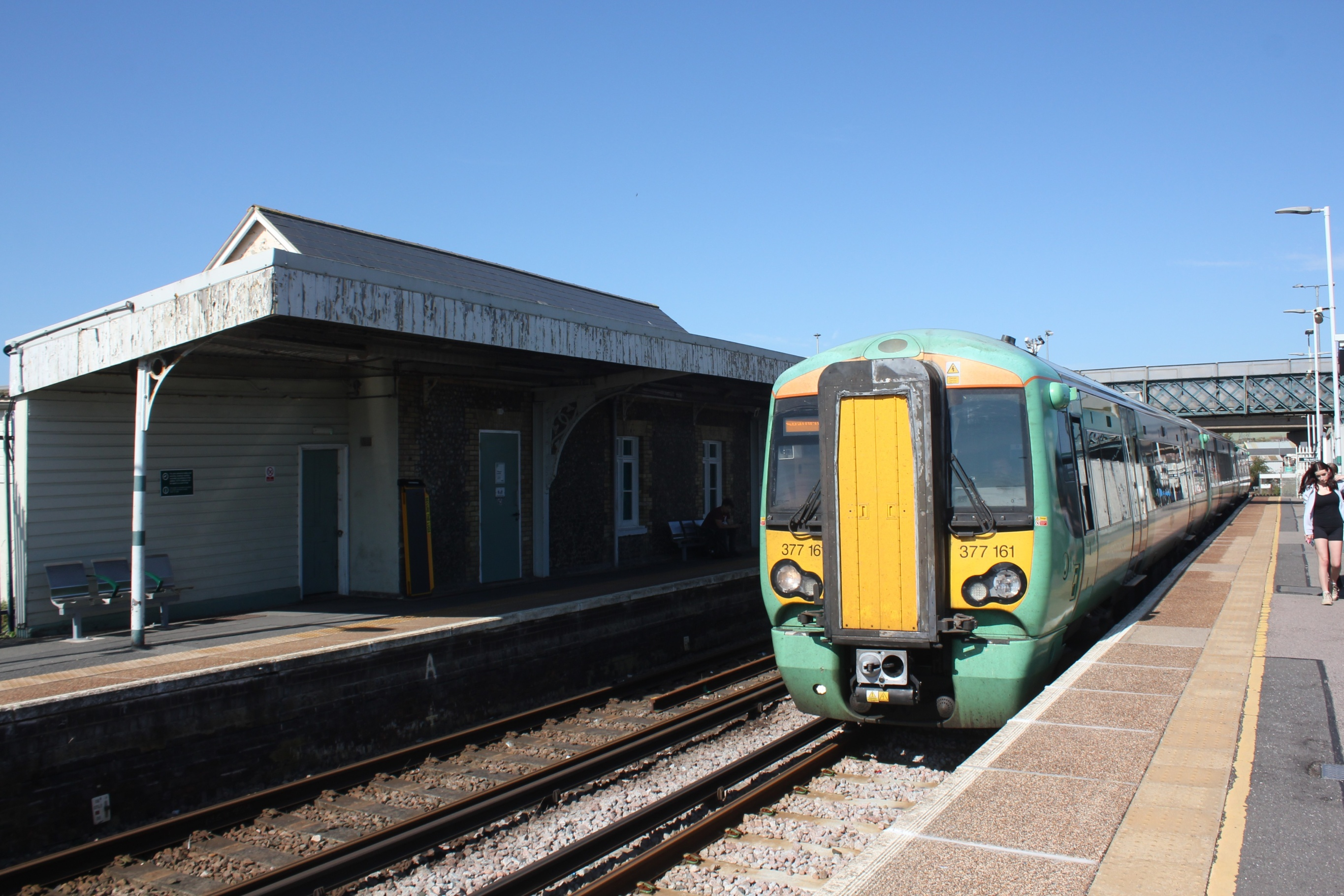
A Class 377 at Newhaven Town with a Southern service to Seaford

All services at Newhaven Town are operated by Southern using Class 377 EMUs.

The typical off-peak service in trains per hour is:

- 2 tph to Brighton via Lewes
- 2 tph to Seaford

Connections with services to Gatwick Airport and London Victoria can be made by changing at Lewes.

Preceding station	National Rail	Following station
Southease or Lewes	Southern Seaford Branch Line	Newhaven Harbour or Bishopstone
	Ferry services	
Dieppe	DFDS Seaways ferry	Terminus

== Motive power depot ==
The London Brighton and South Coast Railway opened an engine shed at the station in 1877. British Railways closed it in 1963 and the building is now a private workshop.

== Gallery ==
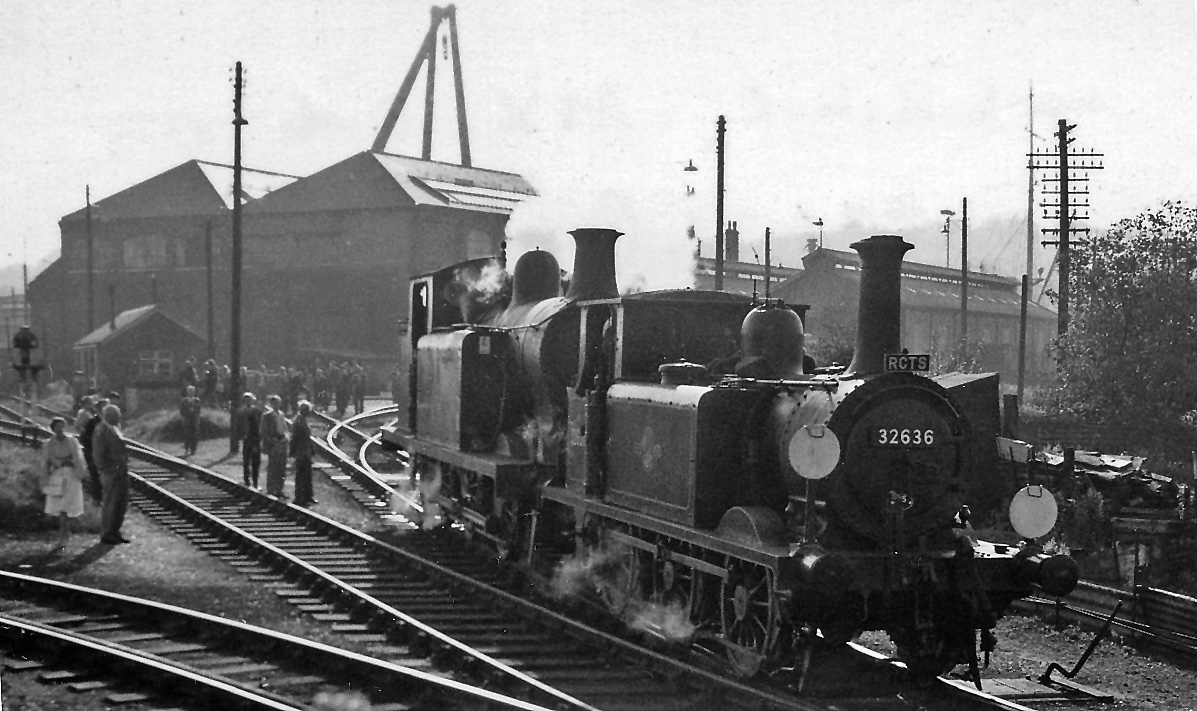
Newhaven Locomotive Depot 7 October 1962

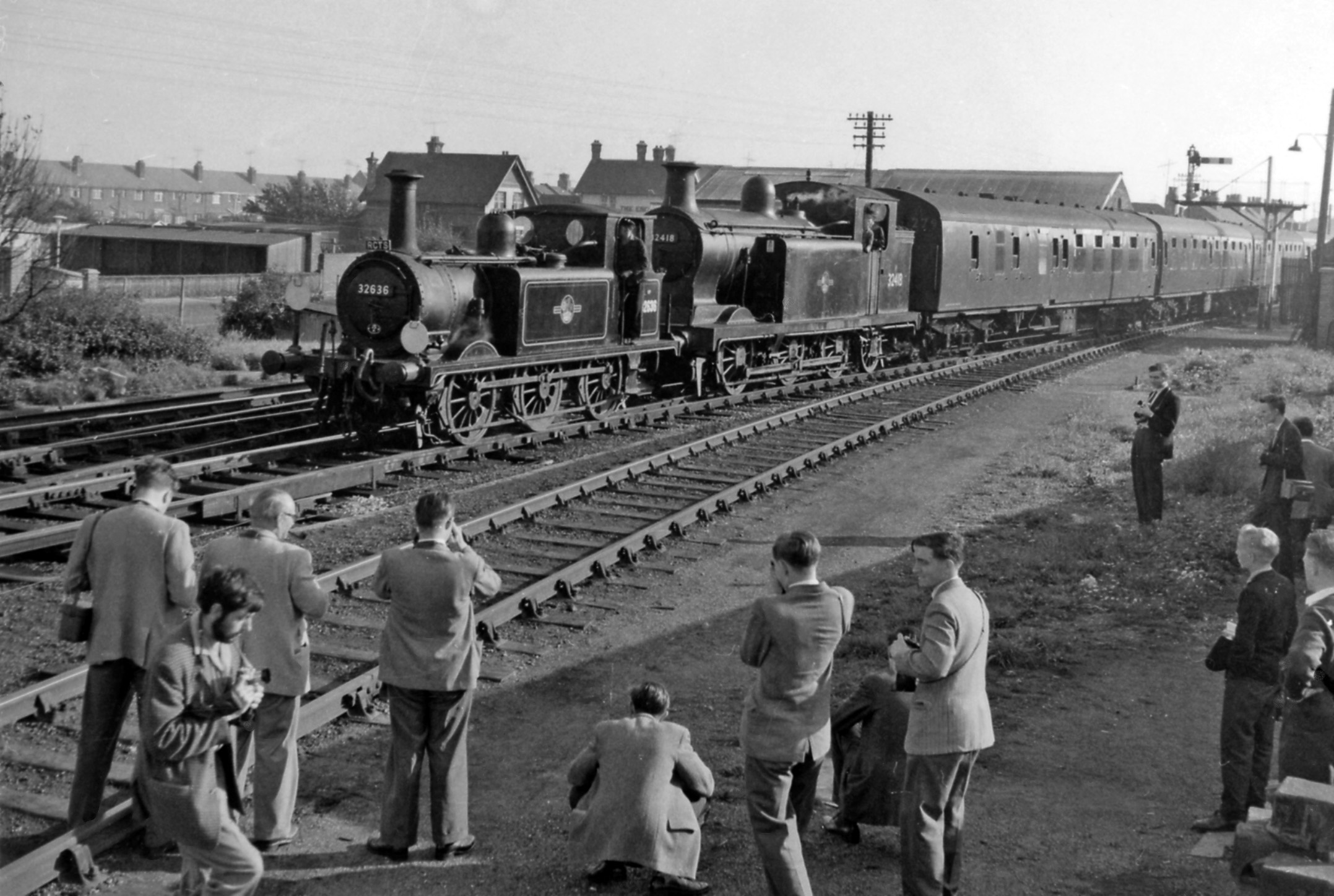
RCTS Sussex rail tour in 1962
