= Denton, East Sussex =

Village in East Sussex, England

Coordinates: 50.8025°N 0.05885°E

Denton
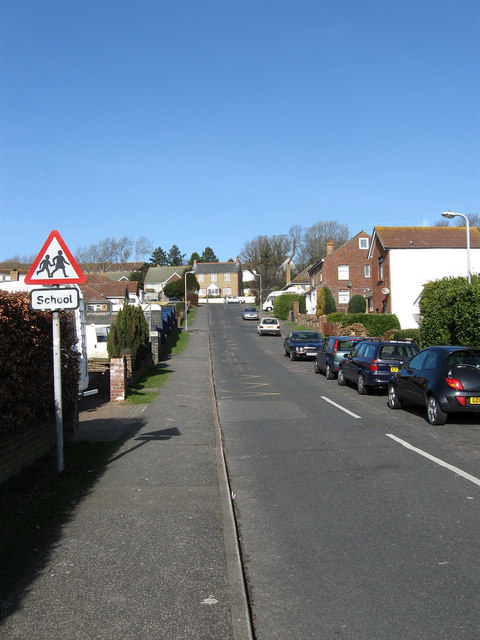
- Acacia Road

- Location within East Sussex
- OS grid reference: TQ451023
  - London: 49 miles (79 km) N
- Civil parish: Newhaven
- District: Lewes
- Shire county: East Sussex
- Region: South East
- Country: England
- Sovereign state: United Kingdom
- Post town: NEWHAVEN
- Postcode district: BN9
- Dialling code: 01273
- Police: Sussex
- Fire: East Sussex
- Ambulance: South East Coast
- UK Parliament: Lewes

Denton is a small village in the civil parish of Newhaven, in the Lewes district, in the county of East Sussex, England. It adjoins the village of South Heighton and Mount Pleasant and backs onto the South Downs.

== History ==
The Manor of Denton was held in Saxon times by Earl Godwin, father of King Harold II Godwinson. It seems likely that Denton was destroyed during the Saxon rebellion of 1068. It does not appear in the Domesday Book of 1086. The name Denton comes from Old English and means farmstead or village in a valley.

In 1894 the parish of Denton Urban was split from Denton. In 1931 the parish had a population of 568. On 1 April 1934 the parish was abolished and merged with Newhaven and South Heighton.

== Amenities ==
Denton's church, St. Leonard's, was first built around 1288, later extended and carefully restored during the Decorated Period. The walls are of flint and stone and the Vestry was added during the 20th century. The remains of what is thought to have been a priest's house in the west end of the churchyard, dating from about 1280, have recently been partly restored. The village has a junior school and one pub, the "Flying Fish" (originally named the "Kicking Donkey") which dates back to the 18th century.

== Denton Island ==
There is also a man-made island called Denton Island, in the middle of Newhaven Harbour, which featured a Toll Bridge which the residents of Denton village were exempt from paying.

== Residents ==
Ralph Reader who created the Gang Show for the Scout movement was from the village and the local Scout group is known as "The 2nd Denton & South Heighton (Ralph Reader's Own)".
