= Nuh =

Nuh may refer to:

- Nuh (city), Nuh district, Haryana, India
- Nuh district, Haryana
- Nuh Assembly constituency, a constituency of the Haryana Legislative Assembly in India
- Nūḥ, the 71st sura of the Qur'an

== People ==
- Nuh (name), list of people with this name
- Nuh (prophet), a prophet in the Qur'an, known as Noah in the Old Testament
- Nuh I of Samanid (died 954), amir of the Samanids
- Nuh II of Samanid (died 997), amir of the Samanids

== See also ==
- NUH (disambiguation)
