= Nuh (name) =

Nuh is a masculine given name. It is the Arabic form of Noah.

== Notable people with this name ==
- Nuh (prophet), a prophet in the Qur'an, also known as Noah
- Nuh I (died 954), amir of the Samanids
- Nuh II (died 997), amir of the Samanids
- Nuh Ha Mim Keller (born 1954), American Muslim translator of Islamic books
- Nuh ibn Asad (died circa 841), Samanid ruler of Samarkand

== See also ==
- Mohammad Nuh (born 1959), Indonesian government official
- Nuh (disambiguation)
