= Newhaven Harbour railway station =

Railway station in East Sussex, England

Coordinates: 50.790°N 0.055°E

Newhaven Harbour
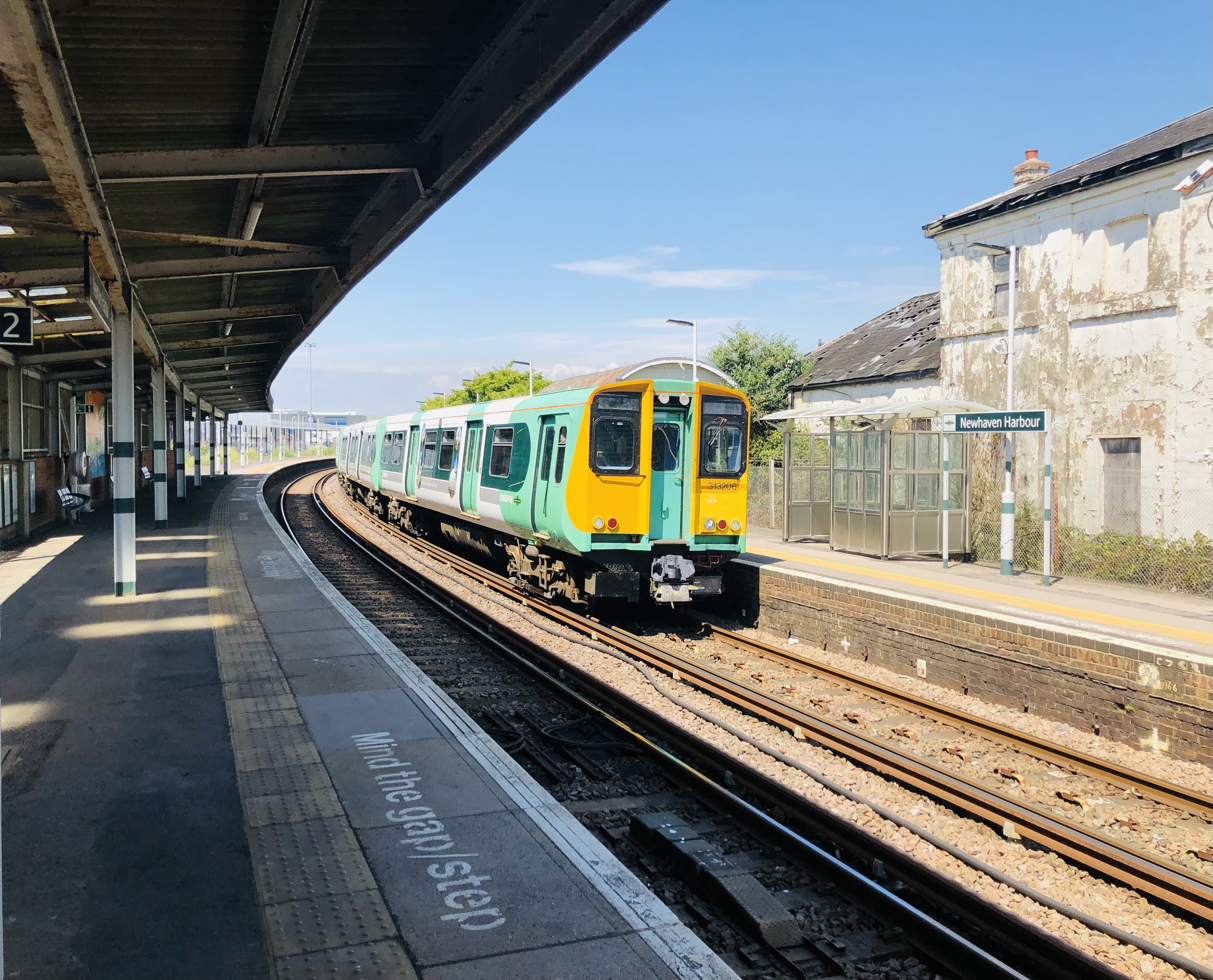
- 313206 at Newhaven Harbour with a Southern service bound for Seaford

General information
- Location: Newhaven, Lewes; England
- Grid reference: TQ449009
- Manager: Southern
- Platforms: 2

Other information
- Station code: NVH
- Classification: DfT category F1

History
- Pre-grouping: LB&SCR
- Post-grouping: Southern Railway

Key dates
- 8 December 1847: Opened (as Newhaven Wharf)
- 17 May 1886: Renamed Newhaven Harbour
- 1914: closed (except for workmen)
- 1919: reopened

Passengers
- 2021/22: ▲18,298
- 2022/23: ▲23,176
- 2023/24: ▲24,584
- 2024/25: ▲27,934
- 2025/26: ▲31,034
Location
Notes
- Passenger statistics from the Office of Rail and Road

Newhaven Harbour railway station is a railway station in Newhaven, East Sussex, England. It originally served boat train services to Dieppe, but that was taken over by Newhaven Marine (now closed) and then Newhaven Town.

== Location ==
The station is located on the Seaford branch of the East Coastway line, 56 miles 51 chains (91.1 km) down the line from London Bridge. The line reduces from two tracks to one immediately south of the station en route to Seaford.

There are two platforms at the station, joined by a footbridge. The station is managed by Southern, which operates all passenger services.

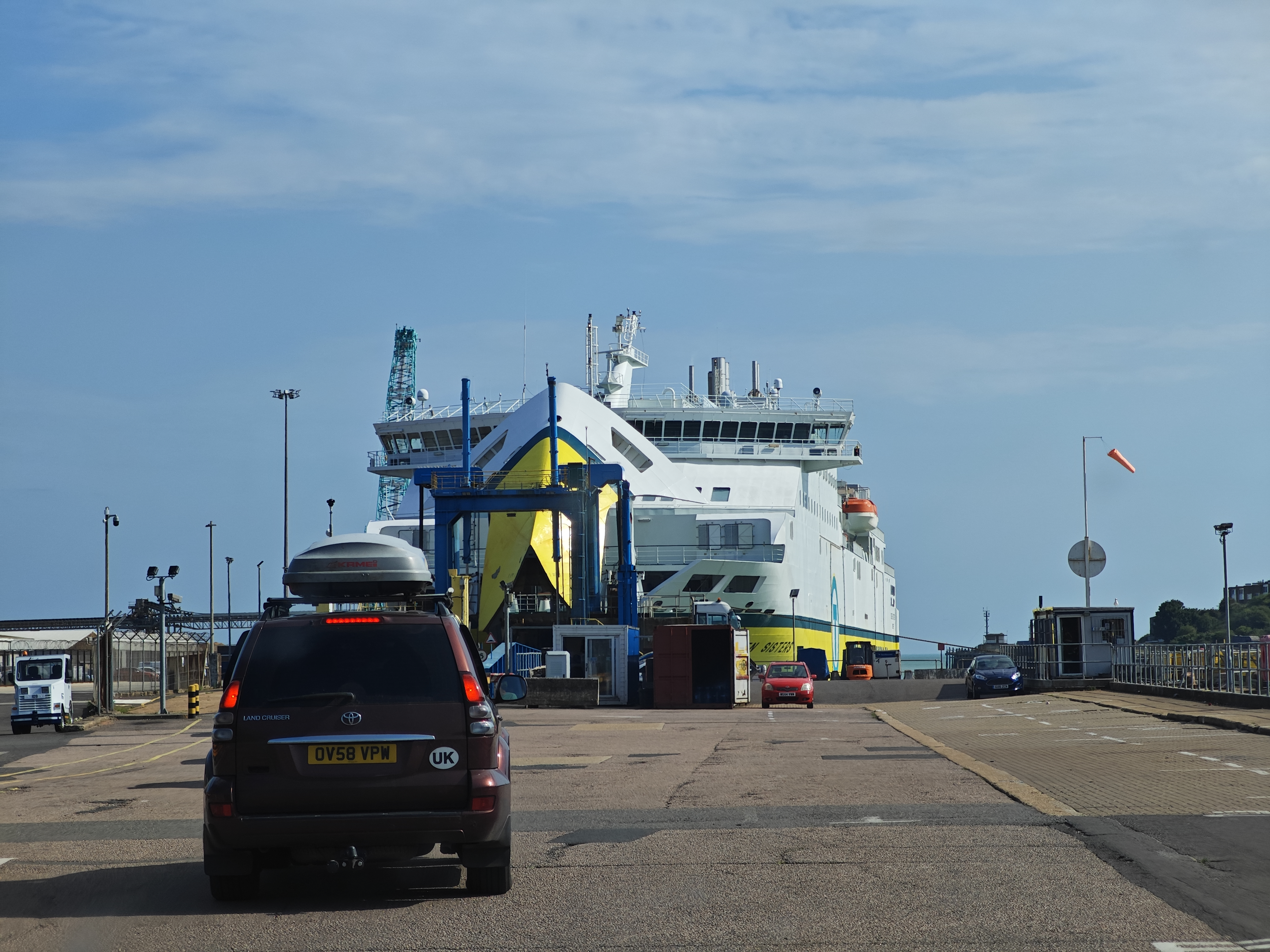
Newhaven Harbour railway station and adjacent ferry terminal area

Newhaven Harbour is one of two stations serving the town of Newhaven, alongside Newhaven Town station less than half a mile (0.8 km) to the north. A third station in the town, Newhaven Marine, operated passenger services until 2006 and formally closed in October 2020. Newhaven Harbour station is located on the south side of the town, adjacent to the Port of Newhaven freight terminal and nearby industrial estate.

Despite the station's name, it no longer serves the passenger ferry terminal − this was taken over by Newhaven Marine station, until the terminal was moved to a site next to Newhaven Town.

== History ==
The station was opened by the London, Brighton and South Coast Railway as Newhaven Wharf on 8 December 1847 as the terminus of a branch line from Lewes. Boat train services to Dieppe began the following year. The line was extended to Seaford in 1864.

In 1879, the port was redeveloped, constructing a new east pier and building a new wharf on reclaimed land, which could be run independently of tide times. The station was renamed to Newhaven Harbour on 17 May 1886 when a station to the south, known as Newhaven Harbour (Boat Station), opened to serve the new boat train terminal.

== Services ==
All services at Newhaven Harbour are operated by Southern using Class 377 EMUs.

The typical off-peak service in trains per hour is:

- 1 tph to Brighton via Lewes
- 1 tph to Seaford

This service increases to 2 tph during peak periods. Two services on weekdays (one in the middle of the day, and one in the evening) terminate here and reverse using the reversing siding at Newhaven Marine.

Connections with services to Gatwick Airport and London Victoria can be made by changing at Lewes.

Preceding station	National Rail	Following station
Newhaven Town	Southern Seaford Branch Line	Bishopstone
	Disused railways	
Newhaven Town Line and station open	Southern Seaford Branch Line	Newhaven Marine Line open, station closed
