= NVHS =

NVHS may refer to:

- Neuqua Valley High School
- New Vista High School
- North Valleys High School
- Neponset Valley Humane Society
- Nvidia High-Speed Signaling, see NVLink
- Narara Valley High School
