= HMS Brazen (1798) =

Sloop of the Royal Navy

History

France
- Name: L'Invincible General Bonaparte
- Fate: Captured 9 December 1798
- Notes: Privateer

Great Britain
- Name: HMS Brazen
- Commissioned: 19 October 1799
- Captured: 9 December 1798
- Fate: Wrecked 26 January 1800

General characteristics
- Class & type: sloop
- Tons burthen: 36317/94 (bm)
- Length: 105 ft 2 1/2 in (32.1 m) (overall); 68 ft 3 3/8 in (20.8 m) (keel)
- Beam: 28 ft 1 1/2 in (8.6 m)
- Depth of hold: 13 ft 7 1/2 in (4.2 m)
- Propulsion: Sails
- Sail plan: Sloop
- Complement: French service:170; British service:120
- Armament: French service:20 guns (12 & 18-pounders); British service: 16 × 24-pounder carronades; 2 × 6-pounder chase guns

HMS Brazen was the French privateer Invincible General Bonaparte (or Invincible Bonaparte or Invincible Buonaparte), which the British captured in 1798. She is best known for her wreck in January 1800 in which all but one of her crew drowned.

== Capture ==
Invincible General Bonaparte was a French privateer of 20 guns and 170 men under the command of Jean Pierre Lamothe and under the ownership of Salanche, Bordeaux. The frigate Boadicea captured her on 9 December 1798. She was sixteen days out of Bordeaux and reportedly had not made any captures.

However, a privateer by the same name had taken and burned Friendship, Smith, master, which had been sailing from St Ube's to Falmouth. Boadicea sent the Invincible Buonaparte, of "18 guns and 175 men" into Portsmouth.

The prize arrived at Spithead on 18 December and in time the Admiralty decided to purchase her. The Admiralty renamed her Brazen and established her as an 18-gun sloop of war.

== Service ==
Brazen was fitted for service in the Channel and Captain James Hanson, who had sailed with Captain George Vancouver (1791-4), commissioned her on 19 October 1799. Two weeks later, Captain Andrew Sproule, Commander of the Brighton Sea Fencibles wrote to Captain Henry Cromwell drawing attention to the presence of French privateers off the coast. A week later Admiral Milbanke told the Admiralty in London that "the Brazen Sloop sailed this morning under orders to cruise till further notice for the protection of the Trade and annoyance of the enemy between Beachy Head and Dunmose."

She sailed from Morwellham, a small inland Devon port, and on 25 January 1800, she captured a French vessel off the Isle of Wight that Hanson sent into Portsmouth with a 12-man prize crew. This left Brazen a little short-handed.

== Wreck ==
Early in the morning on the next day, 26 January 1800, Brazen was wrecked under high cliffs west of Newhaven. Captain Sproule and 20 Sea Fencibles rushed to the site but arrived too late to rescue any of the crew, all but one of whom died.

The sole survivor was Jeremiah Hill, a seaman from HMS Carysfort who had joined the crew of Brazen ten days before the wreck. Hill had been asleep below decks when the ship struck the cliffs on the night of 25 January. On waking he rushed to assist his crew mates, who were engaged in cutting away the main and mizzen masts to lighten the ship and avoid her beating against the rocks. Although they succeeded in cutting away the masts the force of the waves against the hull was too great and Brazen immediately heeled over onto her side. Hill, who could not swim, fell or jumped overboard and managed to grab a part of the main mast that was floating beside the hull. This kept him afloat until he was able to reach some broken timbers from one of Brazen's gun carriages. He clutched these and slowly floated to shore.

On the following morning, Brazen's hull was visible about half a mile from shore. The tide was low and observers could see large numbers of her crew still clinging to the upturned hull. As the hours passed the ship's remains gradually disappeared, until by high tide the waves were "breaking nearly fifty feet up the cliff face" and it was evident there could be no further survivors.

Sproule and his Sea Fencibles rescued what they could from Brazen, including the sternpost, two of her guns, and some timbers from the hull. As the bodies of the crew washed ashore the local citizens buried them in the churchyard of St Michael's in Newhaven. In all, they recovered some 95 bodies, out of a crew of about 105. Hanson's body, however, was never retrieved.

== Postscript ==
Friends of Captain Hanson erected a monument in the form of an obelisk in the churchyard. The text commemorates Hanson, his officers (who are named), and the crew. In 1878 his widow, Louisa, restored the monument. She lived to the age of 103 and is believed to have been the longest recipient of a naval pension on record.

The wrecking so shocked the people of Newhaven that they formed a committee to investigate how a similar disaster could be avoided. In May 1803, using funds partly raised locally and partly from Lloyd's of London, they acquired a rescue lifeboat of Henry Greathead's "Original" design. This was some twenty years before the formation of the Royal National Lifeboat Institution (RNLI).

== See also ==
- List of ships captured in the 19th century
