= MVH =

MVH or mvh may refer to:

- Mar Vista High School, a high school in Imperial Beach, California, United States
- Miami Valley Hospital, a large urban hospital in Dayton, Ohio, United States
- mvh, the ISO 639-3 code for Mire language, Chad
