= NUH =

NUH may refer to:

- National University Hospital, Singapore
- National Union of the Homeless
- Newham University Hospital, an acute general hospital in Plaistow, London
- Nottingham University Hospitals NHS Trust

== See also ==
- Nuh (disambiguation)
