= Newhaven =

Port town in East Sussex, England

Coordinates: 50.80°N 0.06°E

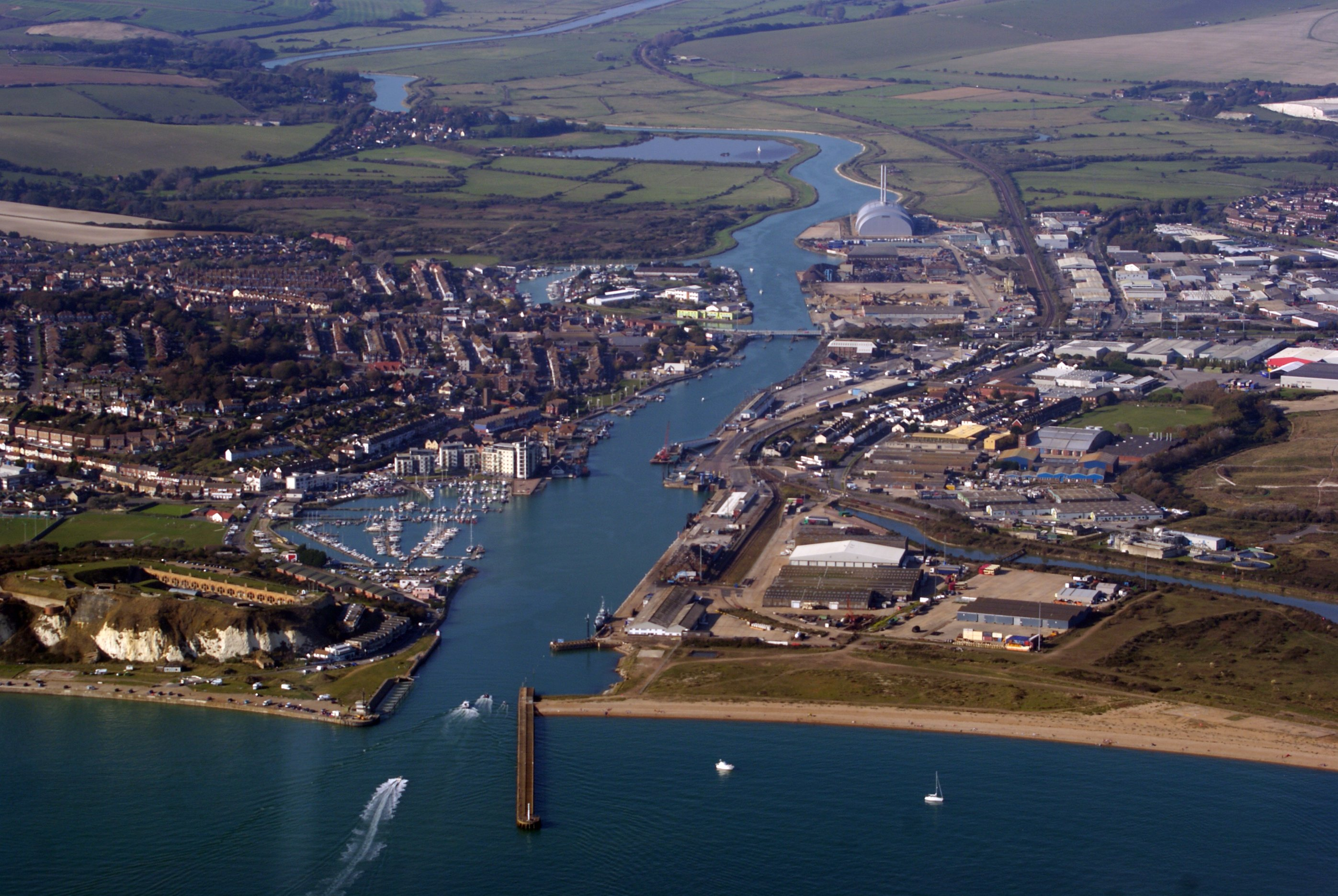
- From the air

- Location within East Sussex
- Area: 7.2 km^{2} (2.8 sq mi)
- Population: 12,854 (2021)
  - Density: 4,591/sq mi (1,773/km^{2})
- OS grid reference: TQ449016
  - London: 49 miles (79 km) N
- District: Lewes
- Shire county: East Sussex
- Region: South East
- Country: England
- Sovereign state: United Kingdom
- Post town: NEWHAVEN
- Postcode district: BN9
- Dialling code: 01273
- Police: Sussex
- Fire: East Sussex
- Ambulance: South East Coast
- UK Parliament: Lewes
- Website: Newhaven Town Council

Newhaven is a port town in the Lewes district of East Sussex, England, lying at the mouth of the River Ouse.

The town developed during the Middle Ages as the nearby port of Seaford began drying up, forcing a new port to be established. A sheltered harbour was built in the mid-16th century, and a breakwater in the late 18th, to provide continued access to the sea. Newhaven increased in importance following the arrival of the railway in 1847, and regular cross-Channel ferry services to Dieppe. Though these have been reduced in the 21st century, Newhaven still provides regular ferry services and continues to be used as an important freight terminal. In 2021 the parish had a population of 12,854.

== Origins ==
Newhaven lies at the mouth of the River Ouse, in the valley the river has cut through the South Downs. Over the centuries the river has migrated between Newhaven and Seaford in response to the growth and decay of a shingle spit (shoal) at its mouth.

There was a Bronze Age fort on what is now Castle Hill.

In about 480 AD, the Saxon people established a village near where Newhaven now stands; they named the settlement "Meeching", and was variously known as "Myching" or "Mitching".

Throughout the Middle Ages, the main outlet and port of the Ouse was at Seaford (one of the Cinque Ports).

The growth of the shingle spit hindered the outflow of the river, which consequently flooded the Levels upstream and hindered access to the port. Therefore, a channel through the shingle spit was cut in the mid-16th century below Castle Hill, creating access to a sheltered harbour, better than that at Seaford. This was the origin of modern Newhaven.

However, shingle continued to accumulate and so the mouth of the Ouse began to migrate eastwards again. Under the Ouse Navigation Act (1790), a western breakwater was constructed to arrest longshore drift and so cut off the supply of shingle to the spit. A new outlet (The Cut) was built on the river's present course, below Castle Hill. At that time the settlement began to be known as the "new haven". The present breakwater was built in 1890.

It was part of the Holmstrow hundred until the abolition of hundreds in the 19th century.

== Port ==
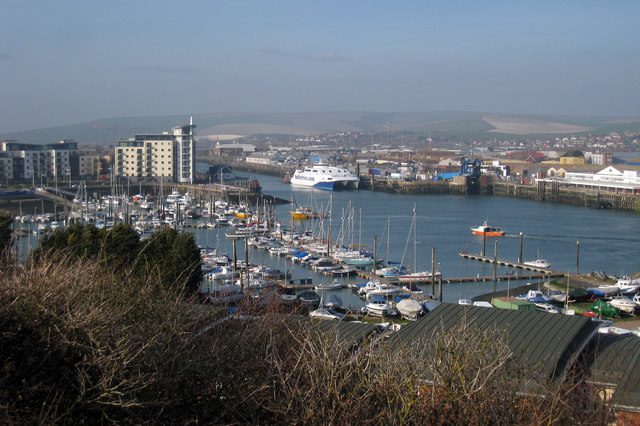
View of Newhaven marina & ferry port

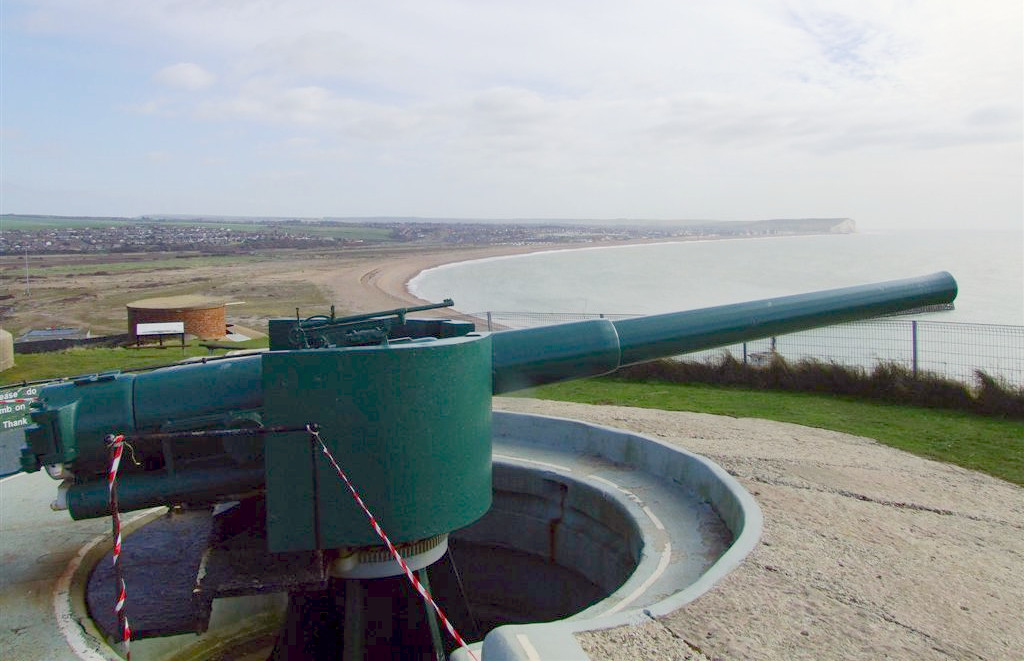
Newhaven fort

Although there are some signs of the derelict facilities that serviced the former train ferry operations, the port still sees a great deal of freight and passengers movement. International ferries run to the French port of Dieppe, Seine-Maritime, operated by DFDS Seaways. There are two outbound sailings per day, one in the morning and one in the evening, using the 18,654 GT ro-ro ferry MS Côte D'Albâtre. Rail passengers wishing to connect with the ferries are advised nationally to travel to Newhaven Town, and then use the free bus service; this has resulted in a dramatic fall in passenger services at Newhaven Harbour, leading to questions regarding its future and that of Newhaven Marine.

The port is the proposed main landside site for E.ON's development of the offshore-Rampion Wind Farm.

=== History ===
The village was of little maritime importance until the opening of the railway line to Lewes in 1847. In 1848, the exiled French King Louis Philippe I landed here in disguise after abdicating his throne. The London, Brighton & South Coast Railway (LB&SCR) constructed their own wharf and facilities on the east side of the river, and opened the Newhaven harbour railway station. The railway also funded the dredging of the channel and other improvements to the harbour between 1850 and 1878, to enable it to be used by cross-channel ferries, and in 1863 the LB&SCR and the Chemin de Fer de l'Ouest introduced the Newhaven-Dieppe passenger service. The harbour was officially recognised as 'The Port of Newhaven' in 1882. Imports at that time included French farm products and manufactures, timber, granite and slates.

Newhaven harbour was designated as the principal port for the movement of men and materiel to the European continent during the First World War and was taken over by the military authorities and the ferries requisitioned for the duration of the war. Between 22 September 1916 and 2 December 1918, the port and town of Newhaven were designated a 'Special Military Area' under the 'Defence of the Realm Regulations', and the Harbour station was closed to the public. The port and harbour facilities, rail sidings and warehousing were greatly enlarged at this time and electric lighting installed to allow for 24-hour operation.

During the Second World War, large numbers of Canadian troops were stationed at Newhaven, and the ill-fated Dieppe Raid in 1942 was largely launched from the harbour.

When the high-profile gambler and murder-suspect Lord Lucan vanished in 1974, his car was found abandoned in Norman Road, Newhaven, with traces of blood matching the blood-groups of his children's nanny Sandra Rivett, whom he is believed to have murdered, and his wife Veronica Bingham, Countess of Lucan, whom he had attempted to murder, according to her testimony. The Newhaven location suggested that he had taken the cross-channel ferry, but no confirmed sighting of him was ever made.

=== Lifeboat ===
The Newhaven Lifeboat, the first of which was commissioned in 1803, is among the oldest in Britain, and was established some 20 years before the Royal National Lifeboat Institution. The town established the rescue lifeboat in response to the wreck of HMS Brazen in January 1800, from which only one man of her crew of some 105 men could be saved. The town used a combination of funds raised locally and contributed by Lloyd's of London to purchase a lifeboat built to Henry Greathead's "Original" design. Newhaven also has one of the Watch stations of the National Coastwatch Institution.

== Industry ==
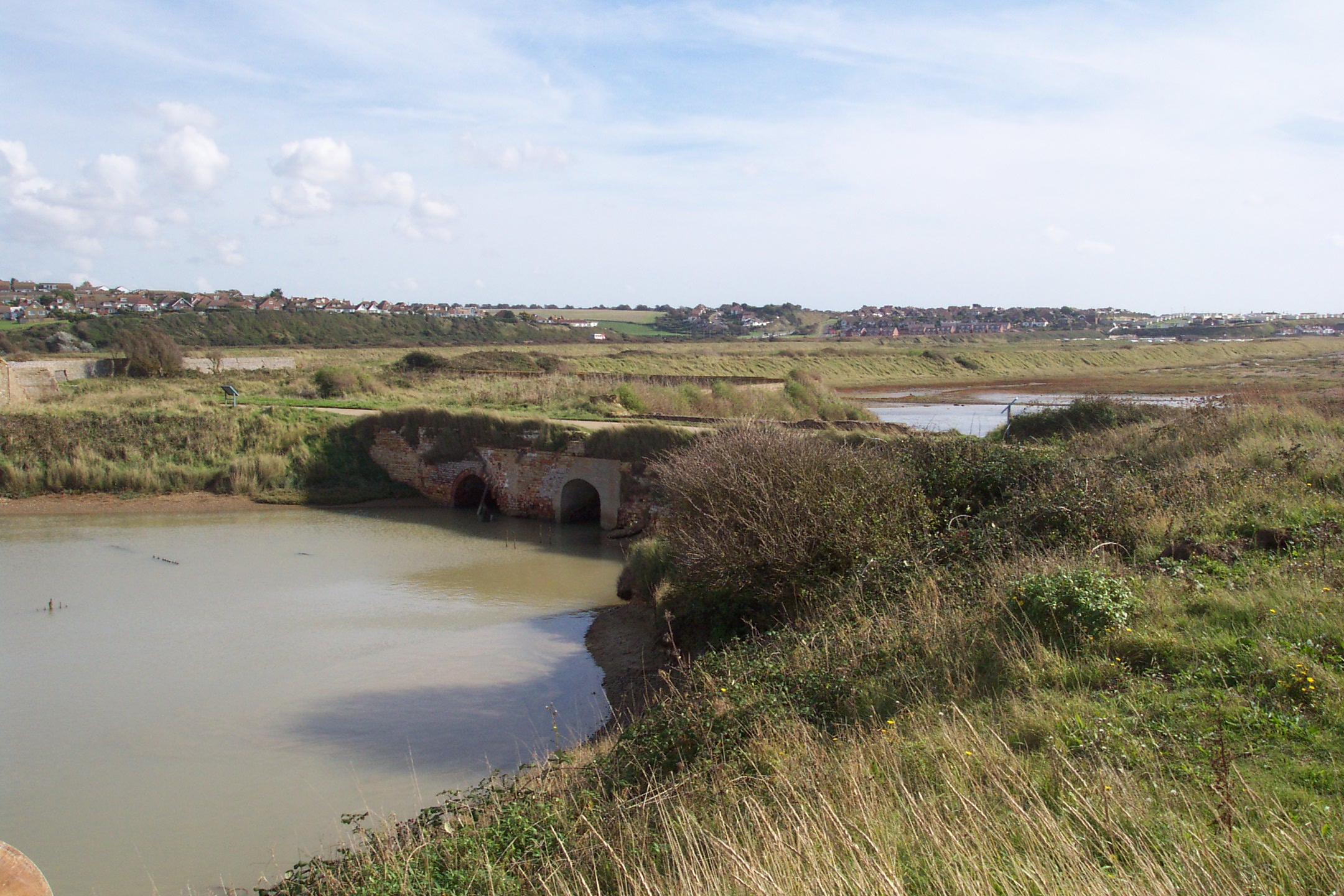
The former tidal mill

To the east, in the neighbouring parish of Seaford was the village of Tide Mills, built in 1761, and now derelict. Here are the remains of workers' cottages, the tide mill itself, and a large saline lagoon which was the storage pond for high water to power the mills on the outgoing tide.

The Newhaven Marconi Radio Station was established in 1904, and started running in 1905. The station was owned and operated by the Marconi Radio Company and achieved regular ship to shore radio communications in approximately 1912.

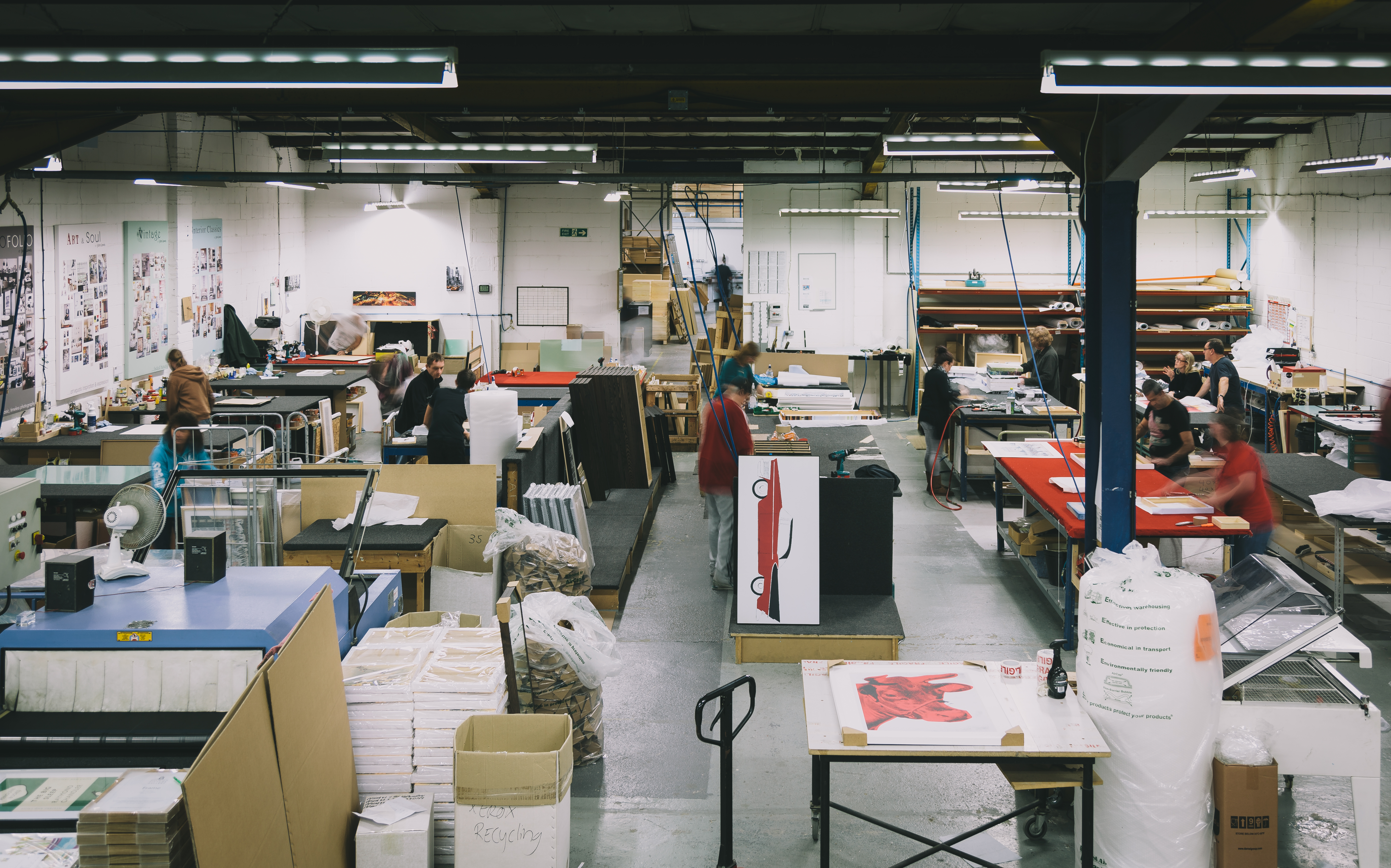
King & McGaw warehouse

To the east of Newhaven is the 50,000-foot production factory of King & McGaw, This company started out in printed art for professional organizations and was known as King Posters by the late 1980s. It then expanded to business to consumer trading over the internet. It is now the UK's largest online Art provider. The company's contribution to the area was recognised in April 2014 with a visit from local MP Norman Baker.

The Heritage Marine Hospital was built in 1924 to cater for disabled boys who had undergone surgery. It became a casualty of wartime defence work during the Second World War.

The Denton Island Business Park lies to the north of the town on the west bank of the river. The business park has attracted a number of businesses to the area with the basepoint Newhaven Enterprise Centre being the focal point. The centre has attracted a lot of new businesses to the area.

A new waste incinerator, just across from Denton Island, was completed in late 2011 and is now in full operation, despite huge opposition by local residents from across the Lewes District.

== Military ==
Historical

Newhaven Fort, one of the Palmerston Forts, was built on Castle Hill on the recommendation of the 1859 Royal Commission to defend the growing harbour. It was the largest defence work ever built in Sussex and is now open as a museum.

The adjacent village of Tide Mills was the site of an experimental seaplane base at the head of the beach. The first formation of No. 242 Squadron RAF was on 15 August 1918 from numbers 408, 409 and 514 Flights at the seaplane station at Newhaven, Sussex. Operating from there and the nearby airfield at Telscombe Cliffs, it was equipped with Short Type 184 seaplanes and carried out anti-submarine patrols over the English Channel until the end of the First World War. Surveys carried out in 2006 have exposed part of the slipway, concrete aprons to both hangars with door tracks and several other slabs presumed to be workshops. Sussex Archaeological Society started a dig in April 2006 to catalogue the entire East Beach site.

The town also hosted HMS Aggressive, a Royal Navy shore establishment, from 1941 to 1945. It was the base for the 1st Steam Gun Boat Flotilla.

Army Cadet Force

- A detachment of the Sussex Army Cadet Force, a volunteer youth organisation, sponsored by the Ministry of Defence, which accepts cadets aged between 12 and 18 years of age.

== Layout ==
The main part of the town is located on the west side of the river, there is also a residential area at Denton and Mount Pleasant on the slopes of the Downs to the east. Industrial areas lay on the east side of the river as do all three of the railway stations which serve Newhaven; Newhaven Town, Newhaven Harbour and the now redundant Newhaven Marine. Recent housing development has taken place at the West Quay, Harbour Heights, August Fields and the old Parker Pen site (Safford Park).

== Governance ==
Newhaven Town Council was formed in 1974. There are 18 councillors representing five wards: Denton ward (five councillors); South ward (eight); North ward (three) and Central ward (two), Valley Ward (three).

The town comprises two wards of Lewes District (part of the county of East Sussex.) Newhaven North ward returns 2 district councillors to Lewes District Council, and Newhaven South ward returns 3 district councillors. The 4 May 2023 local elections returned 5 Liberal Democrat councillors for the 5 seats.

The parliamentary constituency for Newhaven is Lewes. From 1974 to 1997 Tim Rathbone served as the constituency member of parliament, for the Conservatives. The Liberal Democrat Norman Baker was elected member of parliament in 1997 and served until 2015, when Conservative Maria Caulfield was elected. Since July 2024, Liberal Democrat James MacCleary is the MP, who lives with his family in Newhaven.

== Demography ==
Newhaven's population (12,232 persons) are 59% of working age; 22% are 15 and under; and 19% retirement age. There are over 360 businesses in the town.

== Landmarks ==
The main landmark in the town is the Newhaven Fort. The new waste incinerator is a major landmark, the chimney being visible from the sea as well as from Firle Beacon and parts of Seaford.

The parish includes part of the Brighton to Newhaven Cliffs Site of Special Scientific Interest. The cliffs are mainly of geological interest, containing many Santonian and Campanian fossils. The SSSI listing includes flora and fauna biological interest too.

The open land surrounding Newhaven to the west, north and east is part of the South Downs National Park, although the town itself is excluded from the boundaries.

== Transport ==
Newhaven lies at the southern end of the cross-country A26 trunk road originating in Maidstone; and its junction with the A259 coast road between Brighton and Eastbourne. It is also located on the Seaford Branch Line from Lewes; there are two operating railway stations, Newhaven Town and Newhaven Harbour. A third, for all intents and purposes unused since its train ferry services ceased using it, was Newhaven Marine railway station.

Walkers on the Vanguard Way, a long-distance footpath, end their journey here from East Croydon in south London.

== Education, culture and religion ==
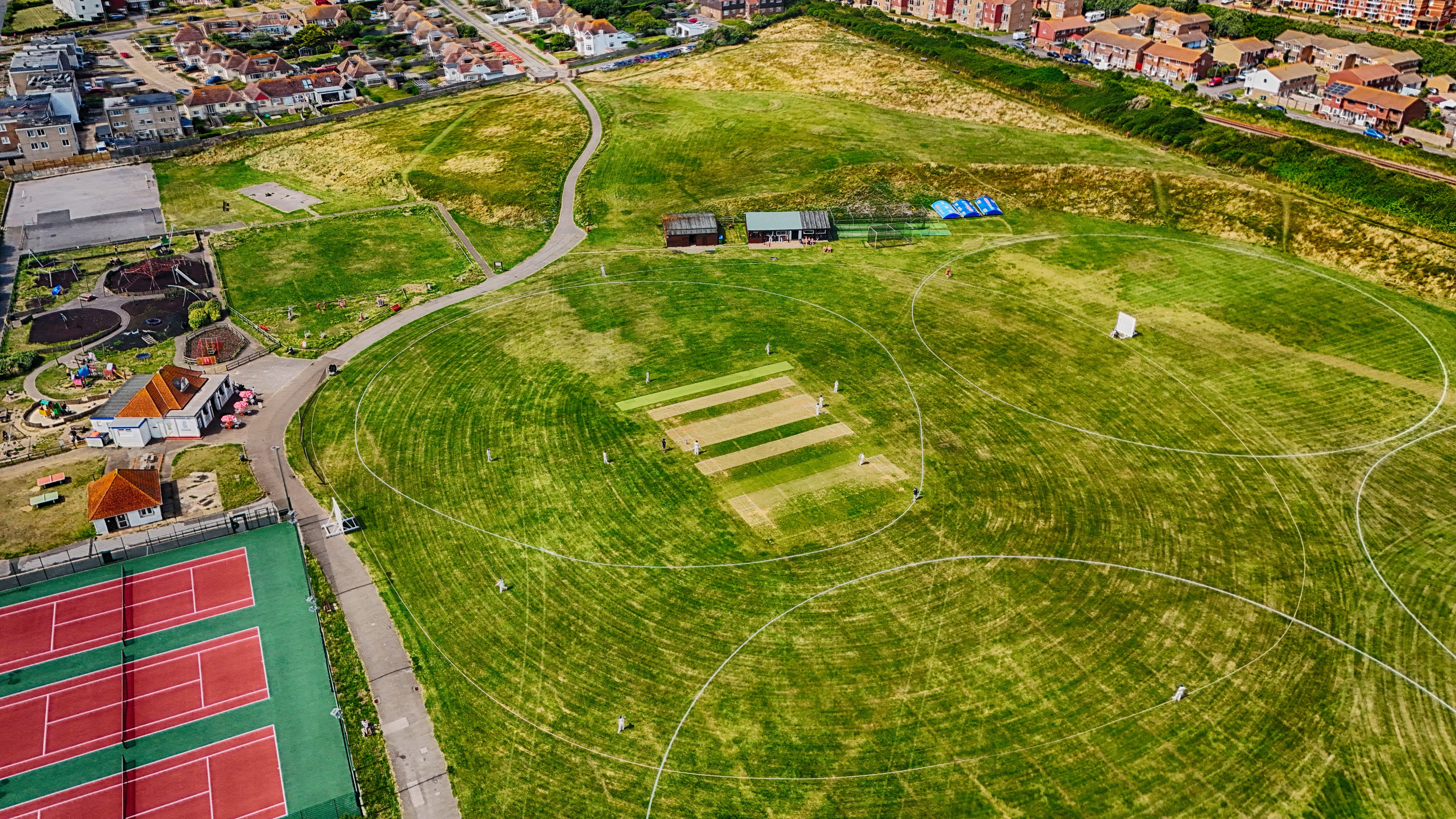
The cricket club at Newhaven

There is one secondary school in the town: Seahaven Academy (previously known as Tideway Comprehensive), There are four primary schools: Denton Community Primary, Breakwater academy, Harbour Primary School and High cliff Academy which opened in September 2015 in a brand-new building in Southdown Road, on what was part of the Tideway Comprehensive School site.

The Newhaven Local & Maritime Museum is operated by the Newhaven Historical Society and is a registered charity. The Planet Earth Museum and Sussex History Trail is dedicated to the history of the earth. They are both located at Paradise Park which is a garden centre owned by the Tate family.

The parish church is dedicated to St Michael and is shared by the Church of England and Methodist communities. The Roman Catholic church is dedicated to the Sacred Heart (Church of the Sacred Heart).

The town is featured in Crime Is My Business by W. Howard Baker (Sexton Blake Library No 408, Amalgamated Press, 1958) and possibly based on an idea or material by Jack Trevor Story. Although mentioned (along with Brighton, Beachy Head, and Eastbourne), the references are vague and one would not recognise the town from the book. Other references in the text (a typical Sexton Blake adventure) suggest a roadside café somewhere in the region of the recently demolished Peacehaven Motel, which was formerly situated at the eastern end of Peacehaven.

Newhaven has a thriving art community with the art club being formed in the 1960s and new galleries displaying local work in the town.

=== Twinning ===
Newhaven is twinned with La Chapelle-Saint-Mesmin, France.

=== Sport ===
Newhaven is home to a marina: the Newhaven and Seaford Sailing Club is based there; scuba diving, water skiing and surfboarding are also practised. Newhaven Football Club plays in the Sussex County League; there is a thriving archery club. The town also boasts a large and modern indoor bowls centre, and there is an outdoor Lawn bowling green located close to the marina. Newhaven Bowling club was formed in 1902 and is a founder member of the English Bowls Association and Sussex County Bowls. There are also two cricket grounds, one located near the marina, west of the river, and the other close to Denton Village, east of the river, plus a tennis club also near the marina.

=== Local Media ===
Local news and television programmes is provided by BBC South East and ITV Meridian. Television signals are received from the Heathfield and the local relay transmitter.

The town's local radio stations are BBC Radio Sussex on 95.0 FM, Seahaven FM on 96.3 FM whose studios are in Eastbourne and Heart South on 96.9 FM.

Local newspapers that cover the town are The Argus, Sussex Express and Haven News.

== Notable people ==
- Charles Wells, the "man who broke the bank at Monte Carlo" casino, who bought a house in Fort Road with some of the proceeds
- Charles Webb, the author of The Graduate
- Wreckless Eric, musician
- Ho Chi Minh in 1913. When he was a pastry boy on the Newhaven–Dieppe ferry route.
- Leonard White, actor and producer of The Avengers
- Nick Pynn, musician and composer
- Nigel Buxton, Travel writer and TV personality,
- Alistair Appleton, TV presenter, therapist and meditation teacher
