= Seaford branch line =

Railway line in East Sussex, England

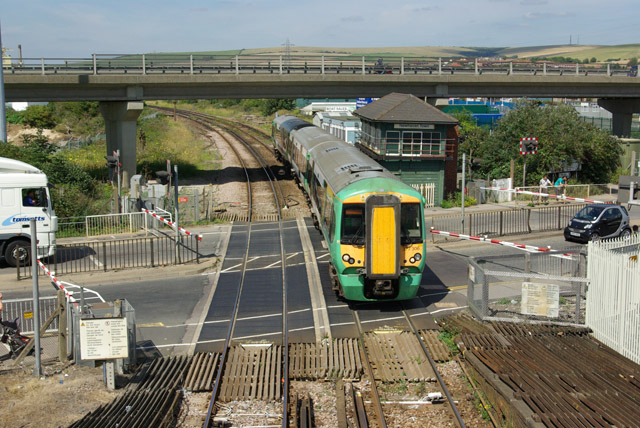
- A Southern Class 377 on the level crossing by Newhaven Town station in 2007

Overview
- Status: Operational
- Owner: Network Rail
- Locale: East Sussex; South East England
- Termini: Southerham Junction; Seaford
- Stations: 5

Service
- Type: Heavy rail
- System: National Rail
- Services: Southerham Junction–Seaford
- Operator(s): Southern
- Rolling stock: Class 377 "Electrostar"

History
- Opened: 1864

Technical
- Line length: 7 miles 66 chains (12.59 km)
- Number of tracks: 2 (Southerham Junction–Newhaven Harbour); 1 (Newhaven Harbour–Seaford)
- Character: Rural
- Track gauge: 1,435 mm (4 ft 8 1/2 in) standard gauge
- Electrification: 750 V DC third rail
Route map
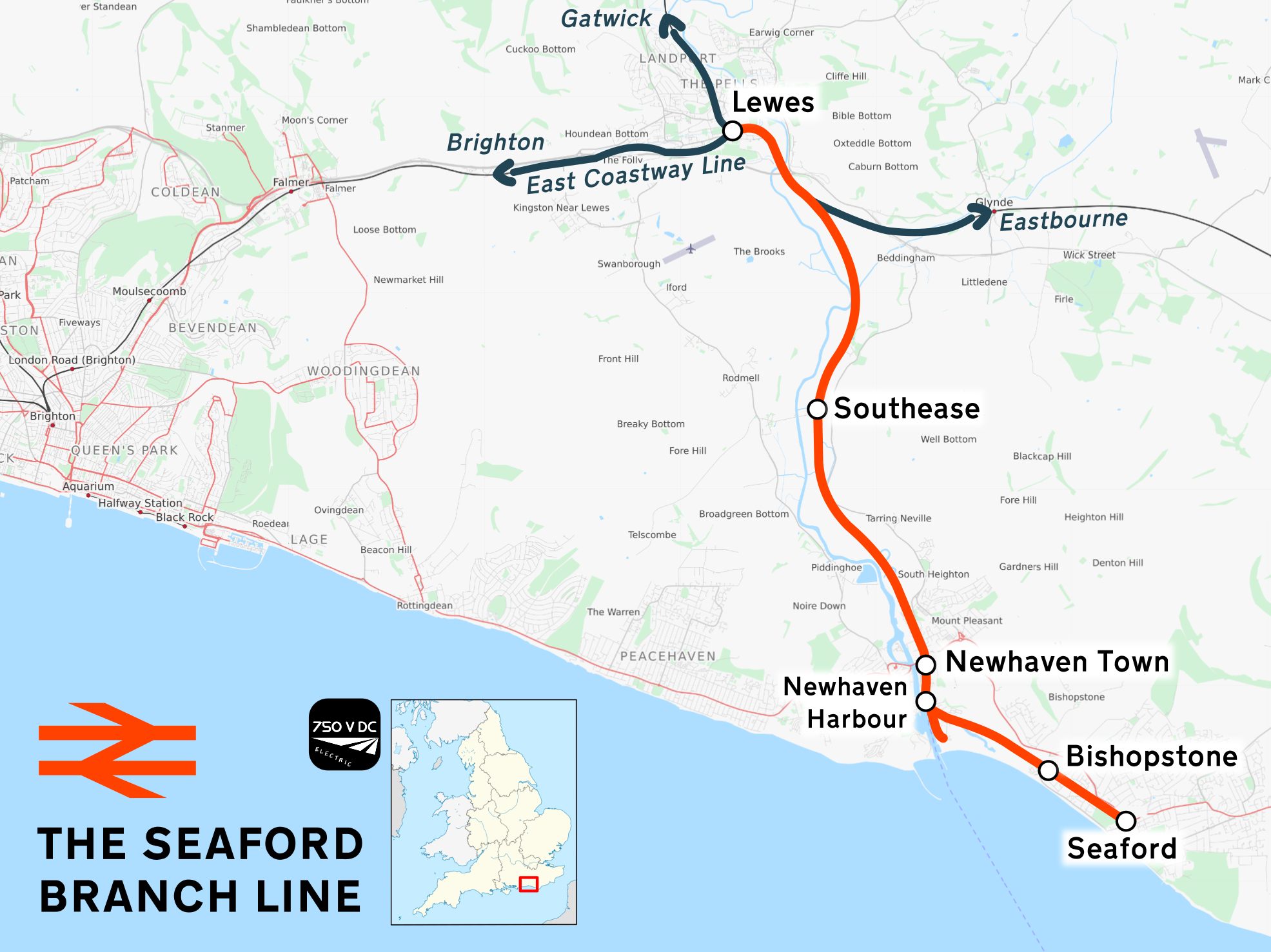
(Click to expand)

The Seaford branch line is a rural railway line in East Sussex constructed in 1864 primarily to serve the port of Newhaven and the town of Seaford. It now sees fairly regular trains across the line except for the branch to the closed Newhaven Marine station.

== History ==
Engineered by the London, Brighton and South Coast Railway's Chief Engineer Frederick Banister, the first section of the line was opened in 1847 to aid the transport of goods to and from Newhaven. The line was extended in 1864 to serve the holiday town of Seaford. There used to be extensive sidings at Newhaven Docks and even a railway swing bridge over the River Ouse to connect to the dock facilities on the west side of the river. These have now been removed, and services to Newhaven Marine station have also been discontinued. Once a busy station serving ferries to and from France, the walk of just under 1/4 mile to Newhaven Harbour station and the lack of winter ferries forced its closure.

The line was electrified (750 V DC third rail) by the Southern Railway in 1935. The line between Newhaven Harbour and Seaford was reduced to single track to save costs in 1975.

== Route ==
- Services, generally originating from Brighton, stop at Lewes on the East Coastway Line, the last station before the branch line splits off.
- The branch line starts at Southerham Junction on the East Coastway Line.
- The first station on the line is Southease, which serves the village of Southease and also has links to the South Downs Way
- The line then continues, running alongside the River Ouse to Newhaven Town, which is the station serving the town centre of Newhaven, across a swing bridge over the nearby river.
- The following station Newhaven Harbour no longer serves ferries to France.
  - Immediately after Newhaven Harbour station, a small branch splits off to Newhaven Marine, which was closed to passengers in August 2006 but remained technically open until October 2020. Originally built to link with cross-channel ferries, this short branch line is now closed to passengers, but occasional freight trains still use the sidings, as well as a small number of passenger trains terminating at Newhaven Harbour using the branch line to reverse.
- The line then becomes a single-track and is one of a few single-track third-rail lines in the country.
- It passes the closed station of Bishopstone Beach Halt, and over a foot crossing that offers access to the abandoned village of Tide Mills.
- The line then straightens out and calls at two more stations.
  - Bishopstone (serving the village of Bishopstone and the western end of Seaford) and
  - Seaford (the end of the line, serving Seaford town centre)

== Train services ==
Train services are operated by Southern. Class 377 "Electrostars" are used on the line to transport passengers to Lewes and Brighton.

The normal off peak train service on the line is two trains per hour between Brighton and Seaford calling at London Road, Moulsecoomb, Falmer, Lewes, Southease (1tph only), Newhaven Town, Newhaven Harbour (1 tph only), Bishopstone and Seaford. Services alternate between calling at Southease and Newhaven Harbour.

Currently, there are no regular direct services from the branch line towards London, with passengers needing to change at Lewes in order to travel towards Gatwick Airport and London Victoria. Passengers can also change at Lewes for connecting services towards Eastbourne and Hastings
