= Lewes railway station =

Railway station in East Sussex, England

Lewes
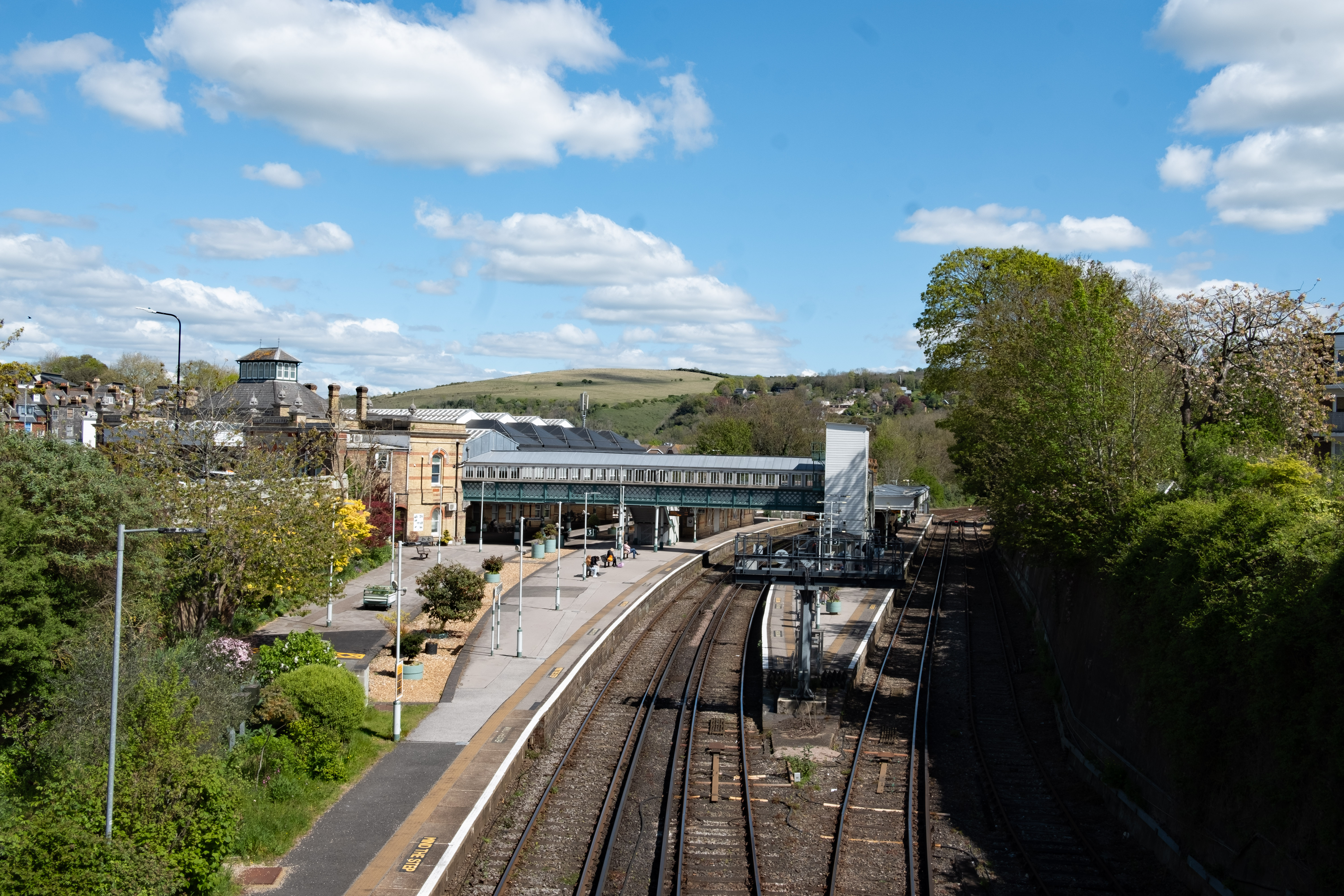

General information
- Location: Lewes, District of Lewes, England
- Coordinates: 50°52′15″N 0°0′42″E
- Grid reference: TQ416098
- Manager: Southern
- Platforms: 5

Other information
- Station code: LWS
- Classification: DfT category C2

Key dates
- 1846: Opened
- 1857: Resited
- 1889: Rebuilt

Passengers
- 2020/21: ▼0.767 million
- Interchange: ▼0.121 million
- 2021/22: ▲1.876 million
- Interchange: ▲0.297 million
- 2022/23: ▲2.174 million
- Interchange: ▲0.412 million
- 2023/24: ▲2.366 million
- Interchange: ▲0.494 million
- 2024/25: ▲2.626 million
- Interchange: ▲0.581 million
Location
Notes
- Passenger statistics from the Office of Rail and Road

Lewes railway station serves the town of Lewes, in East Sussex, England. It has five platforms and lies on the East Coastway Line, 49 miles 74 chains (80.3 km) from London Bridge, via Redhill. Services are provided by Southern.

== History ==
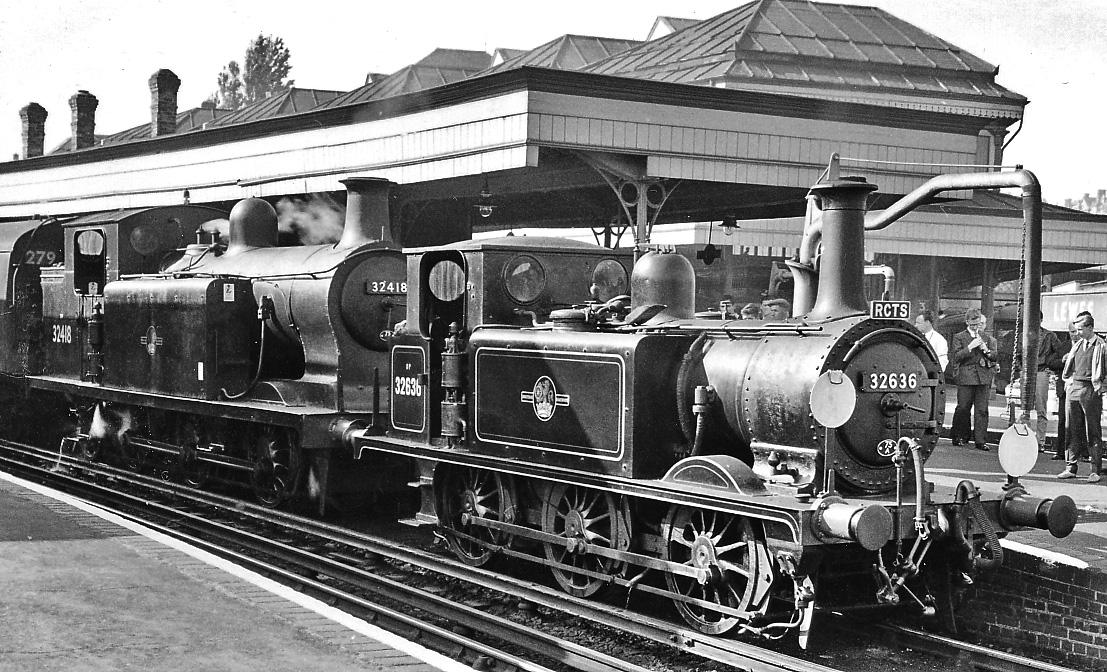
The Sussex Rail Tour, organised by the Railway Correspondence & Travel Society, 1962

The first station in Friars Walk opened on 8 June 1846 and was originally built as a terminus on the Brighton line; however, this station became inconvenient after an extension to Hastings opened on 27 June 1846. The new railway met the Brighton line at a junction just west of Lewes station towards Brighton; this required trains serving Lewes to reverse. The director of the London, Brighton & South Coast Railway called the station "the most incomplete and injudicious station ever erected".

On 2 October 1847, the Keymer Junction to Lewes line opened. New platforms, called Pinwell, were built opposite the terminus, west of the Hastings line branch. On 1 November 1857, a new station was built at the divergence of the Keymer Junction line. The old station closed; the original booking hall with grand classical columns outside survived until the 1960s before it was demolished. The new building was built in the style of a Swiss chalet. A new junction for the realigned Wealden Line opened on 1 October 1868. The new alignment went through part of the station goods yard of the original terminus. Before this change, the Wealden line joined the Keymer line at Hamsey Junction between the north portal of Lewes Tunnel and Cooksbridge.

The second station was rebuilt in order to increase platform capacity and reduce the narrow curvature of the track; it opened on 17 June 1889. On 1 October 1889, all passenger services were diverted from the original loop line between Lewes and Southerham Junction onto this alignment. The original route was retained for goods only.

On 5 November 1960, severe flooding of the track caused the suspension of all electric services; these were replaced by whatever steam locomotives were available. The Borough surveyor requested that the London-bound platforms should be blown up to allow flood water to escape via the railway trackbed; however, the British Railways district engineer declined to co-operate. The line to Wivelsfield remained inoperable for some time.

In the 1960s, the original 1846 terminus building fronting the public street (Friars Walk), was demolished.

The line to Uckfield closed on 23 February 1969, in order that a relief road in Lewes could be built over the redundant trackbed.

Until 2018, the station was served by hourly services through to Ashford International; these were discontinued as part of the May 2018 timetable changes. This was due to long journey times and insufficient rolling stock; at the time, the line to Ashford was served by two-car diesel multiple units—which caused overcrowding, particularly on the section between Brighton and Eastbourne. Since then, services to and from Ashford have only run as far as Eastbourne.

== Accidents and incidents ==
On 13 August 2026, a Greater Thameslink Railway train derailed near the station, at approximately 15:54. Three coaches of the train were found lying on their side.

== Layout ==
The station is located at a junction, where two western branches of the East Coastway line join to continue eastwards towards Eastbourne. Each of the two branches has its own set of platforms (the junction itself is immediately east of the station). The two sets of platforms together form a "V" shape (keilbahnhof), with a large open area and the main station building between platforms 2 and 3.

=== London branch ===
Platforms 1 and 2 serve the London branch. Both platforms are long enough to accommodate a 12-carriage train;

- 1 is an eastbound side platform used by trains originating in London running towards Eastbourne and Hastings
- 2 is usually served by westbound services towards London Victoria or London Bridge, via Gatwick Airport, although it is also signalled for eastbound departures, meaning that it can be used by trains that reverse at the station to run to and from the east.

=== Brighton branch ===
Platforms 3, 4 and 5 are located on the Brighton branch. These platforms are considerably shorter than those on the London side; platforms 3 and 5 are only long enough to accommodate six carriages, while platform 4 can hold seven:

- 3 is an eastbound platform served by through trains from Brighton towards Seaford, Eastbourne and Hastings;
- 4 and 5 are both signalled bi-directionally, but in normal service they are used by westbound trains towards Brighton; through services usually use platform 4, while those that start and terminate here normally run from platform 5.

== Facilities ==
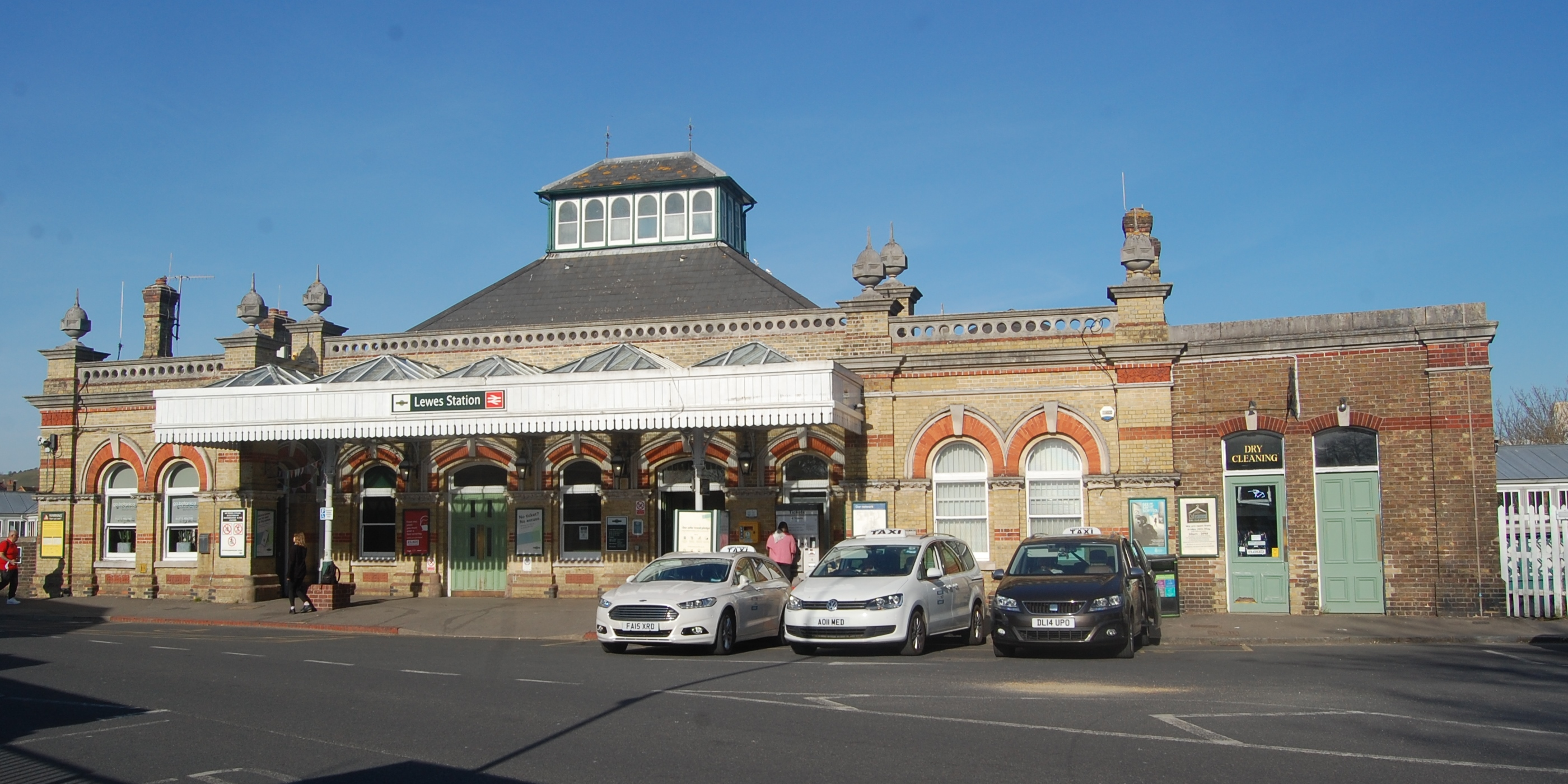
The façade and forecourt, 2021

The station has a ticket office, staffed seven days a week. There is step-free access to all platforms and a car park, with 293 spaces. There is also a café.

A taxi office is located on the main forecourt, with a small taxi rank outside.

== Services ==
All services at Lewes are operated by Southern; the typical off-peak service in trains per hour (tph) is:

- 2 tph to London Victoria, via Gatwick Airport
- 4 tph to Brighton (3 of these call at all stations and 1 runs non-stop from Falmer)
- 2 tph to Seaford
- 2 tph to Eastbourne (1 semi-fast, 1 stopping)
- 2 tph to Ore, via Hastings (1 semi-fast, 1 stopping).

Preceding station	National Rail	Following station
Plumpton or Cooksbridge	Southern East Coastway Line - London Branch	Polegate
Falmer	Southern East Coastway Line - Brighton Branch	Glynde
Falmer	Southern Seaford Branch Line	Southease or Newhaven Town
	Disused railways	
Barcombe Line and station closed	London, Brighton and South Coast Railway Lewes and East Grinstead Railway	Terminus
Barcombe Mills Line and station closed	London, Brighton and South Coast Railway Wealden Line	Terminus
