= Seaford railway station (England) =

Railway station in East Sussex, England

Coordinates: 50.773°N 0.100°E

Seaford (Sussex)
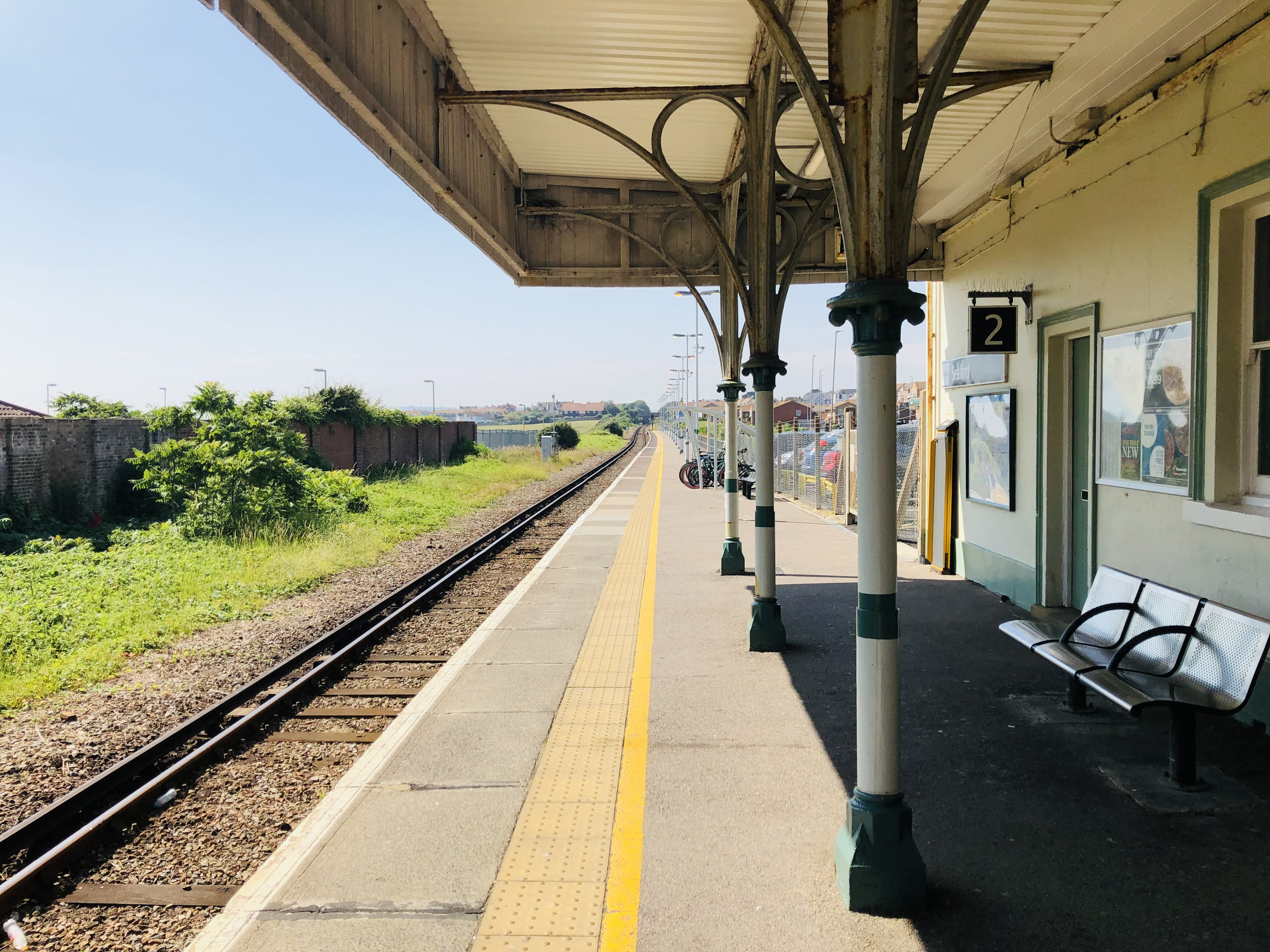

General information
- Location: Seaford, Lewes; England
- Grid reference: TV481991
- Owner: Network Rail
- Manager: Southern
- Platforms: 1 (formerly 2)

Other information
- Station code: SEF
- Classification: DfT category D

History
- Pre-grouping: LB&SCR
- Post-grouping: Southern Railway

Key dates
- 1 June 1864: Opened

Passengers
- 2020/21: ▼0.205 million
- 2021/22: ▲0.474 million
- 2022/23: ▲0.553 million
- 2023/24: ▲0.614 million
- 2024/25: ▲0.707 million
Location
Notes
- Passenger statistics from the Office of Rail & Road

Seaford railway station is in Seaford, East Sussex, England. It is the terminus of the Seaford branch line of the East Coastway line, 58 miles 77 chains (94.9 km) measured from London Bridge. The line to the station has been reduced to a single track and only one platform remains in use (previously two), though it is still numbered platform 2. Platform 1 is still visible but the track has been removed.

Train services from the station are provided by Southern.

The London, Brighton & South Coast Railway opened Seaford station on 1 June 1864. It was designed as a through station for a proposed extension to Eastbourne that was never built.

A working model of Seaford Station as it appeared in the 1920s is displayed at Seaford Museum.

== Signal box ==
At the end of the station, there was a signal box that was used until the mid-1980s. The box was damaged by the salt air from the nearby sea, and was dangerously unstable; it was demolished in February 2002.

== Services ==
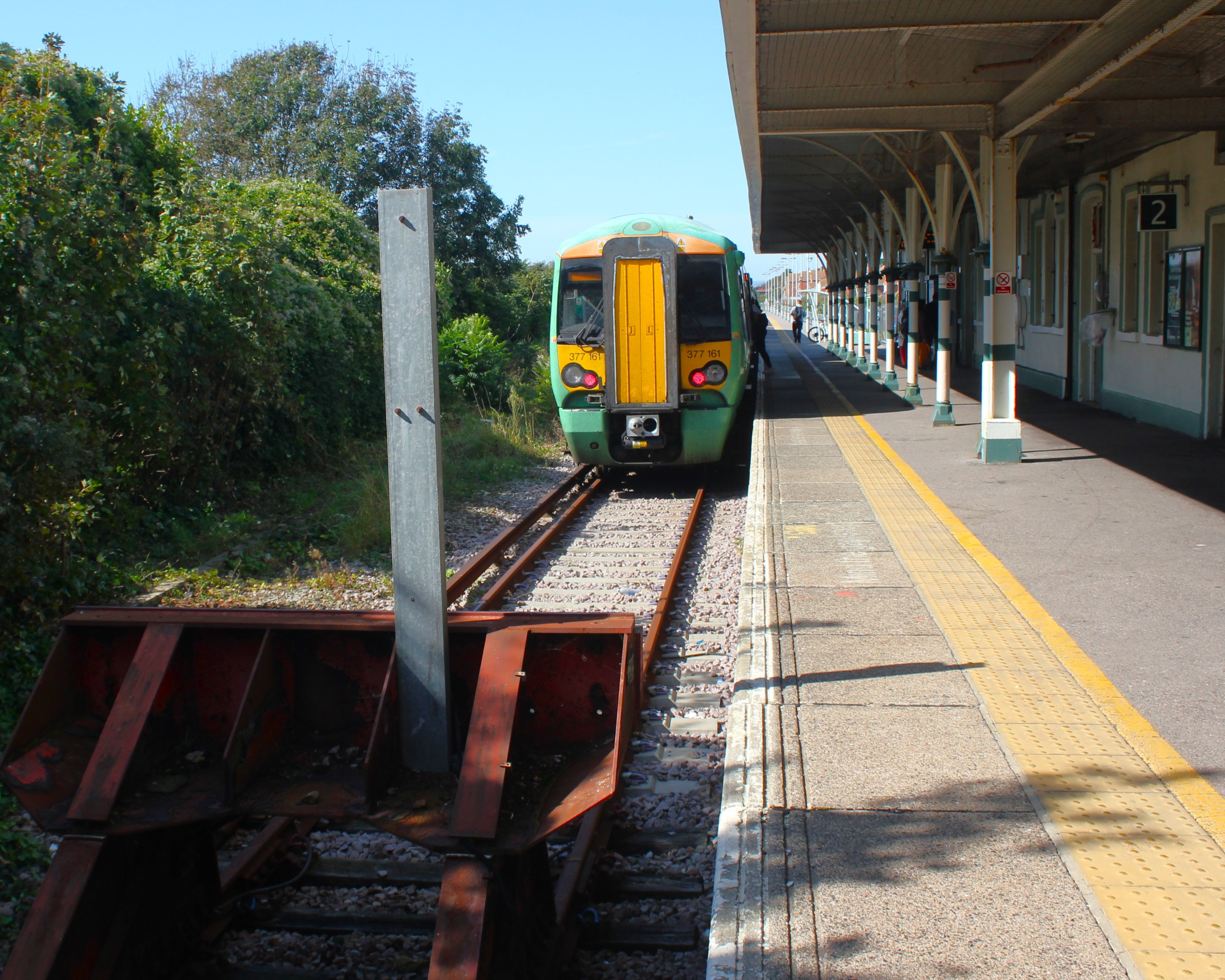
A Class 377 at Seaford with a Southern service for Brighton

As of August 2021 the typical off-peak service pattern is two trains per hour to Brighton via Lewes, seven days a week. Services are operated by Class 377s.

Preceding station	National Rail	Following station
Bishopstone	Southern; Seaford Branch Line	Terminus

== Gallery ==
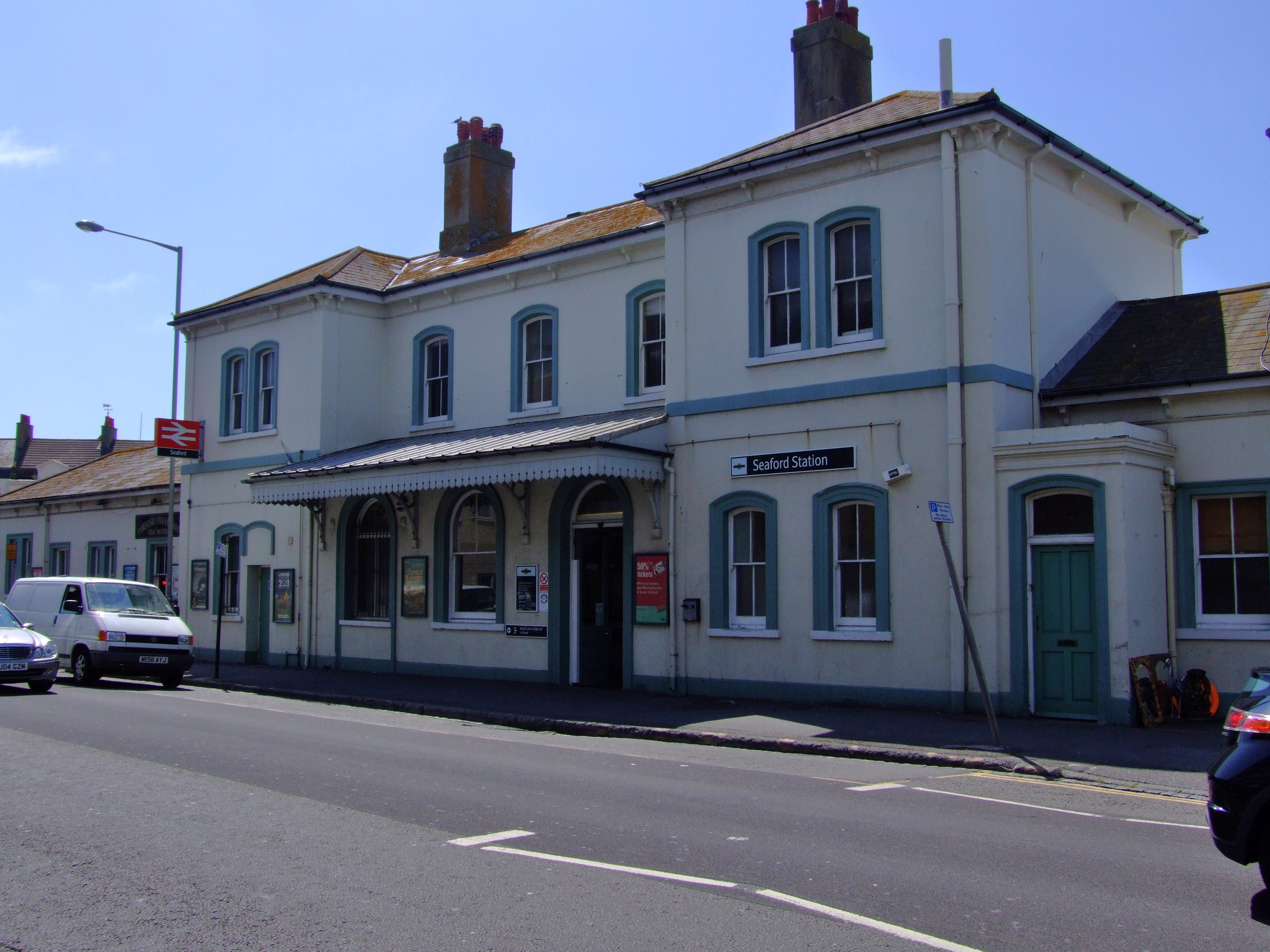
The station building

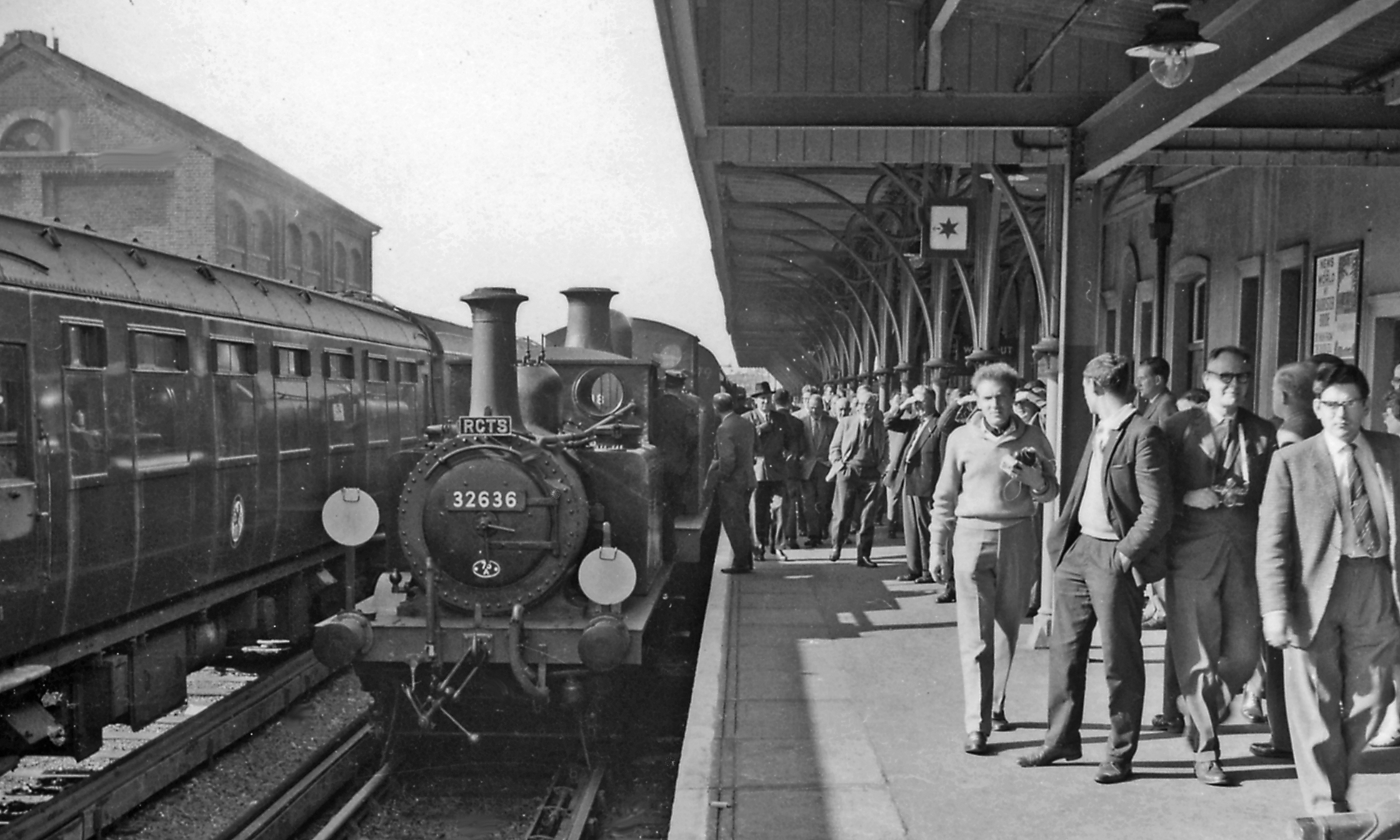
Railway Correspondence & Travel Society Sussex rail tour in 1962

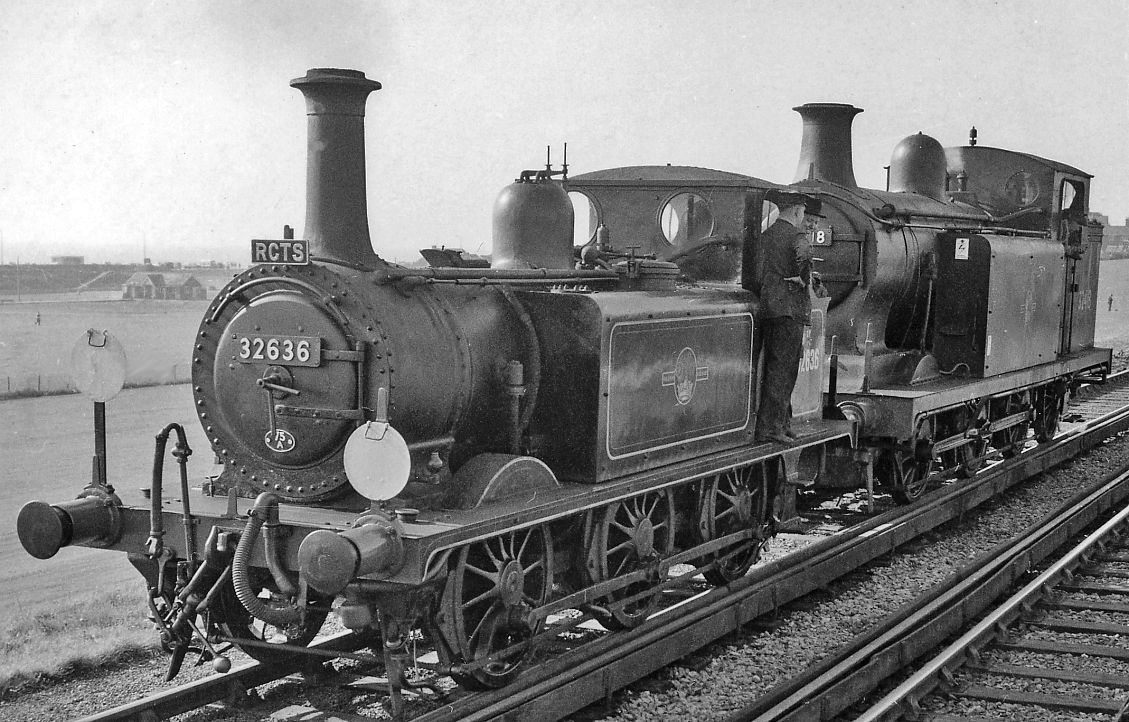
A1X class 0-6-0T No. 32636 and E4 class 0-6-2T
