= Bishopstone, East Sussex =

Village in East Sussex, England

Coordinates: 50.78896°N 0.08840°E

Bishopstone
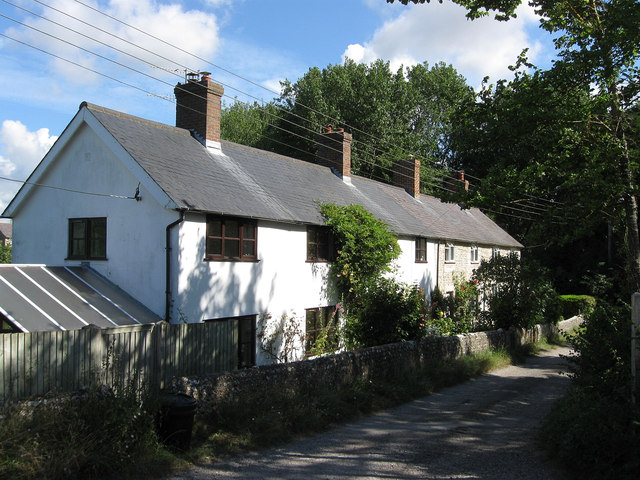
- White Row

- Location within East Sussex
- OS grid reference: TQ473009
- Civil parish: Seaford
- District: Lewes
- Shire county: East Sussex
- Region: South East
- Country: England
- Sovereign state: United Kingdom
- Post town: SEAFORD
- Postcode district: BN25
- Dialling code: 01323
- Police: Sussex
- Fire: East Sussex
- Ambulance: South East Coast
- UK Parliament: Lewes

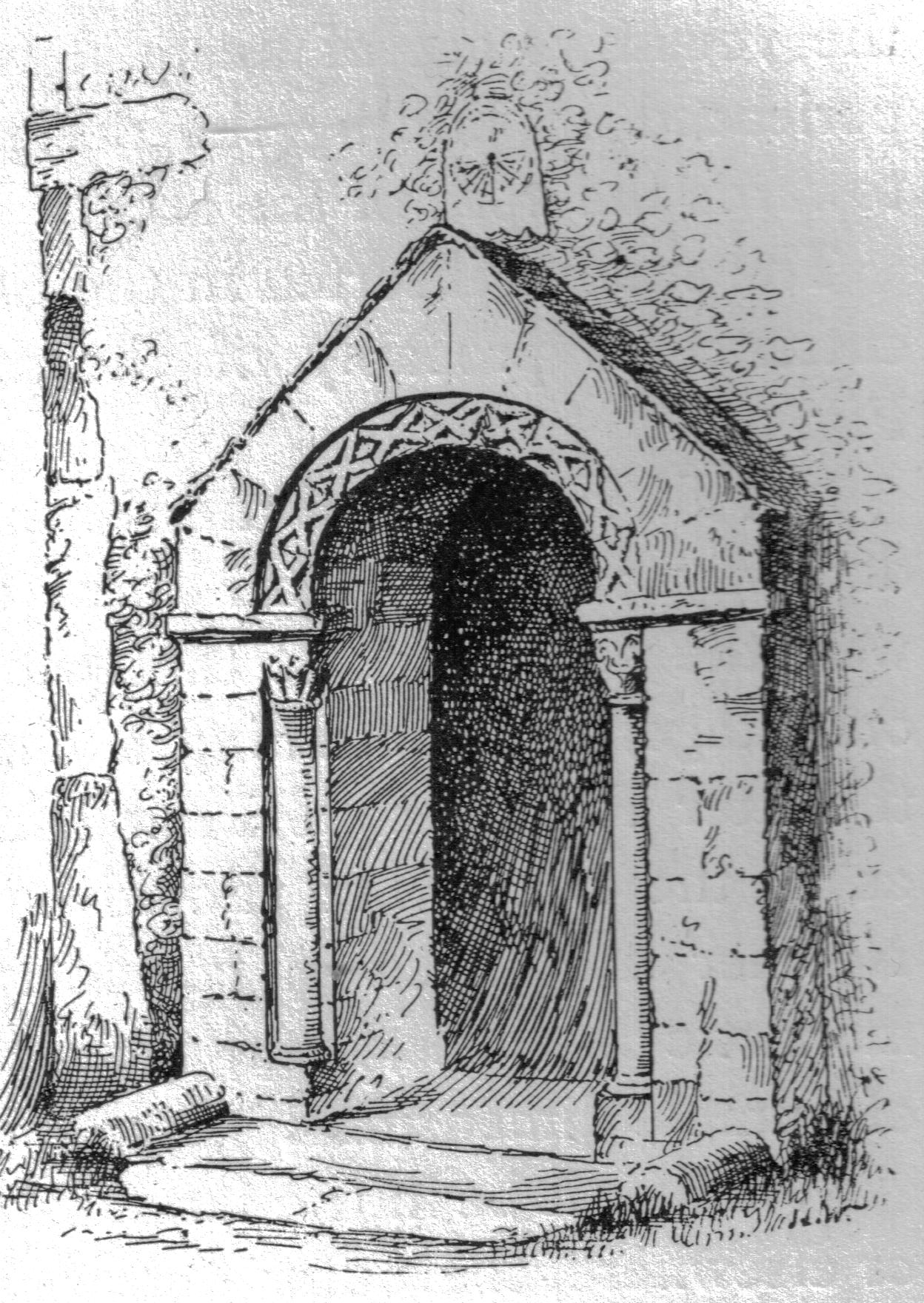
Bishopstone sundial and church porch in 1912.

Bishopstone is a rural village in the parish of Seaford, in Lewes district, in the county of East Sussex, England. Bishopstone Village has a population of about 200 people, including the nearby hamlet of Norton. It is located on a no-through country lane west of the town of Seaford, in the South Downs National Park.

== History ==
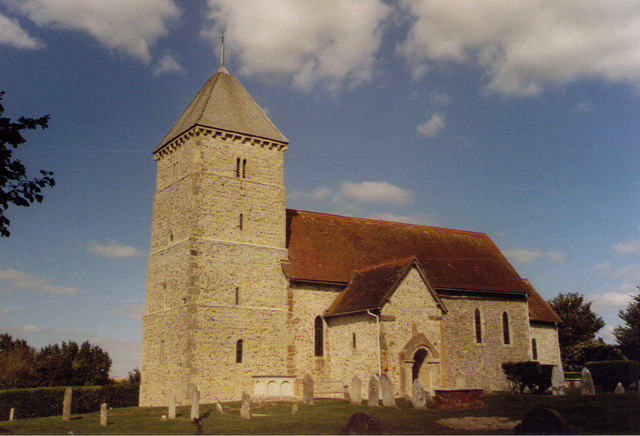
St Andrew's Church

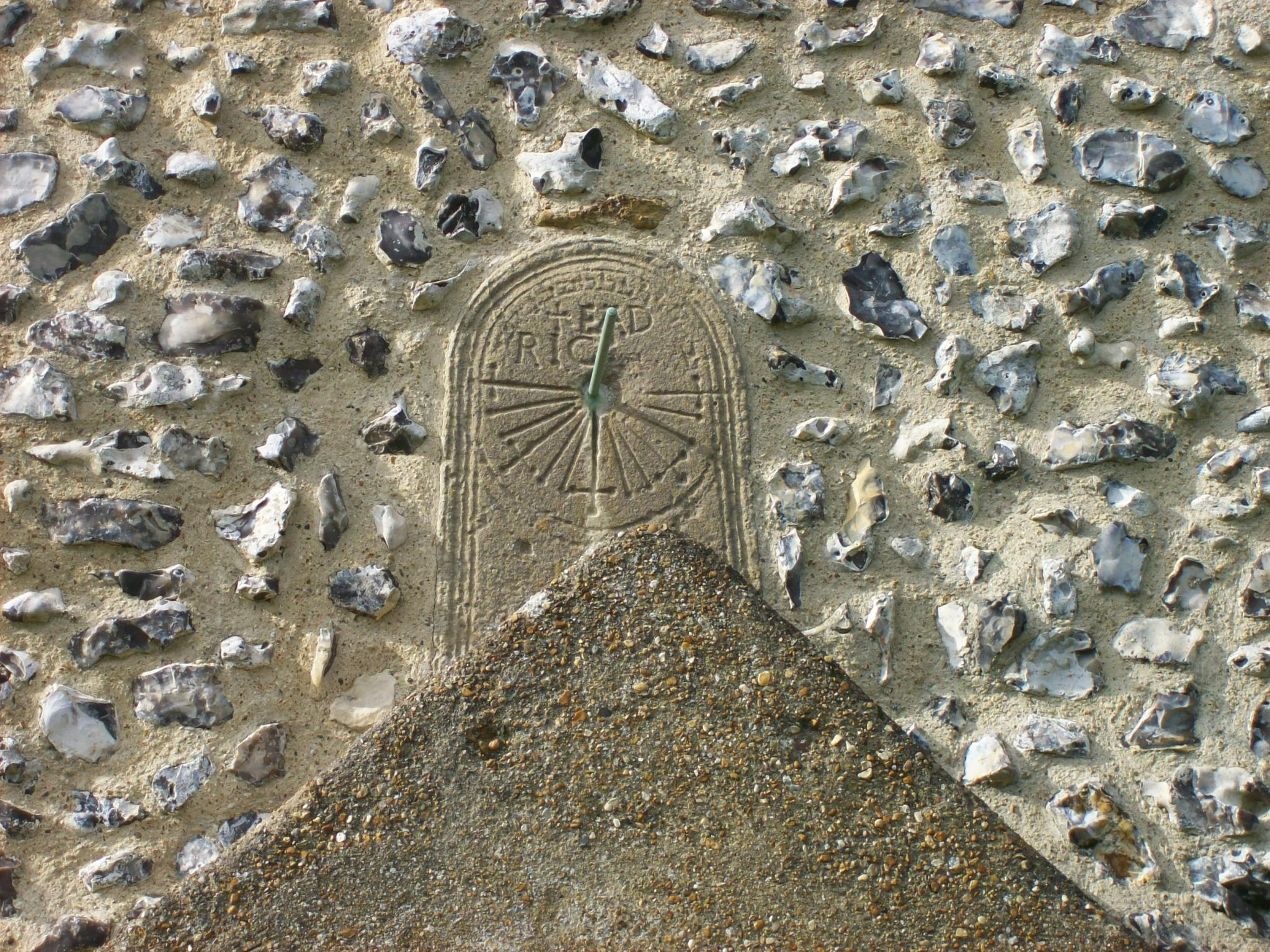
The medieval tide dial at St Andrew's, marking the canonical hours for its clerics

Bishopstone was an episcopal manor, hence its name meaning "dwelling place of the bishop". The church, dedicated to Saint Andrew, is thought to date from the 8th century, and may well be the oldest in the county. Bishopstone church has an ancient canonical sundial above its porch. The sundial is inscribed with the name Eadric, probably Eadric of Kent, the King of Kent in 685/6. The church was rebuilt in 1200.

The village was noted in the Domesday Book of 1086 as comprising 52 households, a significant settlement at the time. Ploughing land, pasture and had a value of £25; the tenant-in-chief was the Bishop of Chichester.

Over the centuries, as local government evolved, the hundred's responsibilities were phased out. Geographically, the area historically covered by the Flexborough Hundred now mostly falls within the Lewes District of East Sussex.

Bishopstone village hall is part of the village life and has local events, it is also the venue for the local table tennis club and is located behind the church.

In 1931 the parish had a population of 409. On 1 April 1934, the parish was abolished and merged with East Blatchington, Newhaven and South Heighton.

== Notable residents ==
In the 7th century the village is believed to have been the home of a saint, Leofwynn; she was venerated locally in the Dark Ages and medieval times.

- James Hurdis (1763-1801), the poet, was born in the village and there is a memorial to him in the church.
- Nell St. John Montague (1875-1944), the writer and "clairvoyante", is buried in Bishopstone, and her name is included on a memorial for the war dead (she died in London during a bombing in World War II).
- Kenneth V. Jones (1924-2020), composer, settled in Bishopstone in the early 1970s and lived there until he died.

== Transportation ==
Bishopstone is served by Bishopstone railway station, which replaced the original station, Bishopstone Beach Halt in 1942. Bishopstone station was built in 1938 in a distinctive red-brick Charles Holden Art-Deco style, a house style common to the Southern Railway at the time. An integrated pill box was added later above the roof early in World War 2 because of the defensive coverage it gave over nearby Seaford bay and beaches. From Bishopstone railway station there is a regular train service eastwards to Seaford, and north-westwards to Lewes, Brighton, Gatwick, and London.

== See also ==
- Tide Mills
