= Bishopstone Beach Halt railway station =

Railway station in East Sussex, England

Coordinates: 50.78474°N 0.07075°E

Bishopstone Beach Halt
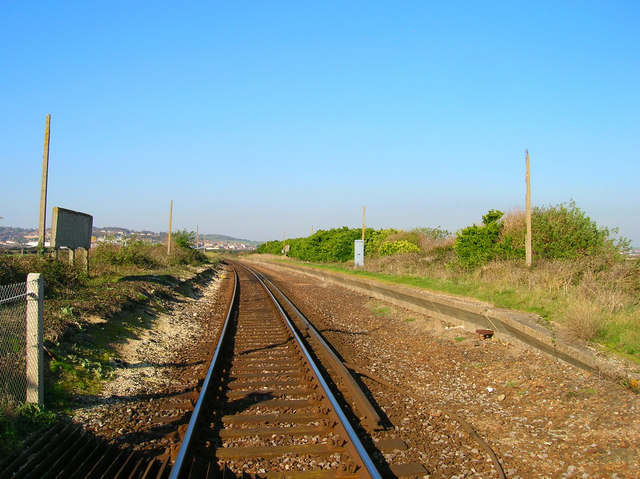
- Station site in 2007

General information
- Location: Bishopstone, Lewes District; England
- Grid reference: TQ46080039
- Platforms: 2

Other information
- Status: Disused

History
- Original company: London, Brighton and South Coast Railway
- Post-grouping: Southern Railway

Key dates
- 1 June 1864: Opened as Bishopstone
- 1 August 1922: Renamed Bishopstone Halt
- 26 September 1938: Closed
- 6 April 1939: Reopened and renamed Bishopstone Beach Halt
- 1 January 1942: Closed
Location

Bishopstone Beach Halt was a railway station in East Sussex, England that was opened on 1 June 1864 and closed on 1 January 1942. The station was built on the Seaford Branch Line for residents of the Bishopstone and Tide Mills villages and located on the west side of Mill Drove. The company that operated the trains on opening was the London Brighton & South Coast Railway, later merged into the Southern Railway.

== Reasons for construction ==
The station was built primarily for the 60-100 workers at the mills. After the mills closed 1883 it became used mainly by holiday passengers.

== History ==
The first name of the station was Bishopstone. It was closed in 1938 when a new Bishopstone station was built 0.6 miles (1 km) to the east, then reopened in 1939 as Bishopstone Beach Halt. It was then closed again in 1942.

Preceding station	Historical railways	Following station
Newhaven Harbour; Line open, station open	Southern Railway; Seaford Branch Line	Bishopstone; Line open, station open

== Present day ==
The down platform remains intact with no track running through it (as the line beyond Newhaven Harbour was singled in 1975). The edge stones on the up platform have been removed, but the concrete support of the station sign is still in place. The station can no longer be visited by the public.
