= Tide Mills, East Sussex =

Derelict village in East Sussex, England

Coordinates: 50.782865°N 0.0706°E

Tide Mills
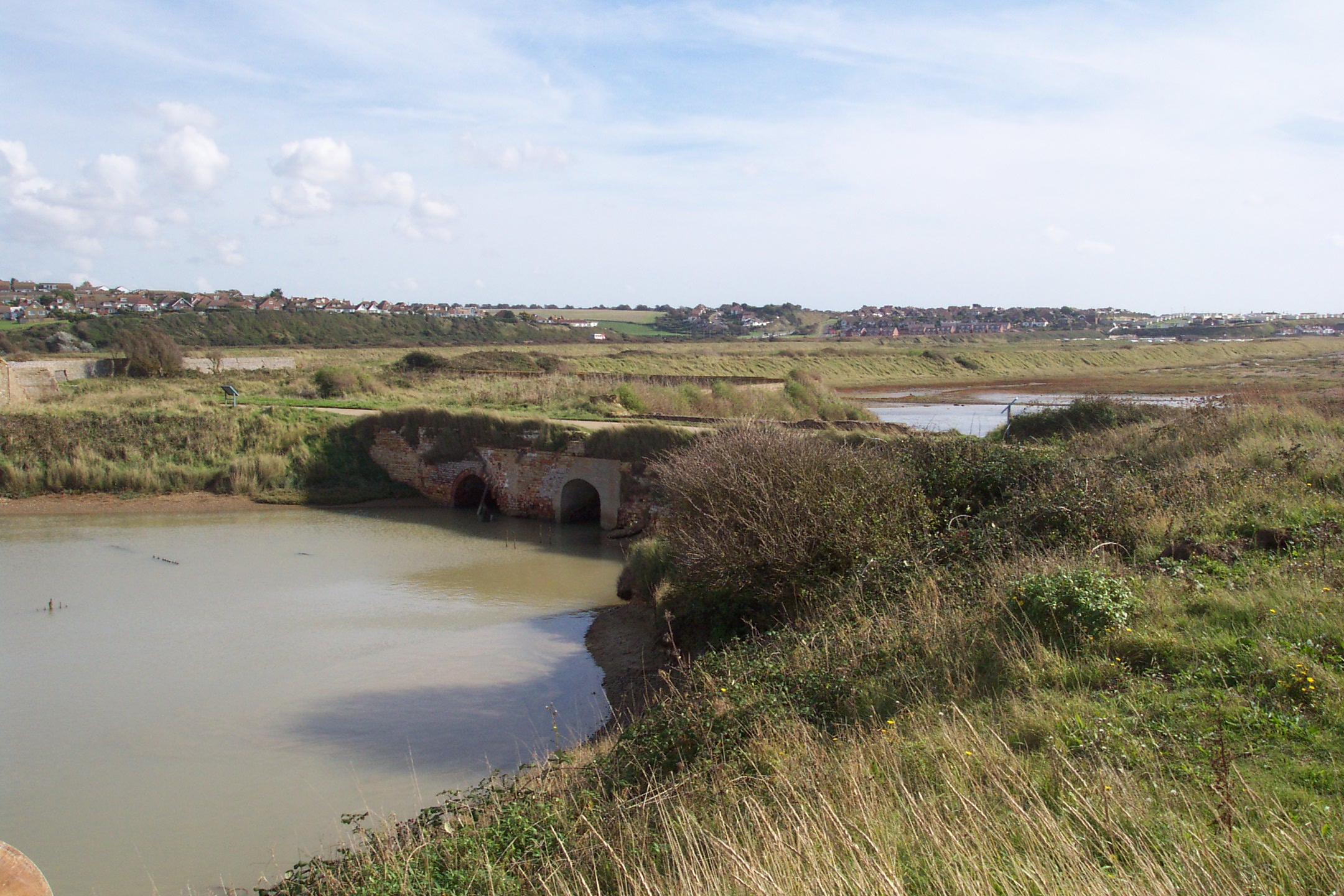
- The derelict mill race sluice, from the seaward side

- Location within East Sussex
- OS grid reference: TQ459002
  - London: 50 miles (80 km) N
- Civil parish: Seaford
- District: Lewes
- Shire county: East Sussex
- Region: South East
- Country: England
- Sovereign state: United Kingdom
- Police: Sussex
- Fire: East Sussex
- Ambulance: South East Coast
- UK Parliament: Lewes

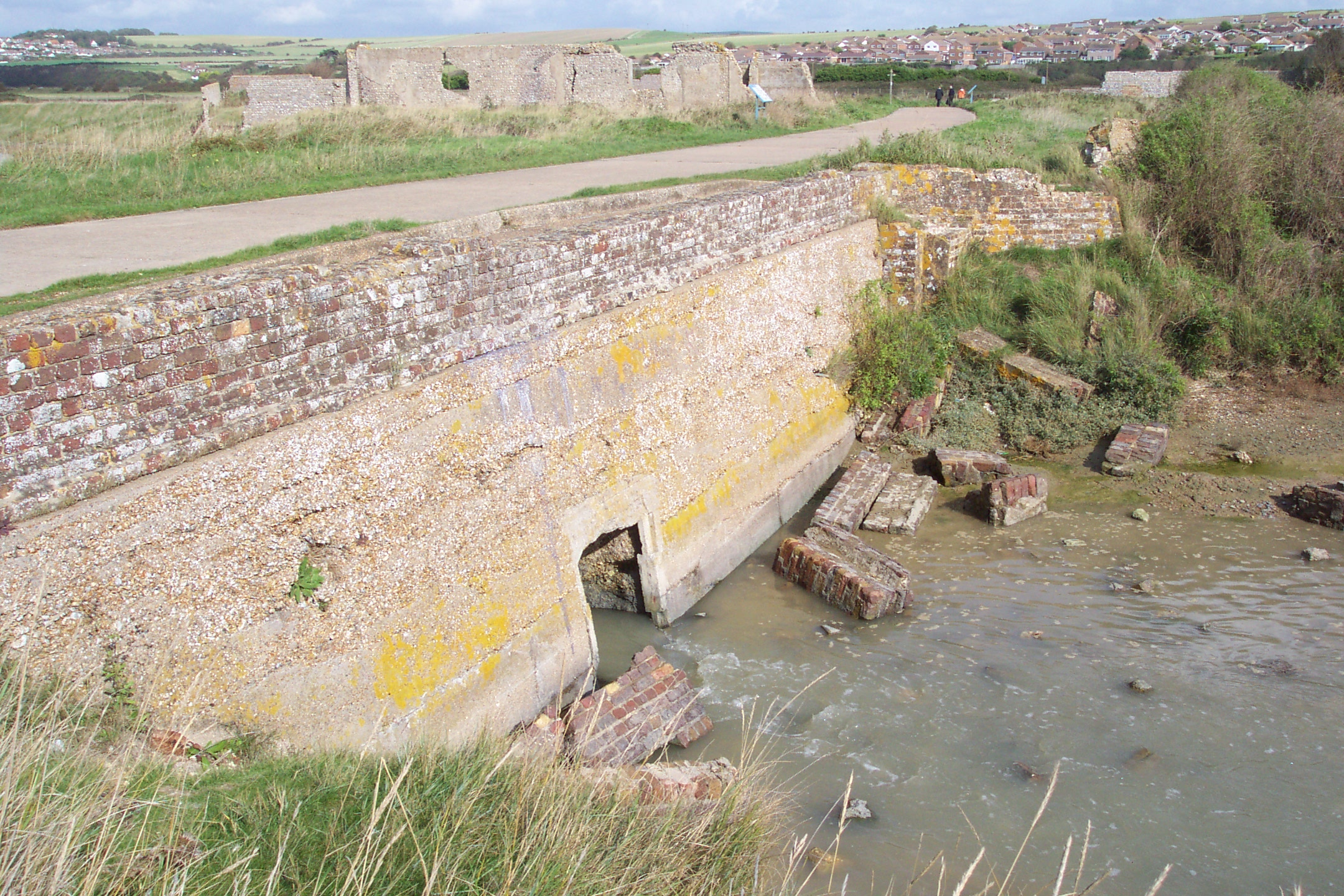
The derelict mill race sluice, from the mill pond side

Tide Mills is a derelict village in East Sussex, England. It lies about two kilometres (1.2 miles) south-east of Newhaven and four kilometres (2.5 miles) north-west of Seaford and is near both Bishopstone and East Blatchington. The village was condemned as unfit for habitation in 1936 and abandoned in 1939.

The last stationmaster at Tidemills was George Alce Foord who was born in 1873 in East Dean, Sussex.

== History ==
Bishopstone Tide Mills Act 1762
- Act of Parliament
- Parliament of Great Britain
- Long title: An Act for authorizing and enabling John Woods, William Woods, and John Challen, Merchants, to erect and build One or more Tide Mill or Tide Mills, for grinding Corn and Grain, upon a Creek or Channel in the Manor and Parish of Bishopston, in the County of Sussex.
- Citation: 2 Geo. 3. c. 12 Pr.
- Territorial extent: Great Britain

Dates
- Royal assent: 24 March 1762
- Commencement: 3 November 1761 (Note: Start of session.)

Status: Current legislation

Thomas Pelham, the politician and prime minister who also held the title Duke of Newcastle, owned land at Bishopstone, and obtained an act of Parliament, the Bishopstone Tide Mills Act 1762 (2 Geo. 3. c. 12 Pr.) that allowed him to use the foreshore of this land for the site of a tide mill. Construction began in 1762, but Pelham died in 1768, and it was not completed until 1788. Three years later, it was advertised for sale in the Sussex Weekly Advertiser, and at the time contained five pairs of mill stones, which could produce 130 quarters (1.65 tonnes) of wheat each week. The exposed location was often a problem, and in 1792 large quantities of flour and wheat were destroyed when the site was hit by a violent storm.

Thomas Barton bought the mill site, and embarked on a series of improvements to make the mill more efficient. He constructed a new three-storey mill building, to house 16 pairs of stones, with which he was able to produce 1,500 sacks (190 tonnes) of flour per week. Ownership changed as a series of partnerships were created and then dissolved. Barton was in partnership with Edmund Catt just prior to 1800, but the London Gazette in 1801 announced that the agreement was no longer in place. Catt then entered into an agreement with his cousin William Catt (1770–1853), but William dissolved this in 1807. William Catt was part of a family with many farming and milling interests in Robertsbridge and Buxted, and was a keen businessman. He managed the mill well, and it became very profitable, despite the occasional storm damage, such as that in 1820 which damaged the mill building, and washed away some of the mill dam.

According to the census data from 1851, there were 60 men working at the mill, and most of them lived in cottages that Catt had built around the site. He also built a school to educate the children, and although the conditions were rather rudimentary, a thriving community developed. The workers appreciated the facilities provided for their families, at a time when such provision was not common. After the railway line from Newhaven to Seaford was opened, a siding was constructed, which ran between the cottages, enabling large quantities of flour to be transported to Newhaven, from where much of it was shipped to London by sea.

The Mill closed in 1883 and was used as bonded warehouses until it was pulled down in 1901. In 1936 the Seaford council took action to declare part of Tide Mills, houses numbered 8 to 13, a clearance area within the meaning of the Housing Act 1930. The council seems to have been especially concerned about the alleged sanitary defects of these houses. Water came from a single standpipe shared by all six houses, general waste from the houses was removed and thrown into the sea, and each house had a small outside building containing an earth closet whose contents had to be emptied and carried to the sea.

The order confirming the clearance was confirmed by Seaford council early in 1937, and the occupants of the houses were required to vacate them within nine months. The last residents were forcibly removed in 1939, the shingle beach being needed for defensive purposes during World War Two. The area was in part cleared to give fields of fire and also used for street fighting training. The site was not used for target practice by Newhaven Fort Artillery, though this story is common locally. The area accommodated vast numbers of Canadian troops during the Second World War.

There are the remains of a station on the Newhaven to Seaford line at grid reference TQ460003. It started life as either Bishopstone Station (the Victorian OS map of 1874 shows it as this together with a short branch line to the mills) or Tide Mills Halt, but became Bishopstone Beach Halt in 1939 before its closure in 1942. This is different from today's Bishopstone railway station at grid reference TV469998.

The Sussex Archaeological Society started a long-term project in April 2006 to record the entire East Beach site: Mills, Railway Station, Nurses Home, Hospital, RNAS Station and the later holiday homes and the Marconi Radio station (1904). Apart from the dig, it will evolve into a large collection of film, video, recollections and photographs logging the decline of the area.

== Mill complex ==
Photograph showing a windmill in addition to the tide mill complex

Old photographs and paintings, together with a poem, show that the Tide Mill complex included a windmill.

== Access ==
Access is via either Mill Drove, an insignificant single-track road that runs south-west from the Newhaven and Seaford roads at approximately the point where one changes into the other grid reference TQ463005 (very limited parking, and access is via a pedestrian railway crossing at Bishopstone Beach Halt); or along the beach to the east of Newhaven Harbour. Network Rail plans to build a new footbridge across the railway to replace the existing crossing.

== In popular culture ==
The Tide Mills features in the 2007 novel A Kind of Vanishing by crime-writer Lesley Thomson. Two girls are playing hide-and-seek in the summer of 1968. Eleanor is hiding from Alice, who never comes looking for her. Alice disappears and more than thirty years later she is still missing. Much of the "action" takes place around the Tide Mills. The cover photograph for the UK edition published by Myriad Editions shows a shot of the Tide Mills.

It also features in a novel of 2018. Set in 1963–4, Change at Tide Mills uses a version of the Mill and village that is still standing. In practice, it was demolished in 1940. A family from London revitalises the Mill's fortunes and the main storylines use local landmarks and contemporary values. The author also offers a talk using contemporary images to flesh out the actual site and surroundings.

It is also featured in the poem "Tide Mills", written by Minoli Salgado for the 2021 Arts Council England-funded project Your Local Arena. The poem was inspired by a 2009 BBC Arena documentary on T. S. Eliot.

== See also ==
- Watermills in the United Kingdom
