= Bishopstone railway station =

Railway station in East Sussex, England

Coordinates: 50.780°N 0.083°E

Bishopstone
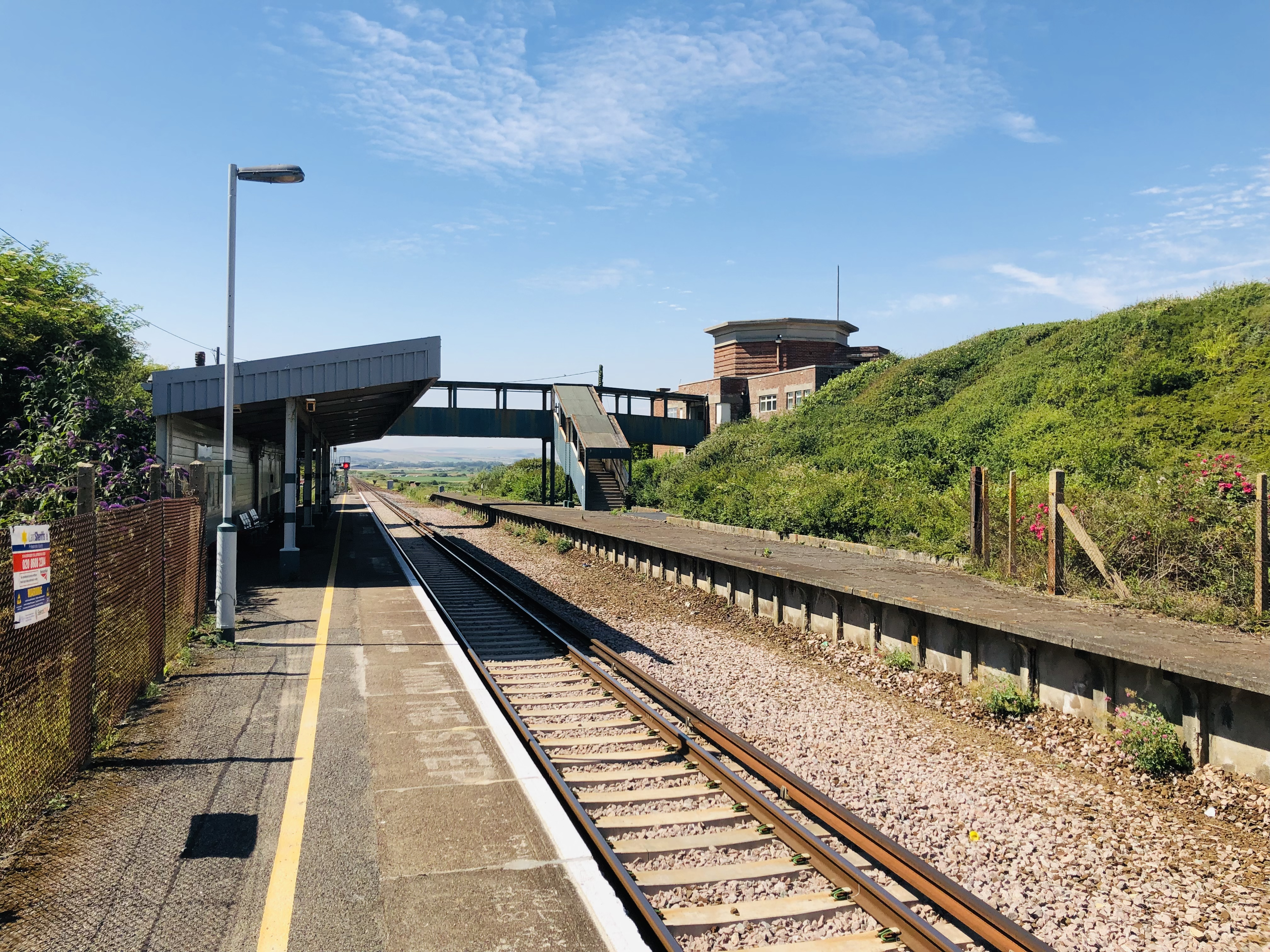
- The platform at Bishopstone, looking west

General information
- Location: Seaford, Lewes, East Sussex; England
- Grid reference: TV469998
- Owner: Network Rail
- Manager: Southern
- Platforms: 1

Other information
- Station code: BIP
- Classification: DfT category F2

History
- Post-grouping: Southern Railway

Key dates
- 26 September 1938: Opened
- 1975: Reduced to single track

Passengers
- 2021/22: ▲36,450
- 2022/23: ▲43,104
- 2023/24: ▲47,000
- 2024/25: ▲51,166
- 2025/26: ▲59,152
Location
Notes
- Passenger statistics from the Office of Rail and Road

Bishopstone railway station is on the western side of the town of Seaford, East Sussex, England. It is situated close to the coast, and about 1 mile (1.6 km) from the downland rural village of Bishopstone after which it is named. Train services from the station are provided by Southern, and the station is on the Seaford Branch of the East Coastway Line, 58 miles 3 chains (93.4 km) measured from London Bridge.

Before this station opened, the first Bishopstone station was 0.6 miles (1 km) further west at Tide Mills. That was closed in 1938, when the current station opened, but was subsequently reopened under the name of Bishopstone Beach Halt, and survived as such until 1942.

== Buildings and structures ==
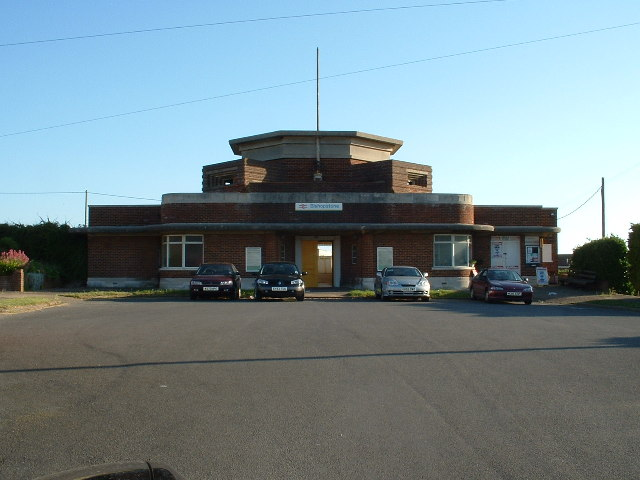
The station building

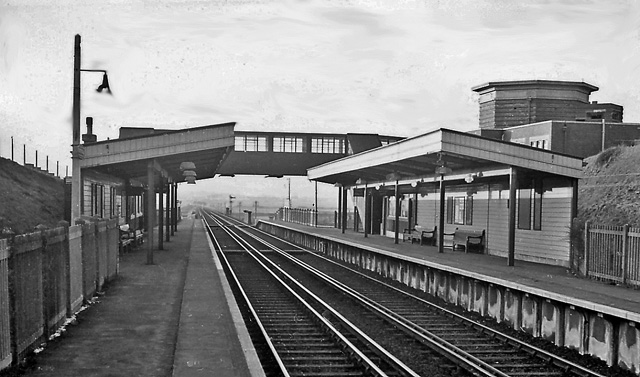
View westward, towards Newhaven and Lewes in 1967

The present station was designed by the architect James Robb Scott and opened on 26 September 1938, the same day that the original Bishopstone station at Tide Mills was first closed. The Art Deco design is said to be inspired by that of Arnos Grove tube station, which was designed by Charles Holden, and was intended to be the centrepiece of a proposed residential development that never took place due to the outbreak of the Second World War.

The main building of the station is symmetrical, with an octagonal central booking hall and two extended wings. One of these wings formerly contained the ticket office and parcels office, and the other contained a waiting room and toilets. As-built, the station had two side platforms in a cutting, accessed by stairs from a footbridge linking to the main station building.

In 1940, a pair of pillboxes was built on the roof of the main station building, flanking its octagonal tower. Despite the times, considerable effort was made to blend these into the original structure, and they are thus well camouflaged.

The last member of staff, station manager Una Shearing, was withdrawn in 1988. The old booking office and parcel office was restored in 2022 in phase 1 of a restoration project with the support of Friends of Bishopstone Station. This is now run by the Friends as The Old Parcel Room Community hub. The remaining station facilities will be restored in phase 2 of the project. The main access to the trains is still accessed via the octagonal booking hall, which is top lit by glass pavement lights supported by a concrete grid. The line was singled in 1975 and all trains now use the former up platform.

Bishopstone Station is a grade II listed building, which is on English Heritage's at-risk register.

== Services ==
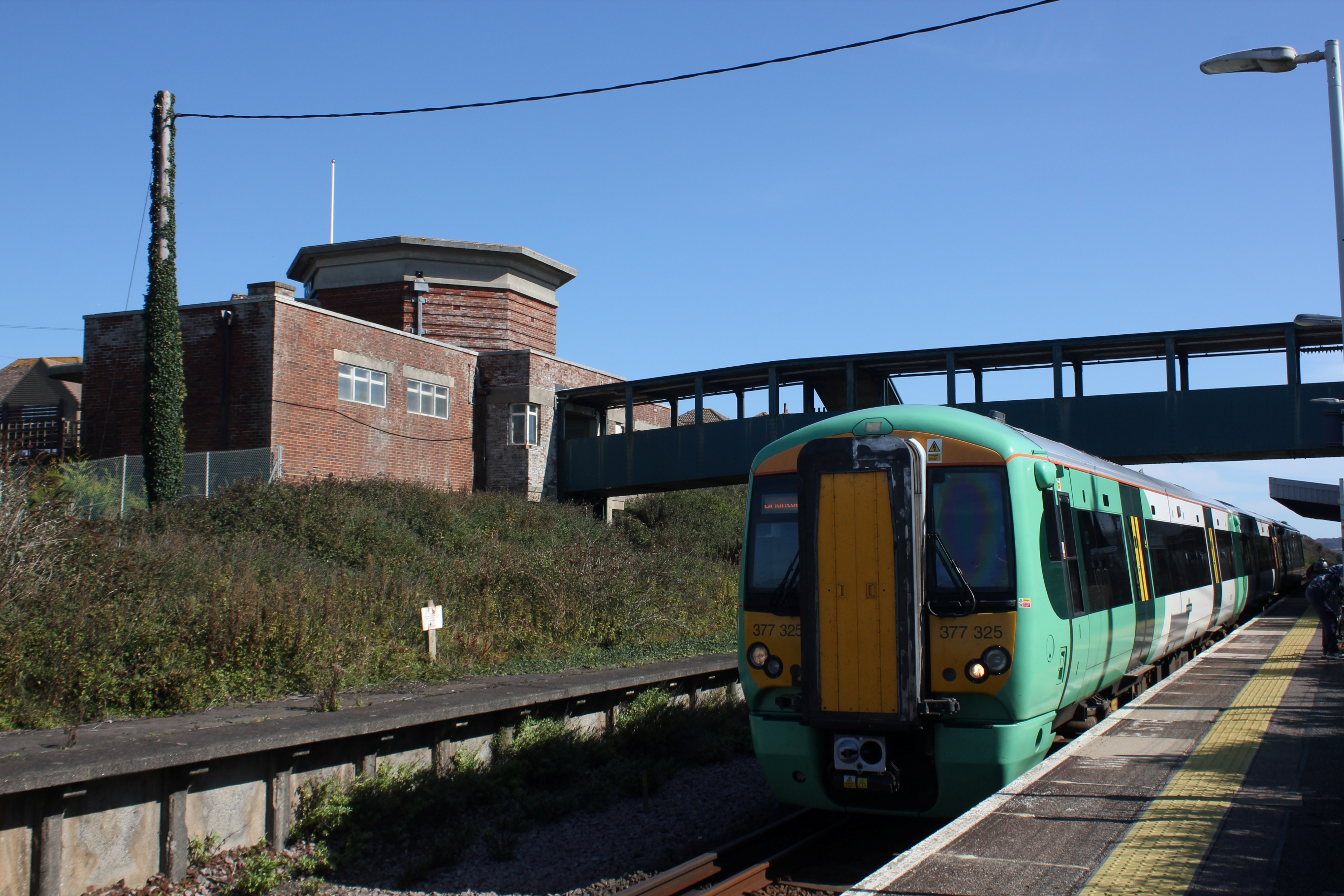
A Class 377 'Electrostar' at Bishopstone with a Southern service bound for Brighton

All services at Bishopstone are operated by Southern using Class 377 EMUs.

The typical off-peak service in trains per hour is:

- 2 tph to Brighton via Lewes
- 2 tph to Seaford

Connections with services to Gatwick Airport and London Victoria can be made by changing at Lewes.

Preceding station	National Rail	Following station
Newhaven Harbour or Newhaven Town	Southern Seaford Branch Line	Seaford
	Historical railways	
Bishopstone Beach Halt Line open, station closed	Southern Railway Seaford Branch Line	Seaford Line and station open

== Incidents ==
On 3 July 1940, Luftwaffe fighter aircraft machine-gunned and bombed a train near Bishopstone Station. The train driver was killed and several passengers were wounded.
