= L1 =

L1, L01, L.1, L 1 or L-1 may refer to:

== Mathematics, science and technology ==
=== Math ===
- L_{1} distance in mathematics, used in taxicab geometry
- L^{1}, the space of Lebesgue integrable functions
- ℓ^{1}, the space of absolutely convergent sequences
- Lasso (statistics), a means of regression analysis used in statistics and machine learning

=== Science ===
- L1 family, a protein family of cell adhesion molecules
- L1 (protein), a cell adhesion molecule
- L1 or LINE1; transposable elements in the DNA
- L_{1}, Lagrangian point 1, the most intuitive position for an object to be gravitationally stationary relative to two larger objects (such as a satellite with respect to the Earth and Moon)
- Anthranilic acid, also called vitamin L1
- The first lumbar vertebra of the vertebral column in human anatomy
- The first larval stage in the Caenorhabditis elegans worm development

=== Technology ===
- L1, one of the frequencies used by GPS systems (see GPS frequencies)
- L1, the common name for the Soviet space effort known formally as Soyuz 7K-L1, designed to launch men from the Earth to circle the Moon without going into lunar orbit
- ISO/IEC 8859-1 (Latin-1), an 8-bit character encoding
- An L-carrier cable system developed by AT&T
- The level-1 CPU cache in a computer
- Sony Xperia L1, an Android smartphone
- A class of FM broadcast station in North America

== Transportation and military ==
- Lehrgeschwader 1, from its historic Geschwaderkennung code with the Luftwaffe in World War II
- Lufthansa Systems' IATA code
- Lawrance L-1, a predecessor of the 1920s American Lawrance J-1 aircraft engine
- L1 Dulwich Hill Line on the Inner West Light Rail, a light rail service in Sydney, Australia
- L1 (New York City bus), a temporary bus route in New York City
- Volkswagen L1, a Volkswagen concept hybrid car
- L1A1 Self-Loading Rifle
- L1, an S-Bahn line of the Léman Express in Switzerland and France
- G:link (numbered L1), a light rail line on the Gold Coast, Australia
- L (SEPTA Metro), a heavy rail line in Philadelphia which offers L1 service

=== Locomotives ===
- Erie L-1, an American 0-8-8-0 steam locomotive class
- GCR Class 1B, latterly known as LNER Class L1, a class of British 2-6-4T steam locomotives
- GNR Class L1, latterly known as LNER Class R1, a class of British 0-8-2T steam locomotives
- LNER Thompson Class L1, a class of British 2-6-4T steam locomotives
- NCC Class L1, a Northern Counties Committee 0-6-0 class steam locomotive
- Pennsylvania Railroad class L1s, an American 2-8-2 steam locomotive class
- Soo Line L-1 class, an American 2-8-2 steam locomotive class
- SP&S Class L-1, an American 4-4-0 steam locomotive class
- SR L1 class, a class of 4-4-0 steam locomotives of Great Britain
- VR Class Vr1 (originally L1), a Finnish steam locomotive class

=== Aircraft ===
- Arado L 1, a 1929 German two-seat parasol-wing sporting monoplane
- Macchi L.1, a 1915 Austro-Hungarian reconnaissance flying boat
- Stinson L-1 Vigilant, the US Army Air Forces designation for the Stinson Model 74 observation aircraft

=== Submarines ===
- USS L-1 (SS-40), a 1915 United States Navy L-class submarine
- HMS L1, a Royal Navy submarine

== Other ==
- Ligue 1, the top division of French football
- Lowest unique bid
- L1, in linguistics, a subject's first language or mother tongue
- L-1 Identity Solutions, a US face-recognition corporation
- L-1 visa, a document used to enter the United States for the purpose of work
- L1, an abbreviation denoting someone is a Level 1 Judge, in reference to Magic: The Gathering
- Bose L1 Portable Systems
- L=1, a lunar eclipse classification on the Danjon scale
- L1, the postcode for central Liverpool, a major UK city
- L1 or Lucifer (2019 Indian film), a 2019 Indian political action thriller film, followed by L2: Empuraan
- L1 (broadcaster), the public broadcaster for the Dutch province Limburg

Containing L1

- ATC code L01 Antineoplastic agents, a subgroup of the Anatomical Therapeutic Chemical Classification System
- Barcelona Metro line 1
- DSC-L1, a 2004 Sony Cyber-shot L series camera model
- Haplogroup L1 (mtDNA), a human mitochondrial haplogroup from Africa
- Luxo L-1, a lamp
- Panasonic Lumix DMC-L1, a 2006 single-lens reflex camera

== See also ==
- Level 1 (disambiguation)
- 1L (disambiguation)
