= SECR L and SR L1 classes =

SECR L and SR L1 classes may refer to:

- SECR L class – a class of 4-4-0 locomotives built for the South Eastern and Chatham Railway (SECR) in 1914
- SR L1 class – a class of 4-4-0 locomotives built for the Southern Railway (SR) in 1926
