= 1L =

1l or 1-L may refer to:

- first-line medical treatment, 1L treatment, first-line therapy (2L, 3L, etc.)
- Marawing 1-L Malamut, Czech ultralight aircraft
- Toyota 1L
- Volkswagen 1-litre car
- First year law school student in the United States
- Liberland radio prefix

== See also ==
- L1 (disambiguation)
