= ZNP-FM =

Radio station

- Nassau, Bahamas; Bahamas
- Broadcast area: New Providence, Bahamas
- Frequency: 107.5 MHz
- Branding: Peace 107.5 FM

Programming
- Format: soft rock, classic hits, easy listening/adult contemporary

Ownership
- Owner: The McKinney Media Group, Limited

History
- Call sign meaning: ZN (former ITU prefix under United Kingdom rule) Peace FM

Technical information
- ERP: 1,000 watts
- HAAT: 35 meters (115 ft)
- Transmitter coordinates: 25°02′44″N 77°19′05″W

Links
- Webcast: Listen Live
- Website: Official website

ZNP-FM is a soft rock/easy listening radio station in Nassau, Bahamas. In addition to music, the station airs news, weather reports, town hall meetings, conventions and other community radio programs.
