= ZNJY-FM =

Radio station

- Nassau, Bahamas; Bahamas
- Broadcast area: New Providence, Bahamas
- Frequency: 101.9 MHz
- Branding: 101.9 Joy FM

Programming
- Format: Gospel music

History
- First air date: 1999
- Call sign meaning: ZN (former ITU prefix under United Kingdom rule) JoY FM

Technical information
- ERP: 1,000 watts
- HAAT: 35 meters (115 ft)
- Transmitter coordinates: 25°02′44″N 77°19′05″W

Links
- Webcast: Listen Live

ZNJY-FM is a Gospel music radio station in Nassau, Bahamas.
