= ZNNT-FM =

Radio station

ZNNG-FM
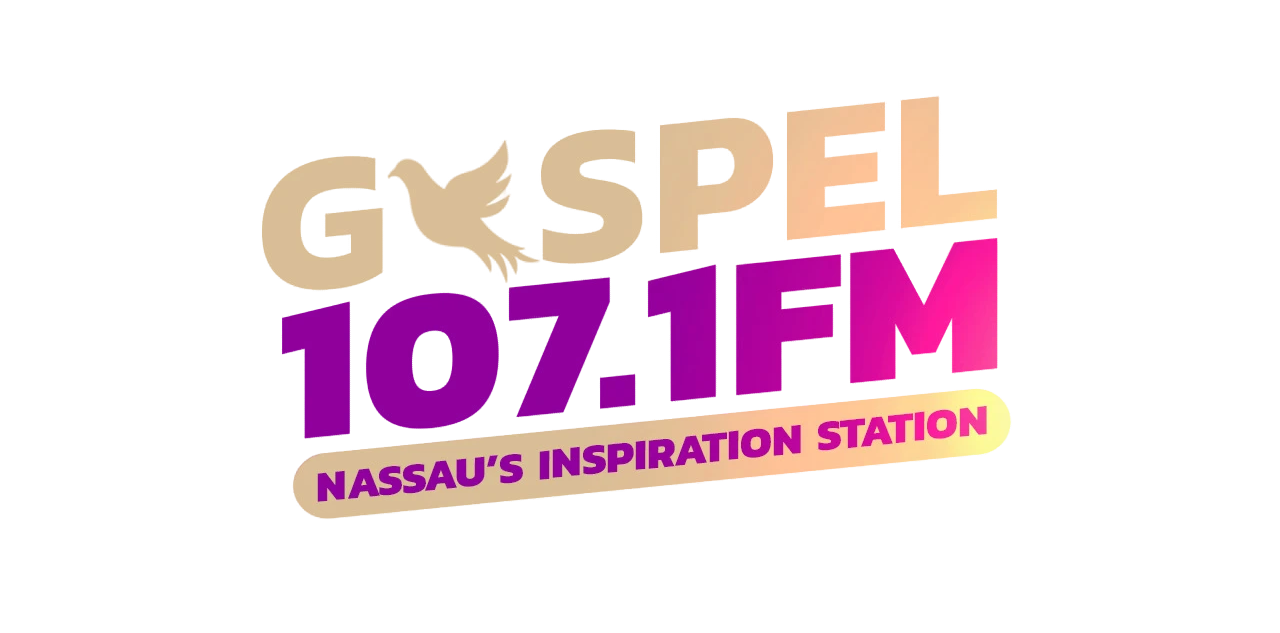
- Nassau, Bahamas; Bahamas
- Broadcast area: New Providence, Bahamas
- Frequency: Online
- Branding: GOSPEL 107.1

Programming
- Format: Gospel music, religious broadcasting

History
- Call sign meaning: ZN (former ITU prefix under United Kingdom rule)

Technical information
- HAAT: 35 meters (115 ft)
- Transmitter coordinates: 25°02′44″N 77°19′05″W

Links
- Website: https://www.gospel107.cc/

ZNNG-FM is a religious radio station in Nassau, Bahamas, more popularly known as GOSPEL 107.1.
