= ZNI-FM =

Radio station

ZNY-FM

Nassau, Bahamas; Bahamas
- Broadcast area: New Providence, Bahamas
- Frequency: 102.9 MHz
- Branding: Island 102.9 FM

Programming
- Format: Caribbean music

Ownership
- Owner: Carter Broadcasting Bahamas, Limited

History
- First air date: 1999
- Call sign meaning: ZN (former ITU prefix under United Kingdom rule) Island FM

Technical information
- ERP: 5,000 watts
- HAAT: 35 meters (115 ft)
- Transmitter coordinates: 25°02′44″N 77°19′05″W

Links
- Webcast: Listen Live
- Website: Official website

ZNY-FM is a Caribbean music radio station in Nassau, Bahamas.
