= ZFD-FM =

Radio station

Dove 103.7-FM
- Freeport, Bahamas; Bahamas
- Broadcast area: Grand Bahama, Bahamas
- Frequency: 103.7 MHz
- Branding: Dove FM

Programming
- Format: Religious

History
- Call sign meaning: ZF (former ITU prefix under United Kingdom rule) Dove FM

Technical information
- ERP: 5,000 watts
- Transmitter coordinates: 26°31′42″N 78°41′04″W

Links
- Webcast: Official website
- Website: Official website

Dove 103.7-FM is a religious radio station in Freeport, Bahamas.
