= ZNGR-FM =

Radio station

- Nassau, Bahamas; Bahamas
- Broadcast area: New Providence, Bahamas
- Frequency: 96.9 MHz
- Branding: Guardian Talk Radio

Programming
- Format: all-news radio/Talk radio

History
- First air date: April 10, 2012
- Call sign meaning: ZN (former ITU prefix under United Kingdom rule) Guardian Radio

Technical information
- ERP: 1,000 watts
- HAAT: 35 meters (115 ft)
- Transmitter coordinates: 25°02′44″N 77°19′05″W

Links
- Webcast: https://radio.streamcomedia.com/station/tngr969fm/player.html
- Website: http://www.guardiantalkradio.com/

ZNGR-FM is a news/talk radio station in Nassau, Bahamas. The station was launched on April 10, 2012.
