= ZNGF-FM =

Radio station

- Nassau, Bahamas; Bahamas
- Broadcast area: New Providence, Bahamas
- Frequency: 105.9 MHz
- Branding: Gems Radio 105.9 FM

Programming
- Format: Rhythm & Blues

History
- Call sign meaning: ZN (former ITU prefix under United Kingdom rule) Gems FM

Technical information
- ERP: 5,000 watts
- HAAT: 35 meters (115 ft)
- Transmitter coordinates: 25°02′44″N 77°19′05″W

ZNGF-FM is a Rhythm and Blues radio station in Nassau, Bahamas.
