= ZFC-FM =

Radio station

- Freeport, Bahamas; Bahamas
- Broadcast area: Grand Bahama, Bahamas
- Frequency: 96.1 MHz
- Branding: Cool 96 FM

Programming
- Format: Variety hits

History
- First air date: 2004
- Call sign meaning: ZF (former ITU prefix under United Kingdom rule) Cool FM

Technical information
- ERP: 5,000 watts
- Transmitter coordinates: 26°32′29″N 78°42′02″W

ZFC-FM is a Variety hits station serving Freeport and Grand Bahama in The Bahamas. It is unknown if the station is currently operating.
