= ZNST-FM =

Radio station

- Nassau, Bahamas; Bahamas
- Broadcast area: New Providence, Bahamas
- Frequency: 106.5 MHz
- Branding: Star 106.5 FM - Hits

Programming
- Format: Urban contemporary

History
- Call sign meaning: ZN (former ITU prefix under United Kingdom rule) STar FM

Technical information
- ERP: 5,000 watts
- HAAT: 35 meters (115 ft)
- Transmitter coordinates: 25°02′44″N 77°19′05″W

Links
- Webcast: https://ice26.securenetsystems.net/STAR106FM
- Website: Official website

ZNST-FM is an R&B radio station in Nassau, Bahamas.
