= ZNGB-FM =

Radio station

Nassau, Bahamas; Bahamas
- Broadcast area: New Providence, Bahamas
- Frequency: 99.5 MHz
- Branding: Global 99.5FM Bahamas

Programming
- Format: adult contemporary

History
- Call sign meaning: ZN (former ITU prefix under United Kingdom rule) GloBal

Technical information
- ERP: 1,000 watts
- HAAT: 35 meters (115 ft)
- Transmitter coordinates: 25°02′44″N 77°19′05″W

Links
- Website: Official website

ZNGB-FM is an adult contemporary radio station in Nassau, Bahamas. Somewhat uniquely, the station has two internet feeds on its website: one for Nassau, and one for Freeport.
