= Newhaven Marine railway station =

Closed railway station in East Sussex, England

Newhaven Marine
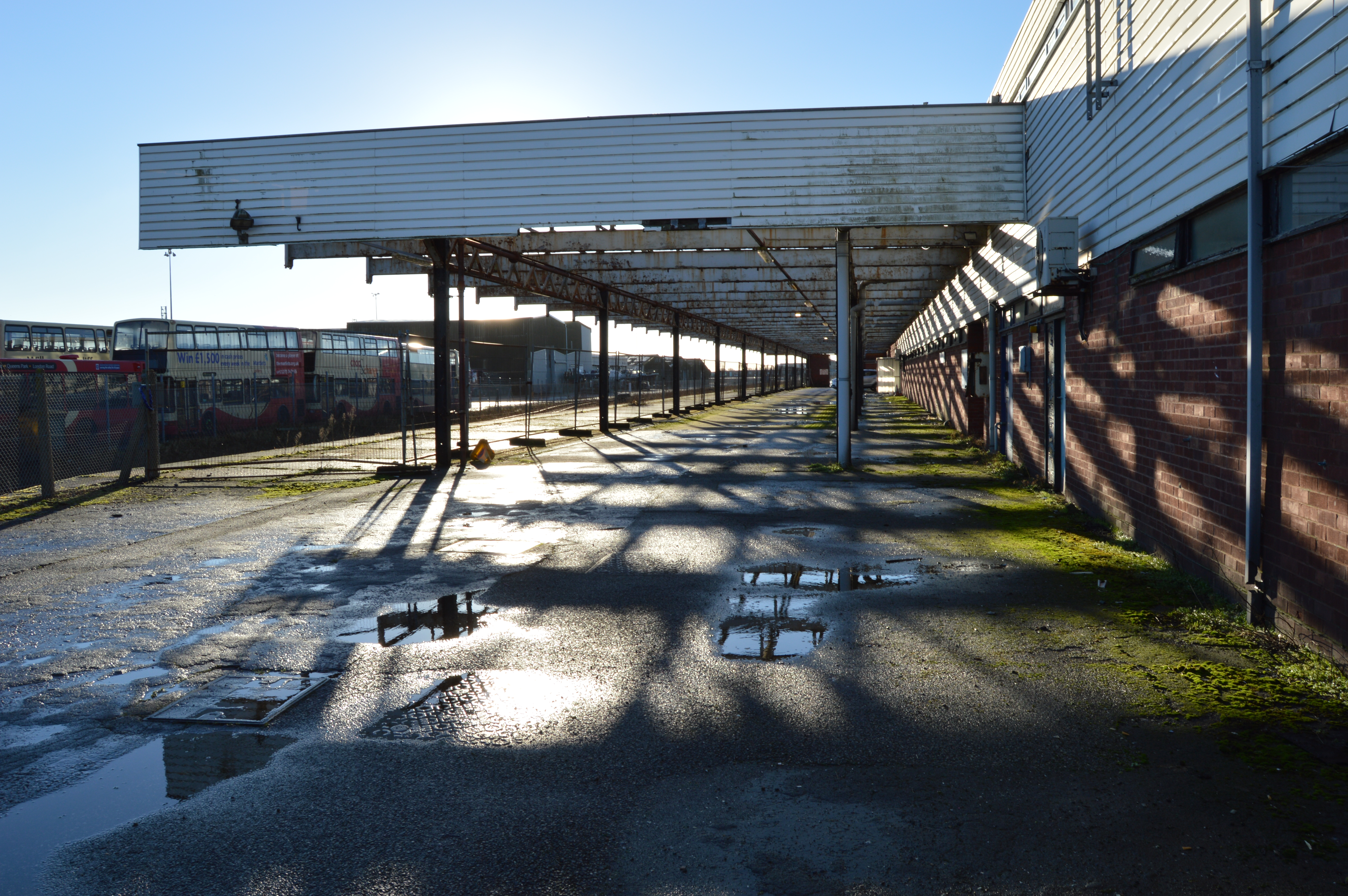
- The entrance to the platform at Newhaven Marine before demolition of the station in 2017.

General information
- Location: Newhaven, East Sussex; England
- Coordinates: 50.7875°N 0.0566°E
- Grid reference: TQ450006
- Platforms: 1

Other information
- Status: Disused

History
- Original company: LB&SCR
- Pre-grouping: LB&SCR
- Post-grouping: Southern Railway

Key dates
- 17 May 1886: Opened as Newhaven Harbour (Boat Station)
- 14 May 1984: Renamed Newhaven Marine
- August 2006: Services suspended on safety grounds
- May 2017: Station buildings demolished
- 22 October 2020: Officially closed
Location

Newhaven Marine railway station was a station in Newhaven, East Sussex, England, at the end of a short branch off the Seaford branch line near Newhaven Harbour. It was the last station to open in Newhaven, in 1886, following redevelopment and expansion of the Port of Newhaven and served cross-Channel boat trains to Dieppe, France.

The station went into decline after the ferry terminal was moved away from it in 1984, and boat train services declined generally after the Channel Tunnel opened in 1994. It was closed to passengers in 2006 on safety grounds, but remained legally open, serving inaccessible parliamentary trains until it was formally closed in 2020. The branch remains open for freight traffic, as well as for a small number of reversing trains at peak times (which terminate at Newhaven Harbour) and for special excursion services.

== Location ==
The station was adjacent to the Port of Newhaven at the edge of a branch line south of Newhaven Harbour station, where the main line continues to Seaford.

The single platform of Newhaven Marine was numbered 3, which dates from when it was considered part of Newhaven Harbour station (which used platforms 1 and 2). It was long enough for 12 coaches, and was 16 chains (320 m) to the south of Newhaven Harbour (56 miles 67 chains (91.5 km) measured from London Bridge via Redhill).

== History ==
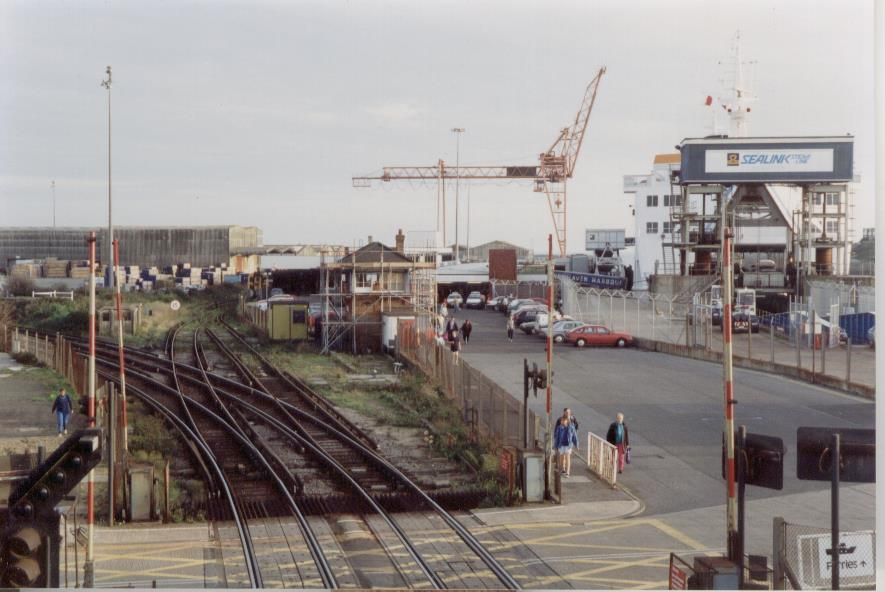
Looking towards the station and a Sealink ferry from Newhaven Harbour

The first station to serve cross-Channel traffic, adjacent to the ferry terminal, was named Newhaven Wharf which opened with the line from Lewes on 8 December 1847. It was a terminal station until 1864, when the line was extended to Seaford.

On 17 May 1886, the London, Brighton and South Coast Railway opened a station further south that was built on reclaimed land south of Mill Creek, and provided a more direct access to boat train services that did not have to depend on tide times. The earlier station was renamed Newhaven Harbour and the new station called Newhaven Harbour (Boat Station). The line was electrified by the Southern Railway, with work completed on 16 July 1947, with regular electric boat train services from London Victoria beginning on 15 May 1949.

Newhaven Marine had regular services from Victoria with connections for ferry passengers travelling to Dieppe in France. An occasional InterCity service ran to Manchester Piccadilly. The ferry terminal was relocated further north in the 1980s closer to Newhaven Town, removing Newhaven Marine's principal importance, and services to the station were progressively reduced. The last boat train to run from this station was on 14 May 1984, a British Rail SR V class 4-4-0 steam service. On the same date, the station was renamed Newhaven Marine. Demand for the station was further reduced by the opening of the Channel Tunnel in 1994 leading to a general fall in demand of boat train services.

== Parliamentary service ==
The station was closed to the public in August 2006, due to safety concerns over the condition of the roof canopy, which was later removed. Trains continued to run along the line with a single evening service, stopping at the station platform and reversing back to Newhaven Harbour, but impossible for passengers to access the train. (Note: In 2012, the service left Newhaven Harbour at 19:55, stopping at Newhaven Marine at 19:57, leaving there at 20:15 and arriving at Newhaven Harbour at 20:16)

Attention was brought to the situation by a BBC Radio 4 programme in October 2010, The Ghost Trains of Old England, and the station became well known among railway enthusiasts for its unusual status. The station was interesting because of parliamentary train services to the station that appeared in timetables but were inaccessible to the public, and which nonetheless called at the station once a day in order to fulfil the legal obligations of an 'open' station. A poster at the station informed ticket-holders to use a taxi to Newhaven Harbour station at the scheduled time of the parliamentary train, although the journey between the two stations was a short walk. In May 2017, the station buildings were demolished and access to the site remained impossible. Service was suspended in early 2019 due to resignalling works.

== Closure ==
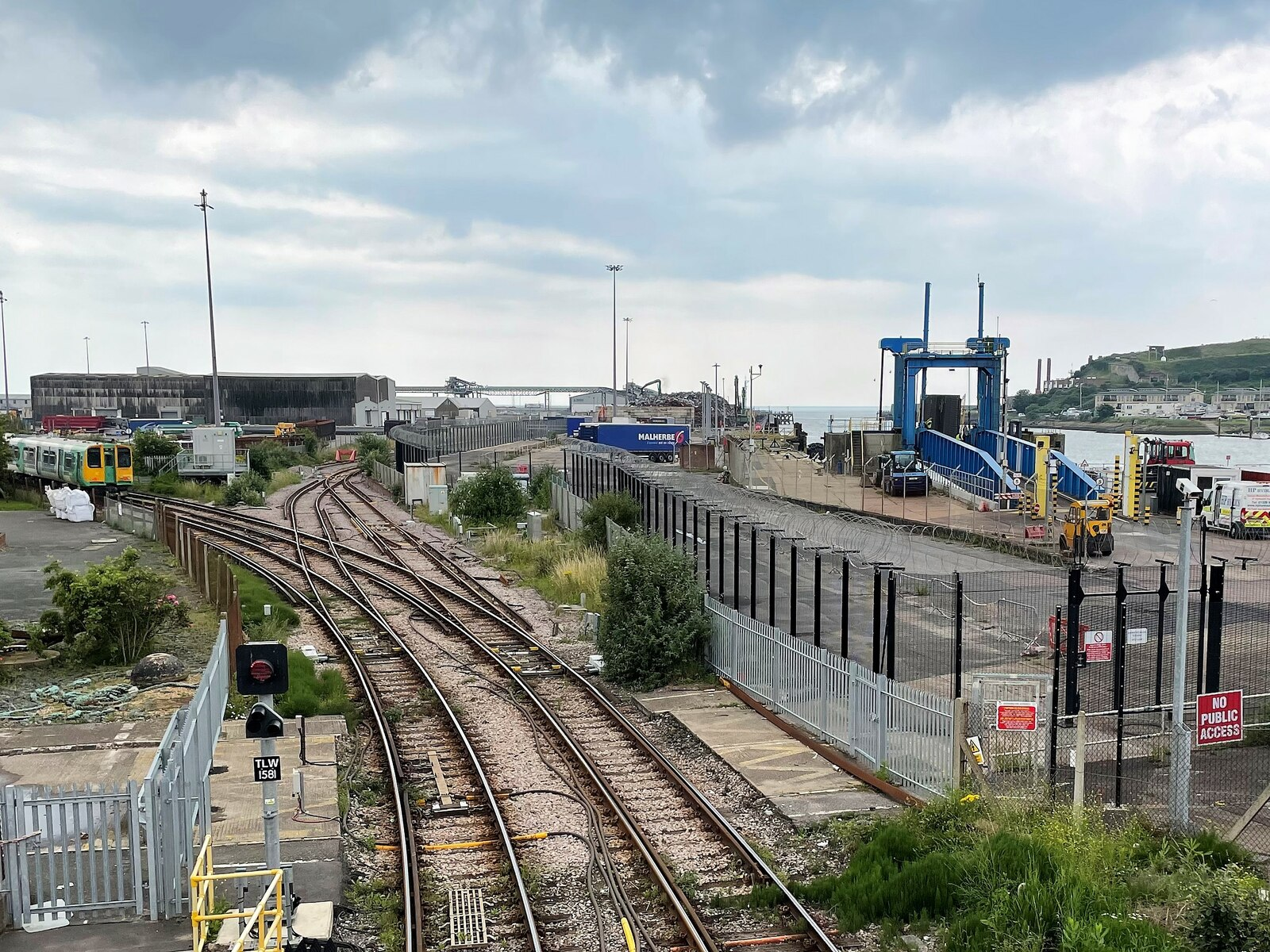
The station site after closure, demolition and redevelopment

In May 2018, it was announced that the station was being considered for a legal closure as part of plans to improve freight connectivity in the area. On 15 January 2020, the Department for Transport (DfT) opened a formal public consultation to close the station, citing this reason. It further stated the work required to rebuild and repair the station to modern standards, including closed-circuit television, information points and toilets, would cost over £600,000 and provide no perceivable benefit for the community. As the station site was only accessible via Newhaven Harbour station and the route between the two passed no residential properties, Network Rail suggested reopening it would provide no travel improvements for anyone. A saving of an estimated £1.9 million was quoted. The closure was advertised on posters and digital signs at Victoria.

The consultation ended on 19 April. It attracted 27 responses with only 4 opposing the decision to close the station. Two of these opposed the closure on the basis that it may negatively affect local rail services; the other two raised concerns over the closure of any railway station on environmental grounds. With very little opposition to closure, the DfT announced their proposal to do so on 24 June. The DfT's decision was submitted to the Office of Rail and Road for ratification, and after approving the DfT's decision, the station was formally closed on 22 October. Former parliamentary under-secretary of state for the DfT and local member of parliament for Lewes, Norman Baker, said the 14-year delay to formally close the station was "a joke", sarcastically suggesting that Network Rail could re-open it as "Newhaven Rubble".

Following closure, the site of Newhaven Marine was redeveloped to connect the reception siding to the existing berthing siding and turnback for passenger trains. Further south, the track extends into Newhaven East Quay, which handled aggregates operated by DB Cargo UK. Freight services began on 18 June 2020.

Preceding station	Historical railways	Following station
Terminus	Southern; Seaford Branch Line	Newhaven Harbour

== See also ==
- Closure by stealth
- Folkestone Harbour railway station
