= SR V class =

Class of 40 three-cylinder 4-4-0 locomotives

SR V "Schools" class
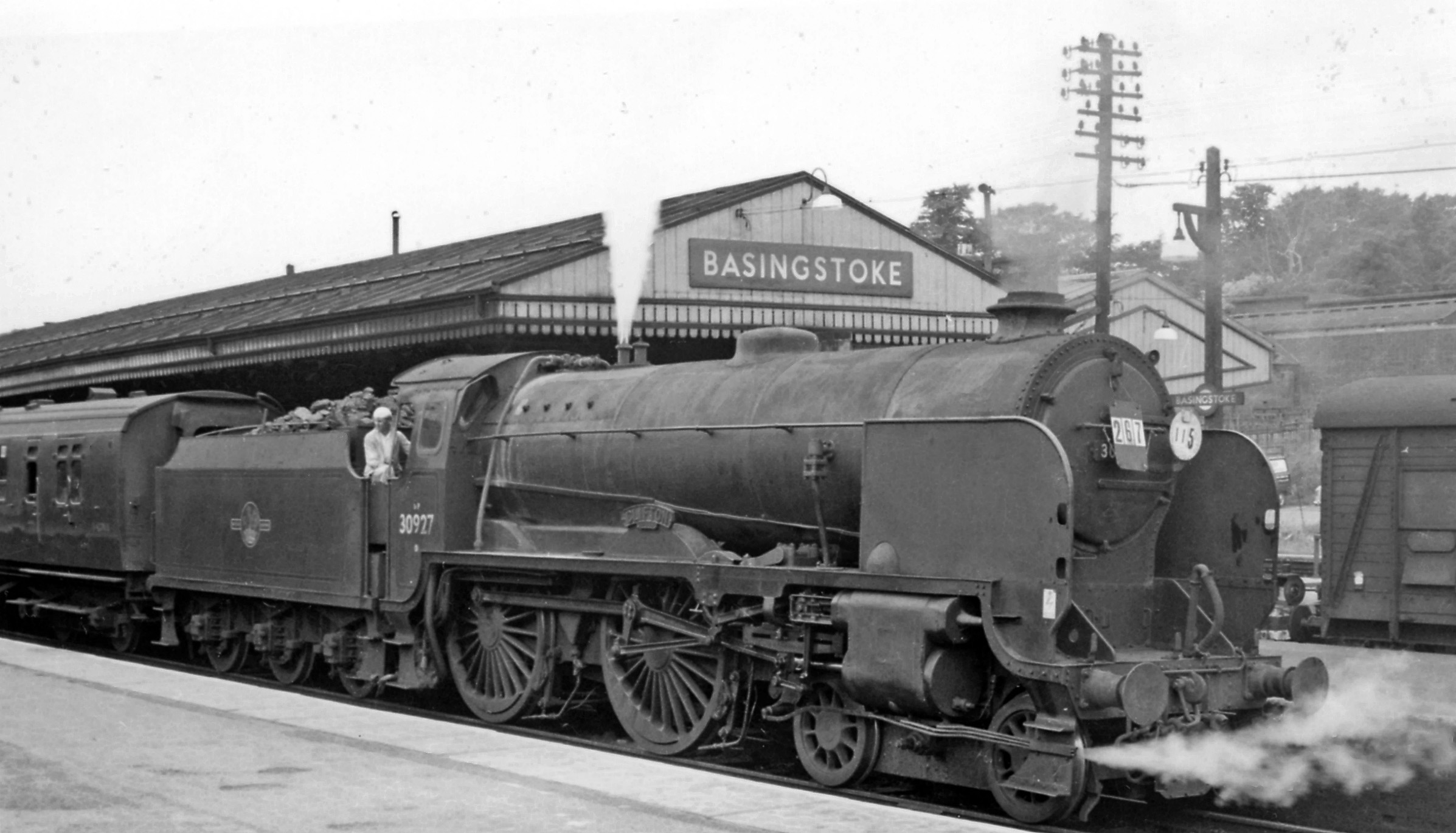
- 30927 Clifton at Basingstoke in July 1961
Type and origin
- Power type: Steam
- Designer: Richard Maunsell
- Builder: SR Eastleigh Works
- Build date: 1930–1935
- Total produced: 40
Specifications
- Configuration
  - Whyte: 4-4-0
  - UIC: 2′B h3
- Gauge: 4 ft 8 1/2 in (1,435 mm) standard gauge
- Leading dia.: 3 ft 1 in (0.940 m)
- Driver dia.: 6 ft 7 in (2.007 m)
- Length: 58 ft 9 3/4 in (17.93 m)
- Width: 8 ft 6 1/2 in (2.60 m)
- Height: 13 ft 0 in (3.96 m)
- Axle load: 21.0 long tons (21.3 t; 23.5 short tons)
- Loco weight: 67.1 long tons (68.2 t; 75.2 short tons)
- Tender weight: 42.4 long tons (43.1 t; 47.5 short tons)
- Total weight: 109.5 long tons (111.3 t; 122.6 short tons)
- Fuel type: Coal
- Fuel capacity: 5 long tons (5.1 t; 5.6 short tons)
- Water cap.: 4,000 imp gal (18,000 L; 4,800 US gal)
- Firebox
  - Grate area: 28.3 sq ft (2.63 m^{2})
- Boiler pressure: 220 psi (1.52 MPa)
- Cylinders: Three
- Cylinder size: 16.5 in × 26 in (419 mm × 660 mm)
Performance figures
- Tractive effort: 25,130 lbf (111.8 kN)
Career
- Operators: Southern Railway; → British Railways
- Class: SR: V
- Power class: BR: 5P
- Numbers: SR: 900–939; BR: 30900–30939
- Locale: Southern Region
- Withdrawn: 1961–1962
- Disposition: Three preserved, remainder scrapped

The SR V class, more commonly known as the Schools class, is a class of steam locomotive designed by Richard Maunsell for the Southern Railway. The class was a cut down version of his Lord Nelson class but also incorporated components from Urie and Maunsell's LSWR/SR King Arthur class. It was the last locomotive in Britain to be designed with a 4-4-0 wheel arrangement, and was the most powerful class of 4-4-0 ever produced in Europe. All 40 of the class were named after English public schools, and were designed to provide a powerful class of intermediate express passenger locomotive on semi-fast services for lines which could cope with high axle loads but some of which had short turntables.

Because they used a King Arthur firebox, rather than the square-topped Belpaire firebox used on the Lord Nelsons, the class could be used on lines with a restricted loading gauge and some of the best performance by the class was on the heavily restricted Tonbridge to Hastings line. The locomotives performed well from the beginning but were subject to various minor modifications to improve their performance over the years. The class operated until 1961 when mass withdrawals took place and all had gone by December 1962. Three examples are now preserved on heritage railways in Britain.

== Background ==
By 1928, the Southern Railway was well served by large 4-6-0 express passenger locomotives, but there was an urgent need for a class to fulfill intermediate roles throughout the system. Although they proved to be reliable and strong locomotives in common with his other 4-4-0 rebuilds, Maunsell’s previous development of the remaining fifteen of his predecessor’s L class was undertaken merely to tide over the Southern Railway until the completion of the King Arthur and Lord Nelson projects.

Thus, an entirely new secondary express passenger locomotive was required to operate over the main lines throughout the system, specifically for the Tonbridge to Hastings line and the Kent Coast expresses, with due regard to limitations imposed by relatively short turntables in some places on the network.

== Design ==
Maunsell’s original plan was to use large-wheeled 2-6-4 tank engines for this purpose, but the Sevenoaks railway accident made him have second thoughts. He therefore chose a relatively short wheelbase 4-4-0 design although by this period 4-6-0 was more usual for this type of work. Authorities disagree as to whether Maunsell had in mind the restricted loading gauge of the Tonbridge to Hastings line when he designed the class, or whether this was an "unexpected bonus" when he was forced to substitute a "King Arthur" round-topped firebox to his planned Belpaire design to reduce the axle load on the driving wheels to acceptable limits. In either event the class was undoubtedly Maunsell's most immediately successful design, and the locomotives did some of their best work on the Hastings route.

== Construction history ==
The basic layout of the class was influenced by the existing ‘’Lord Nelson’’ class 4-6-0 design, but the use of the round topped firebox enabled Maunsell to design the cab's curved profile to fit the gauge restrictions of the Hastings line while allowing adequate forward visibility. The short frame length of the 4-4-0 locomotive also meant very little overhang on the line's tight curves. To maintain the high power rating required for express passenger engines, Maunsell opted for a three-cylinder design. In terms of tractive effort, the class was the most powerful 4-4-0 ever built in Britain, and were the only 4-4-0 type to be given the power classification of 5P by British Railways. They were well liked by crews. They also had a higher tractive effort than the nominally more powerful King Arthur class 4-6-0s, but at the cost of high axle-loading: 21 long tons (21 t). The permanent way on the Hastings line therefore had to be upgraded during 1929 and 1930 to accept the new locomotive.

Permission was granted for the first batch of fifteen locomotives in March 1928, but this was reduced to ten when it became apparent that they would not immediately be able to operate on the Hastings route. Production delays at Eastleigh railway works meant that they were not delivered until between March and July 1930. Once the original batch had proved their worth and had been well received by the crews a further twenty locomotives were ordered in March 1931 for delivery between December 1932 and March 1934. A third batch of twenty were ordered from Eastleigh in March 1932 after the completion of the previous order, but this was subsequently reduced to ten locomotives because of the continuing trade depression. The final locomotive in the class was delivered in July 1935.

=== Naming the locomotives ===
The Southern Railway continued its 1923 naming policy for express passenger locomotives with this class. As several public schools were located on the Southern Railway network, the locomotives were named after them. This was another marketing success for both railway and schools concerned, continuing in the tradition of the N15 King Arthur and Lord Nelson classes.

Where possible, the Southern sent the newly constructed locomotive to a station near the school after which it was named for its official naming ceremony, when pupils were allowed to view the cab of "their" engine. Extension of the class meant that names from "foreign" schools outside the Southern Railway catchment area were used, including Rugby and Malvern.

=== Modifications ===
The class performed well from the outset, but there were a number of minor modifications over the years. The first ten were built without smoke deflectors, but these were added from August 1931, and the remaining thirty were fitted with them from new. Following the successful introduction of the Lemaître multiple jet blastpipes on to the Lord Nelson class, Maunsell's successor Oliver Bulleid began to fit them to the Schools class. However no discernible improvement to draughting was experienced, and only twenty examples were so modified, the most obvious change in their appearance being the large diameter chimney.

== Operational use ==
The original ten locomotives were shared between Dover for use on the South Eastern Main Line and Eastbourne for London expresses. Several of the former later transferred to Ramsgate. By mid 1931 they began to be used on the Hastings services and as more locomotives became available later that year they also appeared on Portsmouth expresses. After the electrification of the London to Eastbourne and the London to Portsmouth routes in the late 1930s the class also began to be used from Bournemouth. Under British Railways they were also widely used on cross-country trains from Brighton to Cardiff and Exeter and on the Newhaven Boat Trains. Two locomotives (30902 and 30921) were briefly supplied with Lord Nelson tenders for use on the longer runs of the Western Section.

=== Achievements ===
The class was frequently regarded by locomotive crews as the finest constructed by the Southern Railway up to 1930, and could turn in highly spectacular performances for its size. The fastest recorded speed for these locomotives was 95 mph (153 km/h), achieved near Wool railway station in 1938 by 928 Stowe pulling a four coach train from Dorchester to Wareham. However, there was a drawback with such high power and relatively low weight; when starting the locomotive from a standstill, wheelslips frequently occurred, calling for skilled handling on the footplate. Unusually, the factor of adhesion is below the usual design target of 4, although the smoother power delivery of the 3-cylinder layout compensates for this to some extent.

The footplate crews regarded them so highly that more of the class were constructed for other parts of the network, although the electrification of the Southern's Eastern Section meant that they were dispersed from their original working grounds.

=== Withdrawal ===
The introduction of British Rail Class 201 diesel-electric multiple units to the Hastings route after 1957 and the completion of the electrification of the South Eastern Main Line in 1961 deprived the class of much of their work. Withdrawals began in January 1961 and the whole class had disappeared from service by December 1962.

== Accidents and incidents ==
- On 11 May 1941, locomotive No. 934 St. Lawrence was severely damaged at Cannon Street station, London in a Luftwaffe air raid.
- On 16 March 1949, locomotive 30932 Blundells was derailed at Paddock Wood, Kent.

== Livery and numbering ==
=== Southern Railway ===
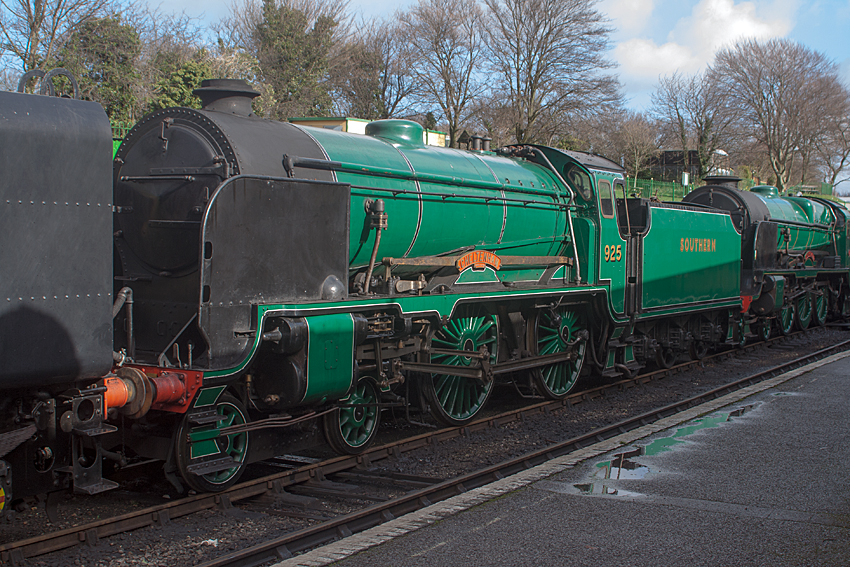
925 Cheltenham at Ropley

When built, the Schools Class were outshopped in Maunsell's darker version of the LSWR passenger sage green livery lined in black and white, with cabside numberplates and "Southern" and the loco number on the tender in yellow. Later adaptations of the Southern Railway livery following Bulleid's arrival as Chief Mechanical Engineer entailed Malachite Green livery, again with "Sunshine Yellow" picking out the numbers and "Southern" on the tender (during the Second World War the locomotives were painted black with yellow lettering and numbers). The smoke deflectors – a later addition – were also treated with this livery. Numbers allocated to the locomotives were 900–939.

=== Post-1948 (nationalisation) ===
Initial livery after nationalisation in 1948 was modified Southern Railway malachite green and sunshine yellow with 'British Railways' on the tender, and the Southern numbering system was temporarily retained with an "S" prefix, e.g. S900. Following this the locomotives were repainted British Railways mixed traffic lined black and given the power classification 5P, as only the larger passenger locos were painted green. This choice of livery proved an unpopular decision considering the locomotives' duties, and they were subsequently outshopped in British Railways brunswick green livery with orange and black lining as they became due for overhaul. By this stage the class had been renumbered under standard British Railways procedure, from 30900 to 30939.

== Preservation ==
Three members of the class have been preserved and all three have run in preservation, with Nos. 30925 and 30926 also running at certain points on the mainline.

Number (Current in Bold)		Name	Built	Withdrawn	Service Life	Location	Owners	Livery	Condition	Mainline Certified	Photograph	Notes
SR	BR	Name	Built	Withdrawn	Service Life	Location	Owners	Livery	Condition	Mainline Certified	Photograph	Notes
925	**30925**	Cheltenham	Apr. 1934	Dec. 1962	28 Years, 8 months	National Railway Museum	National Collection	BR Green	Awaiting overhaul, boiler ticket expired in 2022	No		Appeared at Rocket 150 event in May 1980
**926**	30926	Repton	May 1934	Dec. 1962	28 Years, 8 months	North Yorkshire Moors Railway	North Yorkshire Moors Railway	SR Olive Green	Operational, boiler ticket expires in 2027.	Yes (Grosmont to Whitby and Whitby to Battersby only, 2017 - 2024)		Returned to steam in 2017 after a 5-year overhaul.
928	30928	Stowe	Jun. 1934	Nov. 1962	28 Years, 7 months	Bluebell Railway	Maunsell Locomotive Society	N/A (will be SR Olive green)	Under overhaul as of 2026.	No		Last steamed in 1990.

- 925, Cheltenham, is part of the National Railway Collection. Until June 2024 was at the Mid Hants having undergone overhaul by a team from the Mid Hants Railway (led by Chris Smith) at Eastleigh Works. On completion, the locomotive featured at Railfest in June 2012 and then returned to the Mid Hants (on 26/28 June) where it was based on long-term loan from the NRM. It joined fellow Maunsell Southern Railway engine Lord Nelson Class No. 850 Lord Nelson. In 1980, it took part in the Rocket 150 celebrations and later the parade at Rainhill on the Liverpool and Manchester Railway. The engine travelled to and from the event on the mainline under its own power.

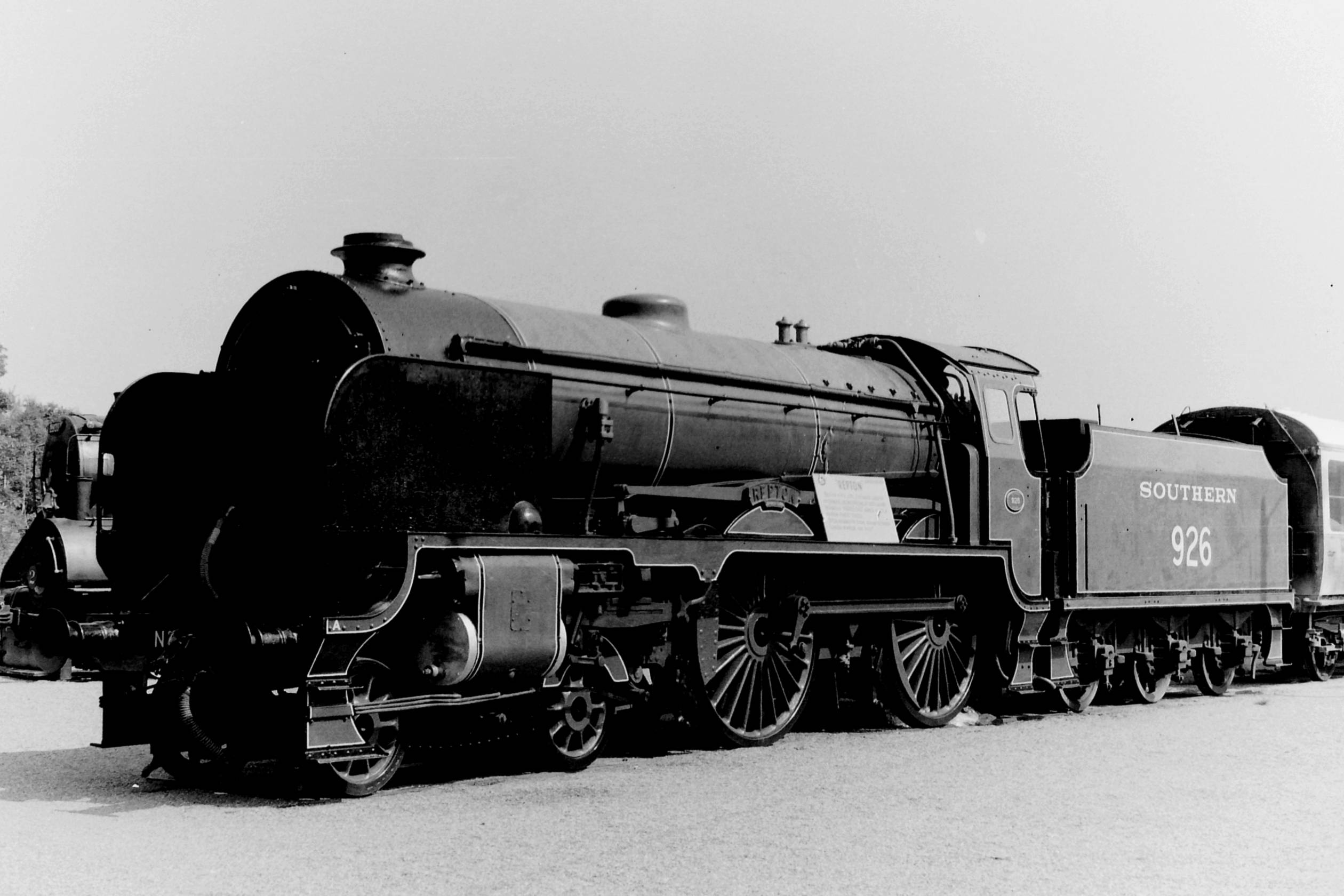
Repton on display at Steamtown USA in Bellows Falls, Vermont, USA in August 1970.

- 926, Repton, is owned by the North Yorkshire Moors Railway. It was completed in May 1934 and entered service on the Bournemouth route, with some time operating between Waterloo and Portsmouth before that line was electrified. It was the last of the class to be overhauled by British Railways in October 1960, so was considered an excellent choice for preservation. In December 1962, the engine was withdrawn from service, and it was purchased for preservation in the United States, later being donated to Steamtown, U.S.A. in Bellows Falls, Vermont by the purchaser. It was cosmetically overhauled at Eastleigh in 1966 before being shipped across the Atlantic. Steamtown loaned the engine to the Cape Breton Steam Railway in Canada, where it operated a regular passenger service. In 1989 it was sold again, and returned to the UK to the NYMR, where it was again overhauled and found to be in good condition. Recently returned to service following an overhaul. 30926 has also operated on the mainline between Whitby and Grosmont with occasional visits to Battersby.
- 928 Stowe, was built in 1934 at a cost of £5,000 by the Eastleigh locomotive works of the Southern Railway. It recorded more than a million miles of passenger service operation during 28 years of Southern main line use. It was purchased from British Railways for Lord Montagu's National Motor Museum on withdrawal in 1962; its road delivery to Beaulieu was covered for a Look at Life documentary episode, Turn of the Wheel. After standing in the open for some years, it was moved to the East Somerset Railway in 1973, and then to the Bluebell Railway where it was put into running order by the Maunsell Locomotive Society, entering service in 1981. It ran for the length of its ten-year boiler ticket and was withdrawn from service in 1990. 'Stowe' was purchased by the MLS from Lord Montagu in September 2000, thus securing its future at the Bluebell. The purchase was funded in part by the sale of S15 class no. 830, which subsequently moved to the North Yorkshire Moors Railway where it awaits restoration to working order. In 2003 the tender was completely rebuilt, with a brand new tank being built. As of 2026, 'Stowe' is undergoing a full overhaul to return it to working order.

== Models ==
The erstwhile Kitmaster company produced an unpowered polystyrene injection moulded model kit for OO gauge, which went on sale in March 1959. In late 1962, the Kitmaster brand was sold by its parent company (Rosebud Dolls) to Airfix, who transferred the moulding tools to their own factory; they re-introduced some of the former Kitmaster range, including the Schools class locomotive in May 1968. In time, the moulding tools passed on to Dapol who have also produced the model kit. Crownline Models produce an etched chassis kit to permit this model to be motorised.

Hornby Railways produce a super-detail and a cheaper railroad version based on their old tender drive OO gauge model of the Schools Class. A Hornby model of 30932 Blundell's, in BR lined black, received a positive review from British Railway Modelling in 2009. Hornby also produced an O Gauge model of Eton in 1937, with both clockwork and electric versions being available.

Gladiator Models (Britain) Makes an O gauge (7 mm) photo etched brass kit with cast brass and white metal details.

Mettoy produced an O Gauge clockwork model of the Eton 900.

Dapol produce a British N gauge model Schools with several name versions.
