= Call-sign allocation plan =

Table of allocation of international call sign series

In telecommunications, call-sign allocation plan is the table of allocation of international call sign series contained in the current edition of the International Telecommunication Union (ITU) Radio Regulations.

Note: In the table of allocation, the first two characters of each call sign (whether two letters or one number and one letter, in that order) identify the nationality of the station. In certain instances where the complete alphabetical block is allocated to a single nation, the first letter is sufficient for national identity. Individual assignments are made by appropriate national assignment authorities from the national allocation.

== See also ==
- Airline codes
- Brevity code
- ITU prefix
- North American call sign
- Tactical designator
