= Non-ITU prefix =

Unassigned callsign prefixes

Prefixes that are used for radio and television are usually allocated by ITU. They also form the basis for, but do not exactly match, aircraft registration identifiers. But in some cases, especially among amateur radio operators other, by ITU unallocated, callsigns are used when operating from disputed areas or countries that are internationally not (yet) recognized. They can be:

- unofficial - used by individuals without any issued permit
- temporary - issued by local authority
- official - recognized internationally by different organisations

Prefixes for those stations are either unallocated or unavailable by ITU definitions.

== ITU unallocated and unavailable call sign prefixes ==
Unallocated: The following call sign prefixes are available for future allocation by the ITU. (x represents any letter; n represents any digit from 2–9.)

- E8, E9, H5, J9, On, S4, T9*, Un, V9, Xn, YZ*, Z4–Z7, Z9, 4N*.

(* Indicates a prefix that has recently been returned to the ITU.)

Unavailable: Under present ITU guidelines the following call sign prefixes shall not be allocated. (x represents any letter; n represents any digit from 2–9.)

- nn, x0, x1, 0x, 1x, Qx (x0 and x1 prefixes remain permitted for callsigns beginning with one of the letters B, F, G, I, K, M, N, R, or W.)
- no prefixes beginning with Q are used—they may be confused with Q codes.
- no prefixes with the digits 1 or 0 are used—they may be confused with the letters I or O.
- two digit prefixes (nn) are not as yet considered by the ITU.

== Table of Non-ITU radio prefixes ==
Call Sign Series	State / territory	Status	Organisation(s)
0
0Q	Bavaria	Official status unknown / unofficial	N/A
0S	Principality of Seborga	Official status unknown / unofficial	N/A
1
1A	Sovereign Military Order of Malta	Official, DXCC entity	SMOM Sovereign Military Order of Malta
1B	Northern Cyprus	Official status unknown / unofficial	N/A
1B	Blenheim Reef	Unofficial	N/A
1C	Chechnya	Unofficial - now RA6	N/A
1G	Geyser Reef	Unofficial	N/A
1L	Liberland	Temporary	Liberland Amateur Radio Association
1M	Minerva Reefs	Unofficial	N/A
1S	Spratly Islands	Unofficial - now 9M0, DX0 or BV9, DXCC entity	N/A
1SL, 1S	Principality of Sealand	Official status unknown / unofficial	N/A
1X	Chechnya	Unofficial - now RA6	N/A
1Z	Kayin State	Official status unknown / unofficial	N/A
A
A1	Jabal al-Tair Island	Unofficial, no longer used - now J2A	N/A
D
D0–D1	Donetsk People's Republic	Official status unknown / unofficial	Unknown
H
H5	Bophuthatswana	Unofficial, no longer used - now ZS	N/A
M
M1	San Marino	Temporary, no longer used - now T7	N/A
O
O1	South Ossetia	Unofficial	N/A
S
S0	Western Sahara	Official, DXCC entity	Western Sahara's Amateur Radio Society (SØ1WS)
S4	Ciskei (South Africa)	Unofficial, no longer used - now ZS	N/A
S8	Transkei	Unofficial, no longer used - now ZS	N/A
T
T0	Principality of Seborga	Official status unknown / unofficial	N/A
T1	Transnistria	Unofficial	N/A
T4	Venda (South Africa)	Unofficial, no longer used - now ZS; Prefix is assigned to Cuba	N/A
T8	Principality of Seborga	Official status unknown / unofficial Prefix is assigned to Palau	N/A
V
V9	Vendaland (South Africa)	Unofficial, no longer used - now ZS	N/A
X
X5	Bosnia and Herzegovina	Temporary, no longer used - now E7	N/A
Z
Z6	Kosovo	Official in Kosovo, unapproved by ITU; DXCC entity	SHRAK Shoqata e Radioamatorëve të Kosovës

== See also ==
- ITU prefix
- Amateur radio call signs
- Aircraft registration
