= Spokane, Portland and Seattle class L-1 =

L-1
Type and origin
- Power type: Steam
- Builder: Schenectady Locomotive Works
- Build date: March 1889
Specifications
- Configuration
  - Whyte: 4-4-0
- Gauge: 4 ft 8 1/2 in (1,435 mm)
- Driver dia.: 62 in (1,575 mm)
- Adhesive weight: 64,000 lb (29.0 t)
- Loco weight: 96,380 lb (43.7 t)
- Fuel type: Oil
- Boiler pressure: 140 lbf/in^{2} (0.97 MPa)
- Cylinders: Two
- Cylinder size: 18 in × 26 in (457 mm × 660 mm)
Performance figures
- Tractive effort: 16,168 lbf (71.92 kN)
Career
- Operators: Spokane, Portland and Seattle Railway
- Class: L-1
- Numbers: 50
- Locale: United States
- Retired: August 30, 1928

Spokane, Portland and Seattle Railway Class L-1 was a class of 4-4-0 steam locomotives built in 1889 by Schenectady Locomotive Works.
