= SECR L class =

Class of steam locomotives

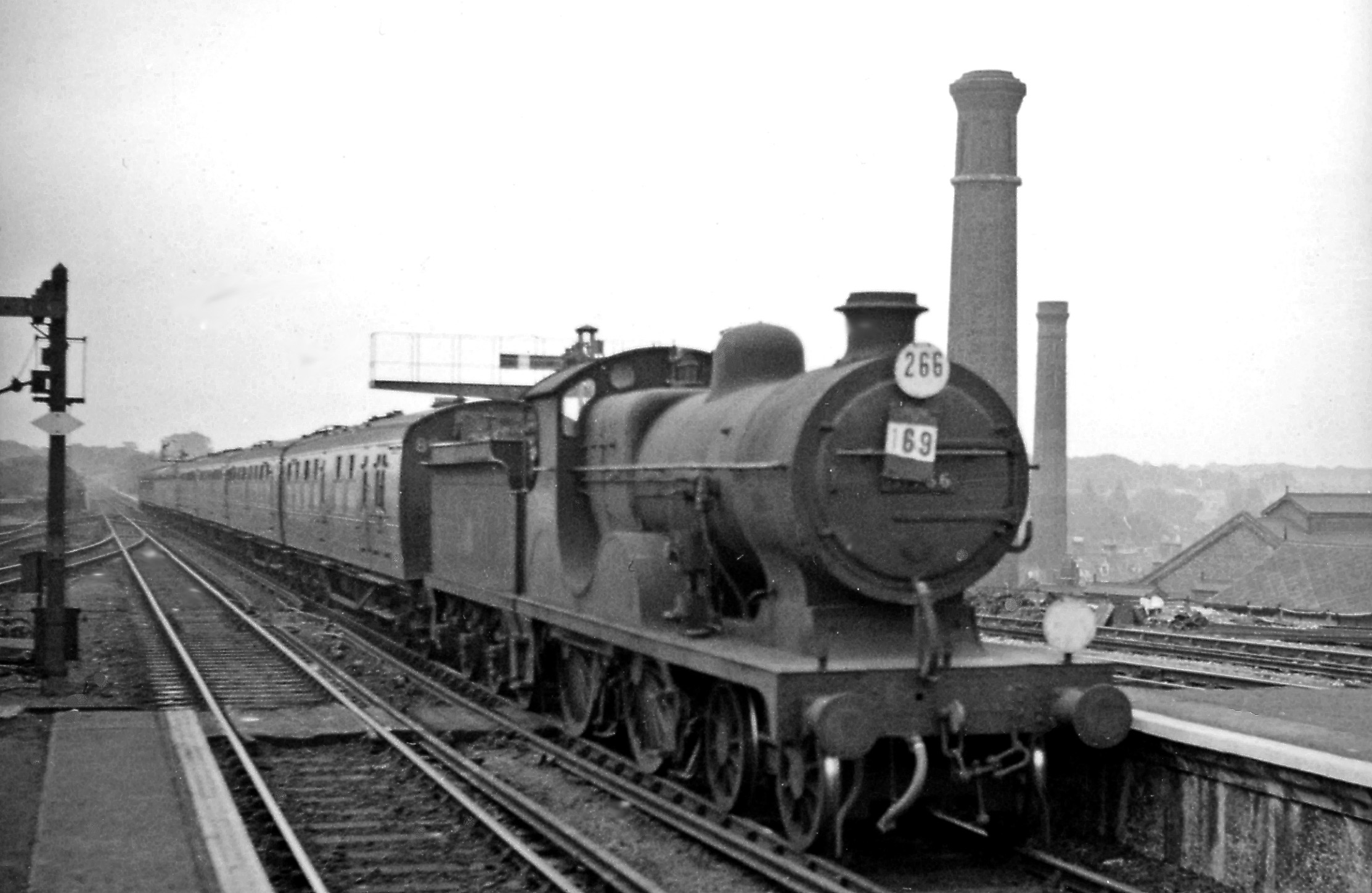
- 31766 arriving at Ramsgate in 1958
Type and origin
- Power type: Steam
- Designer: Wainwright (with later alterations by Maunsell)
- Builder: Beyer Peacock (12); Borsig, Berlin (10)
- Build date: 1914
- Total produced: 22
Specifications
- Configuration
  - Whyte: 4-4-0
  - UIC: 2′B h2
- Gauge: 4 ft 8 1/2 in (1,435 mm)
- Leading dia.: 3 ft 7 in (1,090 mm)
- Driver dia.: 6 ft 8 in (2,030 mm)
- Length: 56 ft 7 5/8 in (17.3 m) over buffers
- Axle load: 19 long tons 5 cwt (43,100 lb or 19.6 t)
- Adhesive weight: 37 long tons 14 cwt (84,400 lb or 38.3 t)
- Loco weight: 57 long tons 9 cwt (128,700 lb or 58.4 t) (later 57 long tons 16 cwt (129,500 lb or 58.7 t))
- Tender weight: 40 long tons 6 cwt (90,300 lb or 40.9 t)
- Total weight: 97 long tons 15 cwt (219,000 lb or 99.3 t) (later 98 long tons 2 cwt (219,700 lb or 99.7 t))
- Fuel type: Coal
- Fuel capacity: 5 long tons 0 cwt (11,200 lb or 5.1 t)
- Water cap.: 3,500 imp gal (16,000 L; 4,200 US gal)
- Firebox
  - Grate area: 22 1/2 sq ft (2.09 m^{2})
- Boiler pressure: New: 160 lbf/in^{2} (1.10 MPa); later: 180 lbf/in^{2} (1.24 MPa)
- Cylinders: Two, inside
- Cylinder size: New: 20 1/2 in × 26 in (520 mm × 660 mm); later 19 1/2 in × 26 in (500 mm × 660 mm)
- Valve gear: Stephenson
- Valve type: 9-inch (229 mm) piston valves
Performance figures
- Tractive effort: 18,575 lbf (82.63 kN) (later 18,908 lbf (84.11 kN))
- Factor of adh.: 4.55 (later 4.47)
Career
- Operators: South Eastern and Chatham Railway; → Southern Railway; → Southern Region of British Railways
- Class: SECR/SR: L
- Power class: BR: 2P, later 3P
- Numbers: SECR: 760–781; → SR: A760–A781; → 1760–1781; → BR: 31760–31781
- Withdrawn: 1956–1961
- Disposition: All scrapped

The SECR L class was a class of 4-4-0 steam tender locomotive built for express passenger service on the South Eastern and Chatham Railway. Although designed by Harry Wainwright, they were built during the Maunsell era.

== Background ==
The South Eastern and Chatham Railway (SECR) was an amalgamation of two competing companies, the South Eastern Railway (SER) and the London, Chatham and Dover Railway (LCDR) which took place in 1899. One of the first tasks of Harry Wainwright, the new Chief Mechanical Engineer, was to introduce a series of standard locomotives which would operate on both railways; but the LCDR main line was more lightly engineered and subject to more severe weight restrictions than that of the SER. At the same time the Board of Directors was anxious to reap some of the financial benefits of amalgamation by closing the LCDR Longhedge Railway Works.

During the first years of the SECR, express passenger services were well served by Wainwright's 'D' and 'E' 4-4-0 classes; however loads continued to increase and by 1912 the designer realised that he would soon need more powerful locomotives. However the weight restrictions on the LCDR main line prevented the use of any significantly larger or more powerful locomotives, and strengthening the bridges there would have been prohibitively expensive. The Board of Directors therefore ordered Wainwright to design a locomotive class specifically for the SER main line services.

Wainwright's original design was criticised by the Directors for the use of saturated steam and slide valves, both of which were considered outdated in the 20th century. These criticisms coincided with an acute motive power crisis on the railway during the summer of 1913, due in part to the Directors' insistence on prematurely closing Longhedge Works and Ashford railway works being unable to handle the increased workload. As a result Wainwright was asked to retire on 30 November 1913, before these new 'L class' locomotives could be ordered.

== Design and construction ==
Wainwright's original design for the new class was for a handsome and robust locomotive which incorporated a Belpaire firebox. Later revisions incorporated piston valves and a Schmidt superheater. After Wainwright's departure his assistant, Robert Surtees, made further detailed changes – slightly enlarging the boiler, firebox and wheels – and substituting a Robinson design superheater, before placing an order for twelve examples with Beyer Peacock for delivery by the end of June 1914. After Richard Maunsell took office in January 1914, he agreed to the ordering of a further ten with minor detail differences and Schmidt superheaters from Borsig of Berlin. The Borsig locomotives were delivered just in time before the outbreak of World War I. They were supplied in kit form and assembled at Ashford railway works by Borsig employees. The Beyer Peacock series were delayed and were delivered later, between August and November 1914.

=== L1 class ===
Following the grouping of the SECR with other railways to form the Southern Railway (UK) in 1923 Maunsell developed the design in 1926 with his L1 class. The design was enlarged and the weight increased to 57 tons 16 cwt. The boiler pressure was increased from 160 to 180 lbs per square inch but the cylinders reduced in diameter from 20.5 to 19.5 inches. The engines also had long-travel piston valves, Maunsell’s own design of superheater and side-window cab and other detail alterations. As a result of the success of these changes Maunsell later gradually increased the boiler pressure of the ‘L class’ and fitted them with smaller cylinders and his own superheater over the next two decades as they passed through the workshops for other reasons.

=== Numbering ===
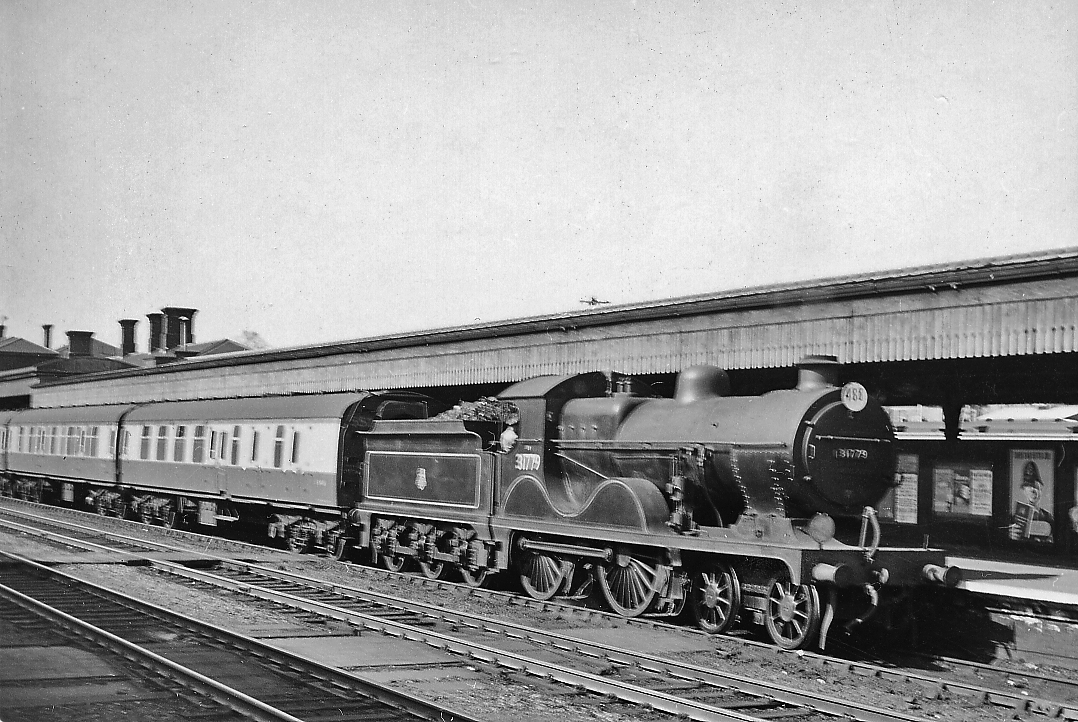
L class at Ashford 20 April 1957

The Beyer Peacock locomotives were numbered were 760-771, and those from Borsig 772-781. All passed to the Southern Railway (SR) in 1923, and initially an "A" prefix was added to the SECR numbers; later the engines were renumbered 1760-1781. All passed to British Railways (BR) in 1948 and BR numbered them 31760-31781. The BR power classification, introduced in January 1949, was initially 2P, but this was revised to 3P in October 1953.

== Operational details ==
The locomotives were used on express trains on the South Eastern main lines from London to Dover, Ramsgate, and Hastings. They remained on these duties until the mid-1920s when they were gradually replaced on the heavier trains by the newer SR L1 class, and in the 1930s by the "King Arthur" and "Schools" classes. By this time improvements had been made to the LCDR main line to Dover and Ramsgate and so they continued to be used on these services until after the Second World War and the Nationalisation of British Railways in 1948. However, the transfer of Bulleid "Light Pacifics" to these services in the early 1950s made the class largely redundant. Some were transferred to Eastleigh and Brighton to replace worn out locomotives on cross-country services, but withdrawal began in 1956. The final locomotive was withdrawn in December 1961. None have been preserved.

== Locomotive summary ==
L class locomotive fleet summary
SECR no.	SR no.	BR no.	Builder	Date delivered	Date withdrawn
760	1760	31760	Beyer Peacock	August 1914	June 1961
761	1761	31761	Beyer Peacock	August 1914	December 1956
762	1762	31762	Beyer Peacock	August 1914	February 1960
763	1763	31763	Beyer Peacock	August 1914	April 1960
764	1764	31764	Beyer Peacock	August 1914	February 1961
765	1765	31765	Beyer Peacock	August 1914	February 1961
766	1766	31766	Beyer Peacock	September 1914	February 1961
767	1767	31767	Beyer Peacock	September 1914	October 1958
768	1768	31768	Beyer Peacock	September 1914	December 1961
769	1769	31769	Beyer Peacock	September 1914	April 1956
770	1770	31770	Beyer Peacock	September 1914	November 1959
771	1771	31771	Beyer Peacock	October 1914	December 1961
772	1772	31772	Borsig	June 1914	February 1959
773	1773	31773	Borsig	June 1914	August 1959
774	1774	31774	Borsig	June 1914	December 1958
775	1775	31775	Borsig	June 1914	August 1959
776	1776	31776	Borsig	June 1914	February 1961
777	1777	31777	Borsig	June 1914	November 1959
778	1778	31778	Borsig	July 1914	August 1959
779	1779	31779	Borsig	July 1914	July 1961
780	1780	31780	Borsig	July 1914	June 1959

== Sources ==
- Dendy Marshall, C.F. (1988). History of the Southern Railway. Ian Allan. pp. 373–374. ISBN 0-7110-0059-X.
