= Level 1 =

Level 1 may refer to:

== Technology and standards ==
- Level 1 (National Qualifications Framework)
- level 1 cache, a type of CPU cache (Computer Memory)
- A Level I trauma center
- Level 1, a level of automation in a self-driving car (see Autonomous car#Classification)
- Level I Environmental Site Assessment
- Biosafety level 1, a laboratory grade
- Level 1 market data

== Companies ==
- Level 1 Entertainment, an American film production company

== Other uses ==
- Level 1 coronavirus restrictions, see COVID-19 pandemic in Scotland#Levels System
- STANAG 4569 protection level
- Vash: Level 1, a 2023 Indian horror film
