= Marawing 1-L Malamut =

Czech ultralight aircraft

1-L Malamut

General information
- Type: Ultralight aircraft
- National origin: Czech Republic
- Manufacturer: Marawing
- Status: In production (2012)

History
- Developed from: Piper J-3 Cub

The Marawing 1-L Malamut is a Czech ultralight aircraft, designed and produced by Marawing of Kolín. The aircraft is supplied as a complete ready-to-fly-aircraft.

== Design and development ==
The Malamut was developed from the classic Piper J-3 Cub. It was designed to comply with the Fédération Aéronautique Internationale microlight rules. It features a strut-braced high-wing, a two-seats-in-tandem enclosed cockpit, fixed conventional landing gear and a single engine in tractor configuration.

The aircraft is constructed in the same manner as the Cub. The fuselage is made from welded steel tubing, while the wings have a wooden structure, all covered in doped aircraft fabric. Its 10.1 m (33.1 ft) span wing has an area of 15.1 m^{2} (163 sq ft) and flaps. The standard engine available is the 80 hp (60 kW) Rotax 912UL four-stroke powerplant.

== Specifications (1-L Malamut) ==
Data from Bayerl & Tacke

General characteristics

- Crew: one
- Capacity: one passenger
- Wingspan: 10.1 m (33 ft 2 in)
- Wing area: 15.1 m^{2} (163 sq ft)
- Empty weight: 295 kg (650 lb)
- Gross weight: 472.5 kg (1,042 lb)
- Fuel capacity: 160 litres (35 imp gal; 42 US gal)
- Powerplant: 1 × Rotax 912UL four cylinder, liquid and air-cooled, four stroke aircraft engine, 60 kW (80 hp)

Performance

- Maximum speed: 198 km/h (123 mph, 107 kn)
- Cruise speed: 165 km/h (103 mph, 89 kn)
- Stall speed: 50 km/h (31 mph, 27 kn)
- Rate of climb: 5 m/s (980 ft/min)
- Wing loading: 31.3 kg/m^{2} (6.4 lb/sq ft)
