= SR L1 class =

Steam locomotive class

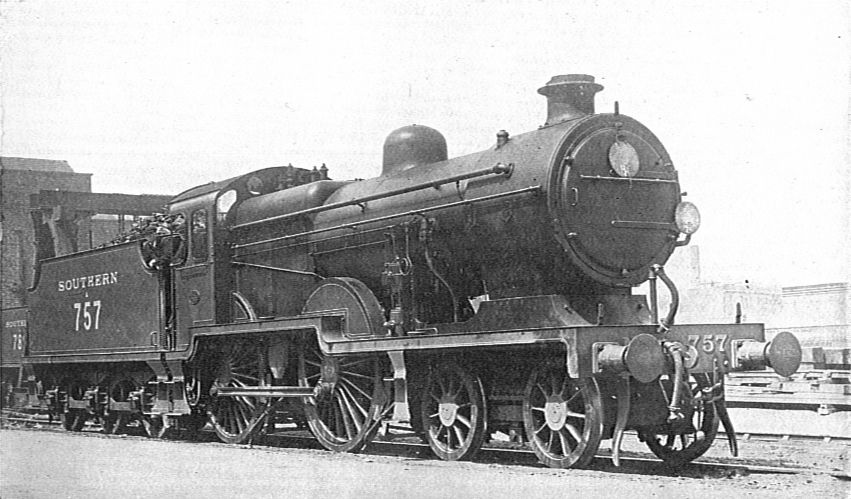
- 757, circa 1928
Type and origin
- Power type: Steam
- Designer: Richard Maunsell (development of SECR L class by Harry Wainwright)
- Builder: North British Locomotive Company
- Serial number: 23356–23370
- Build date: 1926
- Total produced: 15
Specifications
- Configuration
  - Whyte: 4-4-0
  - UIC: 2′B h2
- Gauge: 4 ft 8 1/2 in (1,435 mm) standard gauge
- Leading dia.: 3 ft 7 in (1.092 m)
- Driver dia.: 6 ft 8 in (2.032 m)
- Length: 56 ft 7 5/8 in (17.26 m)
- Loco weight: 57 long tons 16 cwt (129,500 lb or 58.7 t) (64.7 short tons)
- Fuel type: Coal
- Fuel capacity: 5 t (4.9 long tons; 5.5 short tons)
- Water cap.: 3,500 imp gal (15,911.3 L; 4,203.3 US gal)
- Firebox
  - Grate area: 22 1/2 sq ft (2.09 m^{2})
- Boiler pressure: 180 lbf/in^{2} (1.24 MPa)
- Heating surface
  - Firebox: 154 1/2 sq ft (14.35 m^{2})
  - Tubes: 914 sq ft (84.9 m^{2})
  - Flues: 338 1/2 sq ft (31.45 m^{2})
  - Total surface: 1,407 sq ft (130.7 m^{2})
- Superheater
  - Type: Maunsell
  - Heating area: 235 sq ft (21.8 m^{2})
- Cylinders: Two, inside
- Cylinder size: 19 1/2 in × 26 in (495 mm × 660 mm)
- Valve gear: Stephenson
- Valve type: piston valves
- Train brakes: Vacuum
Performance figures
- Tractive effort: 18,910 lbf (84,100 N)
Career
- Operators: Southern Railway; → British Railways
- Class: SR: L1
- Power class: BR: 2P, later 3P
- Numbers: SR: A753–A759, A782–A879; → 1753–1759, 1782–1789; BR: 31753–31759, 31782–31789
- Locale: Southern Region
- Withdrawn: 1959–1962
- Disposition: All scrapped

The Southern Railway L1 class was a class of 4-4-0 steam tender locomotives built for express passenger service on the South Eastern Main Line of the UK Southern Railway. They were designed by Richard Maunsell as a development of Harry Wainwright's L class.

== Background ==
Harry Wainwright had built two useful and attractive 4-4-0 classes for the South Eastern and Chatham Railway between 1902 and 1908; the D class and the E class, and had completed designs for a larger L class at the time of his retirement at the end of 1913. However, by 1918 they were beginning to struggle with the heaviest express trains. Wainwright's successor, Richard Maunsell, therefore rebuilt several examples of the D and E classes immediately before the grouping of the SECR with other railways to form the Southern Railway in 1923.

When Maunsell was appointed as Chief Mechanical Engineer of the new railway he turned his attention to designing new K & K1 class 2-6-4 tank engines. However, in 1926 there was an urgent requirement for fifteen more powerful 4-4-0 locomotives for the London-to-Folkestone express trains. Maunsell did not rebuild the L class, as the locomotives were still relatively new and useful in their current form, but amended Wainwright's drawings to form his own L1 class, and supplied them to the North British Locomotive Company. The weight of the new class was increased to 57 tons 16 cwt. The boiler pressure was increased from 160 to 180 psi (1,100 to 1,200 kPa), but the cylinders were reduced in diameter from 20 1/2 to 19 1/2 inches (521 to 495 mm). The engines also had long-travel piston valves, Maunsell's own design of superheater and side-window cab, and other detail alterations.

=== Numbering ===
The locomotives were originally numbered A753–A759, and A782–A789, but were later renumbered by the Southern Railway as 1753–1759 and 1782–1789. All passed to British Railways in 1948 and renumbered 31753 to 31789. The BR power classification, introduced in January 1949, was initially 2P, but this was revised to 3P in October 1953.

== Operational details ==
The locomotives were used on express trains on the South Eastern main lines from London to Dover, Ramsgate and Hastings. They remained on these duties until the mid-1930s when they were gradually replaced on the heavier trains by the older "King Arthur" and newer "Schools" classes. They continued to be used on the former London Chatham and Dover Railway main line to Dover and Ramsgate until after the Second World War and the nationalisation of British Railways in 1948. The transfer of Bulleid "Light Pacifics" to these services in the early 1950s made the class largely redundant. Some were briefly transferred to Eastleigh and to replace worn out locomotives on cross-country services, but most spent their careers between London and the Kent coast. Withdrawals began in 1959, and the final example (31786) was withdrawn in February 1962. None were preserved.

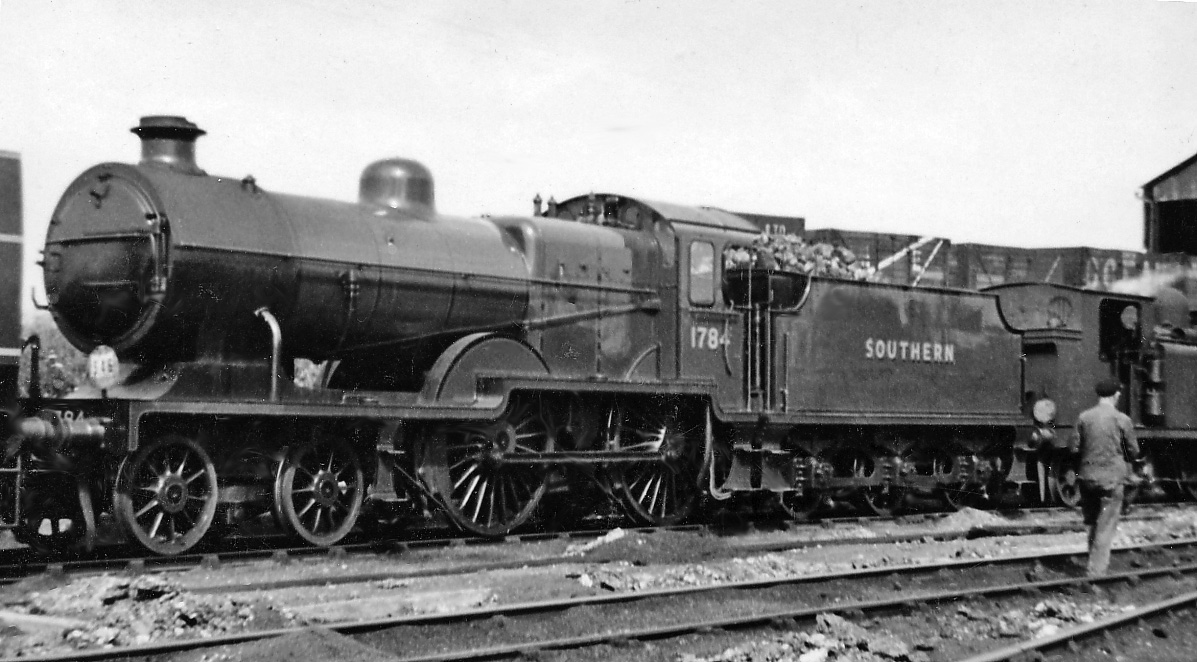
L1 class 4-4-0 No. 1784 at Ashford Locomotive Depot July 1946

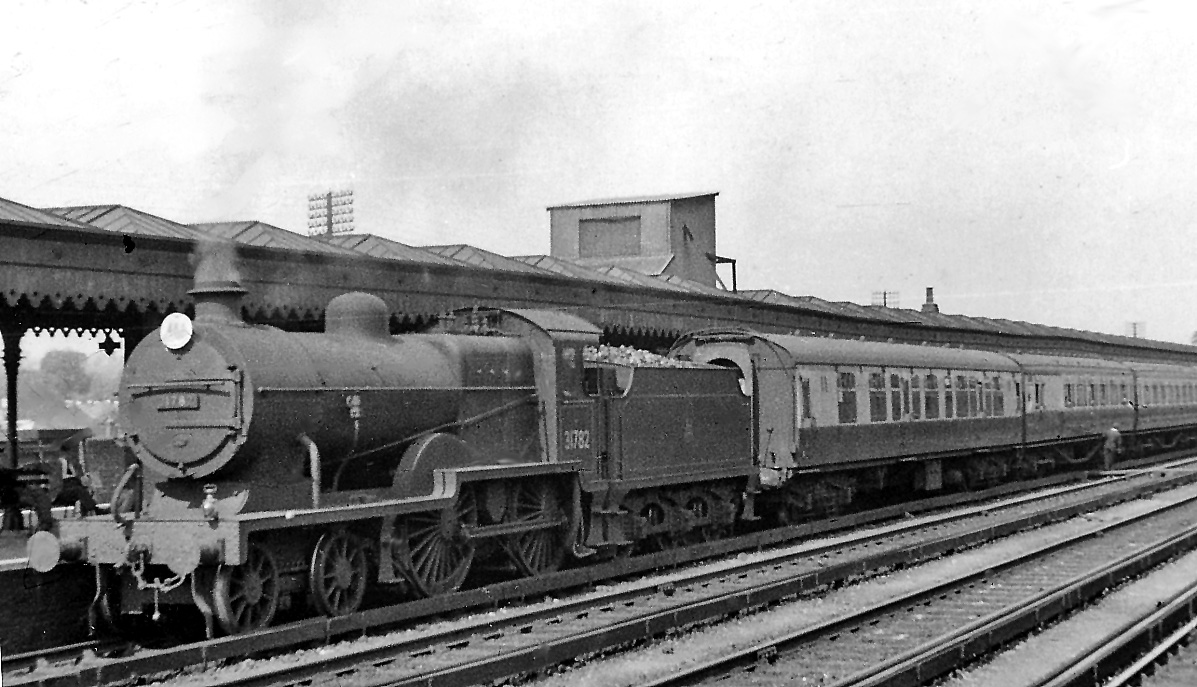
31782 at Redhill 1955
