= ITU prefix =

Radio and television call sign prefix

The International Telecommunication Union (ITU) allocates call sign prefixes for radio and television stations of all types. They also form the basis for, but may not exactly match, aircraft registration identifiers. These prefixes are agreed upon internationally, and are a form of country code. A call sign can be any number of letters and numerals but each country must only use call signs that begin with the characters allocated for use in that country.

With regard to the second and/or third letters in the prefixes in the list below, if the country in question is allocated all callsigns with A to Z in that position, then that country can also use call signs with the digits 0 to 9 in that position. For example, the United States is assigned KA–KZ, and therefore can also use prefixes like K1 or K9.

While ITU prefix rules are adhered to in the context of international broadcasting, including amateur radio, it is rarer for countries to assign broadcast call signs to conventional AM, FM, and television stations with purely domestic reach; the United States, Canada, Mexico, Japan, South Korea, the Philippines, and Argentina are among those that do. Canada presents one notable exception to the ITU prefix rules: Since 1936, it has used CB for its own Canadian Broadcasting Corporation stations, whereas Chile is officially assigned the CB prefix. Innovation, Science and Economic Development Canada's broadcasting rules indicate this is through a "special arrangement", without elaborating. In any case, the two countries are geographically separate enough to prevent confusion; Canada's shortwave broadcasters and amateur radio stations have always used one of its assigned ITU prefixes.

== Unallocated and unavailable call sign prefixes ==
Unallocated: The following call sign prefixes are available for future allocation by the ITU. (x represents any letter; n represents any digit from 2–9.)

- E8, E9, H5, J9, On, S4, T9*, Un, V9, Xn, YZ*, Z4–Z7, Z9, 4N*.

(* Indicates a prefix that has recently been returned to the ITU.) (Note: T9 is the former prefix of Bosnia and Herzegovina; it moved to E7 on 7 August 2007. YZ and 4N belonged to Yugoslavia, along with 4O (which went to successor state Montenegro) and YT and YU (which went to successor state Serbia).^{The ARRL Letter (17 May 2007). "ITU Okays Montenegro, Serbia Call Sign Prefix Agreement". eHam.net.})

Unavailable: Under present ITU guidelines the following call sign prefixes shall not be allocated. They are sometimes used unofficially – such as amateur radio operators operating in a disputed territory or in a nation state that has no official prefix (e.g. S0 in Western Sahara or station 1A0 at Knights of Malta headquarters in Rome). (x represents any letter; n represents any digit from 2–9.)

- nn, x0, x1, 0x, 1x, Qx.
- no prefixes beginning with Q are used—they may be confused with Q codes. Note that this applies to prefixes only - suffixes are the responsibility of the allocating country.
- no prefixes with the digits 1 or 0 are used—they may be confused with the letters I or O.
- two digit prefixes (nn) are not as yet considered by the ITU.

== Allocation table ==
View as grid chart
First character A									First character C								
AA-AI: US									CA-CE: CL					CF-CI: CA			
AJ-AL: US			AM-AO: ES			AP-AR: PK			CJ-CK: CA		CL-CM: CU		CN: MA	CO: CU	CP: BO	CQ-CR: PT	
AS: PK	AT-AW: IN				AX: AU	AY-AZ: AR		A0: N/A	CS-CU: PT			CV-CX: UY			CY-CZ: CA		C0: N/A
A1: N/A	A2: BW	A3: TO	A4: OM	A5: BT	A6: AE	A7: QA	A8: LR	A9: BH	C1: N/A	C2: NR	C3: AD	C4: CY	C5: GM	C6: BS	C7: XM	C8-C9: MZ	
First character D									First character E								
DA-DI: DE									EA-EH: ES								EI: IE
DJ-DR: DE									EJ: IE	EK: AM	EL: LR	EM-EO: UA			EP-EQ: IR		ER: MD
DS-DT: KR		DU-DZ: PH						D0: N/A	ES: EE	ET: ET	EU-EW: BY			EX: KG	EY: TJ	EZ: TM	E0: N/A
D1: N/A	D2-D3: AO		D4: CV	D5: LR	D6: KM	D7-D9: KR			E1: N/A	E2: TH	E3: ER	E4: PS	E5: CK	E6: NU	E7: BA	E8-E9: N/A	
First character H									First character J								
HA: HU	HB: CH(LI)	HC-HD: EC		HE: CH	HF: PL	HG: HU	HH: HT	HI: DO	JA-JI: JP								
HJ-HK: CO		HL: KR	HM: KP	HN: IQ	HO-HP: PA		HQ-HR: HN		JJ-JR: JP								
HS: TH	HT: NI	HU: SV	HV: VA	HW-HY: FR			HZ: SA	H0: N/A	JS: JP	JT-JV: MN			JW-JX: NO		JY: JO	JZ: ID	J0: N/A
H1: N/A	H2: CY	H3: PA	H4: SB	H5: N/A	H6-H7: NI		H8-H9: PA		J1: N/A	J2: DJ	J3: GD	J4: GR	J5: GW	J6: LC	J7: DM	J8: VC	J9: N/A
First character L									First character O								
LA-LI: NO									OA-OC: PE			OD: LB	OE: AT	OF-OI: FI			
LJ-LN: NO					LO-LR: AR				OJ: FI	OK-OL: CZ		OM: SK	ON-OR: BE				
LS-LW: AR					LX: LU	LY: LT	LZ: BG	L0: N/A	OS-OT: BE		OU-OZ: DK						O0: N/A
L1: N/A	L2-L9: AR								O1-O9: N/A								
First character P									First character S								
PA-PI: NL									SA-SI: SE								
PJ: AN	PK-PO: ID					PP-PR: BR			SJ-SM: SE				SN-SR: PL				
PS-PY: BR							PZ: SR	P0: N/A	SS: EG/SD	ST: SD	SU: EG	SV-SZ: GR					S0: N/A
P1: N/A	P2: PG	P3: CY	P4: AW	P5-P9: KP					S1: N/A	S2-S3: BD		S4: N/A	S5: SI	S6: SG	S7: SC	S8: ZA	S9: ST
First character T									First character U								
TA-TC: TR			TD: GT	TE: CR	TF: IS	TG: GT	TH: FR	TI: CR	UA-UI: RU								
TJ: CM	TK: FR	TL: CF	TM: FR	TN: CG	TO-TQ: FR			TR: GA	UJ-UM: UZ				UN-UQ: KZ				UR: UA
TS: TN	TT: TD	TU: CI	TV-TX: FR			TY: BJ	TZ: ML	T0: N/A	US-UZ: UA								U0: N/A
T1: N/A	T2: TV	T3: KI	T4: CU	T5: SO	T6: AF	T7: SM	T8: PW	T9: N/A	U1-U9: N/A								
First character V									First character X								
VA-VG: CA							VH-VI: AU		XA-XI: MX								
VJ-VN: AU					VO: CA	VP-VQ: GB		VR: HK	XJ-XO: CA						XP: DK	XQ-XR: CL	
VS: GB	VT-VW: IN				VX-VY: CA		VZ: AU	V0: N/A	XS: CN/TW	XT: BF	XU: KH	XV: VN	XW: LA	XX: MO	XY-XZ: MM		X0: N/A
V1: N/A	V2: AG	V3: BZ	V4: KN	V5: NA	V6: FM	V7: MH	V8: BN	V9: N/A	X1-X9: N/A								
First character Y									First character Z								
YA: AF	YB-YH: ID							YI: IQ	ZA: AL	ZB-ZI: GB							
YJ: VU	YK: SY	YL: LV	YM: TR	YN: NI	YO-YR: RO				ZJ: GB	ZK-ZM: NZ			ZN-ZO: GB		ZP: PY	ZQ: GB	ZR: ZA
YS: SV	YT-YU: RS		YV-YY: VE				YZ-Y0: N/A		ZS-ZU: ZA			ZV-ZZ: BR					Z0: N/A
Y1: N/A	Y2-Y9: DE								Z1: N/A	Z2: ZW	Z3: MK	Z4-Z7: N/A				Z8: SS	Z9: N/A
First character 3									First character 4								
3A: MC	3B: MU	3C: GQ	3D: SZ/FJ	3E-3F: PA		3G: CL	3H-3I: CN/TW		4A-4C: MX			4D-4I: PH					
3J-3R: CN/TW									4J-4K: AZ		4L: GE	4M: VE	4N: N/A	4O: ME	4P-4R: LK		
3S-3U: CN/TW			3V: TN	3W: VN	3X: GN	3Y: NO	3Z: PL	30: N/A	4S: LK	4T: PE	4U: XU	4V: HT	4W: TL	4X: IL	4Y: XA	4Z: IL	40: N/A
31-39: N/A									41-49: N/A								
First character 5									First character 6								
5A: LY	5B: CY	5C-5G: MA					5H-5I: TZ		6A-6B: EG		6C: SY	6D-6I: MX					
5J-5K: CO		5L-5M: LR		5N-5O: NG		5P-5Q: DK		5R: MG	6J: MX	6K-6N: KR				6O: SO	6P-6R: PK		
5S: MG	5T: MR	5U: NE	5V: TG	5W: WS	5X: UG	5Y-5Z: KE		50: N/A	6S: PK	6T-6U: SD		6V-6W: SN		6X: MG	6Y: JM	6Z: LR	60: N/A
51-59: N/A									61-69: N/A								
First character 7									First character 8								
7A-7I: ID									8A-8I: ID								
7J-7N: JP					7O: YE	7P: LS	7Q: MW	7R: DZ	8J-8N: JP					8O: BW	8P: BB	8Q: MV	8R: GY
7S: SE	7T-7Y: DZ						7Z: SA	70: N/A	8S: SE	8T-8Y: IN						8Z: SA	80: N/A
71-79: N/A									81-89: N/A								
First character 9									Full first-character allocations								
9A: HR	9B-9D: IR			9E-9F: ET		9G: GH	9H: MT	9I: ZM	B: CN (TW); F: FR; G: GB; I: IT K: US; M: GB; N: US; Q: XQ R: RU; W: US; 2: GB								
9J: ZM	9K: KW	9L: SL	9M: MY	9N: NP	9O-9R: CD				B: CN (TW); F: FR; G: GB; I: IT K: US; M: GB; N: US; Q: XQ R: RU; W: US; 2: GB								
9S-9T: CD		9U: BI	9V: SG	9W: MY	9X: RW	9Y-9Z: TT		90: N/A	B: CN (TW); F: FR; G: GB; I: IT K: US; M: GB; N: US; Q: XQ R: RU; W: US; 2: GB								
91-99: N/A									B: CN (TW); F: FR; G: GB; I: IT K: US; M: GB; N: US; Q: XQ R: RU; W: US; 2: GB								

Linked country codes are from ISO 3166-1.

Series allocated to an international organization.
Provisional allocation in accordance with No. S19.33: "Between radiocommunication conferences, the Secretary-General is authorized to deal with questions relating to changes in the allocation of series of call signs, on a provisional basis, and subject to confirmation by the following conference."
Half series allocation. The first country listed uses all callsigns beginning with the listed prefix followed by A-M, and the second country listed uses N-Z.

View this list arranged by nation
Nation	Call signs allocated
Afghanistan	T6, YA
Albania	ZA
Algeria	7R, 7T-7Y
Andorra	C3
Angola	D2-D3
Antigua and Barbuda	V2
Argentina	AY-AZ, L2-L9, LO-LW
Armenia	EK
Aruba	P4
Australia	AX, VH-VN, VZ
Austria	OE
Azerbaijan	4J-4K
Bahamas	C6
Bahrain	A9
Bangladesh	S2-S3
Barbados	8P
Belarus	EU-EW
Belgium	ON-OT
Belize	V3
Benin	TY
Bhutan	A5
Bolivia	CP
Bosnia and Herzegovina	E7 (Was T9 prior to 7 Aug 2007)
Botswana	A2, 8O
Brazil	PP-PY, ZV-ZZ
Brunei	V8
Bulgaria	LZ
Burkina Faso	XT
Burundi	9U
Cambodia	XU
Cameroon	TJ
Canada	CF-CK, CY-CZ, VA-VG, VX-VY, XJ-XO
Canada	VO (Newfoundland)
Cape Verde	D4
Central African Republic	TL
Chad	TT
Chile	CA-CE, XQ-XR, 3G
China (People's Republic of) (see also Taiwan)	B, XS, 3H-3U
China (People's Republic of) (see also Taiwan)	VR (Hong Kong), XX (Macao)
Colombia	HJ-HK, 5J-5K
Comoros	D6
Congo (Democratic Republic of)	9O-9T
Congo (Republic of)	TN
Cook Islands	E5
Costa Rica	TE, TI
Croatia	9A
Cuba	CL-CM, CO, T4
Cyprus	C4, H2, P3, 5B
Czech Republic	OK-OL
Denmark	OU-OZ, XP, 5P-5Q
Djibouti	J2
Dominica	J7
Dominican Republic	HI
Ecuador	HC-HD
Egypt	SSA-SSM, SU, 6A-6B
El Salvador	HU, YS
Equatorial Guinea	3C
Eritrea	E3
Estonia	ES
Eswatini (Swaziland)	3DA-3DM
Ethiopia	ET, 9E-9F
Fiji	3DN-3DZ
Finland	OF-OJ
France (and its Overseas departments/territories)	F, HW-HY, TH, TK, TM, TO-TQ, TV-TX
Gabon	TR
Gambia	C5
Georgia	4L
Germany	DA-DR, Y2-Y9
Ghana	9G
Greece	J4, SV-SZ
Grenada	J3
Guatemala	TD, TG
Guinea	3X
Guinea-Bissau	J5
Guyana	8R
Haiti	HH, 4V
Honduras	HQ-HR
Hungary	HA, HG
Iceland	TF
India	AT-AW, VT-VW, 8T-8Y
Indonesia	JZ, PK-PO, YB-YH, 7A-7I, 8A-8I
Iran	EP-EQ, 9B-9D
Iraq	HN, YI
Ireland	EI-EJ
Israel	4X, 4Z
Italy	I
Ivory Coast	TU
Jamaica	6Y
Japan	JA-JS, 7J-7N, 8J-8N
Jordan	JY
Kazakhstan	UN-UQ
Kenya	5Y-5Z
Kiribati	T3
North Korea	HM, P5-P9
South Korea	DS-DT, D7-D9, HL, 6K-6N
Kuwait	9K
Kyrgyzstan	EX
Laos	XW
Latvia	YL
Lebanon	OD
Lesotho	7P
Liberia	A8, D5, EL, 5L-5M, 6Z
Libya	5A
Liechtenstein (uses prefixes allocated to Switzerland)	HB (HB0, HB3Y, HBL)
Lithuania	LY
Luxembourg	LX
Madagascar	5R-5S, 6X
Malawi	7Q
Malaysia	9M, 9W
Maldives	8Q
Mali	TZ
Malta	9H
Marshall Islands	V7
Mauritania	5T
Mauritius	3B
Mexico	XA-XI, 4A-4C, 6D-6J
Micronesia	V6
Moldova	ER
Monaco	3A
Mongolia	JT-JV
Montenegro	4O
Morocco	CN, 5C-5G
Mozambique	C8-C9
Myanmar	XY-XZ
Namibia	V5
Nauru	C2
Nepal	9N
Netherlands	PA-PI
Netherlands	PJ (Netherlands Antilles)
New Zealand	ZK-ZM
Nicaragua	HT, H6-H7, YN
Niger	5U
Nigeria	5N-5O
Niue	E6
North Macedonia	Z3
Norway	JW-JX, LA-LN, 3Y
Oman	A4
Pakistan	AP-AS, 6P-6S
Palau	T8
Palestinian Authority	E4
Panama	HO-HP, H3, H8-H9, 3E-3F
Papua New Guinea	P2
Paraguay	ZP
Peru	OA-OC, 4T
Philippines	DU-DZ, 4D-4I
Poland	HF, SN-SR, 3Z
Portugal	CQ-CU
Qatar	A7
Romania	YO-YR
Russia	R, UA-UI
Rwanda	9X
Saint Kitts and Nevis	V4
Saint Lucia	J6
Saint Vincent and the Grenadines	J8
Samoa (Western Samoa)	5W
San Marino	T7
São Tomé and Príncipe	S9
Saudi Arabia	HZ, 7Z, 8Z
Senegal	6V-6W
Serbia	YT-YU
Seychelles	S7
Sierra Leone	9L
Singapore	9V, S6
Slovakia	OM
Slovenia	S5
Solomon Islands	H4
Somalia	6O, T5
South Africa	S8, ZR-ZU
Spain	AM-AO, EA-EH
Sri Lanka	4P-4S
Sudan	SSN-STZ, 6T-6U
Suriname	PZ
Sweden	SA-SM, 7S, 8S
Switzerland (see also Liechtenstein)	HB, HE
Syria	YK, 6C
Tajikistan	EY
Taiwan (uses prefixes allocated to China)	B (BM, BN, BO, BQ, BV, BX)
Tanzania	5H-5I
Thailand	E2, HS
Timor–Leste (East Timor)	4W
Togo	5V
Tonga	A3
Trinidad and Tobago	9Y-9Z
Tunisia	TS, 3V
Turkey	TA-TC, YM
Turkmenistan	EZ
Tuvalu	T2
Uganda	5X
Ukraine	EM-EO, UR-UZ
United Arab Emirates	A6
United Kingdom (and Overseas Territories/Crown Dependencies)	2, G, M, VP-VQ, VS, ZB-ZJ, ZN-ZO, ZQ
United States of America	AA-AL, K, N, W
Uruguay	CV-CX
Uzbekistan	UJ-UM
Vanuatu	YJ
Vatican City	HV
Venezuela	YV-YY, 4M
Vietnam	XV, 3W
Yemen	7O
Zambia	9I-9J
Zimbabwe	Z2

Organization	Call signs allocated
International Civil Aviation Organization	4Y
United Nations	4U
World Meteorological Organization	C7

Call Sign Series	Allocated to
AA–AL	United States
AM–AO	Spain
AP–AS	Pakistan
AT–AW	India
AX	Australia
AY–AZ	Argentina
A2	Botswana
A3	Tonga
A4	Oman
A5	Bhutan
A6	United Arab Emirates
A7	Qatar
A8	Liberia
A9	Bahrain
B	China
B (BM-BQ, BU-BX)	Taiwan
CA–CE	Chile
CF–CK	Canada
CL–CM	Cuba
CN	Morocco
CO	Cuba
CP	Bolivia
CQ–CU	Portugal
CV–CX	Uruguay
CY–CZ	Canada
C2	Nauru
C3	Andorra
C4	Cyprus
C5	The Gambia
C6	The Bahamas
C7	World Meteorological Organization (Note: Series allocated to an international organization.)
C8–C9	Mozambique
DA–DR	Germany
DS–DT	South Korea
DU–DZ	Philippines
D2–D3	Angola
D4	Cape Verde
D5	Liberia
D6	Comoros
D7–D9	South Korea
EA–EH	Spain
EI–EJ	Ireland
EK	Armenia
EL	Liberia
EM–EO	Ukraine
EP–EQ	Iran
ER	Moldova
ES	Estonia
ET	Ethiopia
EU–EW	Belarus
EX	Kyrgyzstan
EY	Tajikistan
EZ	Turkmenistan
E2	Thailand
E3	Eritrea
E4	Palestinian Authority
E5	Cook Islands
E6	Niue (Note: Provisional allocation in accordance with No. S19.33: (Between radiocommunication conferences, the Secretary-General is authorized to deal with questions relating to changes in the allocation of series of call signs, on a provisional basis, and subject to confirmation by the following conference.)^{"Recent Changes". ITU.})
E7	Bosnia and Herzegovina
F	France (and its Overseas departments/territories)
G	United Kingdom (and its overseas territories/Crown dependencies)
HA	Hungary
HB	Switzerland
HB (HB0, HB3Y, HBL)	Liechtenstein (uses prefixes allocated to Switzerland)
HC–HD	Ecuador
HE	Switzerland
HF	Poland
HG	Hungary
HH	Haiti
HI	Dominican Republic
HJ–HK	Colombia
HL	South Korea
HM	North Korea
HN	Iraq
HO–HP	Panama
HQ–HR	Honduras
HS	Thailand
HT	Nicaragua
HU	El Salvador
HV	Vatican City
HW–HY	France (and its Overseas departments/territories)
HZ	Saudi Arabia
H2	Cyprus
H3	Panama
H4	Solomon Islands
H6–H7	Nicaragua
H8–H9	Panama
I	Italy
JA–JS	Japan
JT–JV	Mongolia
JW–JX	Norway
JY	Jordan
JZ	Indonesia
J2	Djibouti
J3	Grenada
J4	Greece
J5	Guinea-Bissau
J6	Saint Lucia
J7	Dominica
J8	Saint Vincent and the Grenadines
K	United States
LA–LN	Norway
LO–LW	Argentina
LX	Luxembourg
LY	Lithuania
LZ	Bulgaria
L2–L9	Argentina
M	United Kingdom (and its overseas territories/Crown dependencies)
N	United States
OA–OC	Peru
OD	Lebanon
OE	Austria
OF–OJ	Finland
OK–OL	Czech Republic
OM	Slovakia
ON–OT	Belgium
OU–OZ	Denmark
PA–PI	Netherlands
PJ	Netherlands – Former Netherlands Antilles
PK–PO	Indonesia
PP–PY	Brazil
PZ	Suriname
P2	Papua New Guinea
P3	Cyprus
P4	Aruba
P5–P9	North Korea
R	Russia
SA–SM	Sweden
SN–SR	Poland
SSA–SSM	Egypt (Note: Half-series allocation.)
SSN–SSZ	Sudan
SU	Egypt
SV–SZ	Greece
S2–S3	Bangladesh
S5	Slovenia
S6	Singapore
S7	Seychelles
S8	South Africa
S9	São Tomé and Príncipe
TA–TB–TC	Turkey
TD	Guatemala
TE	Costa Rica
TF	Iceland
TG	Guatemala
TH	France (and its Overseas departments/territories)
TI	Costa Rica
TJ	Cameroon
TK	France (and its Overseas departments/territories)
TL	Central African Republic
TM	France (and its Overseas departments/territories)
TN	Republic of the Congo
TO–TQ	France (and its Overseas departments/territories)
TR	Gabon
TS	Tunisia
TT	Chad
TU	Ivory Coast
TV–TX	France (and its Overseas departments/territories)
TY	Benin
TZ	Mali
T2	Tuvalu
T3	Kiribati
T4	Cuba
T5	Somalia
T6	Afghanistan
T7	San Marino
T8	Palau
UA–UI	Russia
UJ–UM	Uzbekistan
UN–UQ	Kazakhstan
UR–UZ	Ukraine
VA–VG	Canada
VH–VN	Australia
VO	Canada (formerly Dominion of Newfoundland)
VP–VQ	United Kingdom (and its overseas territories/Crown dependencies)
VR	Hong Kong (Special administrative regions of China)
VS	United Kingdom
VT–VW	India
VX–VY	Canada
VZ	Australia
V2	Antigua and Barbuda
V3	Belize
V4	Saint Kitts and Nevis
V5	Namibia
V6	Federated States of Micronesia
V7	Marshall Islands
V8	Brunei
W	United States
XA–XI	Mexico
XJ–XO	Canada
XP	Denmark
XQ–XR	Chile
XS	China
XT	Burkina Faso
XU	Cambodia
XV	Vietnam
XW	Laos
XX	Macao (Special administrative regions of China)
XY–XZ	Burma
YA	Afghanistan
YB–YH	Indonesia
YI	Iraq
YJ	Vanuatu
YK	Syria
YL	Latvia
YM	Turkey
YN	Nicaragua
YO–YR	Romania
YS	El Salvador
YT–YU	Serbia
YV–YY	Venezuela
Y2–Y9	Germany
ZA	Albania
ZB–ZJ	United Kingdom (and its overseas territories/Crown dependencies)
ZK–ZM	New Zealand
ZN–ZO	United Kingdom (and its overseas territories/Crown dependencies)
ZP	Paraguay
ZQ	United Kingdom (and its overseas territories/Crown dependencies)
ZR–ZU	South Africa
ZV–ZZ	Brazil
Z2	Zimbabwe
Z3	North Macedonia
Z8	South Sudan
2	United Kingdom (and its overseas territories/Crown dependencies)
3A	Monaco
3B	Mauritius
3C	Equatorial Guinea
3DA–3DM	Eswatini
3DN–3DZ	Fiji
3E–3F	Panama
3G	Chile
3H–3U	China
3V	Tunisia
3W	Vietnam
3X	Guinea
3Y	Norway
3Z	Poland
4A–4C	Mexico
4D–4I	Philippines
4J–4K	Azerbaijan
4L	Georgia
4M	Venezuela
4O	Montenegro
4P–4S	Sri Lanka
4T	Peru
4U	United Nations
4V	Haiti
4W	Timor-Leste
4X	Israel
4Y	International Civil Aviation Organization
4Z	Israel
5A	Libya
5B	Cyprus
5C–5G	Morocco
5H–5I	Tanzania
5J–5K	Colombia
5L–5M	Liberia
5N–5O	Nigeria
5P–5Q	Denmark
5R–5S	Madagascar
5T	Mauritania
5U	Niger
5V	Togo
5W	Western Samoa
5X	Uganda
5Y–5Z	Kenya
6A–6B	Egypt
6C	Syria
6D–6J	Mexico
6K–6N	South Korea
6O	Somalia
6P–6S	Pakistan
6T–6U	Sudan
6V–6W	Senegal
6X	Madagascar
6Y	Jamaica
6Z	Liberia
7A–7I	Indonesia
7J–7N	Japan
7O	Yemen
7P	Lesotho
7Q	Malawi
7R	Algeria
7S	Sweden
7T–7Y	Algeria
7Z	Saudi Arabia
8A–8I	Indonesia
8J–8N	Japan
8O	Botswana
8P	Barbados
8Q	Maldives
8R	Guyana
8S	Sweden
8T–8Y	India
8Z	Saudi Arabia
9A	Croatia
9B–9D	Iran
9E–9F	Ethiopia
9G	Ghana
9H	Malta
9I–9J	Zambia
9K	Kuwait
9L	Sierra Leone
9M	Malaysia
9N	Nepal
9O–9T	Democratic Republic of the Congo
9U	Burundi
9V	Singapore
9W	Malaysia
9X	Rwanda
9Y–9Z	Trinidad and Tobago

== See also ==
- Aircraft registration
- Amateur radio call signs
- Call-sign allocation plan
- Multiservice tactical brevity code
- Non-ITU prefix
