= Mistflower =

Mistflower may refer to several plant species in the tribe Eupatorieae.

- Ageratina riparia, native to Mexico, Cuba and Jamaica, and an invasive species in New Zealand and many tropical areas
- Members of the genus Conoclinium native to Canada, the United States and northern Mexico:
  - Conoclinium betonicifolium, Padre Island mistflower
  - Conoclinium coelestinum, blue mistflower
  - Conoclinium dissectum, palm-leaf mistflower
