= Falmer =

Village and parish in East Sussex, England

Coordinates: 50.88°N 0.09°W

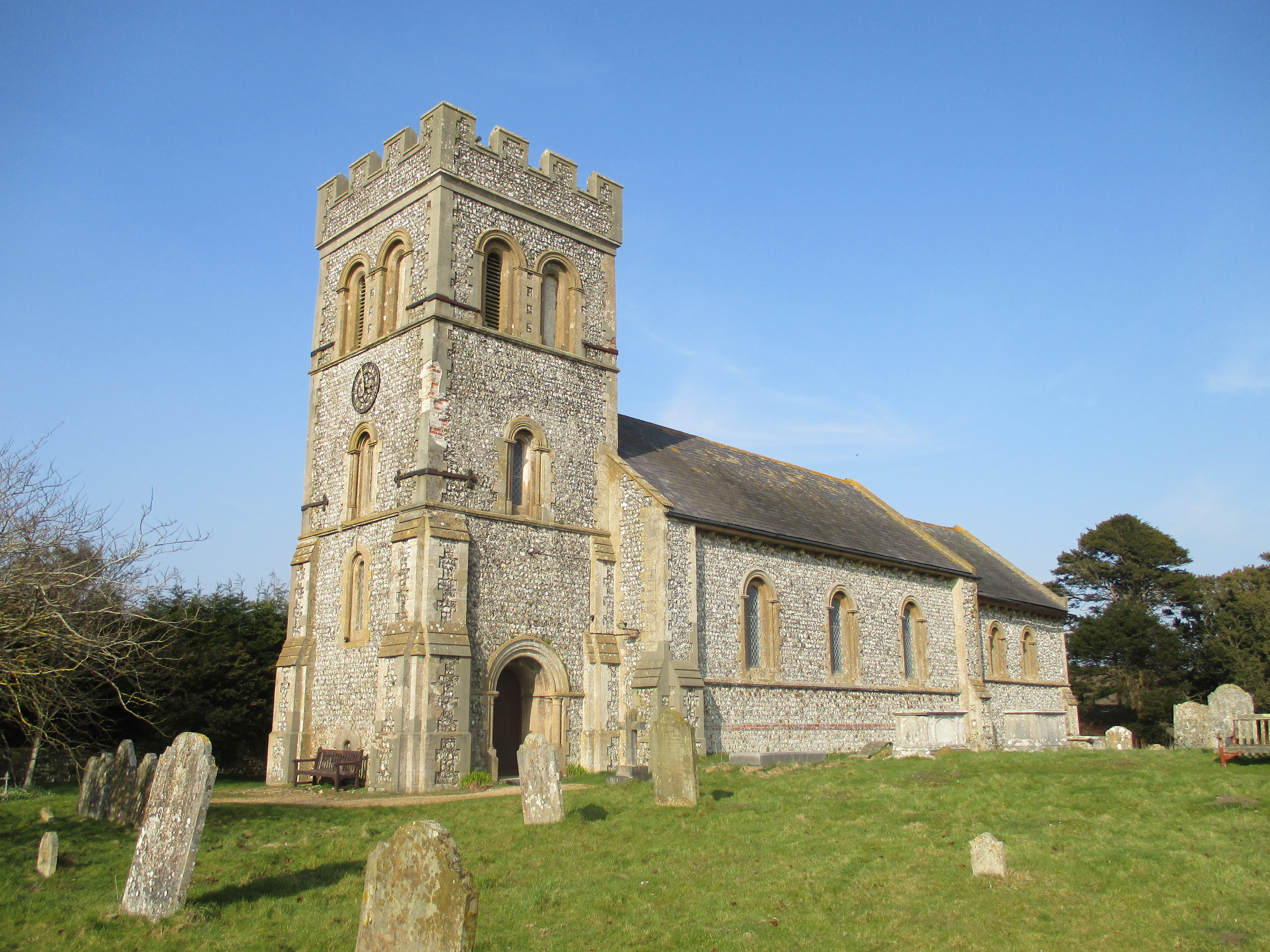
- Church of St. Laurence

- Location within East Sussex
- Area: 17.0 km^{2} (6.6 sq mi)
- Population: 284 (Parish-2011)
  - Density: 43/sq mi (17/km^{2})
- OS grid reference: TQ347105
  - London: 43 miles (69 km) N
- District: Lewes
- Shire county: East Sussex
- Region: South East
- Country: England
- Sovereign state: United Kingdom
- Post town: BRIGHTON
- Postcode district: BN1
- Dialling code: 01273
- Police: Sussex
- Fire: East Sussex
- Ambulance: South East Coast
- UK Parliament: Lewes

Falmer is a small village and civil parish in the Lewes District of East Sussex, England, lying between Brighton and Lewes, approximately five miles (8 km) north-east of the former. It is also the site of Brighton & Hove Albion's Falmer Stadium.

Falmer village is divided by the A27 road. North of the dual carriageway are a few houses and a pub, with a footbridge linking to the southern part of the village, where a large pond is encircled by cottages and the parish church, dedicated to St. Laurence. The two halves of the village are also linked by a road bridge just outside this circle of houses. The village pond is home to a population of ducks and geese, and is very likely to account for the name of the village. The village is recorded in the Domesday Book as 'Falemere' which is likely to be Saxon for "fallow mere" and mean a dark pool.

The campuses of the University of Sussex, the University of Brighton, and The Keep, are all nearby.

== History ==
Before the Norman Conquest of England, the manor of Falmer was held by Wilton Abbey. The Domesday Book describes the village as having 43 households: 35 villagers, 7 smallholders and 1 slave. The entry includes ploughlands, meadow, woodland and a church. After the conquest most of it appears to have been given to Gundred, wife of William de Warenne, 1st Earl of Surrey. In the 11th century the village name was variously spelled Falemela, Falemere or Felesmere. There is a 13th-century thatched barn, hidden from view behind the church, which was used by the monks of Lewes Priory for storing corn.

Edward II visited Falmer in 1324. Charles I granted the manor to Edward Ditchfield in 1628 or 1629 and he sold it to William Craven. At this time its manor extended over 3,060 acres (1,240 ha). The Cravens lost it because of their support of the King during the English Civil War.

Due to the proximity of Falmer to the city of Brighton and Hove, the parish has been substantially affected by the twentieth-century development of its large neighbour. Since the 1960s it has been home to the University of Sussex campus, and in the 1990s, the former Brighton Polytechnic Falmer campus became a principal base of the University of Brighton. The village lends its name to the University of Sussex's alumni magazine.

== Notable buildings and areas ==
Notable areas around Falmer

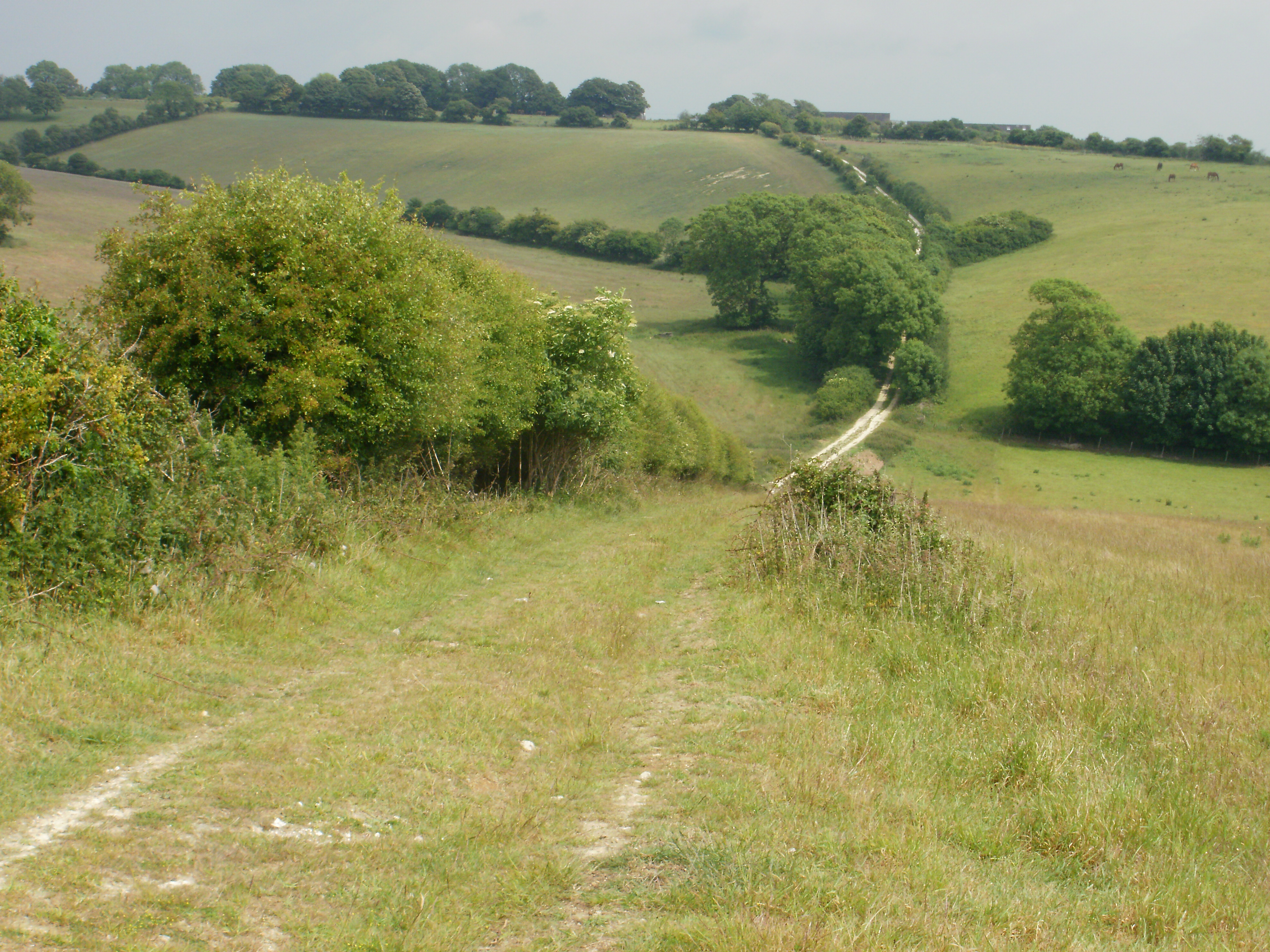
Path to Balmer Farm

The Falmer parish when viewed from above has the shape of the African continent (see link to the parish map in the External links section below). However, the parish, like the village, has been divided by the fast A27, breaking the cohesiveness. On both sides of the road, the contours of the Downland are impressive to behold and, for the most part, even the noise of the road is contained within the A27 valley. The landscape has many visible layers of history. In the slanting light of late afternoon prehistoric and medieval lynchets show up on the slopes of High Park, St Mary's Farm and Green Broom.

Sadly despite its long history and its beauty, only a few fragments of ancient Down pasture survive. The minutes of the old Brighton Council Farmlands Committee show that time after time they consented to the ploughing and ultimate wasting of the ancient landscape. The chalk grasslands that the National Trust describe as Europe's tropical rainforests, and which are known to support up to 40 species of flowering plants in one square metre, have largely been destroyed since the Second World War by modern agricultural methods.

The South Downs Way passes through the parish from the south east to the north west and crosses the A27 at Housedean Farm. Falmer parish sits between Brighton and Hove to its west, St Ann Without parish (and then Lewes) to its east, Kingston parish to its south and the long thin parishes running down the scarp slopes to its north, which include Ditchling, Westmeston, Streat, Plumpton, East Chiltington, St John Without, and Hamsey from northwest to northeast.

=== South of the A27 ===
To the south of the A27 is the south half of the village, which includes the church and the large village pond. The Falmer Road travels south to Woodingdean and to the sea at Rottingdean. The downland to the east of the road is part of Falmer parish. To the west are the Falmer Stadium and the University of Brighton which is in City of Brighton and Hove.

==== Falmer Church ====
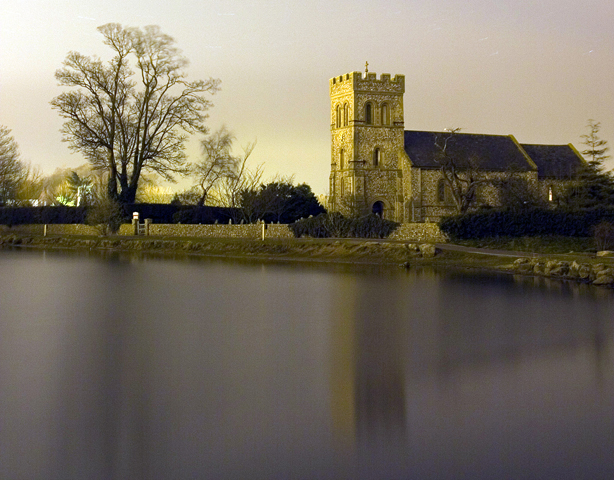
Falmer church and pond

Falmer church is dedicated to St. Laurence. The church was built in 1649. It consists of a west tower, a nave and chancel with a vestry to its north. It has a gallery and organ loft at the west end of the nave. It is particularly special because of the pond just outside it.

==== Falmer pond ====
Perhaps what is most special about this village is its large gravel pond, which is a focal point of the village from where the village and parish got its name. Many people come from Brighton and Lewes to enjoy the pond and the green beside it, to picnic here and watch the ducks.

==== Falmer Court Barn ====
Behind the church is a manorial thatched barn of fourteen embayments which dates back to the 13th century. It is one of the largest medieval barns in Sussex and was used by the monks of Lewes Priory, who owned the manor, for threshing and storing corn. Falmer barn is a grade II* listed building.

In 2006, the barn, other vernacular farm buildings, and the farmhouse were sold by Brighton and Hove City Council to the tenant farmer, who "promptly sold them on to a property developer."

==== Cranedean Plantation ====
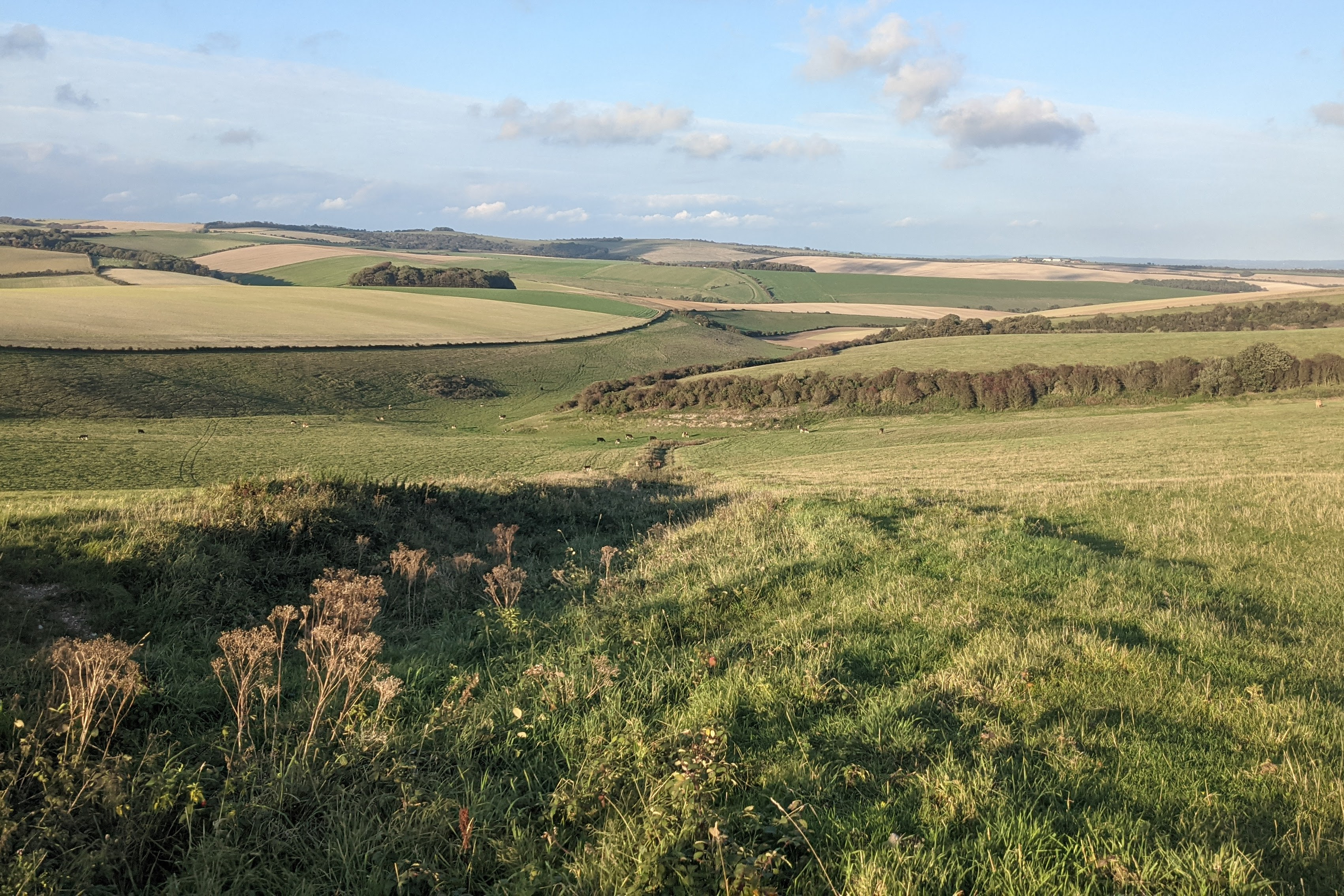
Earthworks in Loose Bottom, looking towards Cranedean Plantation and New Barn Valley

By A27, east of the Falmer village, lies a clump of trees called the Cranedean Plantation (TQ 363 087). The name 'Cranedean' is a corruption of 'Crane Down' although cranes are wetland birds and would not be seen on these hills. It has been suggested that the name relates to bustard. 'Bustard' is an old French name, whereas 'crane' is a Saxon name, so it has been speculated that shepherds and ploughmen may have used the latter term in medieval times. The bustard is likely to have lived in the area. It has some old beeches, particularly at its north end, though the wood is strewn with tumbled hulks from the 1987 gales.

==== New Barn valley ====
New Barn valley (TQ 369 087) is east of the Cranedean Plantation and west of the Newmarket garage and cottages. The spur behind shelters the valley from the noisy A27 corridor so it is still peaceful. New Barn was built in 1845. It has two yards and a shepherd's room, complete with blackened fireplace, so the shepherd could attend the sheep round-the-clock during lambing.

There are several tumps that look like possible barrows at the top of the slope (TQ 371 085) south of the barn, next to the South Downs Way. The bank behind the barn has the flowers and insects of old Down pasture.

==== Loose Bottom ====
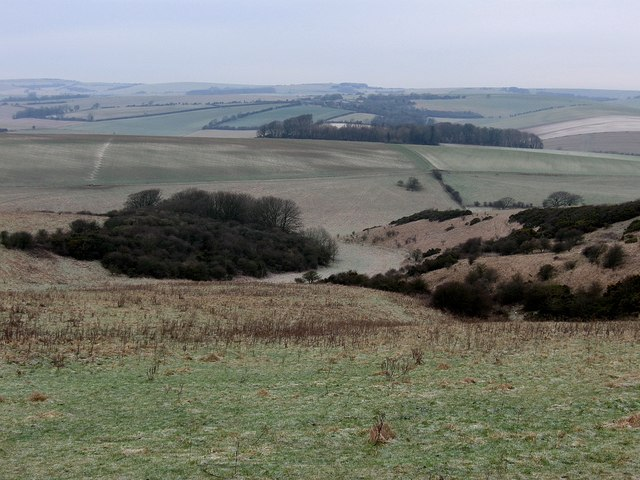
Looking Down Towards Loose Bottom

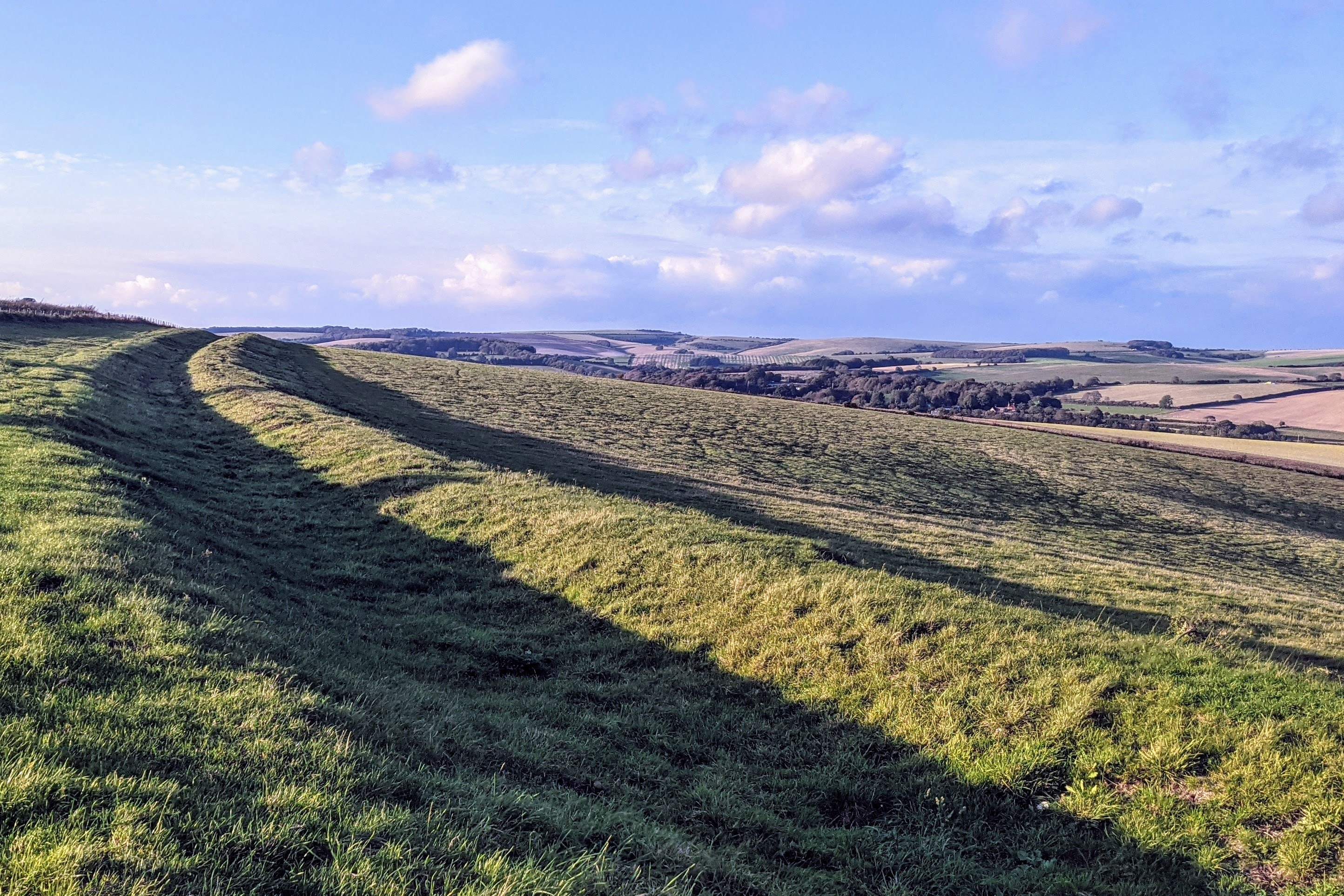
Earthworks in Loose Bottom running along the side of Falmer Road

Half a mile south east of Falmer village are the scrubby pastures of Loose Bottom (TQ 362 080), part ancient and part restored to permanent pasture since 1987. Most of these erstwhile heathy Down pastures were bulldozed for corn after 1948, but the slopes in Loose Bottom were saved by their steepness. The name 'Loose' is derived from a Saxon word for a livestock enclosure ('hlose', in Saxon) (TQ 365 080), and refers to two ancient earthwork banks that run in the Bottom (both scheduled monuments). Both were probably Saxon cattle enclosures. One runs alongside the Falmer Road before dropping into the head of the valley. There are scattered clumps of burnet rose along large sections of the earthwork banks of both enclosures.

The fragments of surviving Down pasture have now been fenced back into a restored pasture block and the historical chalk grassland flowers are returning. There is now cowslip, wild orchid, devil's-bit, betony, rampion and chalk milkwort. There are adonis blue butterflies and emperor moth benefiting from the pasture's restoration.

==== Newmarket Plantation ====
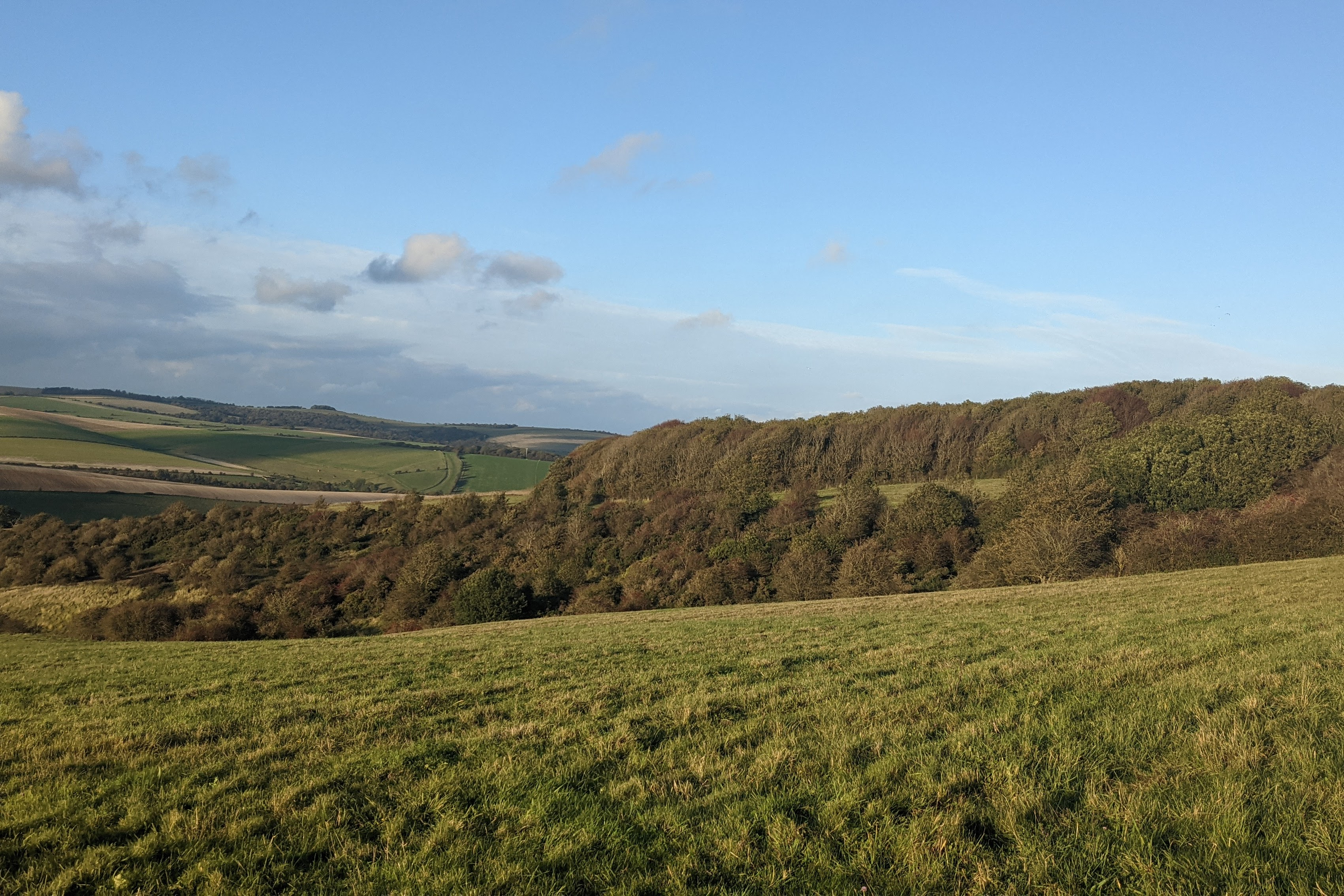
Newmarket Plantation as seen from Loose Bottom

The Newmarket Plantation (TQ 367 080) lies on the eastern edge of Loose Bottom and the parish and west of the South Downs Way. It is a small deciduous woodland of 2.20 hectares (5.4 acres) with beech, ash and sycamore and new plantings. There are mown paths circle its interior since the storms of 1987 and is a place of big upturned rootplates, which is home to many wren and robin.

=== North of the A27 ===
To the north of the A27 is the north half of the village, which is like a quadrant around a small grazed field. The pub is one corner of the quadrant. To the west, just outside of the parish, is the University of Sussex. To the north, north west and north east is special downland, with much history.

==== Farms ====
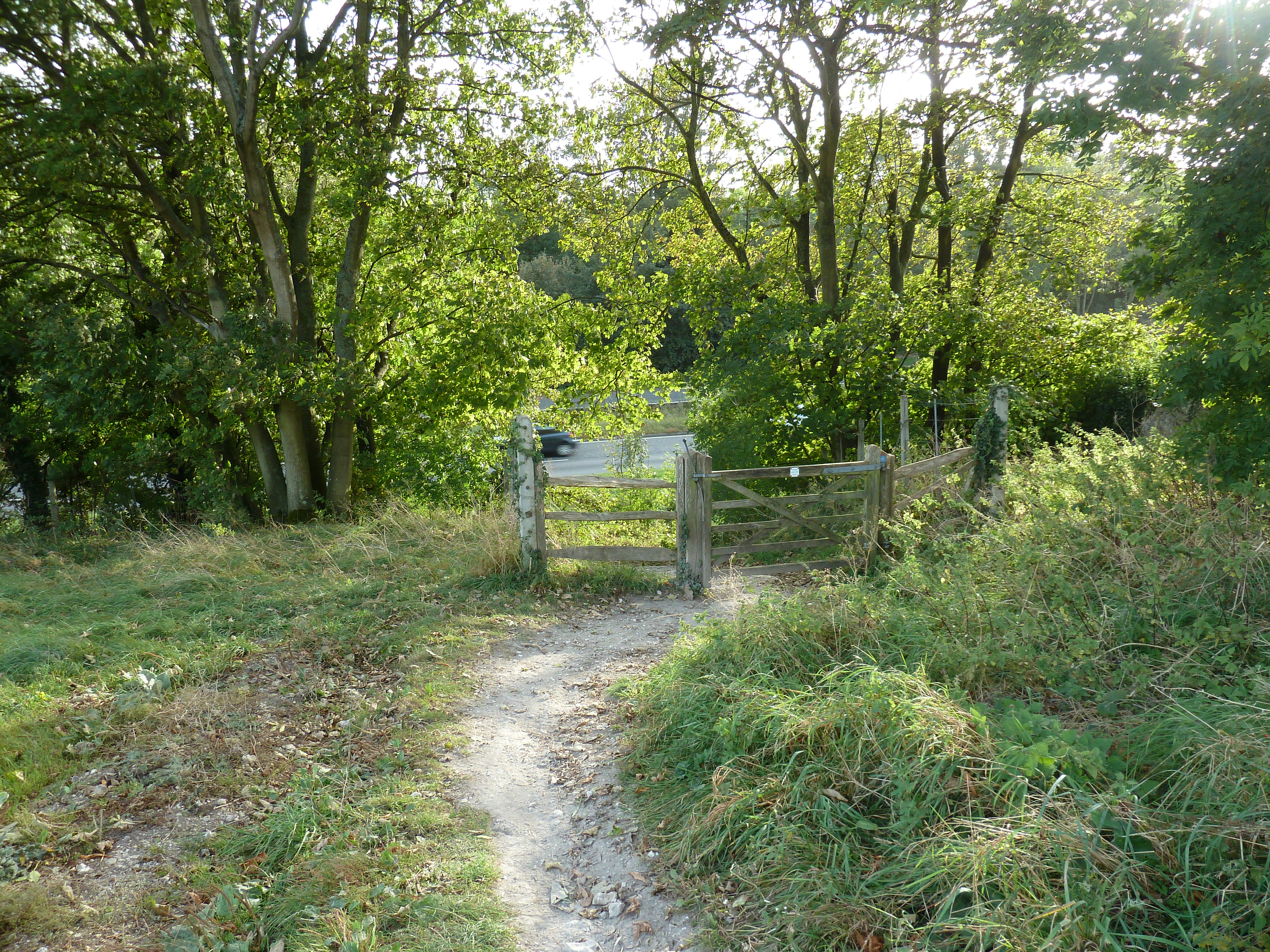
Stile on the South Downs Way by Housedean Farm

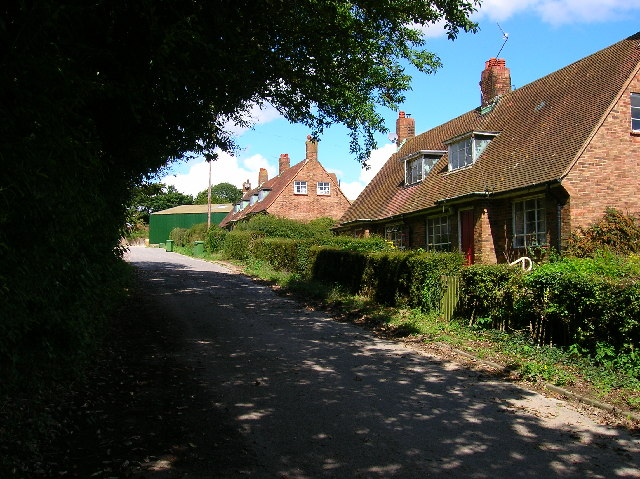
Balmer hamlet and farm, near Falmer

In Falmer village, at the T-junction between Mill Road and Ridge Road is Park Wall Farm. Running north from Falmer village, half way along Ridge Road and west of Balmer Farm, is the ruins of Ridge Farm (TQ 350 099). Now a good place for birdlife, such as yellowhammer, it was the start of the route of the biggest of the mass trespasses that marked the Sussex campaign for the right to roam in 1998–9. Carry on north down Ridge Road and at the end is St Mary's Farm.

Housedean Farm (TQ 369 092) is east along the A27. It manages part of Balmer Down, was one of the last on these Downs to use an ox team for tillage, only giving up in 1914. Balmer Farm (TQ 358 099) lies on the site of the Saxon hamlet of Bergemere. Its name comes from the Saxon "the pool by the burh". It was sufficiently important at Domesday to have two slaves, a manorial church, swine pastures in the Weald at Horsted Keynes and Birchgrove, and brookland meadow south of Lewes still called 'Bormer Brook'. The church has long gone but you can still trace the outlines of the hamlet green under the mess of modern farm clutter. Big blackthorn hedges mark the bounds of the medieval open fields of the hamlet, which drop away southwards from the farmstead (TQ 357 096). They went under the evocative names of Lanthorne Laine, Church Laine and Barren Laine.

==== Moon's Plantation ====
Moon's Plantation (TQ 348 103) is planted woodland of 6.46 hectares (16.0 acres). It is mainly beech and at the southern end are in uniformed lines.

Moon's Corner slope (TQ 348 100), known locally as Sunny Bank, is a little slope that lies north east of Sussex University and west of Ridge Road. It is flowery meadow with orange tip butterflies in the small woodland glades in the spring and a swathe of devil's bit scabious in late summer. The bank is shadowy until midday when it becomes alive with insects and butterflies, including brimstone, brown argus, marbled white, small and common blue and clouded yellow. In autumn many migrants stop off in the meadow and common redstarts and spotted flycatchers are regularly seen on a stop over before their flight over the English Channel.

==== Waterpit Hill ====
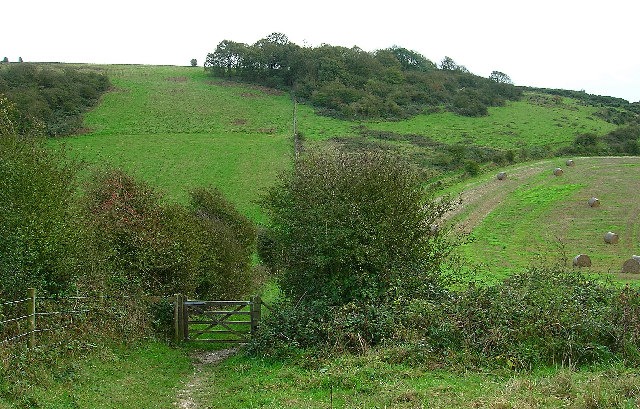
Waterpit Hill

A short walk past Ridge Farm ruins is Waterpit Hill (TQ 352 105). The south facing slope is intensively farmed, although in the field there is the song of skylarks and along the path hedges there are nesting yellowhammer. David Bangs, a Sussex field naturalists, says, "The north-facing slope of Waterpit Hill is one of the most attractive old Down pasture slopes on the Brighton Downs plateau". Given its richness as pristine Downland character, it was a good candidate to become Access land after the right to roam act in 2000. There is little scrub, except at its eastern end, and a lot of colour including cowslips, orchids, harebell, yellow rattle, devil's bit, wild carrot and picnicker's thistle. The northerly aspect brings Neckera crispa moss and the scarce scree Snail, Abida secale, in places.

==== Balmer Down ====
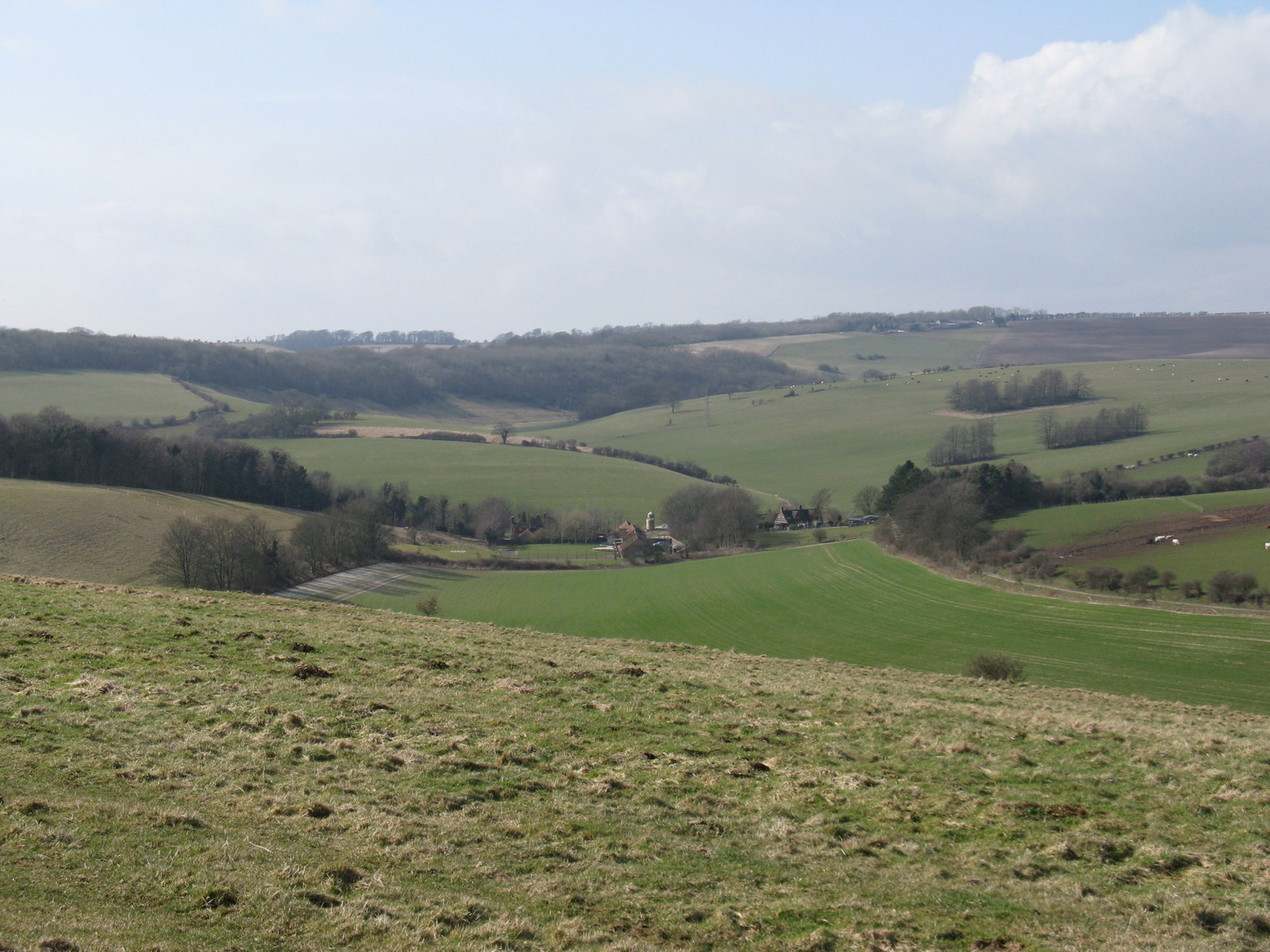
View west from Balmer Huff

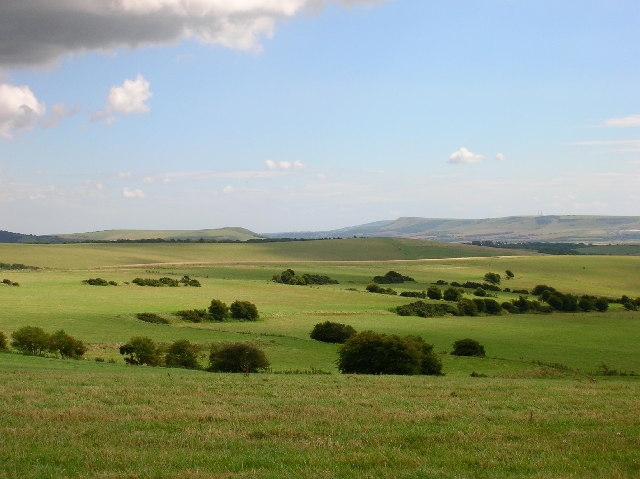
Medieval field system near Balmer Down

On Balmer Down are two scheduled monuments, Buckland Hole and Balmer Huff. The two Iron Age and Romano-British villages lay opposite one another. One village was on the spur of the Huff and the other was across Buckland Hole on the ridge where the South Downs Way now runs. At the head of Buckland Hole lay their cemetery, a circular platform of flints and soil some 60 yards (55 m) across. Before it was ploughed out, one could make out a banked roadway, a strange enclosure that has been called their circus or moot, and many pits and platforms that used to be found in their field scape, The cemetery yielded up more than twenty funerary urns when it was excavated in 1849. Still now, when one looks down from the Balmer Huff into Buckland Hole one sees a whole valley filled with a pattern of rectangular banks, often topped with gorse or thorn. These are the fossilized fields of the villages. The lineaments are signs of a farmed landscape from two thousand years ago and more and are comparable to the tiny fields in the west of Cornwall or Ireland. Unfortunately, before the area was scheduled, it was intensively farmed and much of the historical evidence has been destroyed.

Also special in areas like this is archaic vegetation, but here, even in the steeper parts of the valley that were not ploughed, modern agribusiness sprays have meant the Down pasture vegetation has been lost and now only the occasional steep lynchet retains a smidgeon of that old flora. Nevertheless, there are still great views of vale of the Lewes Brooks, Kingston Hill and a sliver of Seaford Head cliffs. There are still a scatter of sarsen debris, fossils, yellowed flints that are characteristic of hilltop clay-with-flint, as well as Romano-British pottery to be found in the area and cornfield flowers growing amongst the stones, including common field speedwell, green field speedwell, scarlet pimpernel, knotgrass, field madder and common orache.

==== Moustone ====
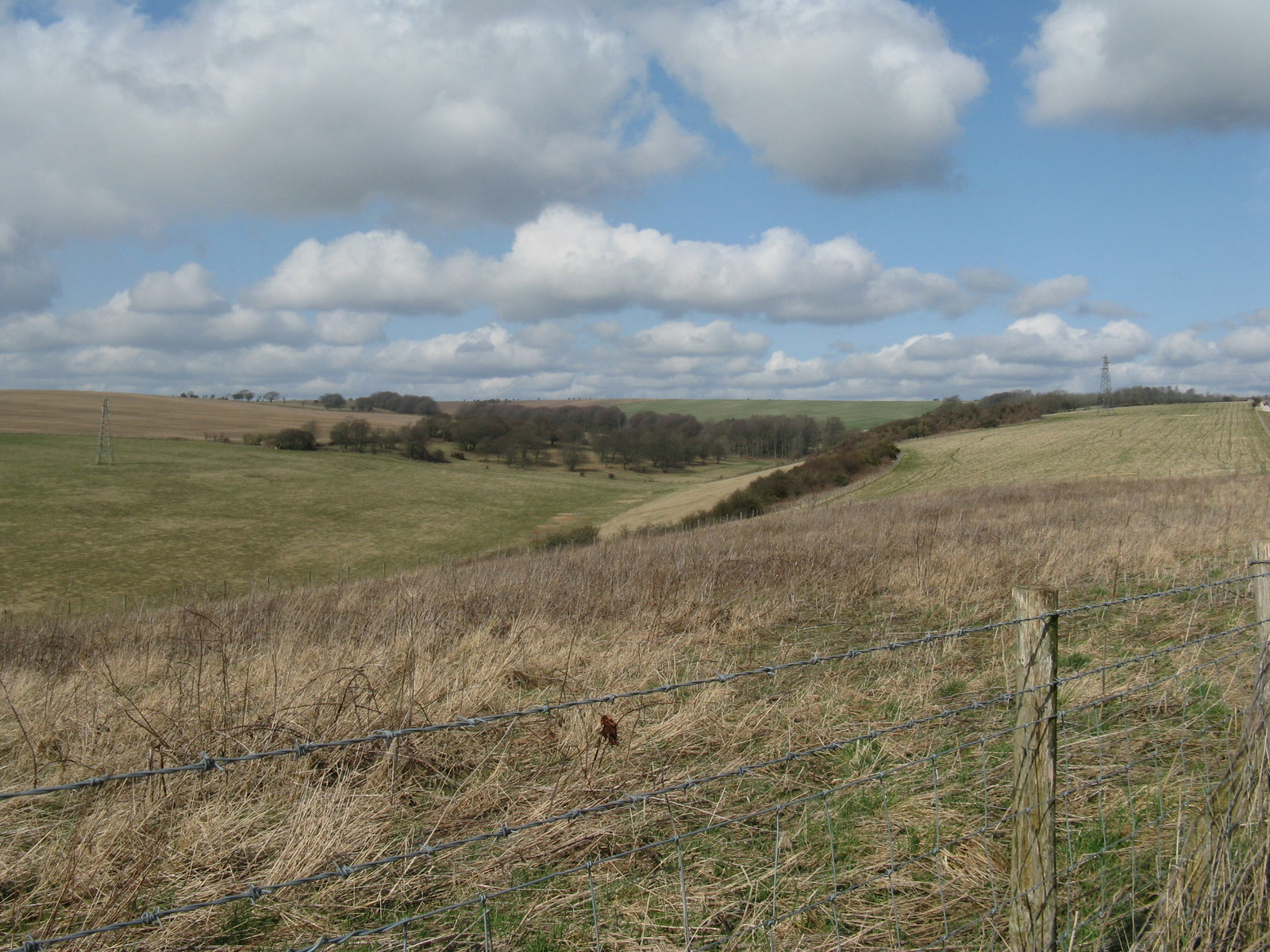
View north to Moustone

Along the downland path north east of Falmer, past Waterpit Hill, north of Balmer Farm and southeast of Blackcap is Moustone (TQ 363 117). It is a slope west of the footpath and was an independent farm when the Domesday book was written, but is now part of Balmer Farm. To the south was the sarsen stone that gave it its name (TQ 361 110) It is now a lonely place of Roe Deer, Hare and Kestrel. The slope's turf is more acidic than Waterpit, with more tormentil and wild strawberry, and most of the old Down pasture herbs are there such as spring sedge, cowslip, rockrose, wild basil, hairy violet and devil's bit scabious.

==== Four Lord's Burgh ====
The Four Lord's Burgh (TQ 365 116) is at the point where the South Down Way turns southeasterly. The area is so named because this point was the point where four manorial boundaries came together and each manor had a 'lord'. The manorial boundaries are now parishes and include Falmer, St John Without, East Chiltington and Plumpton. The boundaries were often aligned on prehistoric features and in the past there were about five round barrows here. Only the two barrows over the fence on the western side of the north–south track still exist as slight tumps, while the rest have been ploughed out.

Due west of Four Lord's Burgh lies a triangle of wood pasture (TQ 362 117) with the pleasing character of a park, now grazed by Sussex cattle. It lies over the boney Lynchets of the field system of the Iron Age and Bronze Age people that farmed this landscape. In August it is rich downland meadow flowers including harebells, rockrose, red clover, eggs and bacon, and scabious. There is much Bracken on the western side, and shady sycamore and oak and occasional gorse.

=== Northwest of the parish ===
The north west of the parish is to the west of St Mary's Farm. These areas are north of the University of Sussex and Stanmer Park and used for extensively by walkers and mountain bikers. Millbank Wood, Highpark Wood, Green Broom, Flint Heap and Granny's Belt are all woodlands in the area.

==== Stanmer Down ====
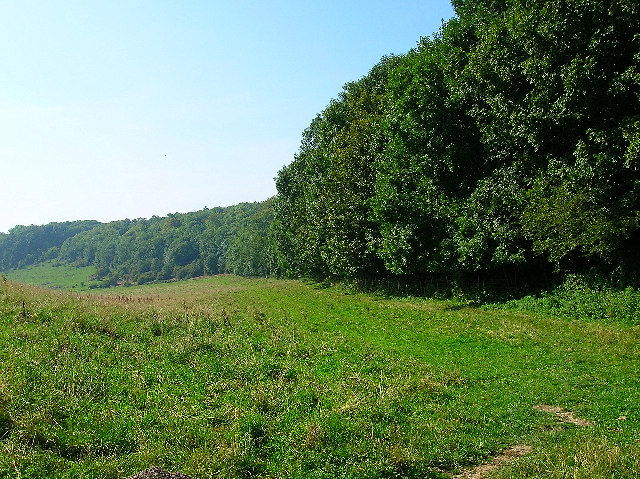
Moon's Bottom sandwiched between Stanmer Down and Millbank Wood

North west of St Mary's Farm, and east of Millbank Wood and Highpark Wood, is Shambledean Bottom, Bow Hill and Stanmer Down. The whole of Stanmer Down (TQ 34 11) used to be covered with prehistoric field systems, and on the top of Bow Hill there may have been as many as nine barrows in two clusters. It survived unploughed until the second world war, but it was left derelict and large areas of it turned to scrub. Since then it has been cleared and cultivated except for islands of scrub kept for pheasant cover. Now the visible signs of the ancient peoples have gone, except when the shadows are long and sharp.

The steep slopes of the bridlepath (TQ 342 116), west of Bow Hill, have kept the chalk grassland meadows through cattle grazing and mowing. There is a scatter of thorn, gorse, wild strawberries, harebells and cowslips that help support a healthy butterfly population which includes small copper, small heath and common blue. At its northern end, over the fence-line, there is a tiny fragment of Down pasture on the downslope edge of the thicket (TQ 344 120). It has survived in isolation, surrounded by arable, for as much as 150 years, perhaps by rabbit grazing.

==== Moon's Bottom ====
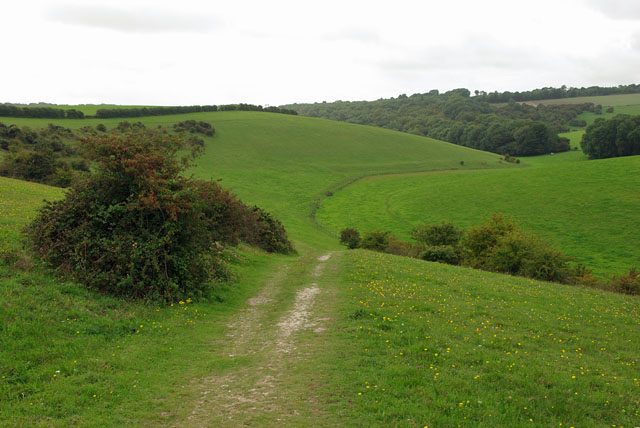
From Bow Hill to Moon Bottom

At the bottom of Stanmer Down, Moon's Bottom (TQ 340 106) was intensively farmed, but has been transformed from its derelict state by good scrub control and cattle grazing. It has a cool and mossy slope lying under the shade of Millbank Wood (TQ 338 105) to the southwest. There are cowslips in spring and in late summer it has a sky-blue dusting of small scabious. Some parts of it have a slightly acidic soil chemistry, with tormentil, sweet vernal-grass and field wood-rush. On the flat ground above the eastern end of this slope is a scrub-covered round barrow (TQ 343 106).

==== Green Broom, Flint Heap and Granny's Belt ====
Green Broom and Flint Heap (TQ 330 110) have large, old beeches and fallen giants, but only Green Broom is used extensively as mountain bike track and has some large jumps for those brave enough. The fallen trees have great fungal assemblages. The very rare lion's mane fungus (Hericium erineus) has been found in at least two places as well as dog stinkhorn (Mutinus caninus), bird's nest fungus (Cyathus striatus), yellow stainer (Agaricus xanthodermus), Earth stars (Geastrum triplex), lots of turkey tail (Trametes versicolor), and many others. If one is lucky (or unlucky depending on your disposition) one might even smell the distinctive aroma of the ordinary stinkhorn, Phallus impudicus,

Near to Granny's Belt (TQ 334 105) there are reports that a sarsen stone circle existed till the 19th century. Although this may not be an authentic stone circle, there must still be many sarsens in situ, perhaps like the one exposed by excavations at Rocky Clump.

==== Rocky Clump ====
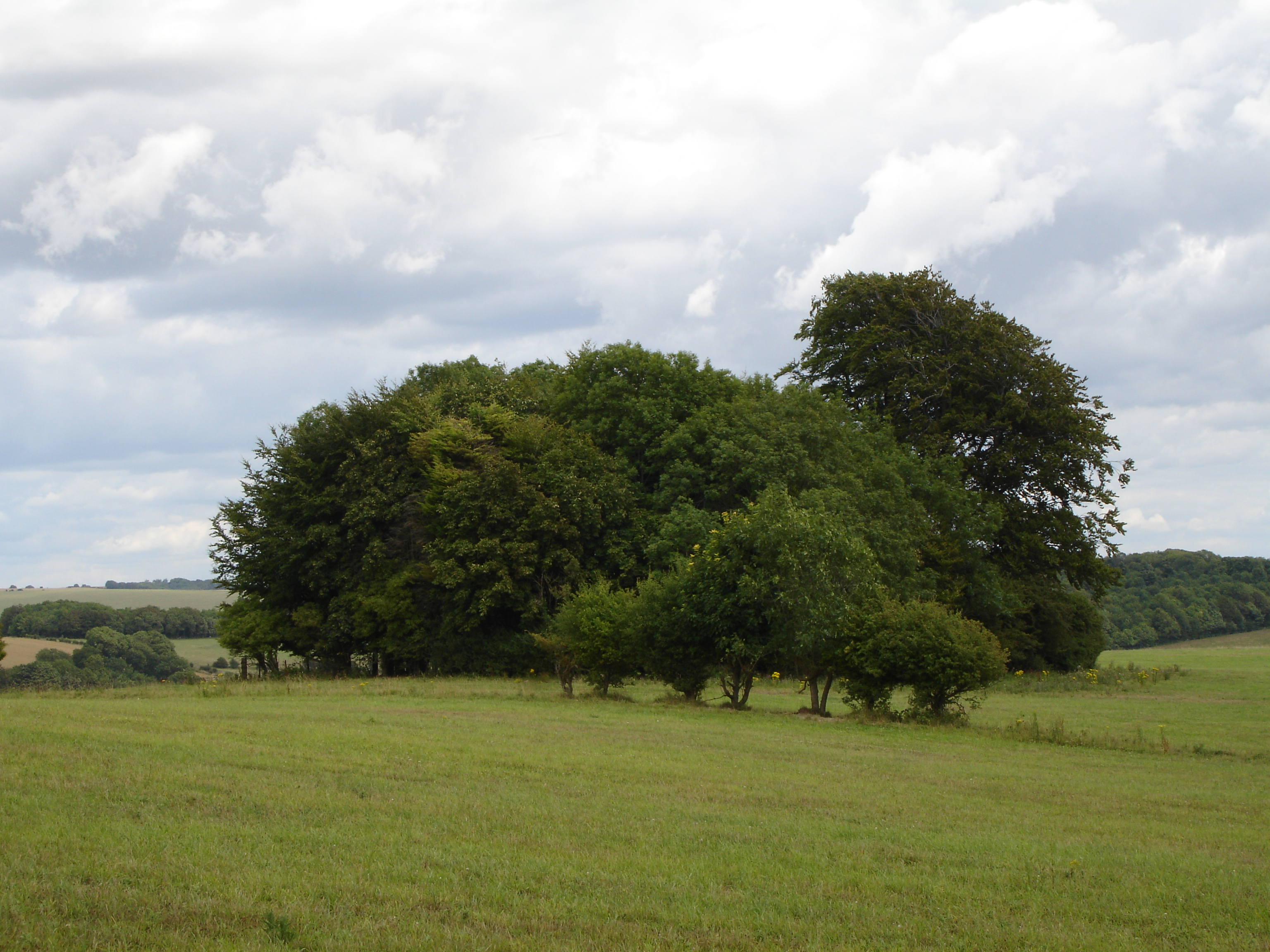
Rocky Clump

Rocky Clump (TQ 328 101), east of Upper Lodge Wood, was a late Iron Age/Romano-British site. There is a huge sarsen stone in the trees as well as evidence for a Roman grain storage building and pit almost 2 metres deep. After the Romans left, it is thought to have been used as a pagan Saxon temple known as 'Paeccel's Weoh'. 'Weoh' is Saxon for 'sacred place', or even 'temple'. The name was corrupted to Patchway, which became the modern name until recently for the whole Ditchling Road ridge between Upper Lodge Wood and Hollingbury Hill. The area was named in the Saxon charter of 765 AD and the parish boundary is aligned through it.

== Governance ==
At a local level Falmer is governed by Falmer Parish Council. Its responsibilities include footpaths, street lighting, playgrounds and minor planning applications. The parish council has five seats.

The next level of government is the district council. The parish of Falmer lies within the Kingston ward of Lewes District Council, which returns a single seat to the council.

East Sussex County Council is the next tier of government, for which Falmer is within the Newhaven and Ouse Valley West division, with responsibility for Education, Libraries, Social Services, Civil Registration, Trading Standards and Transport. Elections for the County Council are held every four years.

Falmer is represented in the UK Parliament by the Lewes constituency. The current serving MP is the Liberal Democrat James MacCleary who won the seat in the 2024 general election.

== Sport ==
Lewes Priory Cricket Club play some home games in Falmer and have Sussex and Brighton universities students and staff as members.

=== Stadium ===
To the west of the parish is the site of Falmer Stadium, home of Brighton & Hove Albion F.C. Despite its name and proximity to Falmer, it is actually inside the City of Brighton and Hove boundary. After a lengthy process including a public enquiry, it was approved by the Office of the Deputy Prime Minister in 2005, but Lewes District Council subsequently mounted a legal challenge and overturned the decision on a technicality. The stadium was reapproved by Secretary of State Hazel Blears on 24 July 2007. The 30,500-seater stadium opened in July 2011.

== Falmer station ==
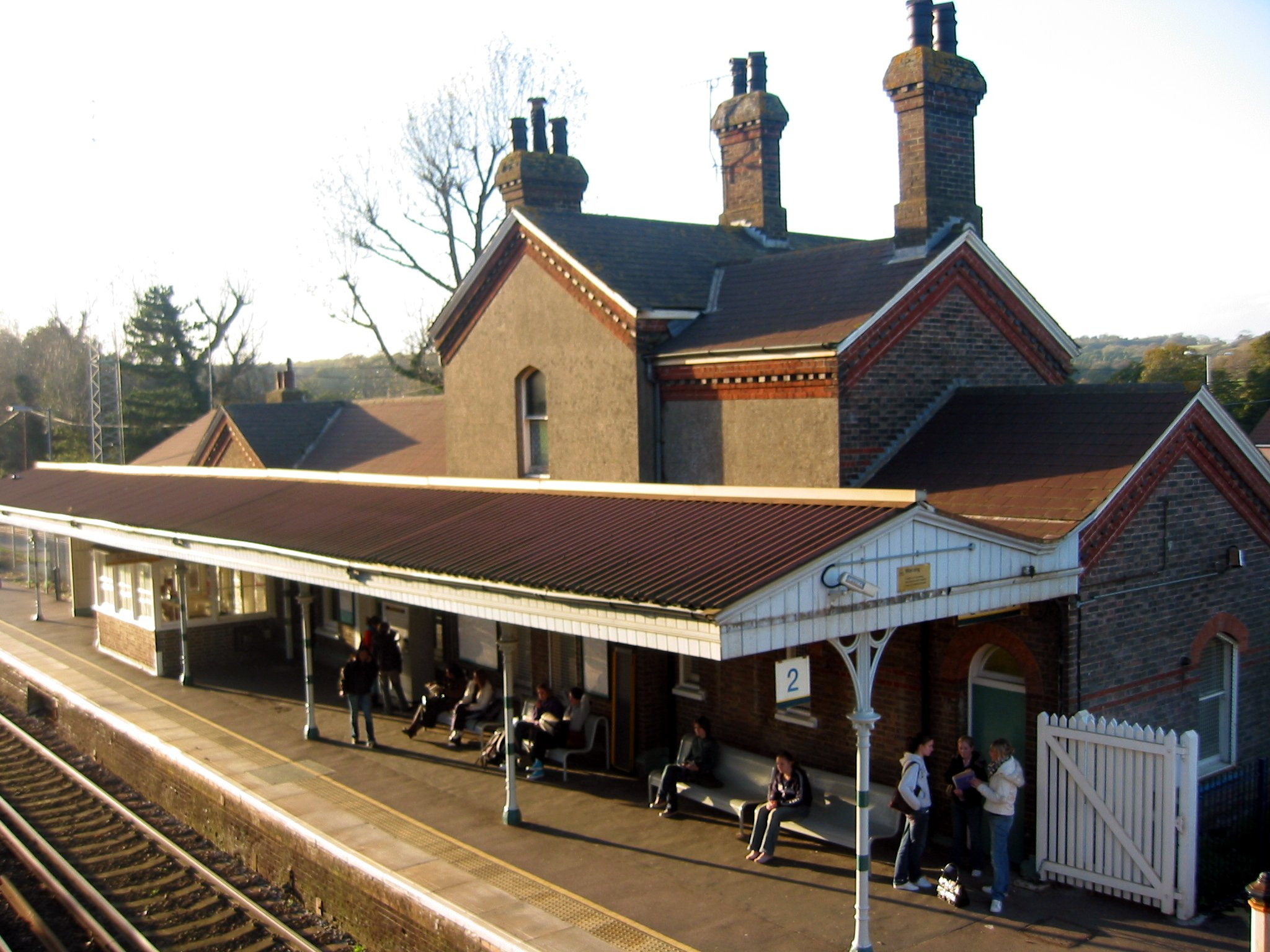
Falmer Railway Station

Falmer is served by Falmer railway station which lies on the East Coastway line.
