= Conoclinium mayfieldii =

Scientific classification
- Kingdom: Plantae
- Clade: Tracheophytes
- Clade: Angiosperms
- Clade: Eudicots
- Clade: Asterids
- Order: Asterales
- Family: Asteraceae
- Genus: Conoclinium
- Species: C. mayfieldii

Binomial name
- Conoclinium mayfieldii T.F.Patterson

Species of flowering plant

Conoclinium mayfieldii is a Mexican species of flowering plants in the family Asteraceae. It has a discontinuous distribution, found in the Sierra Madre Occidental in Chihuahua and Durango, and also in the Sierra Madre Oriental in Tamaulipas. These two mountain ranges are separated by the Chihuahuan Desert, 400 km wide.

Conoclinium mayfieldii is a reclining herb up to 70 cm (28 inches) tall. Leaves are opposite, egg-shaped. The plant usually produces several flower heads, each with blue or lavender disc florets but no ray florets.

The species is named for American botanist Mark H. Mayfield.
