= Falmer railway station =

Railway station in East Sussex, England

Falmer
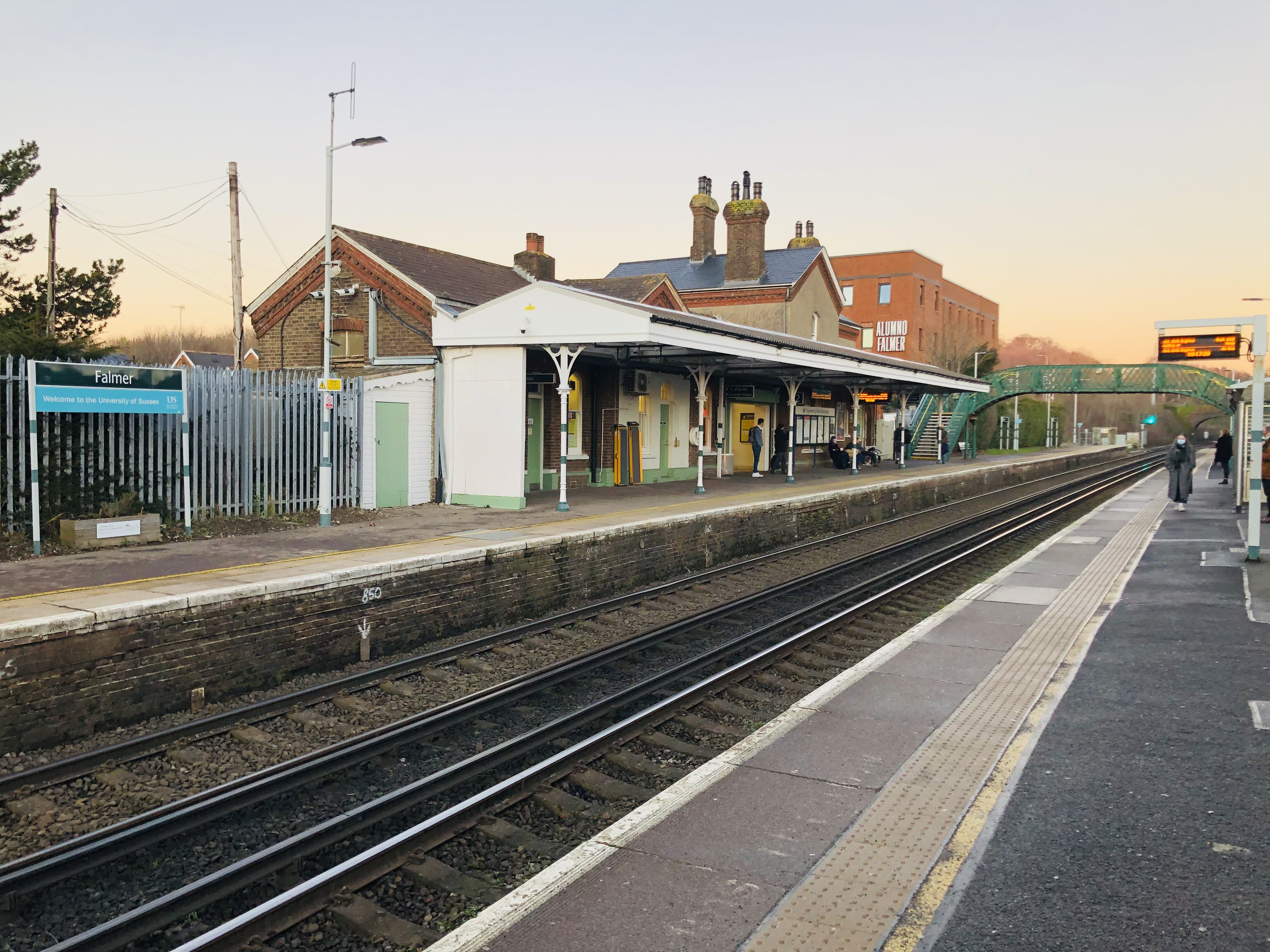
- The platforms at Falmer, looking north-east

General information
- Location: Falmer, Brighton and Hove, England
- Coordinates: 50°51′43″N 0°05′14″W
- Grid reference: TQ347086
- Manager: Southern
- Platforms: 2

Other information
- Station code: FMR
- Classification: DfT category E

History
- Original company: Brighton, Lewes and Hastings Railway
- Pre-grouping: London, Brighton and South Coast Railway
- Post-grouping: Southern Railway

Key dates
- 8 June 1846: Opened
- 1 August 1865: Resited
- 1890: Rebuilt

Passengers
- 2021/22: ▲0.904 million
- 2022/23: ▲1.158 million
- 2023/24: ▲1.211 million
- 2024/25: ▲1.421 million
- 2025/26: ▲2.022 million
Location
Notes
- Passenger statistics from the Office of Rail and Road

Falmer railway station serves the Falmer suburb of the city of Brighton and Hove, in East Sussex, England. It lies on the East Coastway line, 3 miles 39 chains (3.49 miles, 5.61 km) from Brighton. The station is operated by Southern, which also operates all services.

The station also serves the eastern suburbs of Woodingdean and Rottingdean, the University of Sussex campus, the University of Brighton's Falmer campus and the Falmer Stadium, home of Brighton & Hove Albion F.C..

== History ==
The original station was approximately 53 chains east of its present location and opened on 8 June 1846. It was moved to its present location, much closer to the village, on 1 August 1865 and was rebuilt in 1890. The buildings on the down (eastbound) platform date from this time, but modern replacements have been installed on the westbound side.

=== Accident ===
On 6 June 1851, a train derailed soon after departing for Lewes, resulting in the death of five people.

After striking a sleeper, which had been placed on the track by trespassers, most of the train crashed down into the road below. Although the immediate cause was the striking of the sleeper, the official inquiry determined that the train had been travelling too fast: that if it had been travelling within the recommended speed limit, it would not have derailed. The inquiry also determined that operating the train with the engine going backwards reduced the driver's visibility.

== Services ==
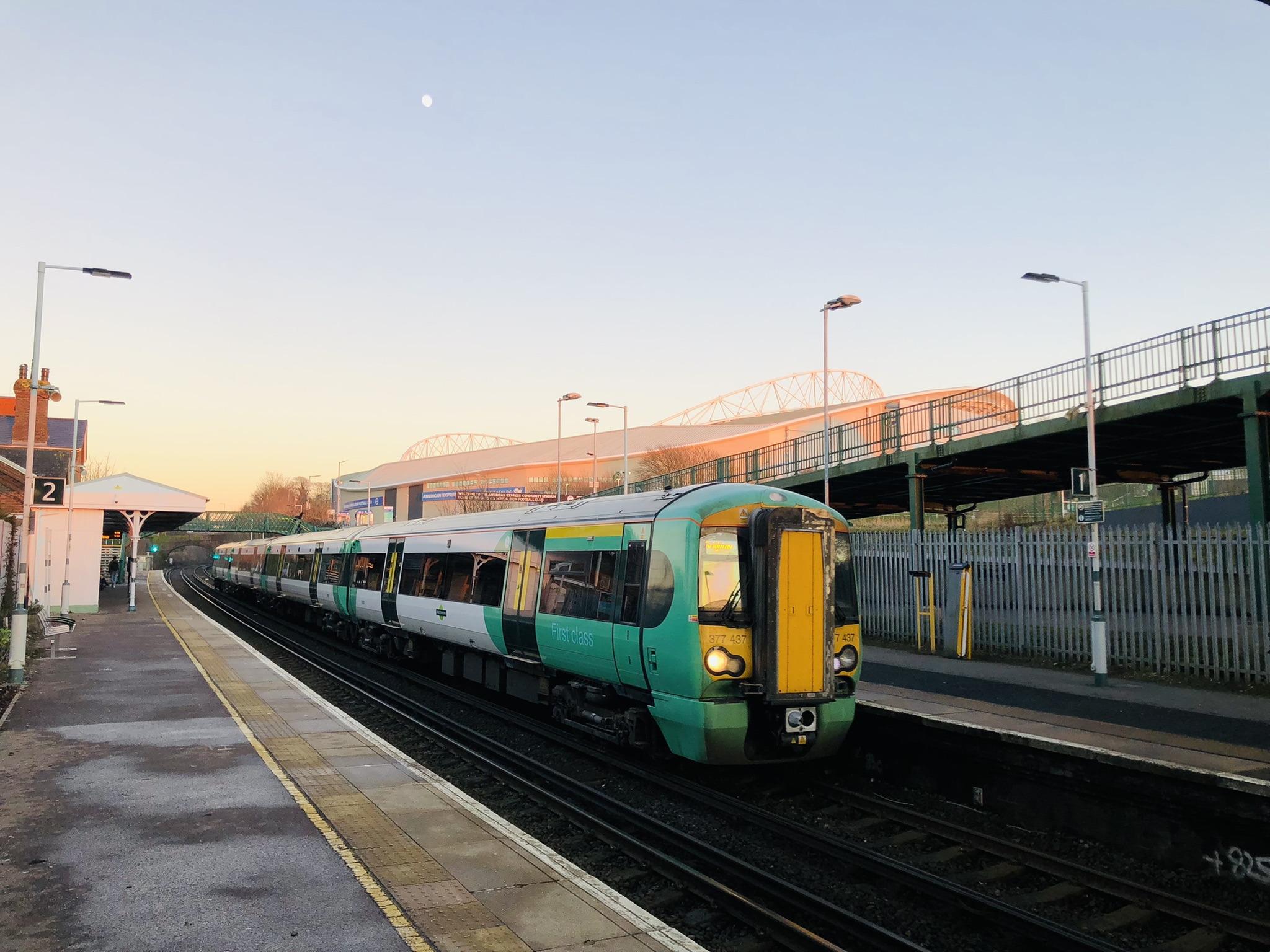
A Class 377 electric multiple unit approaching Falmer, with a Southern to Brighton; the Falmer Stadium is visible in the background

All services at Falmer are operated by Southern; the typical off-peak service in trains per hour (tph) is:

- 4 tph to Brighton
- 2 tph to Seaford
- 1 tph to Eastbourne (all stations)
- 1 tph to Ore, via Hastings (semi-fast).

When Brighton & Hove Albion FC matches take place at the Falmer Stadium, additional matchday-only trains operate from the station to Brighton and Lewes. Most usual services are run with additional carriages and the platforms at the station have been extended to accommodate the longer trains. A queuing system is in operation in both directions after full-time at the stadium.

Preceding station	National Rail	Following station
Moulsecoomb	Southern East Coastway Line	Lewes
