= Brighton railway disaster =

Fatal train derailment that occurred in 1851

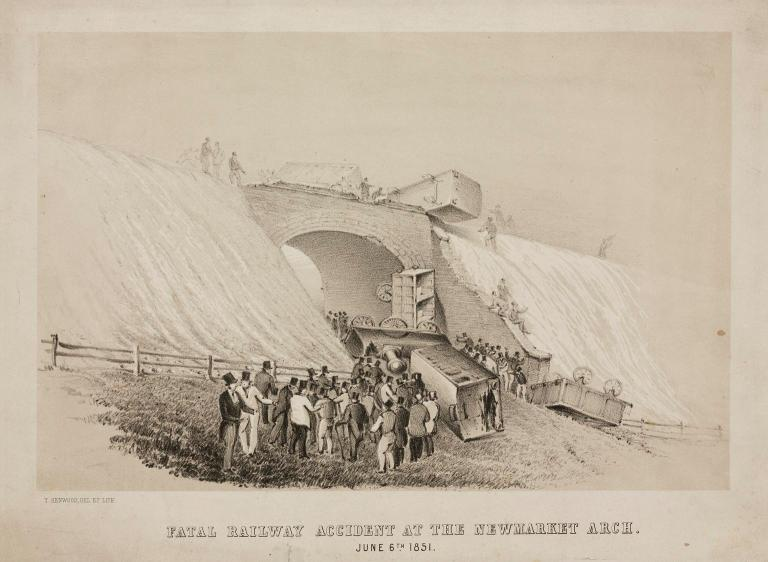
- Engraving of the accident

Details
- Date: 6 June 1851; 12:05 pm
- Location: Brighton and Hove, United Kingdom
- Coordinates: 50°51′51″N 0°2′35″W
- Line: Brighton, Lewes and Hastings Railway
- Incident type: Derailment
- Cause: Suspected sabotage, obstruction on rail, excessive speed

Statistics
- Trains: 1
- Vehicles: 4
- Passengers: 7
- Deaths: 5

The Brighton railway disaster was a train derailment that occurred in England in 1851 resulting in the deaths of three passengers and two crew members. The accident was initially speculated to be an act of sabotage carried out by a juvenile.

== Background ==
On Friday 6 June 1851, a four-coach train hauled by locomotive number 82 (a 2-2-2 tender locomotive built in 1847 by Sharp Brothers) was running tender first on the 12:05 pm service from Brighton. On this day, there were only five passengers, plus the fireman and driver. The train had just pulled into Falmer railway station, then departed heading eastward towards Lewes.

== Accident ==
As the No. 82 departed, it went down an incline reaching a speed of 27 miles per hour. Further down the line, a ten-year-old child identified as Jimmy Boakes was allegedly seen playing on the railway tracks. Eyewitness accounts said that the boy was playing with a wooden sleeper that was lying across the tracks and using it as a seesaw. When No. 82 reached the point where Boakes had allegedly been seen it struck the wooden sleeper causing the train to derail.

Upon derailing, the train and its carriages overturned into an embankment over a bridge known locally as The Newmarket Arch. Three passengers and both of the crew members died as a result of the accident. Accounts of the accident stated that the three passengers that had perished were in an open (i.e. roofless) carriage and died upon being ejected from the wreck. The fireman was instantly killed in the wreck; the driver managed to survive the accident, but was gravely injured later succumbing to his injuries. The only survivor in the open carriage was a male who ducked down underneath a seat as the carriages began to overturn. He managed to walk away from the disaster only with bruises.

== Investigation and inquiry ==
After rumours began to spread about Boakes causing the derailment, a £50 reward was offered to anyone who could provide his whereabouts in an effort to arrest him. Boakes was eventually questioned by the police about his role in the crash. According to Boakes' mother, Hannah, Jimmy and his younger brother had gone to the site where the accident would occur at 11:30am because he wanted to see the train as it passed. When further questioned about the obstruction on the tracks, an officer asked the boy if he had seen the wooden sleeper on the tracks. According to Jimmy, he had not seen the sleeper on the tracks, but rather near the tracks.

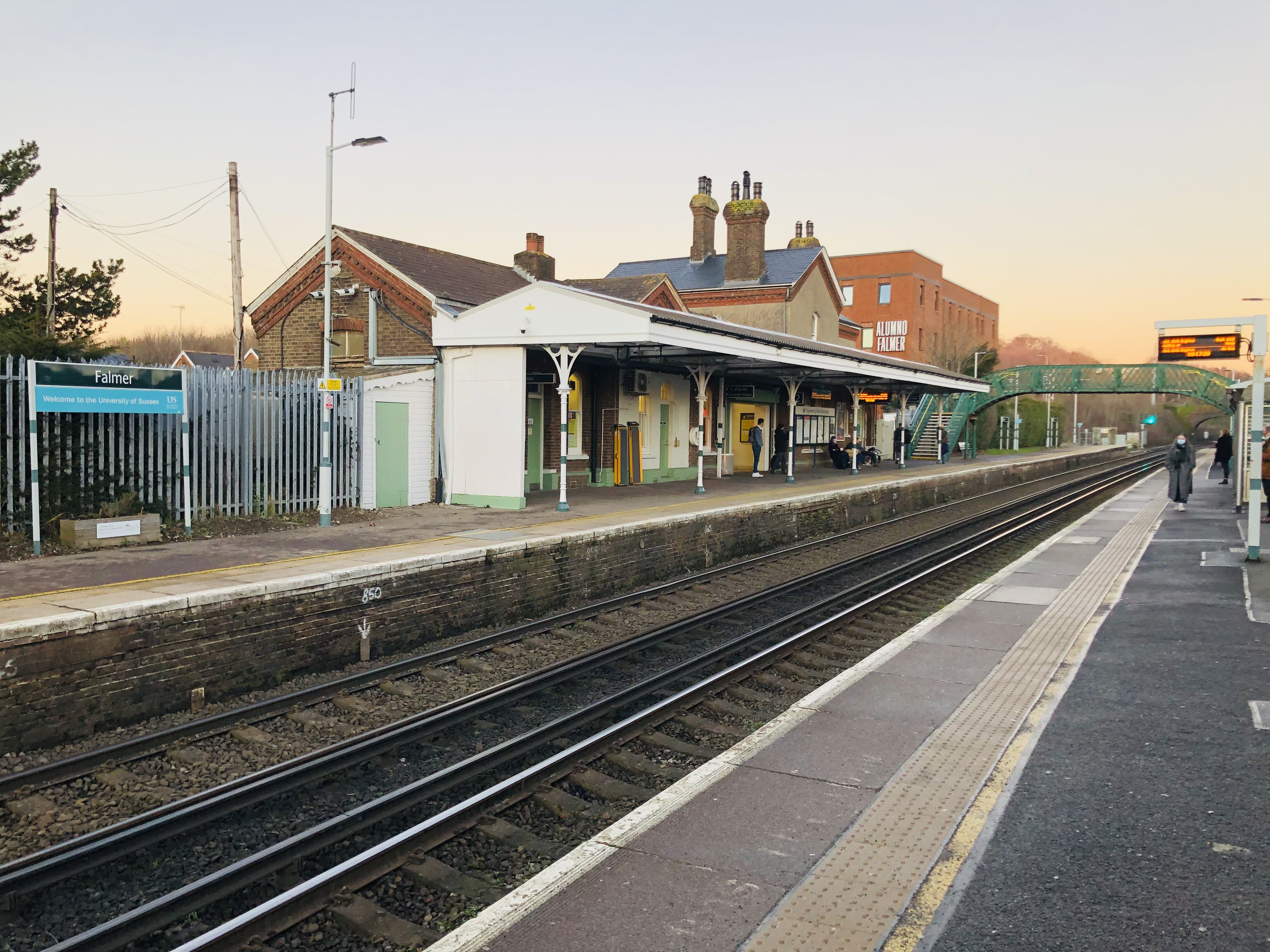
Falmer railway station, located near the site of the accident

After the local vicar’s attempt to get a confession out of Boakes proved futile, the case started to shift blame away from the child. Furthermore, doubts of Jimmy's role grew as the railway sleeper would have been too heavy for a boy his age to lift by himself. The case then changed, pointing responsibility to the driver for excessive speed, as well as blaming the manufacturer for not putting guard irons on the rear of the tender.

The charges against Boakes were eventually dropped. Some historians suspect that the sleeper had been left on the tracks by careless railway workers. A year to the day after the accident, and at the same location, Jimmy Boakes was struck by lightning and killed.
