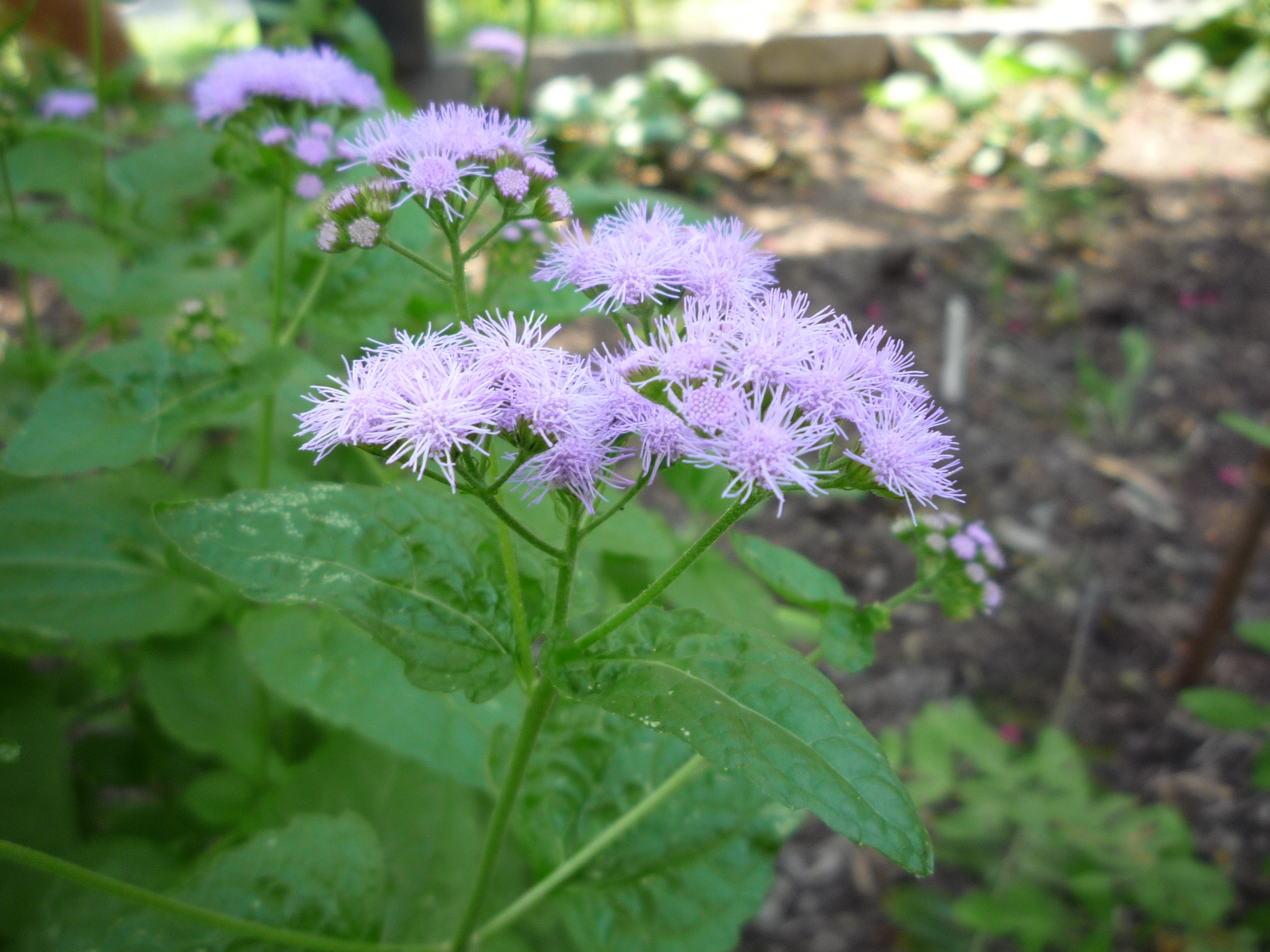
- Conoclinium coelestinum

Scientific classification
- Kingdom: Plantae
- Clade: Tracheophytes
- Clade: Angiosperms
- Clade: Eudicots
- Clade: Asterids
- Order: Asterales
- Family: Asteraceae
- Subfamily: Asteroideae
- Tribe: Eupatorieae
- Genus: Conoclinium; DC.

Species
- Conoclinium betonicifolium; Conoclinium coelestinum; Conoclinium dissectum; Conoclinium mayfieldii

= Conoclinium =

Genus of flowering plants

Conoclinium, the mistflowers, is a genus of four species of herbaceous perennial flowering plants, native to North America. They are 0.5 to 2 metres (1.6 to 6.6 ft) tall, and have blue to purple or violet flowers (occasionally white).

The plants of this genus have sometimes been classified in the genus Eupatorium, but late 20th century research shows they are more closely related to other plants of the Eupatorieae, such as Ageratum.

The generic name is derived from the Greek words κῶνος (kônos), meaning "cone", and κλινίον (kliníon), meaning "little bed".

== Species ==
- Conoclinium betonicifolium is found in Texas, Mexico, Guatemala
- Conoclinium coelestinum (blue mistflower) is native to eastern and central North America, from Ontario south as far as Florida and Texas. It is often grown as a garden plant, although it does have a tendency to spread and take over a garden. It is recommended for habitat restoration (within its native range), especially in wet soils.
- Conoclinium dissectum (synonym C. greggii) is found in the southern United States and Mexico (Arizona, Tamaulipas, New Mexico, Texas, Chihuahua, Coahuila, Durango, Nuevo León, San Luis Potosí, Sonora, Zacatecas).
- Conoclinium mayfieldii is found in northern Mexico (Chihuahua, Durango, Tamaulipas)
