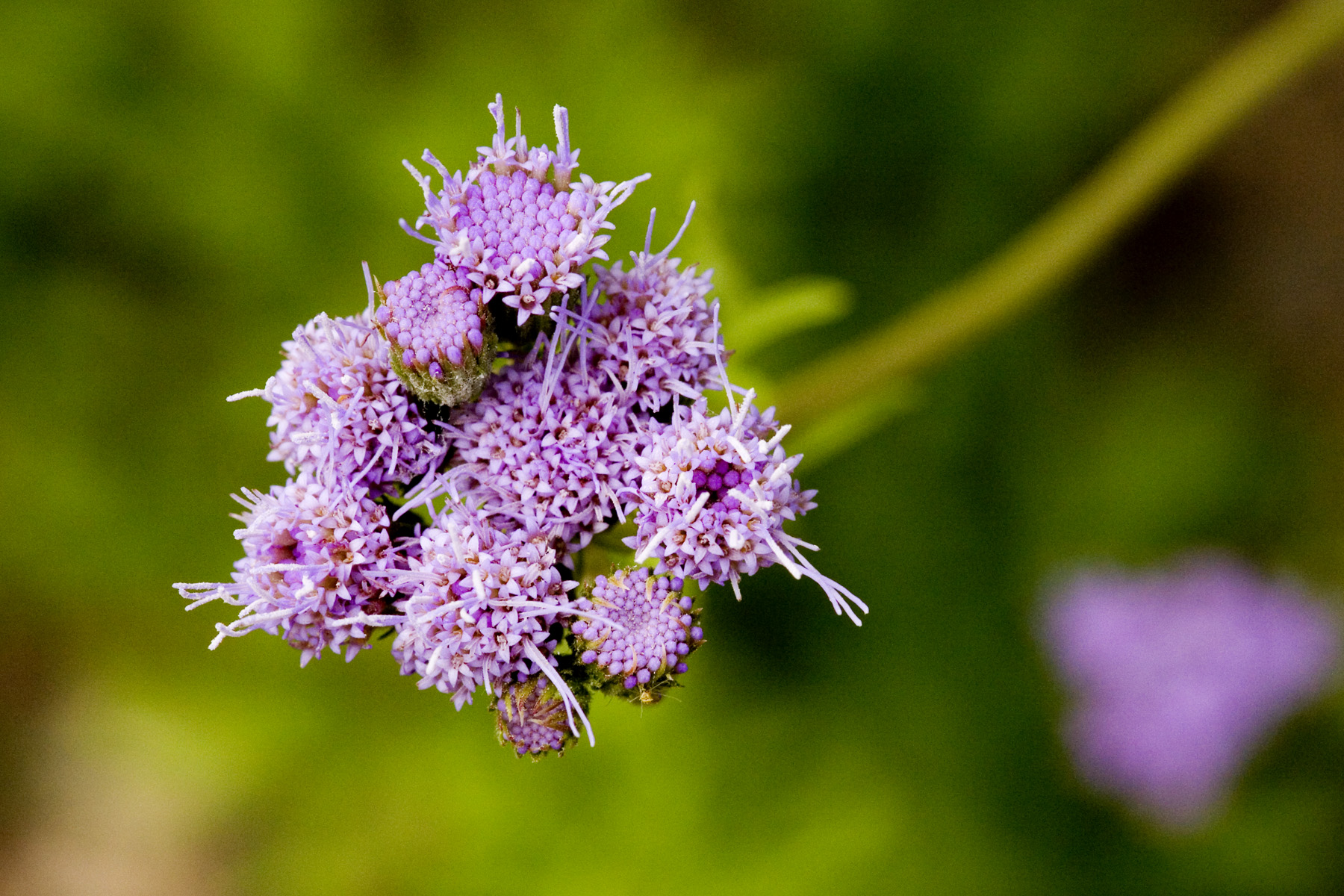

Scientific classification
- Kingdom: Plantae
- Clade: Tracheophytes
- Clade: Angiosperms
- Clade: Eudicots
- Clade: Asterids
- Order: Asterales
- Family: Asteraceae
- Genus: Conoclinium
- Species: C. dissectum

Binomial name
- Conoclinium dissectum A.Gray

Synonyms
- Conoclinium greggii (A.Gray) Small; Eupatorium greggii A.Gray

= Conoclinium dissectum =

Species of flowering plant

Conoclinium dissectum, the palm-leaf mistflower or palmleaf thoroughwort, is a North American species of flowering plants in the family Asteraceae. It is native to northern Mexico (Tamaulipas, Chihuahua, Coahuila, Durango, Nuevo León, San Luis Potosí, Sonora, Zacatecas) and the southwestern United States (Arizona, Texas, New Mexico).

Conoclinium dissectum is a perennial often forming tight clumps. One plant generally produces several flower heads, each with lavender or purple disc florets but no ray florets.
