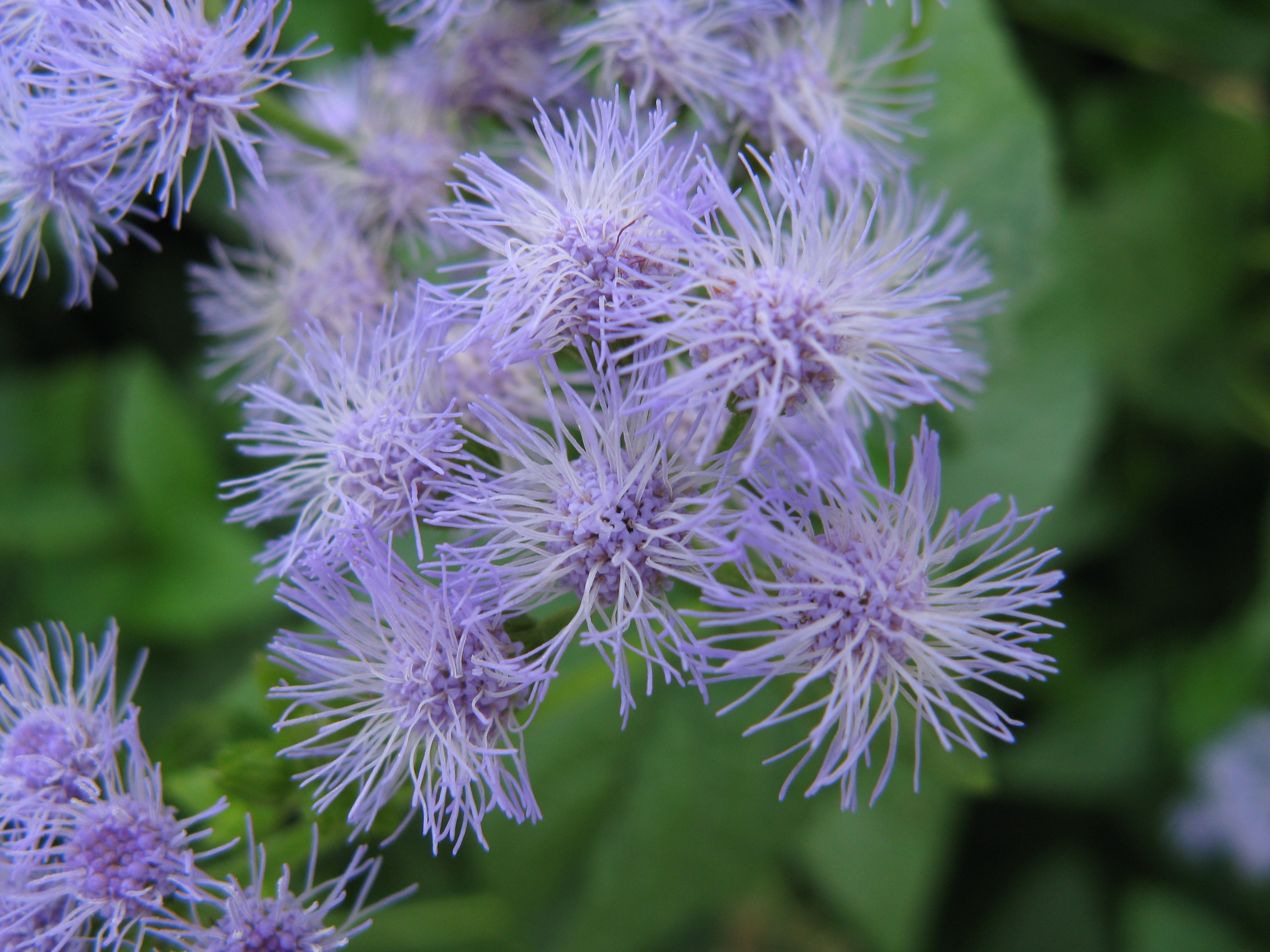

Conservation status
- Secure (NatureServe)

Scientific classification
- Kingdom: Plantae
- Clade: Embryophytes
- Clade: Tracheophytes
- Clade: Angiosperms
- Clade: Eudicots
- Clade: Asterids
- Order: Asterales
- Family: Asteraceae
- Genus: Conoclinium
- Species: C. coelestinum

Binomial name
- Conoclinium coelestinum (L.) DC.

Synonyms
- Synonymy: Conoclinium dichotomum Chapm.; Conoclinium flaccidum Greene; Conoclinium nepetaefolium Greene; Conoclinium nepetifolium Greene; Conoclinium venulosum Greene; Eupatorium coelestinum L.; Eupatorium deltoideum Steudel; Eupatorium violaceum Raf.

= Conoclinium coelestinum =

Species of flowering plant

Conoclinium coelestinum, commonly known as blue mistflower, mistflower, wild ageratum, or blue boneset, is a North American species of herbaceous perennial flowering plant in the family Asteraceae. It was formerly classified in the genus Eupatorium, but phylogenetic analyses in the late 20th century research indicated that that genus should be split, and the species was reclassified in Conoclinium.

== Description ==
Conoclinium coelestinum normally grows to a height of 30–76 cm (1–2.5 ft) with round, light green stems and a few or numerous branches. The leaves are opposite and ovate to triangular in shape with blunt teeth, measuring up to 8 cm (3 in) long and 5 cm (2 in) across.

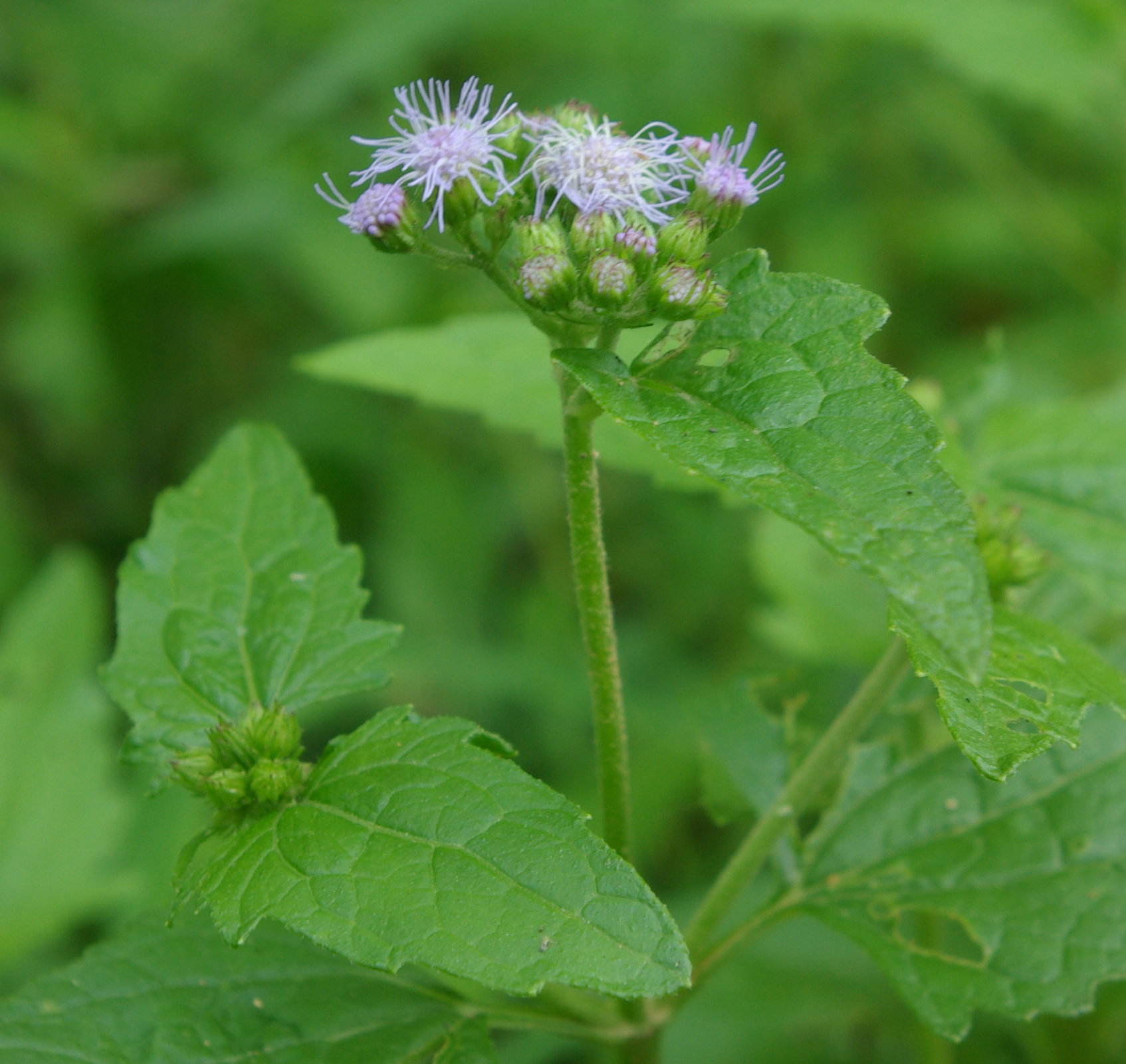
Blue mistflower in bloom in Arkansas

Flat-topped clusters, or panicles, of blue, purple, or lavender flowerheads, measuring 3–8 cm (1–3 in), are located at the end of the stems. Each flowerhead consists of about 40-50 disk florets with tiny tubular corollas that have 5 spreading lobes.

== Etymology ==
The genus Conoclinium is from the Greek word for "cone-bed". The specific epithet coelestinum is from the Latin for sky-blue or heavenly.

== Distribution and habitat ==
C. coelestinum is native to eastern and central North America, from Texas to the west, Illinois to the north, the east coast to the east, and Florida to the south. It has been introduced in New York, Michigan, and Ontario. This species prefers moist soils and can be found in wood edges, sandy woodlands and clearings, wet meadows and stream banks. It can thrive in a variety of light conditions ranging from shade to full sun.

== Ecology ==
The flowers bloom from July to November and are attractive to bees and butterflies.

This species can grow in areas that are subject to regular prescribed fire and can persist through repeated annual burning.

Conoclinium coelestinum is insect pollinated and is recorded to have been visited in northern Florida by Augochloropsis metallica, Megachile albitarsis. '

== Uses ==
Blue mistflower is often grown as a garden plant, although tends to spread and take over a garden. It is recommended for habitat restoration within its native range, especially in wet soils.
