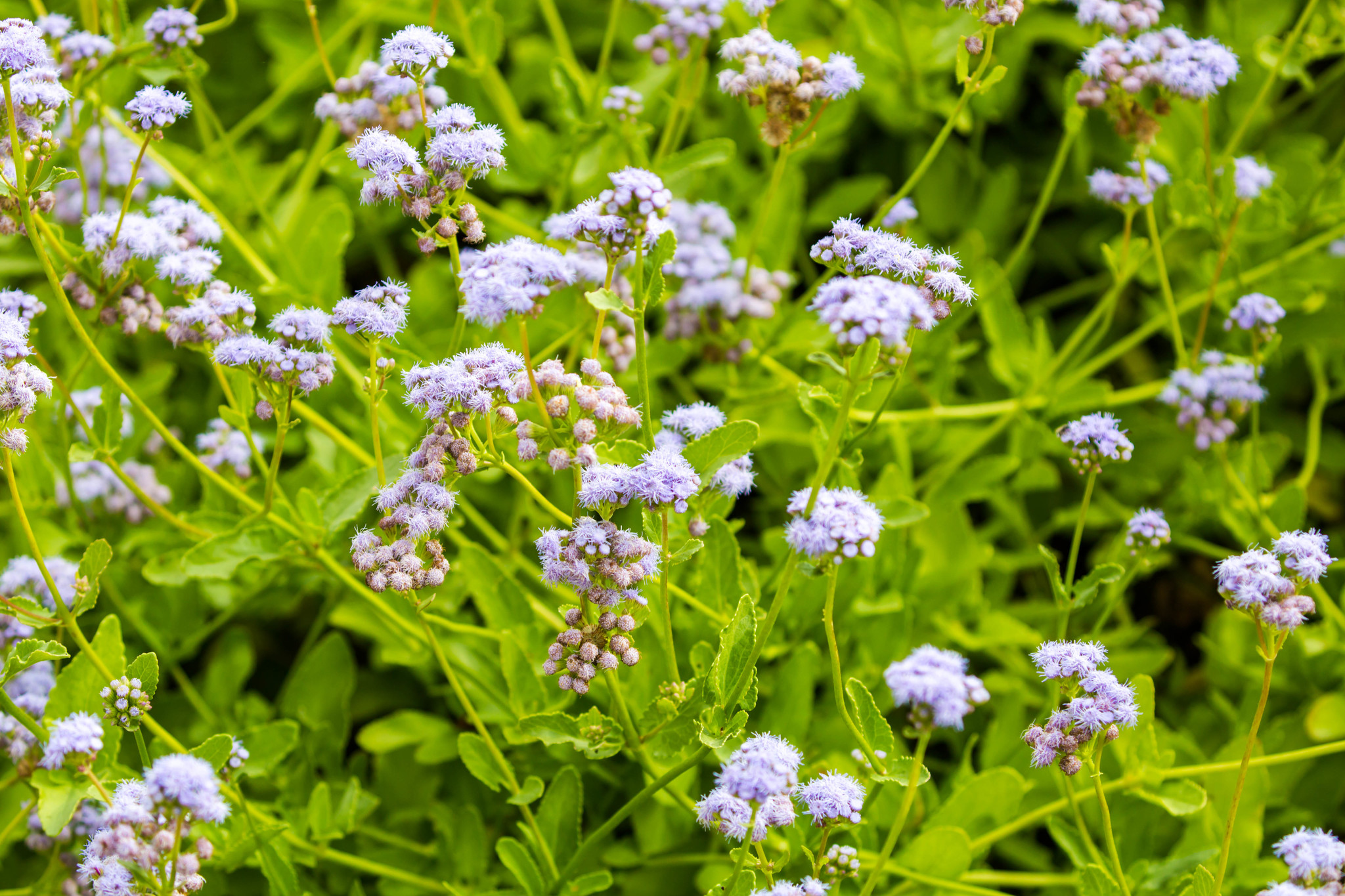

Scientific classification
- Kingdom: Plantae
- Clade: Tracheophytes
- Clade: Angiosperms
- Clade: Eudicots
- Clade: Asterids
- Order: Asterales
- Family: Asteraceae
- Genus: Conoclinium
- Species: C. betonicifolium

Binomial name
- Conoclinium betonicifolium (Mill.) R.M. King & H. Rob.

Synonyms
- Conoclinium betonicaefolium (Mill.) R.M. King & H. Rob; Caelestina hartwegii (Benth.) Walp.; Conoclinium betonicum DC.; Conoclinium integrifolium (A.Gray) Small; Conoclinium oligolepis Kunze; Eupatorium betonicaefolium Mill.; Eupatorium betonicifolium Mill.; Eupatorium betonicum Hemsley; Eupatorium conoclinium Mill. ex B.L.Turner; Eupatorium hartwegii Benth.; Eupatorium oligolepis (Kunze) Hemsl.

= Conoclinium betonicifolium =

Species of flowering plant

Conoclinium betonicifolium, the betony-leaf mistflower or betonyleaf thoroughwort, is a North American species of flowering plants in the family Asteraceae. It is widespread across much of Mexico from Chihuahua to Quintana Roo, and has also been found in Texas and Guatemala.

Conoclinium betonicifolium is a perennial with a stem that runs close to the ground and sometimes roots at the nodes. One plant generally produces several flower heads, each with blue or purple disc florets but no ray florets.
