= O. floribunda =

O. floribunda may refer to:

- Ocotea floribunda, a plant with lauroid leaves
- Olearia floribunda, an Australian plant
- Ouratea floribunda, a wild plane
