= Olearia cassiniae =

Scientific classification
- Kingdom: Plantae
- Clade: Tracheophytes
- Clade: Angiosperms
- Clade: Eudicots
- Clade: Asterids
- Order: Asterales
- Family: Asteraceae
- Genus: Olearia
- Species: O. cassiniae

Binomial name
- Olearia cassiniae (F.Muell.) F.Muell. ex Benth.

Synonyms
- Aster cassiniae F.Muell.; Olearia cassiniae F.Muell. nom. inval., pro syn.

Species of shrub

Olearia cassiniae is a species of flowering plant in the family Asteraceae and is endemic to the south-west of Western Australia. It is an erect or spreading shrub that typically grows to a height of 0.7–1.8 m (2 ft 4 in – 5 ft 11 in) and produces white daisy-like inflorescences, mostly between February and April. The species was first formally described in 1865 by Ferdinand von Mueller who gave it the name Aster cassiniae in Fragmenta Phytographiae Australiae from specimens collected by George Maxwell. In 1867, George Bentham changed the name to Olearia cassiniae in Flora Australiensis. The specific epithet (cassiniae) is a reference to the genus Cassinia.

This olearia grows on sand dunes or in wetlands in the Esperance Plains, Jarrah Forest and Warren biogeographic regions of south-western Western Australia. It is listed as "not threatened" by the Government of Western Australia Department of Biodiversity, Conservation and Attractions.
