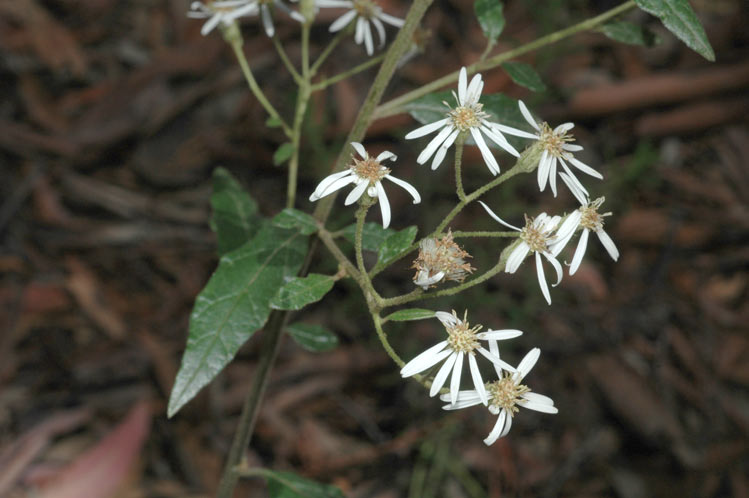
- In the Australian National Botanic Gardens

Scientific classification
- Kingdom: Plantae
- Clade: Tracheophytes
- Clade: Angiosperms
- Clade: Eudicots
- Clade: Asterids
- Order: Asterales
- Family: Asteraceae
- Genus: Olearia
- Species: O. nernstii

Binomial name
- Olearia nernstii (F.Muell.) F.Muell. ex Benth.

Synonyms
- Aster nernstii F.Muell.; Olearia nernstii F.Muell. nom. inval., pro syn.

= Olearia nernstii =

Species of shrub

Olearia nernstii is a species of flowering plant in the family Asteraceae and is endemic to eastern Australia. It is a shrub with scattered egg-shaped to elliptic leaves with toothed or prickly edges, and white and yellow, daisy-like inflorescences.

== Description ==
Olearia nernstii is a shrub that typically grows to a height of up to 2 m (6 ft 7 in). Its leaves are arranged alternately but scattered, egg-shaped to elliptic, 20–110 mm (0.79–4.33 in) long and 8–35 mm (0.31–1.38 in) wide with toothed or prickly edges. The lower surface of the leaves is covered with woolly brown hairs. The heads or daisy-like "flowers" are arranged in loose groups on the ends of branches on a peduncle up to 35 mm (1.4 in) long. Each head is 14–29 mm (0.55–1.14 in) wide with nine to twenty white ray florets surrounding fifteen to forty yellow disc florets. Flowering occurs from July to November and the fruit is a more or less glabrous achene, the pappus with 29 to 45 bristles.

== Taxonomy ==
This daisy bush was first formally described in 1865 by Ferdinand von Mueller, who gave it the name Aster nernstii in Fragmenta Phytographiae Australiae from specimens he collected near Moreton Bay. In 1867, George Bentham changed the name to Olearia nernstii in Flora Australiensis.

In the Fragmenta, Mueller refers to a collection made by Nerst near Ipswich. The Public Place Names Act 1989 of the Australian Capital Territory, refers to Nernst Place named after "Joseph Nernst c. 1832–1878) botanical collector".

== Distribution and habitat ==
Olearia nernstii grows in forest or woodland in coastal areas and nearby ranges of south-eastern Queensland to near Gosford and as far inland as Torrington in New South Wales.
