= Olearia hookeri =

Scientific classification
- Kingdom: Plantae
- Clade: Tracheophytes
- Clade: Angiosperms
- Clade: Eudicots
- Clade: Asterids
- Order: Asterales
- Family: Asteraceae
- Genus: Olearia
- Species: O. hookeri

Binomial name
- Olearia hookeri (Sond.) Benth.

Synonyms
- Eurybia hookeri Sond.; Olearia hookeri (Sond.) Benth. var. hookeri

Species of flowering plant

Olearia hookeri, commonly known as crimsontip daisybush, is a species of flowering plant in the family Asteraceae and is endemic to Tasmania. It is a sticky shrub with small, narrowly linear leaves and white to bluish-purple and yellow, daisy-like inflorescences.

== Description ==
Olearia hookeri is a sticky, glabrous shrub that typically grows to a height of up to 2 m (6 ft 7 in). Its leaves are narrowly linear, 3–5 mm (0.12–0.20 in) long. The heads or daisy-like "flowers" are arranged singly on the ends of branchlets and are 20–25 mm (0.79–0.98 in) in diameter. Each head has eight to ten white to bluish-purple ray florets surrounding a slightly larger number of yellow disc florets. Flowering occurs from September to December and the fruit is a short, hairy achene, the pappus with bristles of different lengths.

== Taxonomy ==
The species was formally described in 1853 by Otto Wilhelm Sonder who gave it the name Eurybia hookeri in Linnaea: ein Journal für die Botanik in ihrem ganzen Umfange, oder Beiträge zur Pflanzenkunde, based on plant material collected by Charles Stuart. In 1867, George Bentham changed the name to Olearia hookeri in Flora Australiensis.

== Distribution and habitat ==
Olearia hookeri grows on dry hills near Hobart and in shrubby woodland on the south and central-east coasts of Tasmania.

== Conservation status ==
This daisy bush is listed as "rare" under the Tasmanian Government Threatened Species Protection Act 1995.
