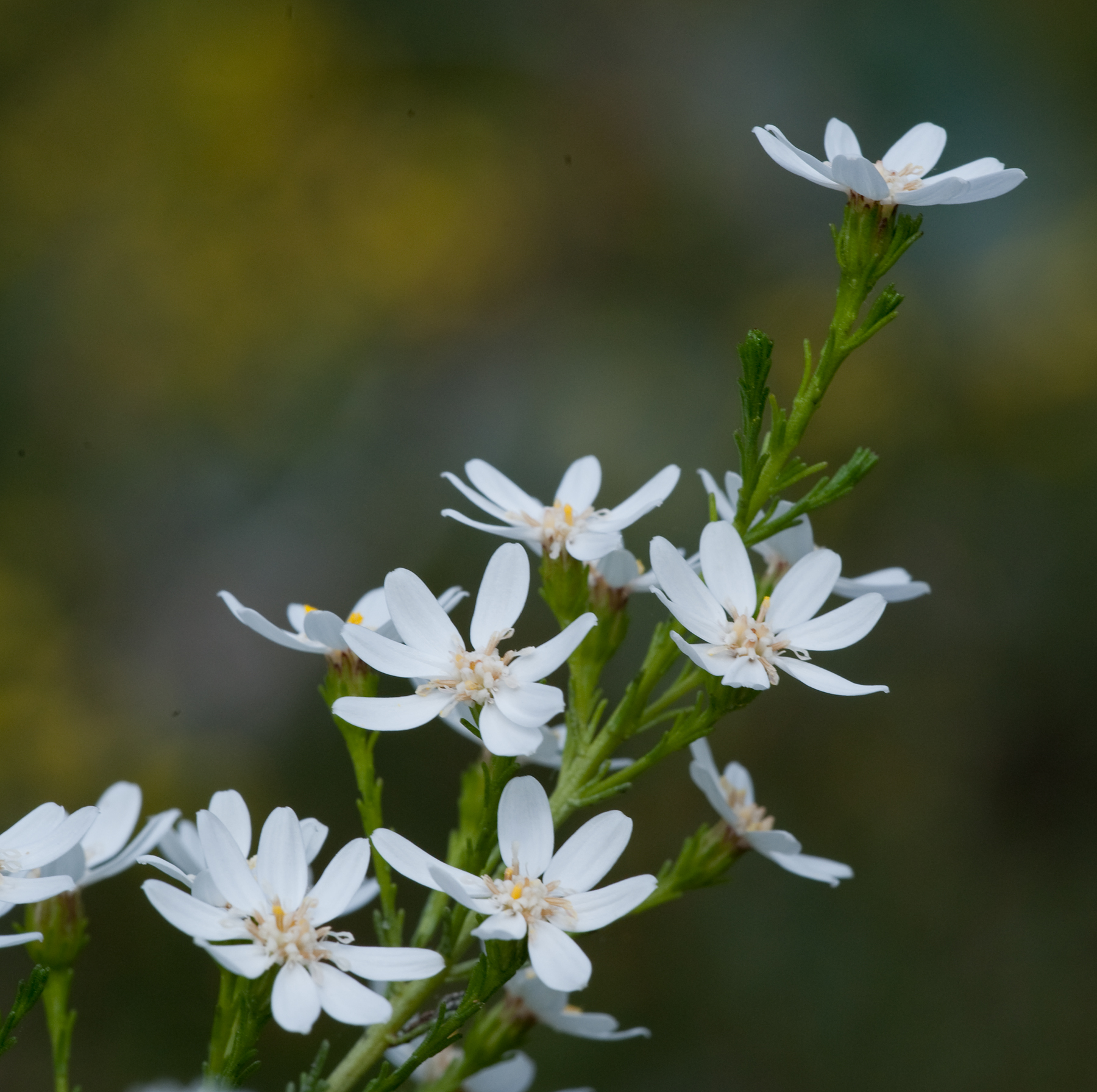

Scientific classification
- Kingdom: Plantae
- Clade: Tracheophytes
- Clade: Angiosperms
- Clade: Eudicots
- Clade: Asterids
- Order: Asterales
- Family: Asteraceae
- Genus: Olearia
- Species: O. teretifolia

Binomial name
- Olearia teretifolia (Sond.) Benth.

Synonyms
- Aster teretifolius (Sond.) F.Muell.; Aster teretifolius var. callitriformis F.Muell.; Aster teretifolius (Sond.) F.Muell. var. teretifolius; Eurybia teretifolia Sond.; Olearia teretifolia F.Muell. nom. inval., pro syn.

= Olearia teretifolia =

Species of plant

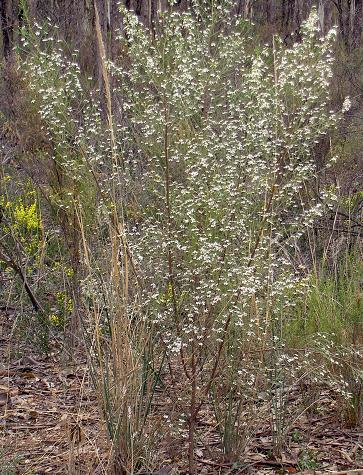
Habit near Muckleford, Victoria

Olearia teretifolia, commonly known as cypress daisy-bush, is a species of flowering plant in the family Asteraceae and is endemic to south-eastern continental Australia. It is a slender, erect to spreading shrub with more or less sessile, linear leaves pressed against the stem, and white and yellow, daisy-like inflorescences.

== Description ==
Olearia teretifolia is a slender, erect to spreading shrub that typically grows to a height of up to about 1.5 m (4 ft 11 in) and has glabrous, sticky branchlets and leaves. The leaves are arranged alternately, more or less sessile, 2–5 mm (0.079–0.197 in) long, about 0.5 mm (0.020 in) wide and usually pressed against the stem. The heads or daisy-like "flowers" are arranged singly on the ends of branches, often in large numbers, each head sessile and 10–16 mm (0.39–0.63 in) in diameter with an urn-shaped involucre 3–4 mm (0.12–0.16 in) long at the base. Each head has 4 to 10 white ray florets, the ligule 3.5–6 mm (0.14–0.24 in) long, surrounding 5 to 10 yellow disc florets. Flowering occurs from August to November and the fruit is a ribbed achene 1.0–1.5 mm (0.039–0.059 in) long, the pappus 2–3 mm (0.079–0.118 in) long.

== Taxonomy ==
This daisy was first formally described in 1853 by Otto Wilhelm Sonder who gave it the name Eurybia tertifolia in the journal Linnaea, based on plant material collected from the Mount Lofty Ranges. It was renamed firstly as Aster teretifolius in 1865 by Victorian Government Botanist Ferdinand von Mueller in Fragmenta Phytographiae Australiae and finally in 1867 by George Bentham as Olearia teretifolia in Flora Australiensis. The specific epithet (teretifolia) means "terete-leaved".

== Distribution and habitat ==
Olearia teretifolia grows in forest, mallee and scrub in disjunct areas of Victoria and in the south-east of South Australia.
