= Olearia curticoma =

Scientific classification
- Kingdom: Plantae
- Clade: Tracheophytes
- Clade: Angiosperms
- Clade: Eudicots
- Clade: Asterids
- Order: Asterales
- Family: Asteraceae
- Genus: Olearia
- Species: O. curticoma

Binomial name
- Olearia curticoma N.G.Walsh

Species of shrub

Olearia curticoma is a species of flowering plant in the family Asteraceae and is endemic to Victoria. It is an erect shrub with glabrous, sticky branchlets, linear leaves and white and yellow, daisy-like inflorescences.

== Description ==
Olearia curticoma is an erect shrub that typically grows to a height of up to about 3.5 m (11 ft), and has glabrous, sticky branchlets. The leaves are arranged alternately along the branchlets, linear, 11–22 mm (0.43–0.87 in) long and 0.8–1.5 mm (0.031–0.059 in) wide and more or less glabrous. The heads or daisy-like "flowers" are arranged singly at or near the ends of branchlets and are 18–25 mm (0.71–0.98 in) in diameter on a peduncle 8–25 mm (0.31–0.98 in) long. Each head has ten to sixteen ray florets, the ligule white and 98–12 mm (3.86–0.47 in) long, surrounding about twice as many yellow disc florets. Flowering occurs from December to May and the fruit is a cylindrical achene, the pappus short and white.

== Taxonomy and naming ==
Olearia curticoma was first formally described in 2014 by Neville Grant Walsh in the journal Muelleria from specimens he collected in the Mitchell River National Park.

== Distribution and habitat ==
This daisy bush grows in dry forest and is only known from a small population above the Mitchell River at the type location in eastern Victoria.

== Conservation status ==
Olearia curticoma is listed as "critically endangered" under the Victorian Government Flora and Fauna Guarantee Act 1988.
