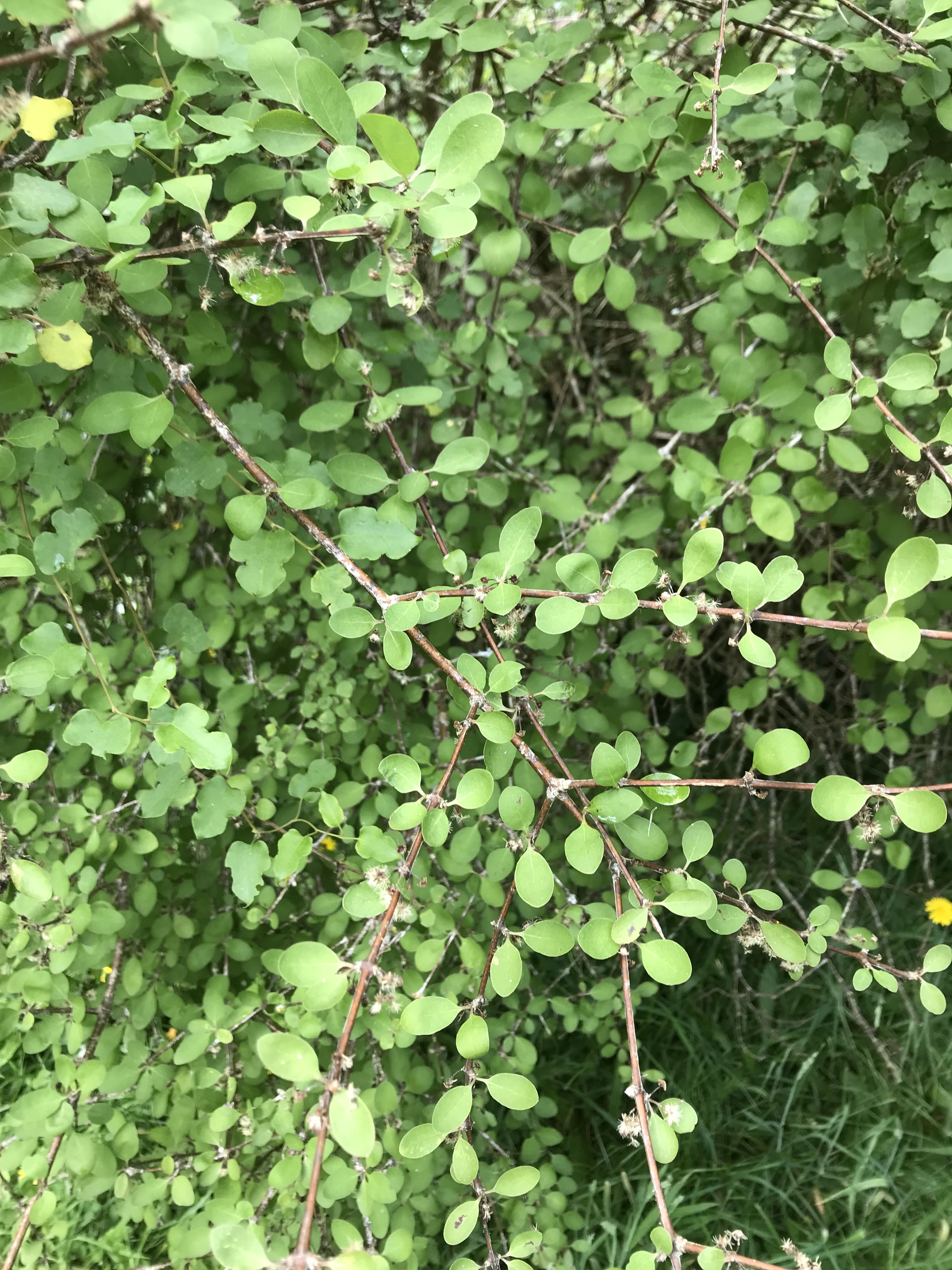

Conservation status
- Nationally Endangered (NZ TCS)

Scientific classification
- Kingdom: Plantae
- Clade: Tracheophytes
- Clade: Angiosperms
- Clade: Eudicots
- Clade: Asterids
- Order: Asterales
- Family: Asteraceae
- Genus: Olearia
- Species: O. gardneri

Binomial name
- Olearia gardneri Heads

= Olearia gardneri =

Species of tree endemic to New Zealand

Olearia gardneri, commonly known as Gardner's tree daisy, is a species of flowering plant in the family Asteraceae. It is found only in New Zealand. At one point it was ranked as New Zealand's rarest tree, with only 160 wild individuals known.
