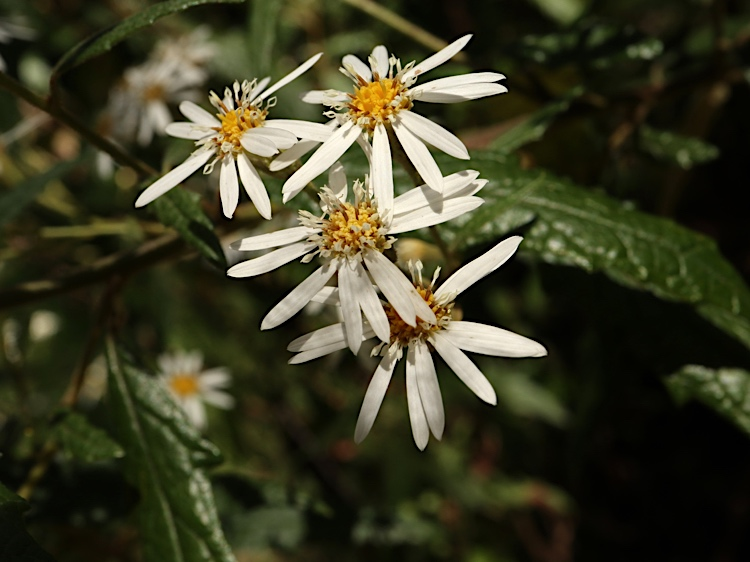
- In the Australian National Botanic Gardens

Scientific classification
- Kingdom: Plantae
- Clade: Tracheophytes
- Clade: Angiosperms
- Clade: Eudicots
- Clade: Asterids
- Order: Asterales
- Family: Asteraceae
- Genus: Olearia
- Species: O. gravis

Binomial name
- Olearia gravis (F.Muell.) Benth.

Synonyms
- Aster gravis F.Muell.; Olearia gravis F.Muell. nom. inval., pro syn.

= Olearia gravis =

Species of plant

Olearia gravis is a species of flowering plant in the family Asteraceae and is endemic to south-eastern Australia. It is a shrub with elliptic or egg-shaped leaves and white and yellow, daisy-like inflorescences.

== Description ==
Olearia gravis is a shrub that typically grows to a height of up to 1.6 m (5 ft 3 in). Its leaves are arranged alternately along the branchlets, elliptic or egg-shaped, 15–48 mm (0.59–1.89 in) long and 5–15 mm (0.20–0.59 in) wide on a petiole up to 10 mm (0.39 in) long and with small point along the edges. The heads or daisy-like "flowers" are arranged singly on the ends of branches, and are 27–39 mm (1.1–1.5 in) in diameter on a peduncle up to 65 mm (2.6 in) long. Each head has 20 to 22 white ray florets surrounding 17 to 49 yellow disc florets. Flowering occurs from August to November and the fruit is a glabrous achene, the pappus with 31 to 39 bristles.

== Taxonomy ==
This daisy-bush was first formally described in 1865 by Ferdinand von Mueller who gave it the name Aster gravis in his Fragmenta Phytographiae Australiae from specimens collected near Tenterfield. In 1867, George Bentham changed the name to Olearia glandulosa in Flora Australiensis. The specific epithet (gravis) means "heavy" or "weighty".

== Distribution and habitat ==
Olearia gravis grows in forest in mountain areas from south-east Queensland to the Blue Mountains in New South Wales.
