= Olearia arida =

Conservation status
- Priority Four — Rare Taxa (DEC)

Scientific classification
- Kingdom: Plantae
- Clade: Tracheophytes
- Clade: Angiosperms
- Clade: Eudicots
- Clade: Asterids
- Order: Asterales
- Family: Asteraceae
- Genus: Olearia
- Species: O. arida

Binomial name
- Olearia arida E.Pritz.

Species of shrub

Olearia arida is a species of flowering plant in the family Asteraceae and is endemic to inland western Australia. It is upright shrub with spreading branches and clusters of white flowers.

== Description ==
Olearia arida is an upright shrub with a single woody stem or a spreading habit 0.3–2 m (0.98–6.6 ft) high covered densely with flattened short soft matted hairs. The sessile leaves are long and narrow 7–20 mm (0.28–0.79 in) long and 1–2.5 mm (0.039–0.098 in) wide, broadening to a rounded apex. The upper-side of leaves are smooth and sticky, the under-side a woolly white with an obvious mid-vein with a rolled edge and glands. The cluster of 10-15 white flowers are on a short stem in leaf axils. The flower bracts are arranged in 3 rows, bell-shaped, smooth, pale, sticky, often purplish and broader at the apex and about 5 mm (0.20 in) long. The flower centre is yellow, blooms appear from July to September. The smooth, dry one-seeded needle-shaped fruit are about 2 mm (0.079 in) long with fine longitudinal lines.

== Taxonomy and naming ==
Olearia arida was described in 1918 by Ernst Pritzel and published in Repertorium Specierum Novarum Regni Vegetabilis. The specific epithet (arida) is derived from the Latin word aridus meaning "dry".

== Distribution and habitat ==
This species grows on sand hills in the Coolgardie, Great Victoria Desert and Murchison biogeographic regions of Western Australia, in the far north-west of South Australia and the far south-west of the Northern Territory.

== Conservation status ==
This daisy is listed as "Priority Four" in Western Australia, by the Government of Western Australia Department of Biodiversity, Conservation and Attractions, meaning that it is rare or near threatened.
