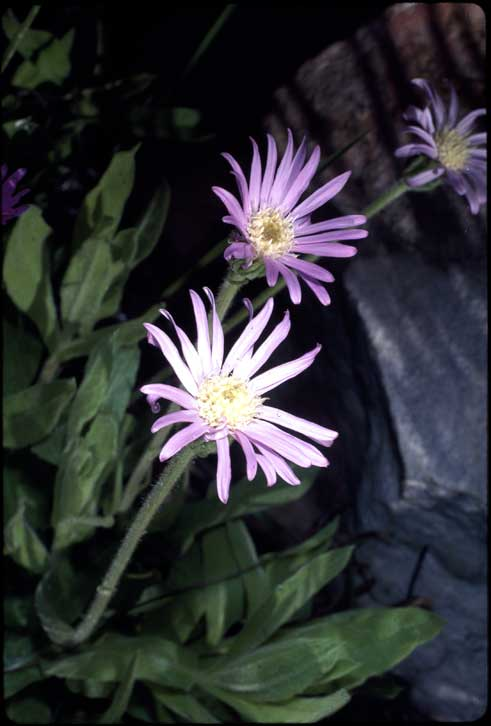

Scientific classification
- Kingdom: Plantae
- Clade: Tracheophytes
- Clade: Angiosperms
- Clade: Eudicots
- Clade: Asterids
- Order: Asterales
- Family: Asteraceae
- Genus: Olearia
- Species: O. arguta

Binomial name
- Olearia arguta Benth.

Synonyms
- Aster argutus Benth. nom. inval., pro syn.; Shawia arguta (Benth.) Britten

= Olearia arguta =

Species of shrub

Olearia arguta is a species of flowering plant in the family Asteraceae and is endemic to northern Australia. It is an erect, hairy aromatic herb that typically grows to a height of up to 1 m (3 ft 3 in) and has oblong leaves, sometimes with a few pointed teeth near the end and produces white, blue, purple or pink daisy-like inflorescences. It was first formally described in 1867 by George Bentham from specimens collected on an island in the Gulf of Carpentaria by Robert Brown. The specific epithet (arguta) means "sharply-toothed".

Bentham also described two subspecies and the names are accepted by the Australian Plant Census:

- Olearia arguta Benth. var. arguta
- Olearia arguta var. lanata Benth.

Olearia arguta occurs in the Kimberley region of Western Australia, the Top End of the Northern Territory and in north Queensland. It is listed as "not threatened" by the Department of Biodiversity, Conservation and Attractions, and as of "least concern" under the Northern Territory Territory Parks and Wildlife Conservation Act 1976.
