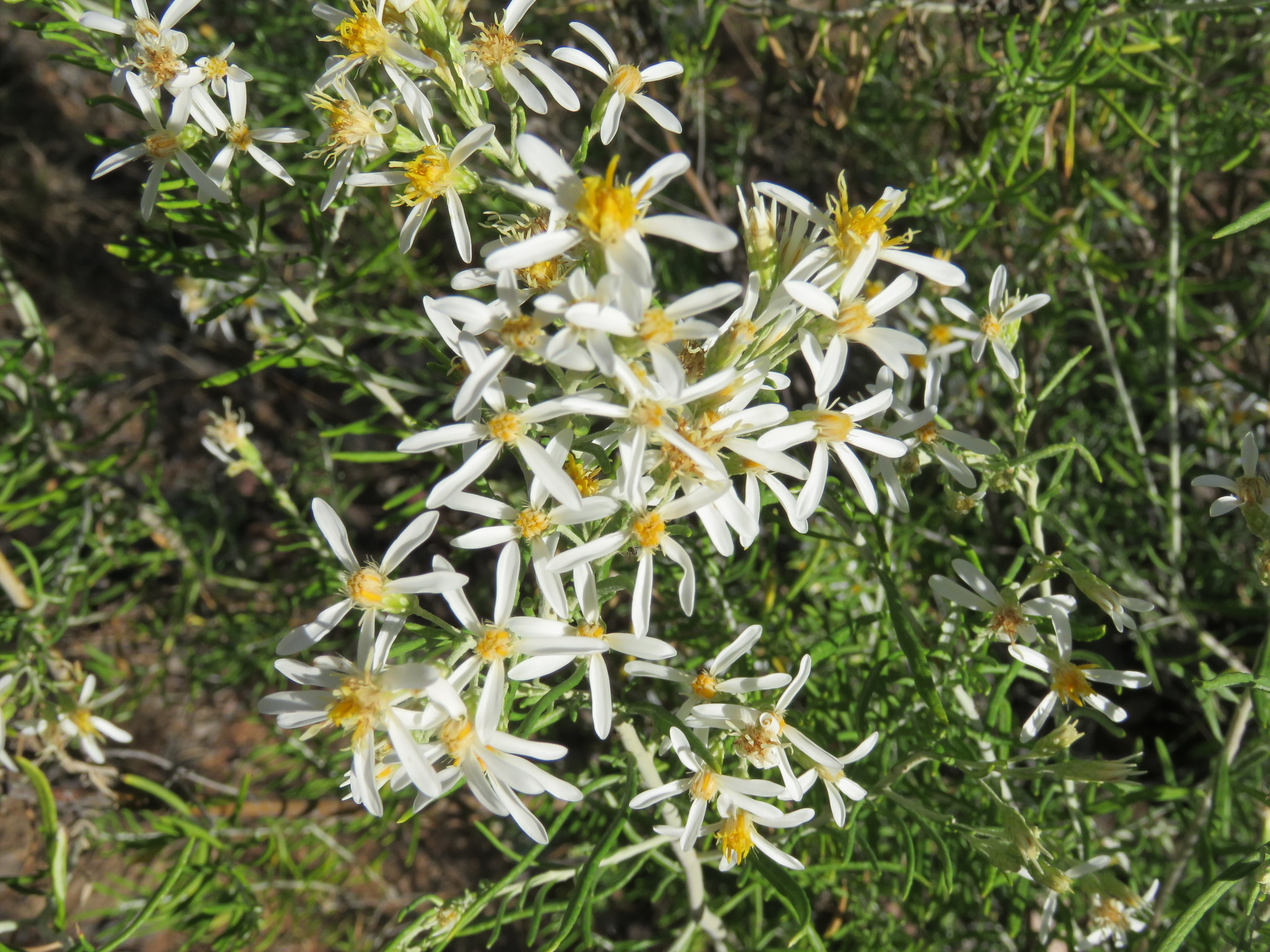
- Near Hobartville, Queensland

Scientific classification
- Kingdom: Plantae
- Clade: Embryophytes
- Clade: Tracheophytes
- Clade: Angiosperms
- Clade: Eudicots
- Clade: Asterids
- Order: Asterales
- Family: Asteraceae
- Genus: Olearia
- Species: O. subspicata

Binomial name
- Olearia subspicata (Hook.) Benth.

Synonyms
- Aster mitchelli F.Muell. orth. var.; Aster mitchellii F.Muell.; Eurybia subspicata Hook.; Olearia sp. Bremer Bay (R.Davis 10528) WA Herbarium; Olearia subspicata F.Muell. nom. inval., pro syn.

= Olearia subspicata =

Species of flowering plant

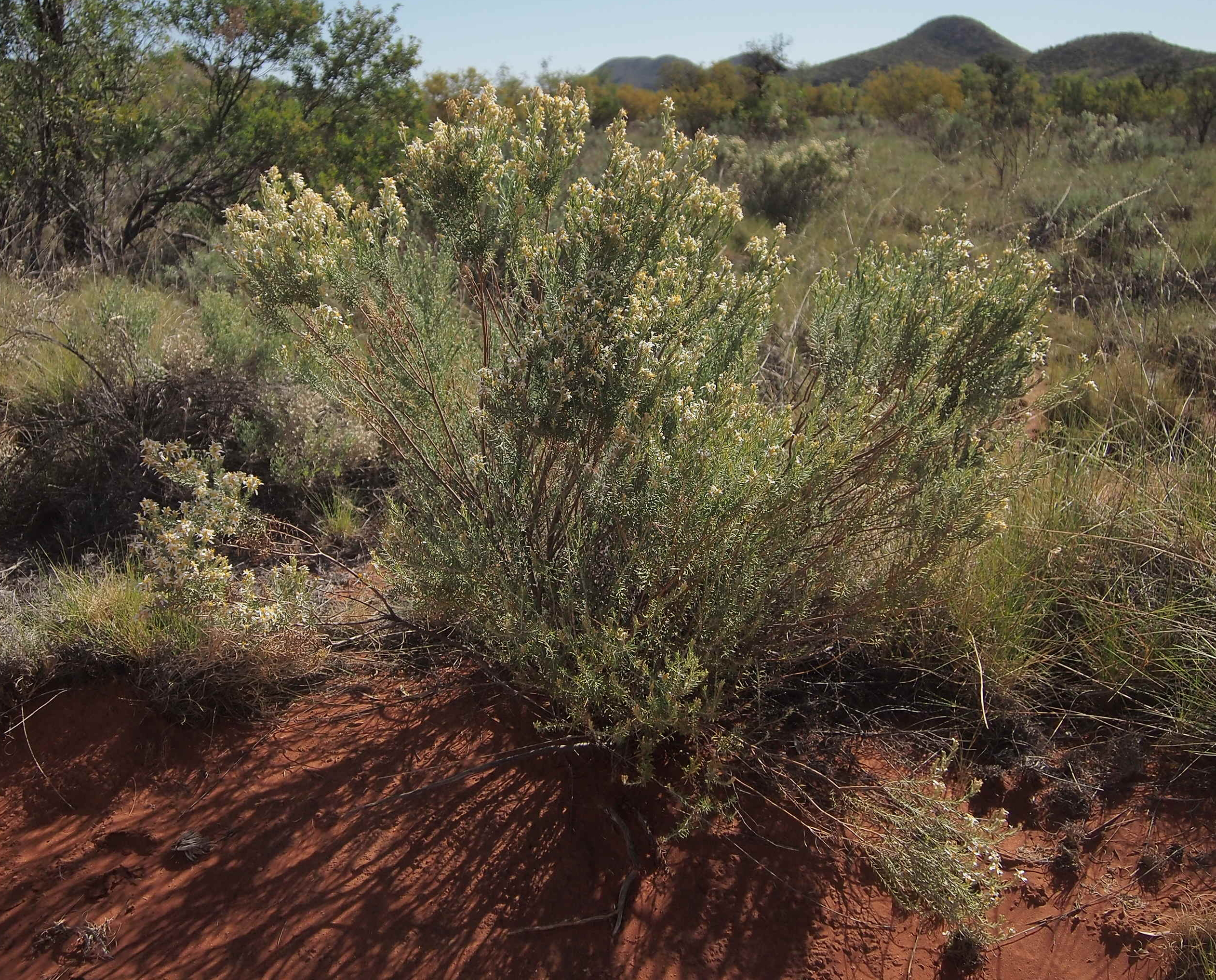
Habit

Olearia subspicata, commonly known as spiked daisy bush or shrubby daisy-bush, is a species of flowering plant in the family Asteraceae and is endemic to continental Australia. It is an erect shrub with more or less linear leaves and white and yellow, daisy-like inflorescences.

== Description ==
Olearia subspicata is an erect shrub that typically grows to a height of 0.5–3 m (1 ft 8 in – 9 ft 10 in)and has woody stems. The leaves are linear to narrowly elliptic, or narrowly egg-shaped or narrowly lance-shaped with the narrower end towards the base, 5–30 mm (0.20–1.18 in) long and 1–3 mm (0.039–0.118 in) wide and sessile. The edges of the leaves are rolled under, the upper surface is more or less glabrous and the lower surface, when visible, is woolly-hairy. The heads or daisy-like "flowers" are arranged singly or in panicles on the ends of branches or in leaf axils on a peduncle about 9 mm (0.35 in) long and are 14–20 mm (0.55–0.79 in) in diameter with a narrowly conical involucre at the base. Each head has up to 7, (usually 2 to 4) ray florets, the ligule 5–13 mm (0.20–0.51 in) long, surrounding 3 to 10 yellow disc florets. Flowering time varies with distribution and the fruit is an achene 1.5–2 mm (0.059–0.079 in) long, the pappus 5–8 mm (0.20–0.31 in) long with 40 to 50 white to straw-coloured bristles 5–6 mm (0.20–0.24 in) long.

== Taxonomy ==
This daisy was first formally described in 1845 by William Jackson Hooker who gave it the name Eurybia subspicata in Thomas Mitchell's Journal of an Expedition into the Interior of Tropical Australia. In 1867 George Bentham changed the name to Olearia subspicata in Flora Australiensis. The specific epithet (subspicata) means "almost spicate".

== Distribution and habitat ==
Spiked daisy bush grows in shrubland, mallee and mulga and is widely distributed in Western Australia, South Australia, the southern parts of the Northern Territory, western New South Wales, Queensland and the far north-west of Victoria.
