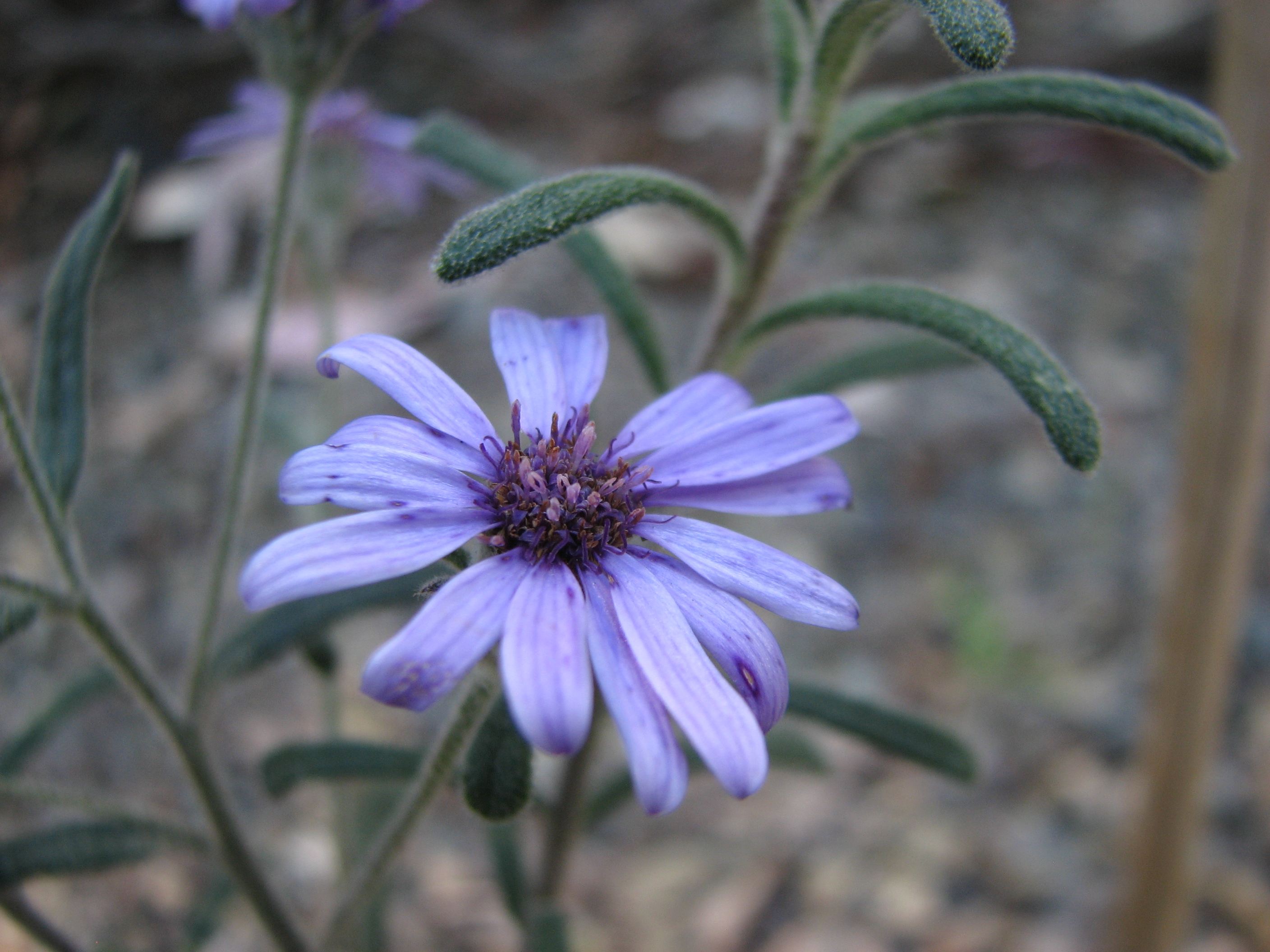
- Olearia asterotricha in Maranoa Gardens

Scientific classification
- Kingdom: Plantae
- Clade: Tracheophytes
- Clade: Angiosperms
- Clade: Eudicots
- Clade: Asterids
- Order: Asterales
- Family: Asteraceae
- Subfamily: Asteroideae
- Tribe: Astereae
- Subtribe: Brachyscominae
- Genus: Olearia; Moench

Type species
- Olearia tomentosa (J.C.Wendl.) DC.

Species
- See text

Synonyms
- Haxtonia Caley ex G.Don; Orestion Raf.; Steetzia Sond., nom. illeg.; Steiractis Raf.

= Olearia =

Genus of flowering plants

Olearia, most commonly known as daisy-bush, is a genus of flowering plants belonging to the family Asteraceae, the largest of the flowering plant families in the world. Olearia are found in Australia, New Guinea and New Zealand. The genus includes herbaceous plants, shrubs and small trees. The latter are unusual among the Asteraceae and are called tree daisies in New Zealand. All bear the familiar daisy-like composite flowerheads in white, pink, mauve or purple.

== Description ==
Plants in the genus Olearia are shrubs of varying sizes, characterised by a composite flower head arrangement with single-row ray florets enclosed by small overlapping bracts arranged in rows. The flower petals are more or less equal in length. The centre of the bi-sexual floret is disc shaped and may be white, yellowish or purplish, generally with 5 lobes. Flower heads may be single or clusters in leaf axils or at the apex of branchlets. Leaves may be smooth, glandular or with a sticky secretion. The leaves may grow opposite, alternate, arranged sparsely or clustered. Leaf margins either entire or lobed, with or without a stalk. The fruit are dry slightly compressed, one-seeded, narrow-elliptic or egg-shaped with longitudinal ridges and smooth or with sparse hairs.

== Taxonomy and naming ==
The genus Olearia was first described in 1802 by Conrad Moench in Supplementum ad Methodum Plantas and is named after Johann Gottfried Olearius, a 17th-century German scholar and author of Specimen Florae Hallensis. Originally a large genus, a molecular study has found it to be polyphyletic.

In 2020 Guy L. Nesom named ten new genera – Ephedrides, Eoglandula (later synonymised with the revived Spongotrichum), Landerolaria, Linealia, Muellerolaria, Neolaria, Phaseolaster, Vicinia, Walsholaria, and Wollemiaster – in which to place the 29 paraphyletic species previously in Olearia.

== Distribution ==
As of March 2026 Plants of the World Online accepts 135 species of Olearia in Australia, New Guinea, and New Zealand. PlantNET accepts approximately 180 species, of which about 130 species are endemic to Australia. Olearia are found in all states of Australia.

== Species ==
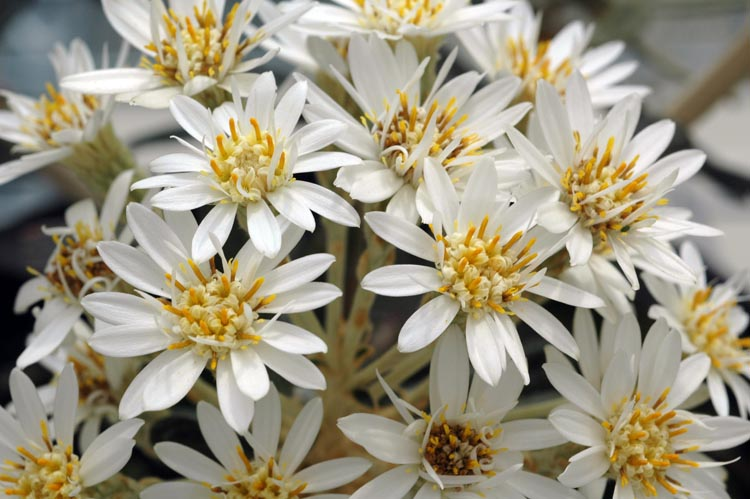
Olearia archeri

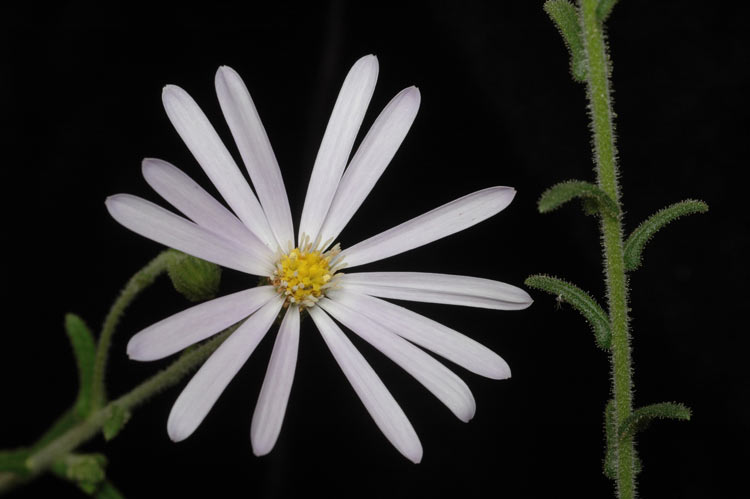
Olearia cordata

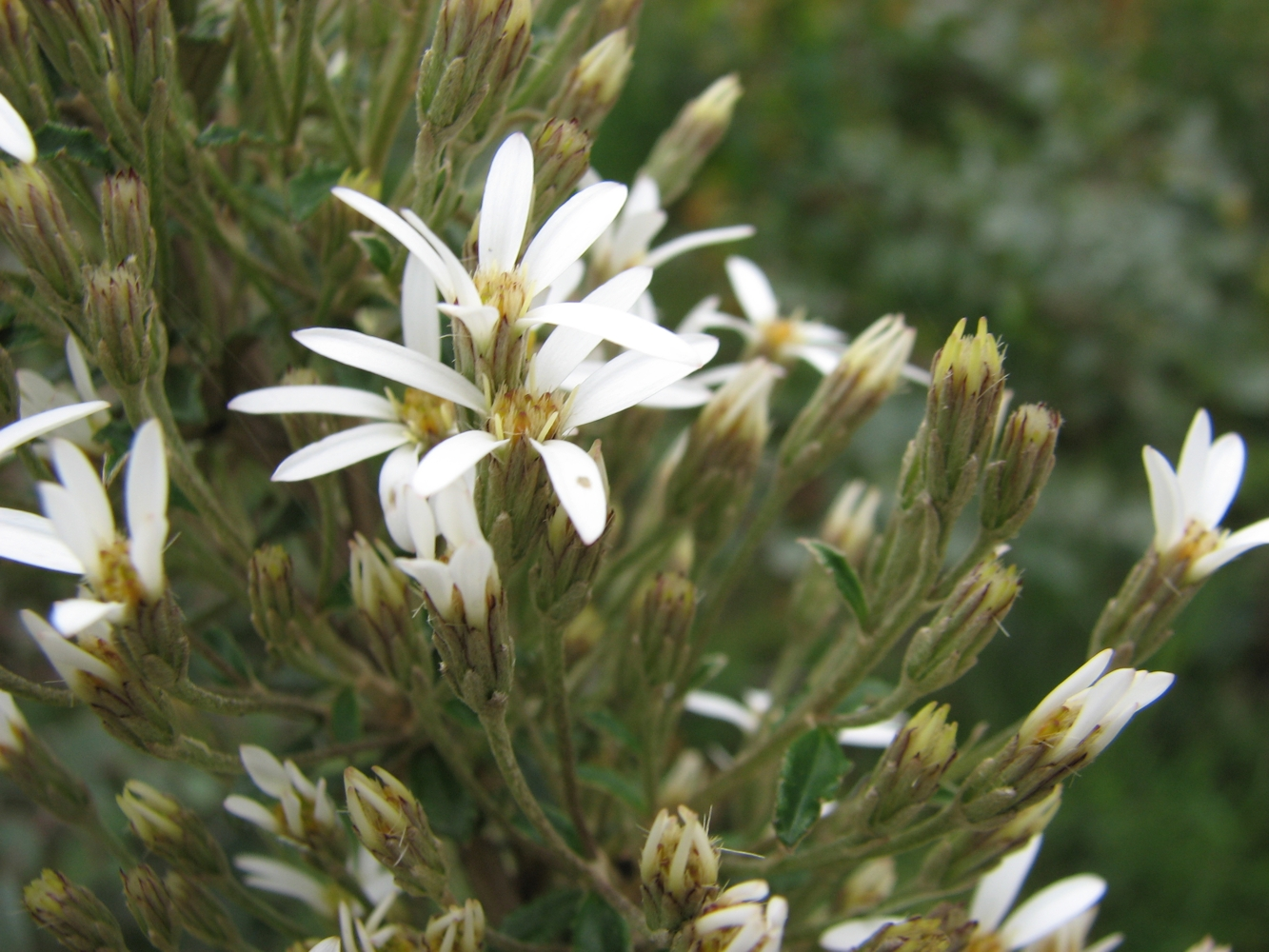
Olearia erubescens

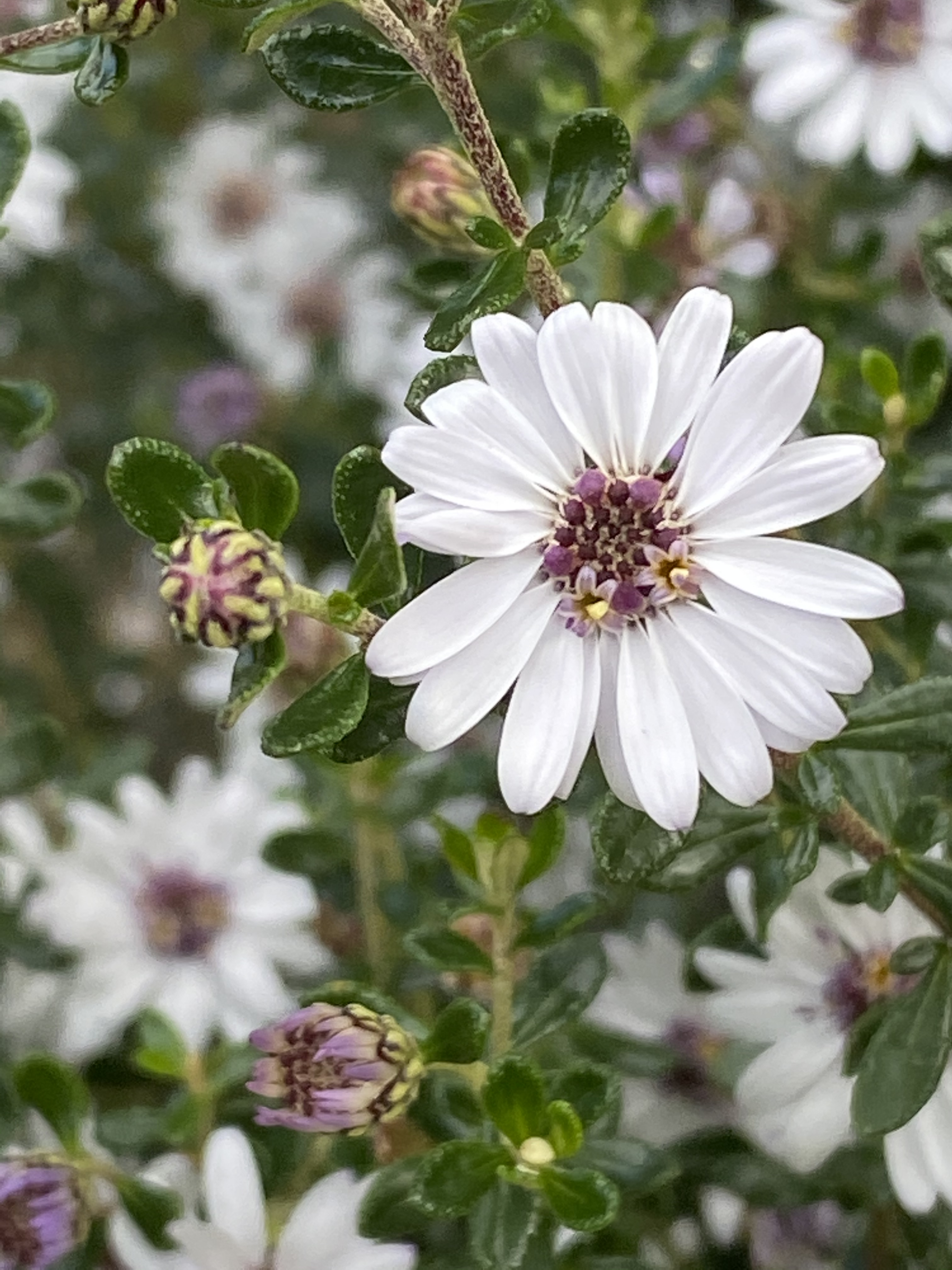
Olearia minor

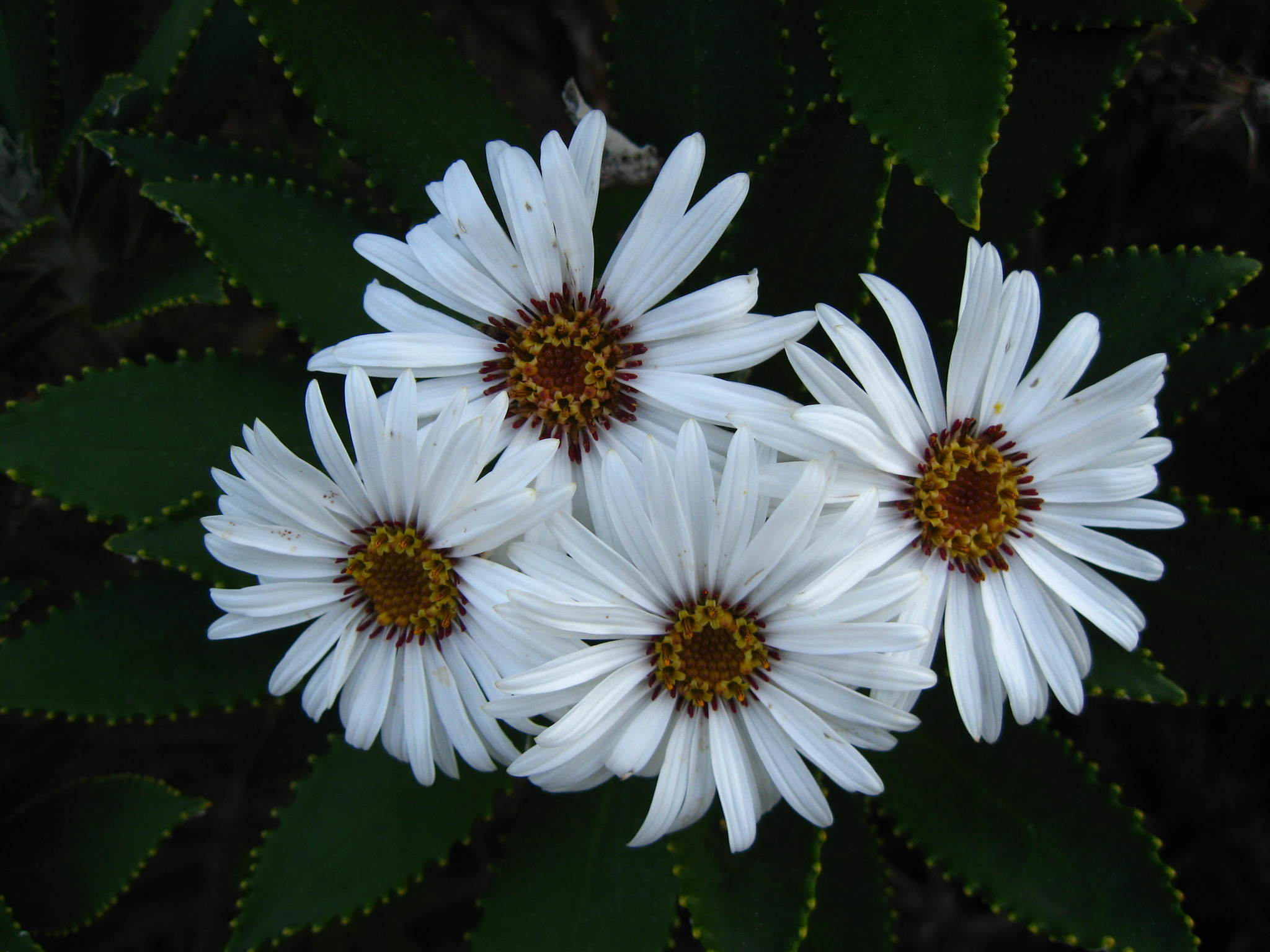
Olearia oporina

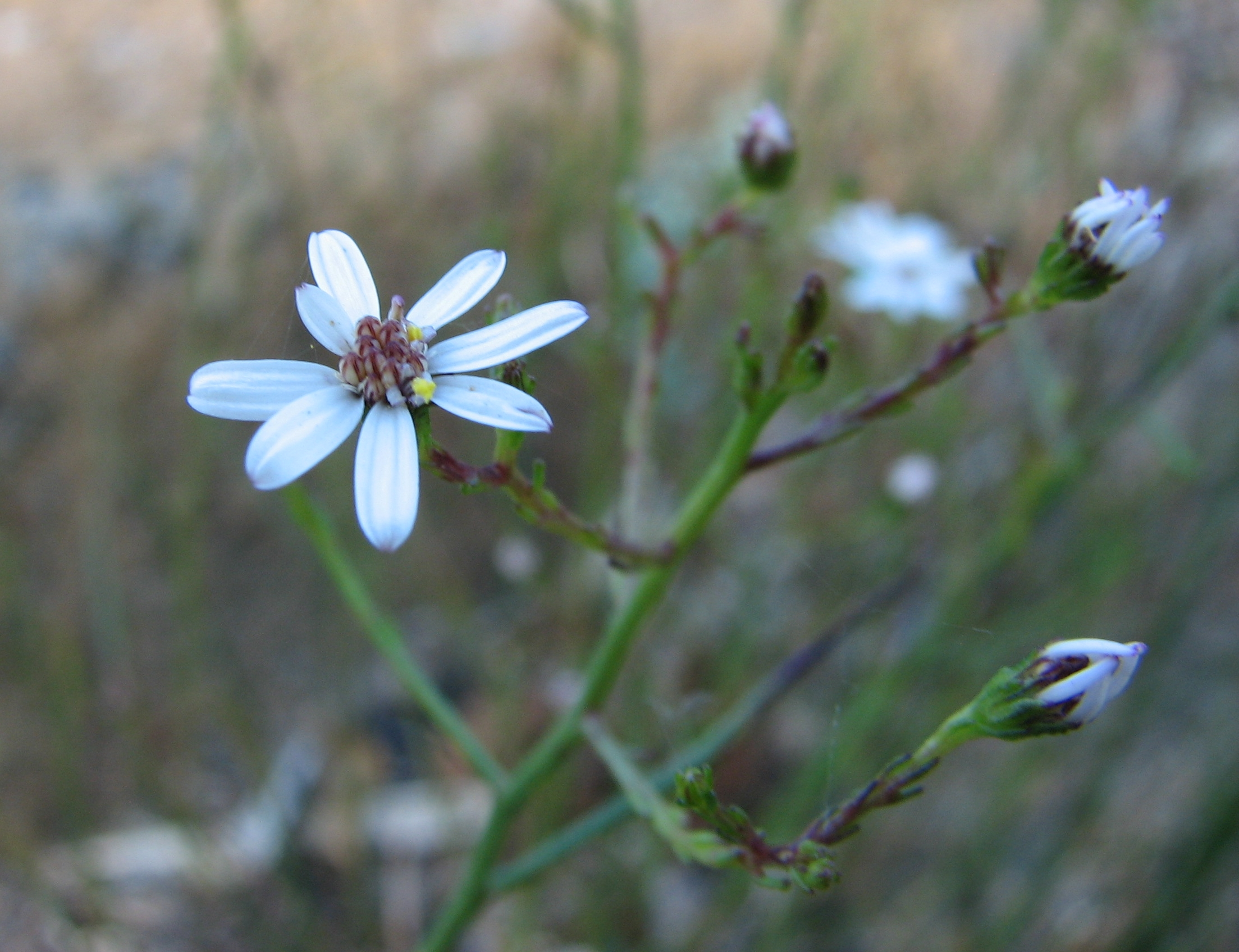
Olearia suffruticosa

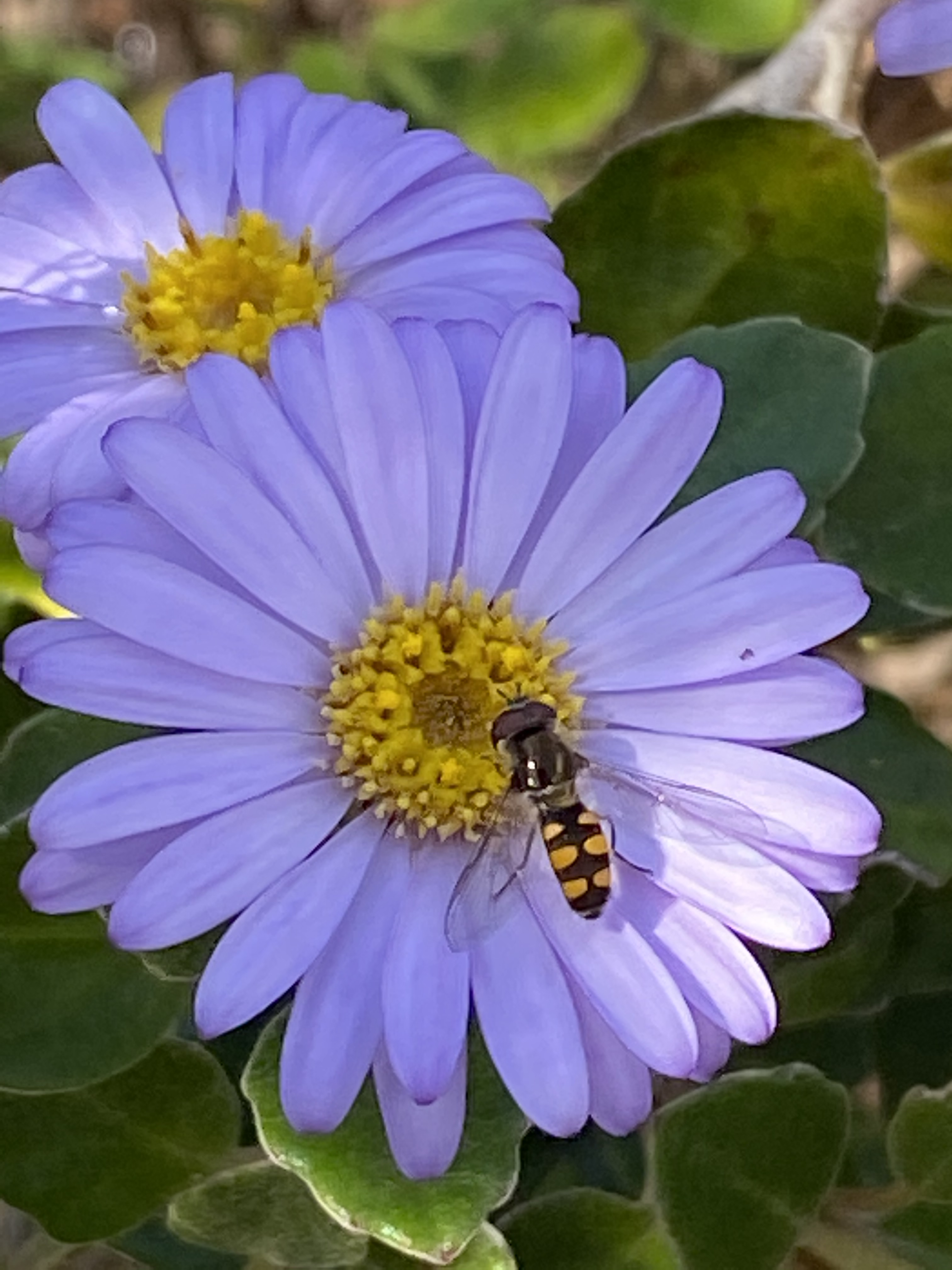
Olearia tomentosa

The following is a list of Olearia species accepted by the Plants of the World Online as of March 2026, Australian Plant Census or the New Zealand Plant Conservation Network or listed in the Census of Vascular Plants of Papua New Guinea as at May 2021:

- Olearia adenocarpa Molloy (N.Z.)
- Olearia adenolasia (F.Muell.) F.Muell. ex Benth. – woolly-glandular daisy-bush (W.A.)
- Olearia adenophora (F.Muell.) F.Muell. (Vic.)
- Olearia adpressa Hislop (W.A.)
- Olearia aglossa (Betche & Maiden) Lander (N.S.W., Vic.)
- Olearia algida N.A.Wakef. – alpine daisy-bush (N.S.W., A.C.T., Vic. Tas.)
- Olearia allomii Kirk – Great Barrier tree daisy (N.Z.)
- Olearia alpicola F.Muell. ex Benth. – alpine daisy-bush (N.S.W., Vic.)
- Olearia angulata (Kirk) Allan (N.Z.)
- Olearia archeri Lander (Tas.)
- Olearia arguta Benth. (W.A., N.T., Qld.)
  - Olearia arguta Benth. var. arguta (W.A., N.T.)
  - Olearia arguta var. lanata Benth. (W.A., N.T., Qld.)
- Olearia arida E.Pritz. (W.A., S.A., N.T.)
- Olearia asterotricha (F.Muell.) Benth. – rough daisy-bush (N.S.W., Vic.)
- Olearia astroloba Lander & N.G.Walsh – marble daisy-bush (Vic.)
- Olearia axillaris (DC.) F.Muell. ex Benth. – coast daisy-bush (W.A., S.A., N.S.W., Vic., Tas.)
- Olearia ballii (F.Muell.) Hemsl. – mountain daisy (Lord Howe Island)
- Olearia boorabbinensis Hochr. (W.A.)
- Olearia brachyphylla (F.Muell. ex Sond.) N.A.Wakef. (W.A., S.A.)
- Olearia brevipedunculata N.G.Walsh (N.S.W., Vic.)
- Olearia buchananii Kirk (North Island of N.Z.)
- Olearia bullata H.D.Wilson & Garn.-Jones (N.Z.)
- Olearia burgessii Lander (N.S.W.)
- Olearia canescens (Benth.) Hutch. (N.S.W., Qld.)
- Olearia capillaris Buchanan (N.Z.)
- Olearia cassiniae (F.Muell.) F.Muell. ex Benth. (W.A.)
- Olearia cheesmanii Cockayne & Allan – streamside tree daisy (N.Z.)
- Olearia cinerea Mattf. (New Guinea)
- Olearia clemensiae Mattf. (New Guinea)
- Olearia colensoi Hook.f. – tupare, leatherwood (N.Z.)
- Olearia coriacea Kirk (N.Z.)
- Olearia covenyi Lander (N.S.W.)
- Olearia crebra E.K.Cameron & Heenan (N.Z.)
- Olearia crenifingens Mattf. (New Guinea)
- Olearia crosby-smithiana Petrie (N.Z.)
- Olearia curticoma N.G.Walsh (Vic.)
- Olearia cymbifolia (Hook.f.) Cheeseman (N.Z.)
- Olearia decurrens (DC.) Benth. – clammy daisy-bush (W.A., S.A., N.S.W., Vic.)
- Olearia dibrachiata D.J.N.Hind & R.J.Johns – Western New Guinea
- Olearia durifolia J.Kost. (P.N.G.)
- Olearia elaeophila (A.Cunn. ex DC.) F.Muell. ex Benth. (W.A.)
- Olearia ericoides (Steetz) N.A.Wakef. (Tas.)
- Olearia excorticata Buchanan (northwestern South Island N.Z.)
- Olearia exiguifolia (F.Muell.) F.Muell. ex Benth. (W.A., S.A.)
- Olearia exilis S.Moore (New Guinea)
- Olearia fimbriata Heads (N.Z.)
- Olearia floccosa J.Kost. (P.N.G.)
- Olearia floribunda (Hook.f.) Benth. – heath daisy-bush (N.S.W., Vic., S.A.)
- Olearia fluvialis Lander (W.A.)
- Olearia fragrantissima Petrie (N.Z.)
- Olearia frostii (F.Muell.) J.H.Willis – Bogong daisy-bush (Vic.)
- Olearia gardneri Heads (N.Z.)
- Olearia glutinosa (Lindl.) Benth. – sticky daisy-bush (S.A., Vic. Tas.)
- Olearia grandiflora Hook. – Mount Lofty daisy-bush (S.A.)
- Olearia gravis (F.Muell.) F.Muell. ex Benth. (Qld., N.S.W.)
- Olearia × haastii Hook.f. – O. avicenniifolia × O. moschata (South Island N.Z.)
- Olearia hectorii Hook.f. (N.Z.)
- Olearia heloderma Albr. & I.Telford (N.S.W.)
- Olearia heterocarpa S.T.Blake – Nightcap daisy bush (Qld., N.S.W.)
- Olearia heterolepis Mattf. (P.N.G.)
- Olearia heterotricha Mattf. (P.N.G.)
- Olearia homolepis (F.Muell.) Benth. (W.A.)
- Olearia hooglandii J.Kost. (P.N.G.)
- Olearia hookeri (Sond.) Benth. (Tas.)
- Olearia hygrophila (DC.) Benth. (Qld.)
- Olearia ilicifolia Hook.f. – mountain holly (N.Z.)
- Olearia imbricata (Turcz.) Benth. – imbricate daisy bush (W.A.)
- Olearia incana (D.A.Cooke) Lander (W.A., S.A., Vic., N.S.W.)
- Olearia incondita Lander (W.A.)
- Olearia iodochroa (F.Muell.) Benth. – violet daisy-bush (N.S.W., Vic.)
- Olearia kernotii F.Muell. (P.N.G.)
- Olearia lacunosa Buchanan – lancewood tree daisy (N.Z.)
- Olearia lanata J.Kost (P.N.G.)
- Olearia lanuginosa (J.H.Willis) N.A.Wakef. – woolly daisy bush (W.A., S.A., Vic.)
- Olearia lasiophylla Lander (N.S.W.)
- Olearia laxiflora Kirk (N.Z.)
- Olearia lehmanniana (Steetz) Lander (W.A.)
- Olearia lepidophylla (Pers.) Benth. – club-moss daisy-bush (W.A., S.A., N.S.W., Vic., Tas.)
- Olearia lepidota Mattf. (P.N.G.)
- Olearia leptocephala J.Kost (P.N.G.)
- Olearia lineata (Kirk) Cockayne (N.Z.)
- Olearia lirata (Sims) Hutch. – snowy daisy-bush (N.S.W., A.C.T., Vic., Tas.)
- Olearia × macrodonta Baker – O. arborescens × O. ilicifolia (N.Z.)
- Olearia × matthewsii P.Heenan – O. ilicifolia × O. moschata (South Island N.Z.)
- Olearia megalophylla (F.Muell.) F.Muell. ex Benth. – large-leaf daisy-bush (N.S.W., A.C.T., Vic.)
- Olearia microdisca J.M.Black (S.A.)
- Olearia microphylla (Vent.) Maiden & Betche – small-leaf daisy-bush (Qld., N.S.W., A.C.T.)
- Olearia minor (Benth.) Lander (N.S.W., Vic., S.A., W.A.)
- Olearia × mollis (Kirk) Cockayne – Olearia ilicifolia × O. lacunosa (N.Z.)
- Olearia montana Lander (N.S.W.)
- Olearia monticola F.M.Bailey (P.N.G.)
- Olearia mooneyi (F.Muell.) Hemsl. (L.H.I)
- Olearia moschata Hook.f. (N.Z.)
- Olearia muricata (Steetz) Benth. – rough-leaved daisy bush (W.A.)
- Olearia nernstii (F.Muell.) F.Muell. ex Benth. (Qld., N.S.W.)
- Olearia obovata Mattf. (New Guinea)
- Olearia occidentissima Lander (W.A.)
- Olearia odorata Petrie – scented tree daisy (N.Z.)
- Olearia oleifolia Kirk (South Island N.Z.)
- Olearia oliganthema F.Muell. ex Benth. (N.S.W.)
- Olearia oppositifolia (F.Muell.) Lander (Qld., N.S.W.)
- Olearia pachycephala J.Kost (P.N.G.)
- Olearia pachyphylla Cheeseman (N.Z.)
- Olearia pallida J.Kost (P.N.G.)
- Olearia pannosa Hook. – velvet daisy-bush (S.A., Vic.)
- Olearia passerinoides (Turcz.) Benth. (W.A., S.A., N.S.W., Vic.)
- Olearia paucidentata (Steetz.) F.Muell. ex Benth. (W.A.)
- Olearia phlogopappa (Labill.) DC. – dusty daisy-bush, alpine daisy-bush (N.S.W., A.C.T., Vic., Tas.)
- Olearia pimeleoides (DC.) Benth. – pimelea daisy-bush (W.A., S.A., Qld., N.S.W., Vic.)
- Olearia platyphylla Mattf. (P.N.G.)
- Olearia plucheacea Lander (W.A.)
- Olearia polita H.D.Wilson & Garn.-Jones (N.Z.)
- Olearia propinqua S.Moore (W.A.)
- Olearia quercifolia Sieber ex DC. – oak-leaved daisy-bush (N.S.W.)
- Olearia quinquevulnera Heenan (N.Z.)
- Olearia racemosa Domin – Unplaced (Qld.)
- Olearia ramosissima (DC.) Benth. (W.A., Qld., N.S.W.)
- Olearia ramulosa (Labill.) Benth. – twiggy daisy-bush (S.A., Qld., N.S.W., A.C.T., Vic., Tas.)
- Olearia rani (A.Cunn.) Druce – heketara (N.Z.)
- Olearia revoluta Benth. (W.A.)
- Olearia rufa J.Kost (P.N.G.)
- Olearia rugosa (F.Muell. ex W.Archer bis) Hutch. – wrinkled daisy-bush (N.S.W., Vic., Tas.)
- Olearia sarawaketensis Mattf. (New Guinea)
- Olearia speciosa Hutch. (Vic.)
- Olearia spectabilis J.Kost (P.N.G.)
- Olearia stellulata (Labill.) DC. (Vic., Tas.)
- Olearia stenophylla N.G.Walsh (N.S.W.)
- Olearia stilwelliae Blakely (N.S.W.)
- Olearia stricta Benth. (Vic.)
- Olearia strigosa (Steetz) Benth. – bristly daisy bush (W.A.)
- Olearia suavis Cheeseman (South Island N.Z.)
- Olearia subspicata (Hook.) Benth. (W.A., N.T., S.A., Qld., N.S.W., Vic.)
- Olearia tasmanica W.M.Curtis (Tas.)
- Olearia telmatica Heenan & de Lange – shell akeake, swamp akeake (N.Z.)
- Olearia tenuifolia (DC.) Benth. – thin-leaf daisy-bush (N.S.W., A.C.T., Vic.)
- Olearia teretifolia (Sond.) Benth. – cypress daisy-bush (S.A., Vic.)
- Olearia tomentosa (J.C.Wendl.) Benth. – toothed daisy-bush (N.S.W., Vic.)
- Olearia traversiorum (F.Muell.) Hook.f. – hakapiri, Chatham Island akeake (N.Z.)
- Olearia tubuliflora (Sond. & F.Muell. ex Sond.) Benth. (S.A., Vic.)
- Olearia velutina J.Kost (P.N.G.)
- Olearia vernonioides C.T.White & Francis (P.N.G.)
- Olearia viscidula (F.Muell.) Benth. – viscid daisy-bush (N.S.W.)

=== Formerly placed here ===
- Ephedrides trifurcata (Lander) G.L.Nesom (aș Olearia trifurcata Lander)
- Landerolaria arckaringensis (P.J.Lang) G.L.Nesom – Arckaringensis daisy (S.A.) (as Olearia arckaringensis P.J.Lang)
- Landerolaria eremaea (Lander) G.L.Nesom (W.A.) (as Olearia eremaea Lander)
- Landerolaria gordonii (Lander) G.L.Nesom (Qld.) (as Olearia gordonii Lander)
- Landerolaria humilis (Lander) G.L.Nesom (W.A.) (as Olearia humilis Lander)
- Landerolaria laciniifolia (Lander) G.L.Nesom (W.A.) (as Olearia laciniifolia Lander)
- Landerolaria macdonnellensis (D.A.Cooke) G.L.Nesom (N.T.) (as Olearia macdonnellensis D.A.Cooke)
- Landerolaria newbeyi (Lander) G.L.Nesom (W.A.) (as Olearia newbeyi Lander)
- Landerolaria orientalis (A.R.Bean & Jobson) G.L.Nesom (Qld.) (as Olearia orientalis A.R.Bean & Jobson)
- Landerolaria stuartii (F.Muell.) G.L.Nesom (W.A., N.T., S.A., Qld.) (as Olearia stuartii (F.Muell.) Benth.)
- Landerolaria xerophila (F.Muell.) G.L.Nesom (W.A., Qld.) (as Olearia xerophila (F.Muell.) Benth.)
- Linealia flocktoniae (Maiden & Betche) G.L.Nesom (as Olearia flocktoniae Maiden & Betche)
- Macrolearia angustifolia (Hook.f.) Saldivia – teteaweka (N.Z.) (as Olearia angustifolia Hook.f.)
- Macrolearia chathamica (Kirk) Saldivia (N.Z.) (as Olearia chathamica Kirk)
- Macrolearia lyallii (Hook.f.) Saldivia – subantarctic tree daisy (N.Z.) (as Olearia lyallii Hook.f.)
- Macrolearia oporina (G.Forst.) Saldivia (N.Z.) (as Olearia oporina (G.Forst.) Hook.f.)
- Muellerolaria picridifolia (F.Muell.) G.L.Nesom (W.A., S.A., Vic.) (as Olearia picridifolia (F.Muell.) Benth.)
- Muellerolaria rudis (Benth.) G.L.Nesom (S.A., N.S.W., Vic.) (as Olearia rudis (Benth.) F.Muell. ex Benth.)
- Neolaria ferresii (F.Muell.) G.L.Nesom (W.A., N.T., S.A., Qld.) (as Olearia ferresii (F.Muell.) Benth.)
- Neolaria mucronata (Lander) G.L.Nesom (W.A.) (as Olearia mucronata Lander )
- Phaseolaster elliptica (DC.) G.L.Nesom – sticky daisy-bush (Qld., N.S.W.) (as Olearia elliptica DC.)
- Shawia albida (Hook.f.) Sch.Bip. – tanguru (N.Z.) (as Olearia albida (Hook.f.) Hook.f.)
- Shawia arborescens (G.Forst.) Sch.Bip. – common tree daisy, glossy tree daisy (N.Z.) (as Olearia arborescens (G.Forst.) Cockayne & Laing)
- Shawia argophylla (Labill.) Baill. – musk daisy-bush, native musk, silver shrub (N.S.W., Vic.) (as Olearia argophylla (Labill.) F.Muell. ex Benth.)
- Shawia avicenniifolia Raoul – akeake (N.Z.) (as Olearia avicenniifolia (Raoul) Hook.f.)
- Shawia chrysophylla (DC.) Sch.Bip. (N.S.W., Qld.) (as Olearia chrysophylla (DC.) Benth.)
- Shawia cydoniifolia (DC.) Sch.Bip. (Qld., N.S.W.) (as Olearia cydoniifolia (DC.) Benth.)
- Shawia erubescens (Sieber ex Spreng.) Sch.Bip. – pink-tip daisy-bush, moth daisy-bush (S.A., N.S.W., A.C.T., Vic., Tas.) (as Olearia erubescens (Sieber ex Spreng.) Dippel)
- Shawia furfuracea (A.Rich.) Raoul ex Sch.Bip. – akepiro or Coromandel tree daisy (N.Z.) (as Olearia furfuracea (A.Rich.) Hook.f. or O. townsonii Cheeseman)
- Shawia ledifolia (DC.) Sch.Bip. – rock daisy bush (Tas.) (as Olearia ledifolia (DC.) Benth.)
- Shawia myrsinoides (Labill.) Sch.Bip. – blush daisy-bush, silky daisy-bush (N.S.W., A.C.T., Vic., Tas.) (as Olearia myrsinoides (Labill.) F.Muell. ex Benth.)
- Shawia nummulariifolia (Hook.f.) Sch.Bip. (N.Z.) (as Olearia nummulariifolia (Hook.f.) Hook.f.)
- Shawia obcordata (Hook.f.) Sch.Bip. (Tas.) (as Olearia obcordata (Hook.f.) Benth.)
- Shawia paniculata J.R.Forst. & G.Forst. – akiraho (N.Z.) (as Olearia paniculata (J.R.Forst. & G.Forst.) Druce)
- Shawia persoonioides (DC.) Sch.Bip. (Tas.) (as Olearia persoonioides (DC.) Benth.)
- Shawia pinifolia (Hook.f.) Sch.Bip. (Tas.) (as Olearia pinifolia (Hook.f.) Benth.)
- Shawia rosmarinifolia (DC.) Sch.Bip. (Qld., N.S.W.) (as Olearia rosmarinifolia (DC.) Benth.)
- Shawia solandri (Hook.f.) Sch.Bip. – coastal tree daisy (N.Z.) (as Olearia solandri (Hook.f.) Hook.f.)
- Shawia virgata (Hook.f.) Sch.Bip. (N.Z.) (as Olearia virgata (Hook.f.) Hook.f.)
- Shawia viscosa (Labill.) Sch.Bip. – sticky daisy-bush (Vic., Tas.) (as Olearia viscosa (Labill.) Benth.)
- Spongotrichum glandulosum (Labill.) G.L.Nesom – swamp daisy-bush (S.A., Qld., N.S.W., A.C.T., Vic., Tas.) (as Olearia glandulosa (Labill.) Benth.)
- Spongotrichum suffruticosum (D.A.Cooke) G.L.Nesom – clustered daisy-bush (S.A., N.S.W., Vic.) (as Olearia suffruticosa D.A.Cooke)
- Vicinia ciliata (Benth.) G.L.Nesom – fringed daisy-bush (W.A., S.A., Vic., Tas.) (as Olearia ciliata (Benth.) F.Muell. ex Benth.)
- Walsholaria calcarea (F.Muell. ex Benth.) G.L.Nesom – limestone daisy bush (W.A., S.A., Vic., N.S.W.) (as Olearia calcarea F.Muell. ex Benth.)
- Walsholaria cuneifolia (A.R.Bean & M.T.Mathieson) G.L.Nesom (Qld.) (as Olearia cuneifolia A.R.Bean & M.T.Mathieson)
- Walsholaria magniflora (F.Muell.) G.L.Nesom – splendid daisy-bush (W.A., S.A., N.S.W., Vic.) (as Olearia magniflora (F.Muell.) Benth.)
- Walsholaria muelleri (Sond.) G.L.Nesom – Goldfields daisy, Mueller's daisy bush (W.A., S.A., Vic., N.S.W.) (as Olearia muelleri (Sond.) Benth.)
- Wollemiaster cordatus (Lander) G.L.Nesom (as Olearia cordata Lander)

== Use in horticulture ==
Several species are cultivated as ornamental garden plants, and there are hybrids of uncertain or mixed parentage. Among these, the following have been given the Royal Horticultural Society's Award of Garden Merit:-

- Olearia macrodonta, New Zealand holly
- Olearia × mollis 'Zennorensis', daisy bush 'Zennorensis'
- Olearia × scilloniensis
- Olearia × scilloniensis 'Master Michael'

They are generally hardy down to −10 °C (14 °F), but require a sheltered spot in full sun.
