= Olearia incana =

Scientific classification
- Kingdom: Plantae
- Clade: Tracheophytes
- Clade: Angiosperms
- Clade: Eudicots
- Clade: Asterids
- Order: Asterales
- Family: Asteraceae
- Genus: Olearia
- Species: O. incana

Binomial name
- Olearia incana (D.A.Cooke) Lander

Synonyms
- Olearia pimeleoides subsp. incana D.A.Cooke

Species of flowering plant

Olearia incana is a species of flowering plant in the family Asteraceae and is endemic to southern Australia. It is a shrub with narrowly elliptic or wedge-shaped leaves and white and pale yellow, daisy-like inflorescences.

== Description ==
Olearia incana is a shrub that typically grows to a height of 0.5–2 m (1 ft 8 in – 6 ft 7 in). Its leaves are arranged alternately along the branchlets, narrowly elliptic to wedge-shaped, 2–18 mm (0.079–0.709 in) long, 1–4 mm (0.039–0.157 in) wide and sessile. The edges of the leaves are sometimes coarsely toothed and both side are covered with woolly, greyish hairs. The heads or daisy-like "flowers" are arranged singly or in twos or threes on the ends of branchlets on a peduncle up to 90 mm (3.5 in) long, each head with 11 to 21 white ray florets surrounding 20 to 27 pale yellow disc florets. Flowering occurs from June to November and the fruit is a silky-hairy achene, the pappus with 37 to 56 bristles.

== Taxonomy ==
This olearia was first formally described in 1985 by David Alan Cooke who gave it the name Olearia pimeleoides subsp. incana in the Journal of the Adelaide Botanic Gardens, based on material collected by Peter Bruce Copley near Maralinga in 1969. In 2008, Nicholas Sèan Lander raised the subspecies to species status as Olearia incana in the journal Nuytsia. The specific epithet (incana) means "greyish", referring to the foliage.

== Distribution and habitat ==
Olearia incana grows in open woodland and forest, on flats and sandplains in the south-east of Western Australia, the southern half of South Australia, eastern Victoria and western New South Wales.

== Conservation status ==
This daisy bush is listed as "not threatened" by the Department of Biodiversity, Conservation and Attractions.
