= Olearia occidentissima =

Conservation status
- Priority Two — Poorly Known Taxa (DEC)

Scientific classification
- Kingdom: Plantae
- Clade: Tracheophytes
- Clade: Angiosperms
- Clade: Eudicots
- Clade: Asterids
- Order: Asterales
- Family: Asteraceae
- Genus: Olearia
- Species: O. occidentissima

Binomial name
- Olearia occidentissima Lander

Species of shrub

Olearia occidentissima is a species of flowering plant in the family Asteraceae and is endemic to the extreme west of Western Australia. It is an erect or prostrate, wind-pruned shrub with narrowly elliptic leaves that are woolly-hairy on the lower surface, and white, daisy-like inflorescences.

== Description ==
Olearia occidentissima is an erect or prostrate, wind-pruned shrub that typically grows up to 20 cm (7.9 in) high, its stems and leaves densely hairy. The leaves are arranged alternately, scattered along the branchlets, narrowly elliptic, mostly 6–24 mm (0.24–0.94 in) long and 3–6 mm (0.12–0.24 in) wide. The upper surface of the leaves is greyish-green and the lower surface covered with woolly hairs. The heads or daisy-like "flowers" are arranged singly on the ends of branches, the leaves grading to the hemispherical involucre at the base. Each head is 25–30 mm (0.98–1.18 in) in diameter with ten to twelve white or pink ray florets, the ligule 7.4–11 mm (0.29–0.43 in) long, surrounding about 25 disc florets. Flowering occurs in September and the fruit is an achene 2.5–2.8 mm (0.098–0.110 in) long, the pappus with about 75 bristles.

== Taxonomy ==
Olearia occidentissima was first formally described in 1990 by Nicholas Sèan Lander in the journal Nuytsia from specimens collected by Alex George on Dirk Hartog Island in 1972. The specific epithet (occidentissima) means "most westerly", referring to this species having the most westerly distribution of Olearia species.

== Distribution and habitat ==
This daisy bush grows on shallow soil on coastal limestone cliffs in the Carnarvon and Yalgoo bioregions in the extreme west of Western Australia, including on Dirk Hartog Island and Francois Peron National Park.

== Conservation status ==
Olearia occidentissima is listed as "Priority Two" by the Western Australian Government Department of Biodiversity, Conservation and Attractions, meaning that it is poorly known and from only one or a few locations.
