= Olearia strigosa =

Conservation status
- Priority Three — Poorly Known Taxa (DEC)

Scientific classification
- Kingdom: Plantae
- Clade: Embryophytes
- Clade: Tracheophytes
- Clade: Angiosperms
- Clade: Eudicots
- Clade: Asterids
- Order: Asterales
- Family: Asteraceae
- Genus: Olearia
- Species: O. strigosa

Binomial name
- Olearia strigosa (Steetz) Benth.

Synonyms
- Aster steetzii F.Muell.; Eurybia aspera Steetz; Eurybia strigosa Steetz; Olearia steetzii F.Muell. nom. inval., pro syn.; Shawia aspera (Steetz) Sch.Bip.; Shawia strigosa (Steetz) Sch.Bip.

Species of flowering plant

Olearia strigosa, commonly known as bristly daisy bush, is a species of flowering plant in the family Asteraceae and is endemic to the south-west of Western Australia. It is an erect shrub with linear leaves and blue or purple, daisy-like inflorescences.

== Description ==
Olearia strigosa is a shrub that typically grows to a height of up to 0.5–1.5 m (1 ft 8 in – 4 ft 11 in), its stems and leaves covered with bristly hairs. The leaves are linear, 2.5–18 mm (0.098–0.709 in) long and 1.0–2.5 mm (0.039–0.098 in) wide and sessile or on a petiole up to 1 mm (0.039 in) long. The heads or daisy-like "flowers" are arranged singly or in racemes on the ends of branches on a peduncle up to 22 mm (0.87 in) long and are 11–20 mm (0.43–0.79 in) in diameter with a conical or hemispherical involucre at the base. Each head has 7 to 11 blue or purple ray florets, the ligule 7.0–9.5 mm (0.28–0.37 in) long, surrounding 9 to 30 disc florets. Flowering occurs from January to May and the fruit is an achene, the pappus with 30 to 56 long bristles and 4 to 10 short ones.

== Taxonomy ==
This daisy was first formally described in 1845 by Joachim Steetz who gave it the name Eurybia strigosa in Johann Georg Christian Lehmann's Plantae Preissianae. In 1867 George Bentham changed the name to Olearia strigosa in Flora Australiensis. The specific epithet (strigosa) means "strigose".

== Distribution and habitat ==
Bristly daisy bush grows with herbs and sedges in the understorey of low woodland in the southern part of the Swan Coastal Plain and the Jarrah Forest bioregions of south-western Western Australia.

== Conservation status ==
Olearia strigosa is listed as "Priority Three" by the Government of Western Australia Department of Biodiversity, Conservation and Attractions, meaning that it is poorly known and known from only a few locations but is not under imminent threat.
