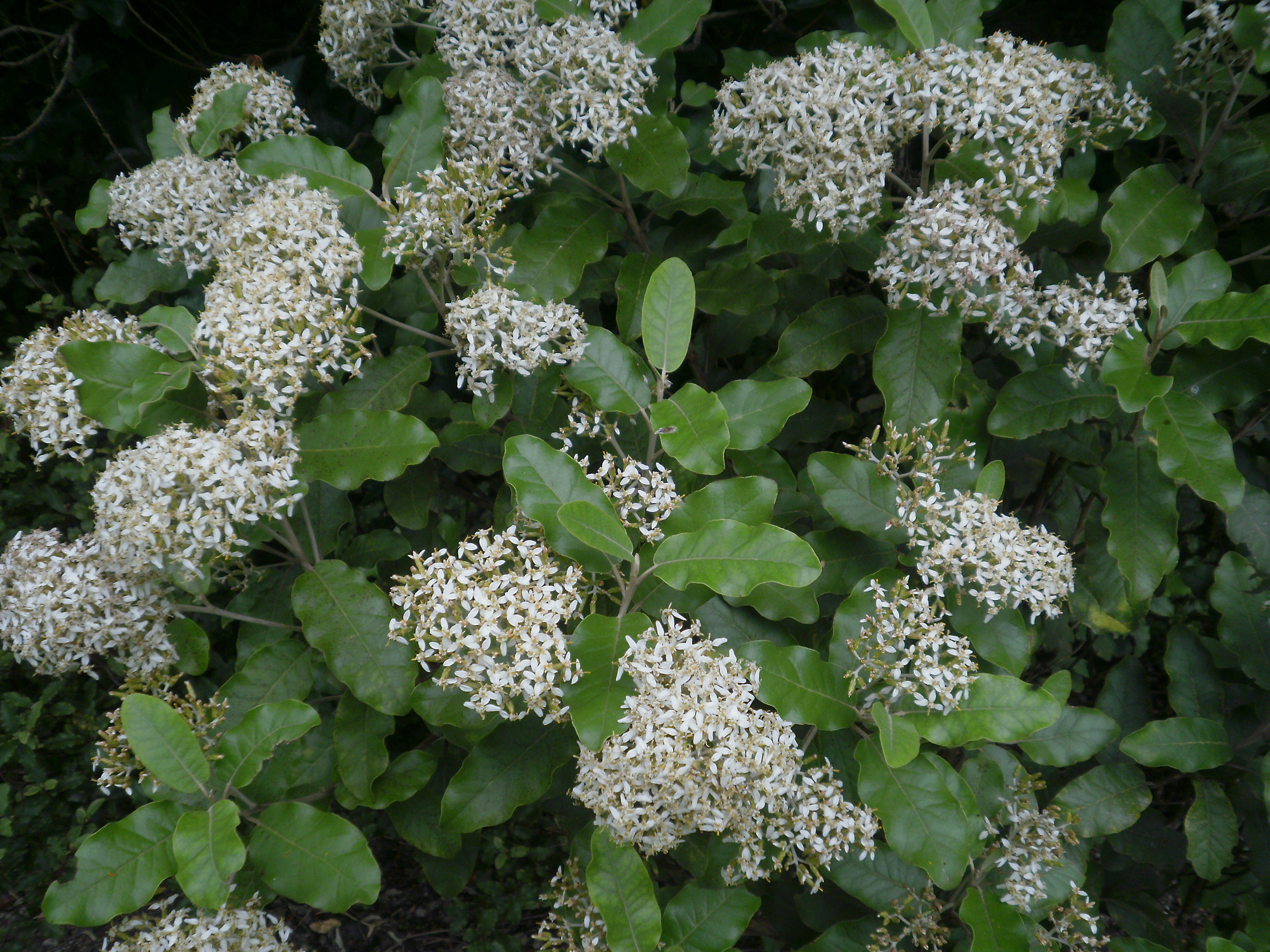

Conservation status
- Data Deficient (IUCN 2.3)

Scientific classification
- Kingdom: Plantae
- Clade: Tracheophytes
- Clade: Angiosperms
- Clade: Eudicots
- Clade: Asterids
- Order: Asterales
- Family: Asteraceae
- Genus: Olearia
- Species: O. angulata

Binomial name
- Olearia angulata T.Kirk

= Olearia angulata =

Species of flowering plant

Olearia angulata is a species of flowering plant in the family Asteraceae. It is found only in New Zealand.

Māori name - Ngungu
