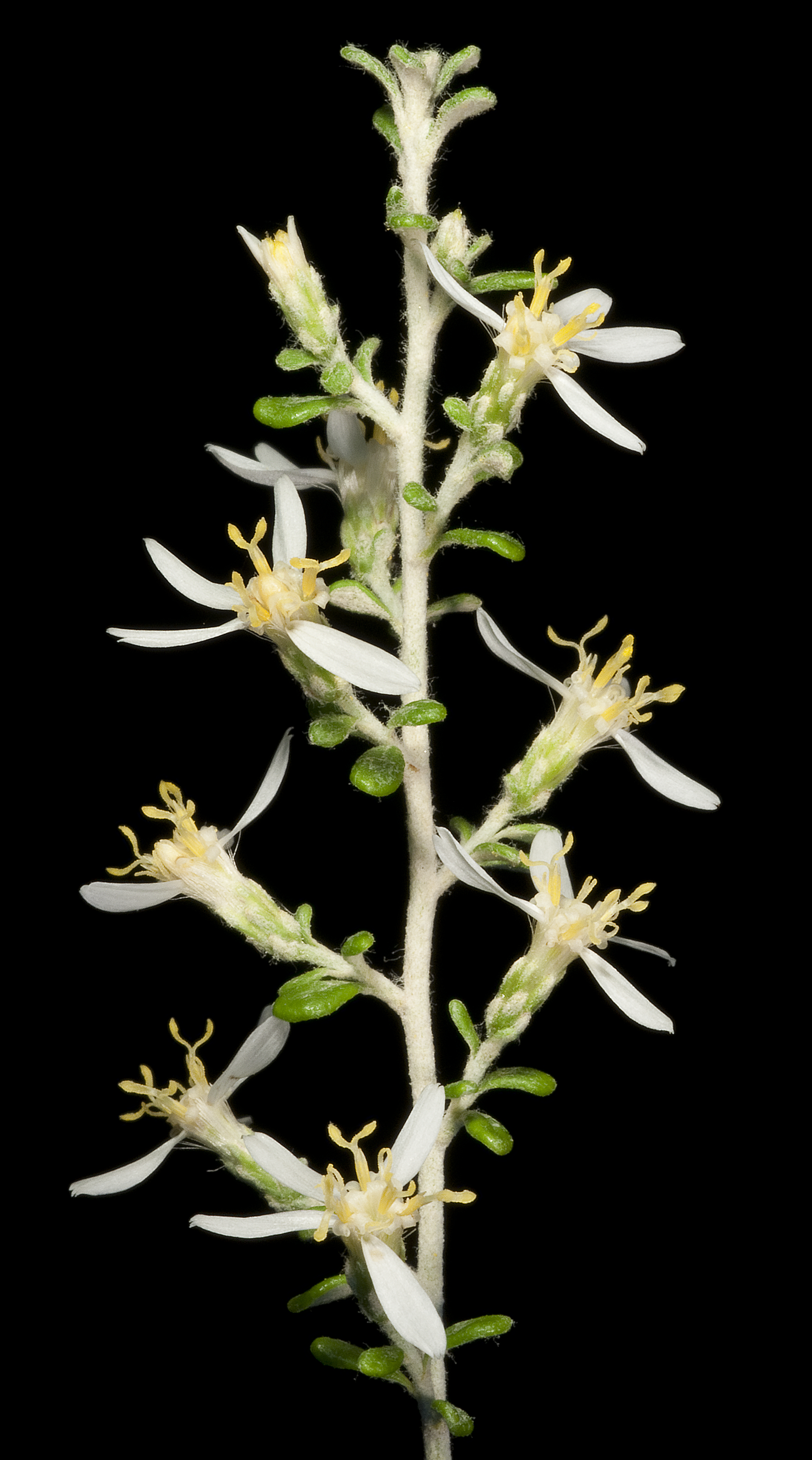

Scientific classification
- Kingdom: Plantae
- Clade: Tracheophytes
- Clade: Angiosperms
- Clade: Eudicots
- Clade: Asterids
- Order: Asterales
- Family: Asteraceae
- Genus: Olearia
- Species: O. exiguifolia

Binomial name
- Olearia exiguifolia (F.Muell.) F.Muell. ex Benth.

Synonyms
- Aster exiguifolius F.Muell.; Olearia exiguifolia F.Muell. nom. inval., pro syn.

= Olearia exiguifolia =

Species of Asteraceae

Olearia exiguifolia commonly known as small-leaved daisy bush, is a species of flowering plant in the family Asteraceae and is endemic to south-western Australia. It is an erect or straggly shrub with broadly egg-shaped leaves with the narrower end towards the base, and white and yellow, daisy-like inflorescences.

== Description ==
Olearia exiguifolia is an erect or straggly shrub that typically grows to a height of up to 2 m (6 ft 7 in) and has many branches that are covered with woolly hairs flattened against the surface. The leaves are broadly egg-shaped with the narrower end towards the base, to wedge-shaped, 2–6 mm (0.079–0.236 in) long and 2–4 mm (0.079–0.157 in) wide, usually with three teeth at the tip. The upper surface of the leaves is dark green and the lower surface covered with woolly, cream- to rust-coloured hairs. The heads or daisy-like "flowers" are arranged singly on the ends of branchlets, each head with five or six white ray florets, the ligule oblong and about 4 mm (0.16 in) long, surrounding five or six yellow disc florets. Flowering occurs from July to February and the fruit is a hairy achene about 2 mm (0.079 in) long, the pappus with thirty to forty bristles 3–4 mm (0.12–0.16 in) long.

== Taxonomy ==
Small-leaved daisy bush was first formally described in 1865 by Ferdinand von Mueller who gave it the name Aster exiguifolius in Fragmenta Phytographiae Australiae from specimens collected by George Maxwell. In 1867, George Bentham changed the name to Olearia exiguifolia in Flora Australiensis. The specific epithet (exiguifolia) means "small-leaved".

== Distribution and habitat ==
Olearia exiguifolia mainly grows in scrub on sand dunes and is widely distributed in southern inland areas of Western Australia and in south-western South Australia as far east as the Eyre and Yorke Peninsulas.
