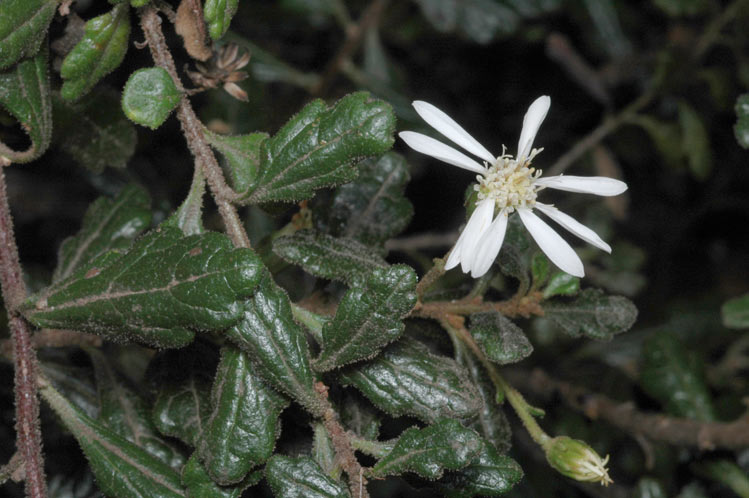
- In the Australian National Botanic Gardens

Scientific classification
- Kingdom: Plantae
- Clade: Tracheophytes
- Clade: Angiosperms
- Clade: Eudicots
- Clade: Asterids
- Order: Asterales
- Family: Asteraceae
- Genus: Olearia
- Species: O. quercifolia

Binomial name
- Olearia quercifolia Sieber ex DC.

Synonyms
- Aster cuneatus Steud. nom. inval., pro syn.; Aster quercifolius DC. nom. inval., pro syn.; Aster sinuatus A.Cunn. nom. inval., pro syn.; Olearia stellulata f. quercifolia (Sieber ex DC.) Siebert & Voss; Olearia stellulata var. quercifolia (Sieber ex DC.) Benth.

= Olearia quercifolia =

Species of shrub

Olearia quercifolia, commonly known as oak-leaved olearia, is a species of flowering plant in the family Asteraceae, and is endemic to the Blue Mountains in New South Wales. It is a shrub with elliptic to egg-shaped leaves with the narrower end towards the base, and white and yellow daisy flowers.

== Description ==
Olearia quercifolia is a shrub that typically grows to a height of 2 m (6 ft 7 in). It has scattered elliptic to egg-shaped leaves with the narrower end towards the base arranged alternately along the stems, the leaves 10–50 mm (0.39–1.97 in) long and 7–25 mm (0.28–0.98 in) wide on a petiole up to 7 mm (0.28 in) long. The edges of the leaves are lobed and the lower surface is covered with yellow, woolly hairs. The heads or daisy-like "flowers" are arranged in leaf axils on a peduncle up to 50 mm (2.0 in) long, each head 21–30 mm (0.83–1.18 in) in diameter with 7 to 15 white ray florets and 18 to 29 yellow disc florets. Flowering occurs from July to December and the achenes are glabrous, the pappus with 27 to 42 long bristles.

== Taxonomy and naming ==
Olearia quercifolia was first formally described in 1836 by Augustin Pyramus de Candolle in his Prodromus Systematis Naturalis Regni Vegetabilis, from an unpublished description of specimens collected by Allan Cunningham. The specific epithet (quercifolia) means "oak-leaved".

== Distribution and habitat ==
Oak-leaved olearia grows in swampy places in the Blue Mountains of eastern New South Wales.
