= Olearia fluvialis =

Scientific classification
- Kingdom: Plantae
- Clade: Tracheophytes
- Clade: Angiosperms
- Clade: Eudicots
- Clade: Asterids
- Order: Asterales
- Family: Asteraceae
- Genus: Olearia
- Species: O. fluvialis

Binomial name
- Olearia fluvialis Lander

Species of shrub

Olearia fluvialis is a species of flowering plant in the family Asteraceae and is endemic to inland areas of northern Western Australia. It is a shrub with scattered, narrowly egg-shaped leaves, and white or mauve and yellow, daisy-like inflorescences.

== Description ==
Olearia fluvialis is a shrub that typically grows to a height of up to 0.6 m (2 ft 0 in). Its stems and leaves are covered with minute glandular hairs. The leaves are arranged alternately along the branchlets, narrowly egg-shaped, 2–9 mm (0.079–0.354 in) long and 1–2 mm (0.039–0.079 in) wide. The heads or daisy-like "flowers" are arranged singly on the ends of branchlets and are 8.8–12.5 mm (0.35–0.49 in) in diameter on a peduncle up to 76 mm (3.0 in) long. Each head has twelve to fourteen white or mauve ray florets, the ligule 3.8–4.5 mm (0.15–0.18 in) long, surrounding about twelve yellow disc florets. Flowering occurs in April or May and the fruit is a pale brown, silky-hairy achene, the pappus with 16 to 25 long bristles and a smaller number of much shorter ones.

== Taxonomy ==
Olearia fluvialis was first formally described in 1990 by Nicholas Sèan Lander in the journal Nuytsia from specimens collected near the "Fortesque River [by] W. Cussock" (possibly Fortescue River by William Henry Cusack) in 1895. The specific epithet (fluvialis) refers to the riverine habitat preference of this species.

== Distribution and habitat ==
Olearia fluvialis grows in stony creek beds in the Murchison and Pilbara biogeographic regions of northern Western Australia.

== Conservation status ==
This daisy bush is listed as "not threatened" by the Department of Biodiversity, Conservation and Attractions.
