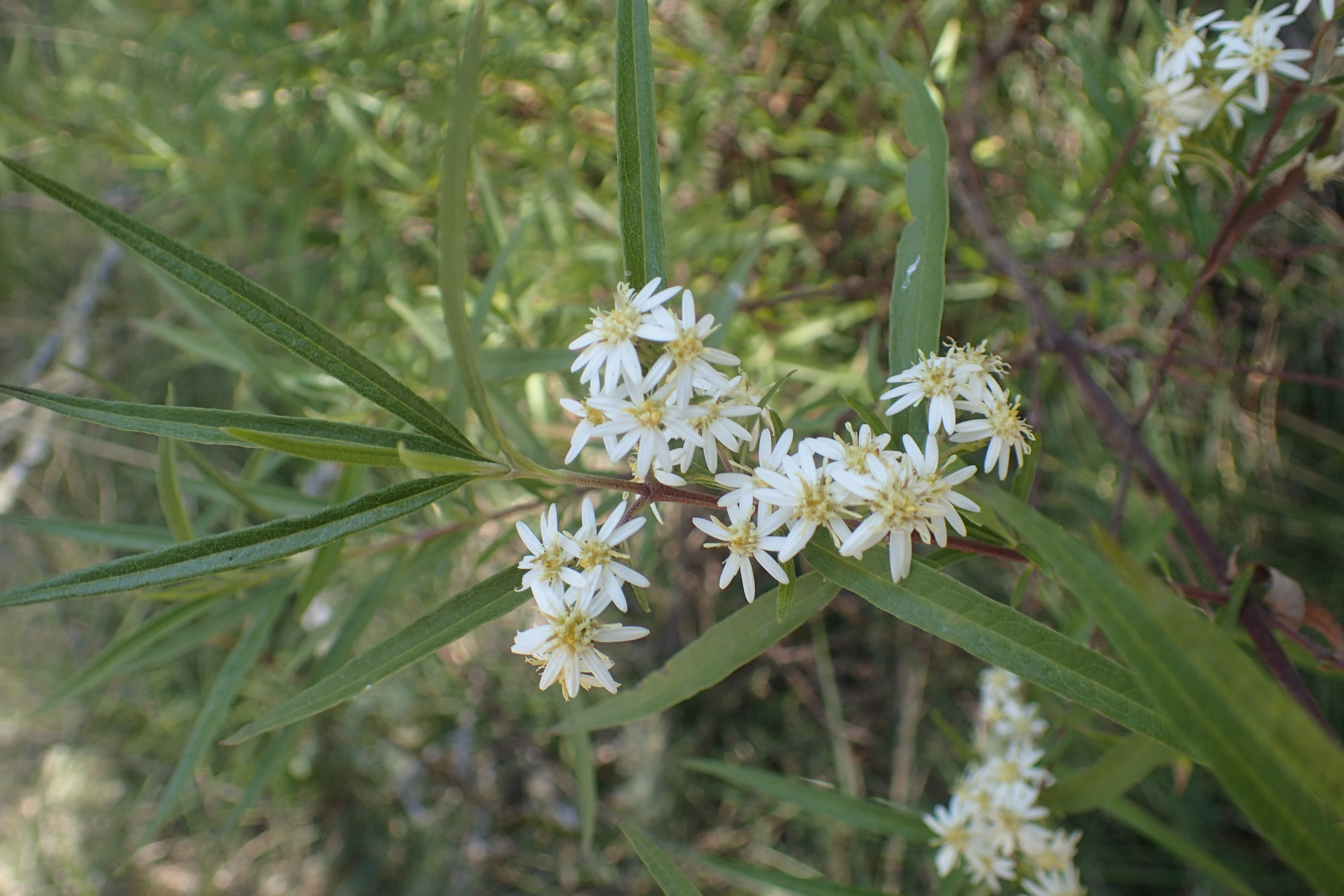
- Near Wollomombi Falls

Scientific classification
- Kingdom: Plantae
- Clade: Tracheophytes
- Clade: Angiosperms
- Clade: Eudicots
- Clade: Asterids
- Order: Asterales
- Family: Asteraceae
- Genus: Olearia
- Species: O. viscidula

Binomial name
- Olearia viscidula (F.Muell.) Benth.

Synonyms
- Aster siemssenii F.Muell.; Eurybia viscidula F.Muell.; Olearia siemssenii F.Muell. nom. inval., pro syn.

= Olearia viscidula =

Viscid daisy bush

Species of flowering plant

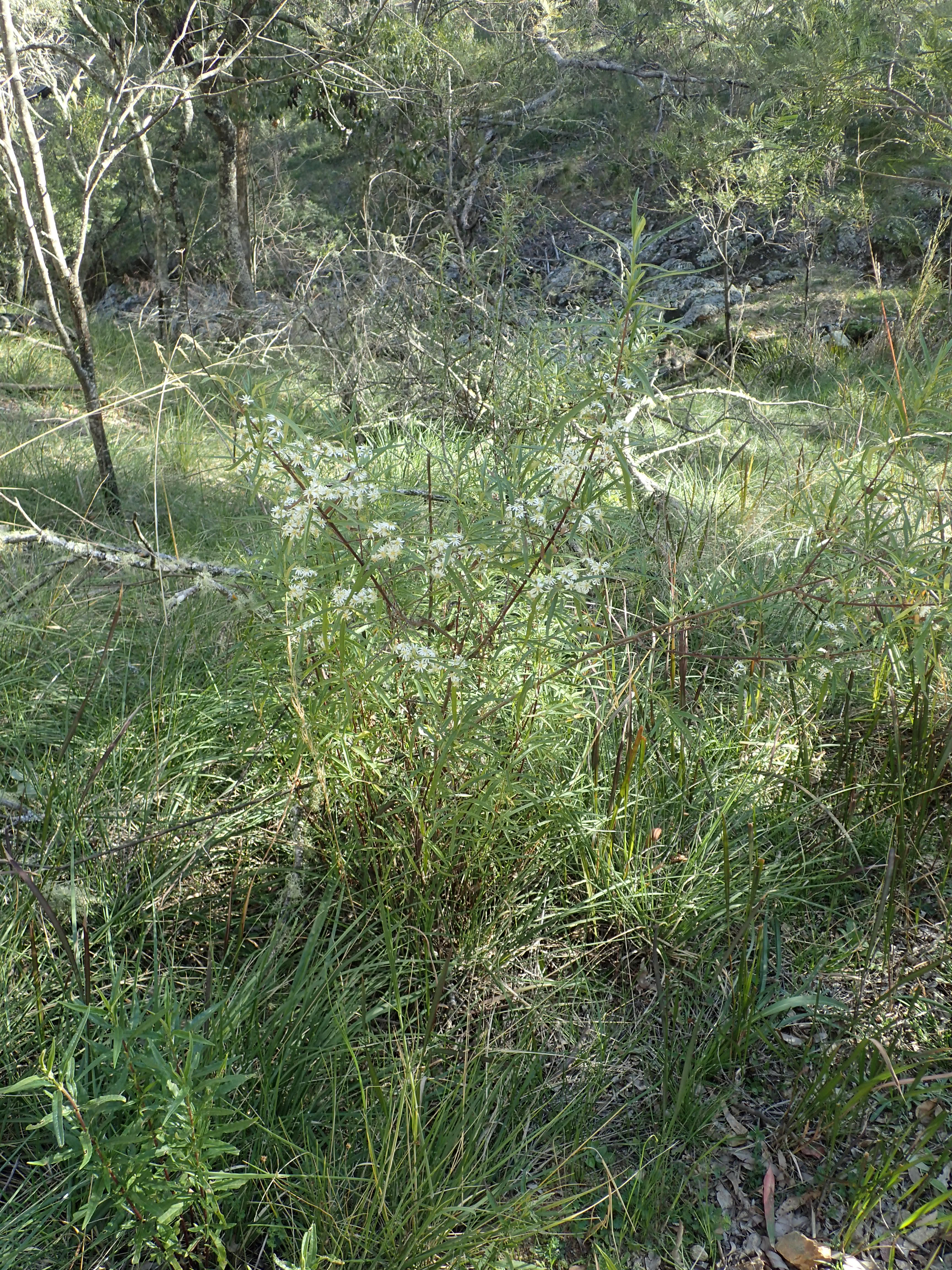
Habit

Olearia viscidula, commonly known as the viscid daisy bush or wallaby weed, is a species of flowering plant in the family Asteraceae and is endemic to eastern New South Wales. It is a shrub with scattered narrow elliptic or egg-shaped leaves that are paler on the lower surface, and panicles of white flowers arranged in leaf axils.

== Description ==
Olearia viscidula is a woody shrub reaching 1.5–3.5 m (4 ft 11 in – 11 ft 6 in) high and 1–2 m (3 ft 3 in – 6 ft 7 in) wide. The oval leaves are alternately arranged along the stems and are up to 1.5–8.8 cm (0.59–3.46 in) long and 0.2–1.1 cm (0.079–0.433 in) wide with entire margins. The upper leaf surfaces are shiny green, while the leaf undersides are covered with pale grey fur. The stems and new growth are sometimes covered in resin. Flowering takes place from July to November, and can be profuse. The disc is cream or yellow and rays are white, the daisy-like flower heads 0.8 to 1.7 cm (0.31 to 0.67 in) in diameter.

== Taxonomy and naming ==
Viscid daisy bush was first formally described in 1858 by Ferdinand von Mueller and given the name Eurybia viscidula Fragmenta Phytographiae Australiae from material collected by Charles Moore near Goulburn. In 1867, George Bentham changed the name to Olearia viscidula in his book Flora Australiensis. The species name is Latin "slightly sticky".

== Distribution and habitat ==
Olearia viscidula occurs in eastern New South Wales, where it is found south of the Nandewar Rangesand where it grows in tall eucalypt forest and rainforest as well as dry sclerophyll forest and woodland, on medium- or high-nutrient soils.

== Ecology ==
This daisy bush resprouts from a lignotuber after bushfire.

== Use in horticulture ==
Seldom seen in cultivation, O. viscidula grows in soil with good drainage in a part-shaded location. Regular pruning prevents the plant from becoming leggy. The species is frost-hardy. It can be propagated by seed or cutting.
