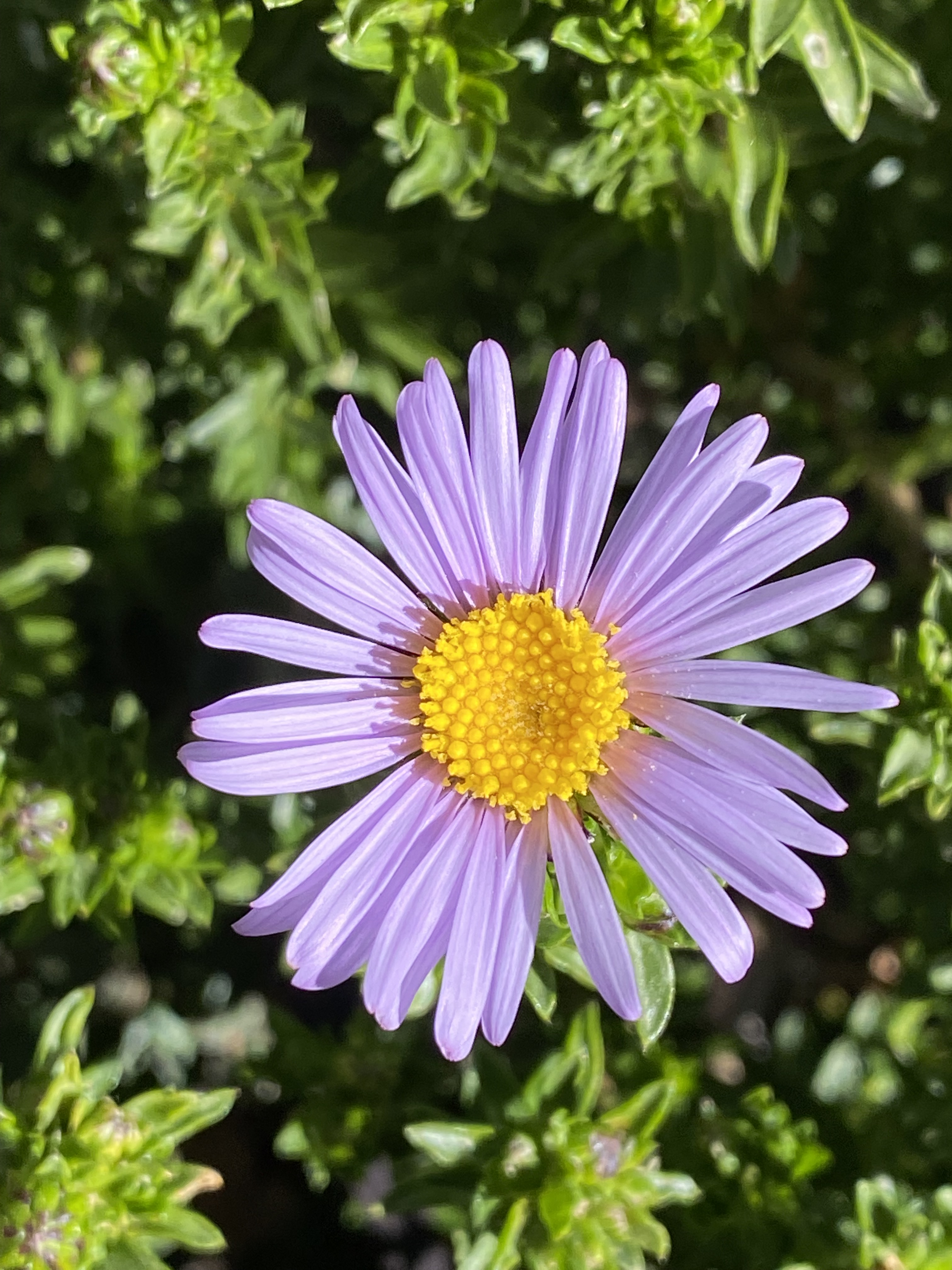

Scientific classification
- Kingdom: Plantae
- Clade: Tracheophytes
- Clade: Angiosperms
- Clade: Eudicots
- Clade: Asterids
- Order: Asterales
- Family: Asteraceae
- Genus: Olearia
- Species: O. homolepis

Binomial name
- Olearia homolepis (F.Muell.) Benth.

Synonyms
- Aster homolepis F.Muell.

= Olearia homolepis =

Species of flowering plant

Olearia homolepis is a species of flowering plant in the family Asteraceae and is endemic to Western Australia. It is a shrub with linear leaves and white or blue and yellow, daisy-like inflorescences.

== Description ==
Olearia homolepis is a shrub that typically grows to a height of 0.2–1 m (7.9 in – 3 ft 3.4 in) and has wand-like branches. Its leaves are linear, 100–200 mm (3.9–7.9 in) long and about 25 mm (0.98 in) wide. The heads or daisy-like "flowers" are arranged in pairs or threes on the ends of branchlets on a peduncle that is shorter than the leaves. Each head has more than twenty white or blue ray florets and many yellow disc florets. Flowering occurs from July to November and the fruit is a silky-hairy achene, the pappus with both long and short bristles.

== Taxonomy ==
The species was formally described in 1865 by Victorian Government Botanist Ferdinand von Mueller who gave it the name Aster homolepis in Fragmenta Phytographiae Australiae, based on plant material collected in the vicinity of the Murchison River by Augustus Oldfield. In 1867, George Bentham changed the name to Olearia homolepis in Flora Australiensis. The specific epithet (homolepis) means "equal scale" referring to the size of the bracts.

== Distribution and habitat ==
Olearia homolepis is widespread in the south-west of Western Australia, growing in sandy soil in the Avon Wheatbelt, Coolgardie, Geraldton Sandplains, Jarrah Forest and Mallee biogeographic regions.

== Conservation status ==
This daisy bush is listed as "not threatened" by the Department of Biodiversity, Conservation and Attractions.
