= Olearia imbricata =

Scientific classification
- Kingdom: Plantae
- Clade: Tracheophytes
- Clade: Angiosperms
- Clade: Eudicots
- Clade: Asterids
- Order: Asterales
- Family: Asteraceae
- Genus: Olearia
- Species: O. imbricata

Binomial name
- Olearia imbricata (Turcz.) Benth.

Synonyms
- Aster turczaninovii F.Muell.; Aster turczaninowii F.Muell. orth. var.; Eurybia imbricata Turcz.; Olearia turczaninovii F.Muell. nom. inval., pro syn.; Shawia imbricata (Turcz.) Sch.Bip.

Species of flowering plant

Olearia imbricata, commonly known as imbricate daisy bush, is a species of flowering plant in the family Asteraceae and is endemic to the south-west of Western Australia. It is a shrub with small, overlapping linear leaves and bluish-purple or white, daisy-like inflorescences.

== Description ==
Olearia imbricata is a shrub that typically grows to a height of up to 1.2 m (3 ft 11 in). Its leaves are overlapping, linear to wedge-shaped, thick and 2–4 mm (0.079–0.157 in) long. The heads or daisy-like "flowers" are arranged on the ends of branchlets on a short peduncle, each head with fifteen to twenty bluish-purple or white ray florets. Flowering occurs from August to November and the fruit is a short, hairy achene, the pappus with both long and short bristles.

== Taxonomy ==
Imbricate daisy bush was formally described in 1851 by Nikolai Turczaninow who gave it the name Eurybia imbricata in Bulletin de la Société Impériale des Naturalistes de Moscou, based on plant material collected by James Drummond. In 1867, George Bentham changed the name to Olearia imbricata in Flora Australiensis. The specific epithet (imbricata) means "overlapping".

== Distribution and habitat ==
Olearia imbricata grows on plains, breakaways and rocky hills in the Avon Wheatbelt, Esperance Plains and Mallee biogeographic regions of south-western Western Australia.

== Conservation status ==
This daisy bush is listed as "not threatened" by the Department of Biodiversity, Conservation and Attractions.
