= Olearia oliganthema =

Conservation status
- Extinct (EPBC Act)

Scientific classification
- Kingdom: Plantae
- Clade: Tracheophytes
- Clade: Angiosperms
- Clade: Eudicots
- Clade: Asterids
- Order: Asterales
- Family: Asteraceae
- Genus: Olearia
- Species: †O. oliganthema

Binomial name
- †Olearia oliganthema F.Muell. ex Benth.

Species of shrub

Olearia oliganthema is a species of flowering plant in the family Asteraceae and was endemic to New South Wales. It was a shrub with scattered, broadly elliptic leaves, and white and yellow daisy-like inflorescences.

== Description ==
Olearia oliganthema was a shrub with scattered, broadly elliptic leaves, 28–65 mm (1.1–2.6 in) long and 16–40 mm (0.63–1.57 in) wide arranged alternately along the branches, on a petiole up to 16 mm (0.63 in) long. The leaves sometimes had irregular teeth on the edges, and were sometimes wavy. The upper surface of the leaves was glabrous and the lower surface covered with minute, silvery hairs. The heads or daisy-like "flowers" were arranged in dense corymbs and were 9–18 mm (0.35–0.71 in) in diameter and sessile. Each head has one or two white ray florets surrounding three to five yellow disc florets.

== Taxonomy ==
Olearia oliganthema was first formally described in 1867 by George Bentham in Flora Australiensis an unpublished description by Ferdinand von Mueller of small specimens collected in the Blue Mountains in 1866.

== Conservation status ==
Olearia oliganthema is only known from two small specimens collected in the Blue Mountains in 1866, and the species is listed as "extinct" under the Australian Government Environment Protection and Biodiversity Conservation Act 1999 and as "presumed extinct" under the New South Wales Government Biodiversity Conservation Act 2016.
