= Olearia incondita =

Scientific classification
- Kingdom: Plantae
- Clade: Tracheophytes
- Clade: Angiosperms
- Clade: Eudicots
- Clade: Asterids
- Order: Asterales
- Family: Asteraceae
- Genus: Olearia
- Species: O. incondita

Binomial name
- Olearia incondita Lander

Species of shrub

Olearia incondita is a species of flowering plant in the family Asteraceae and is endemic to the south-west of Western Australia. It is a straggly shrub with narrowly elliptic leaves and white or pink and yellow, daisy-like inflorescences.

== Description ==
Olearia incondita is a straggly shrub that typically grows to a height of up to 1.3 m (4 ft 3 in), its stems covered with woolly hairs when you, later glabrous. The leaves are arranged alternately, scattered along the branchlets, narrowly elliptic, 4–14 mm (0.16–0.55 in) long, 1–3 mm (0.039–0.118 in) wide and sessile. The surface of the leaves is pimply, the upper surface glabrous and the lower surface with scattered woolly hairs. The heads or daisy-like "flowers" are arranged singly on the ends of branchlets, more or less sessile and 25–35 mm (0.98–1.38 in) in diameter. Each head has seven to ten white or pink ray florets, the ligule 2.0–2.5 mm (0.079–0.098 in) long, surrounding 10 to 24 yellow disc florets. Flowering occurs from January to April and the fruit is a slightly flattened, pale brown achene, the pappus with 74–102 bristles.

== Taxonomy ==
Olearia incondita was first formally described in 1990 by Nicholas Sèan Lander in the journal Nuytsia from specimens collected by Alison Marjorie Ashby, near Morawa in 1969. The specific epithet (incondita) means "unkempt", referring to the appearance of the plant.

== Distribution and habitat ==
Olearia incondita grows near dry lakes and around granite outcrops in the Avon Wheatbelt, Mallee and Yalgoo biogeographic regions of south-western Western Australia.

== Conservation status ==
This daisy bush is listed as "not threatened" by the Department of Biodiversity, Conservation and Attractions.
