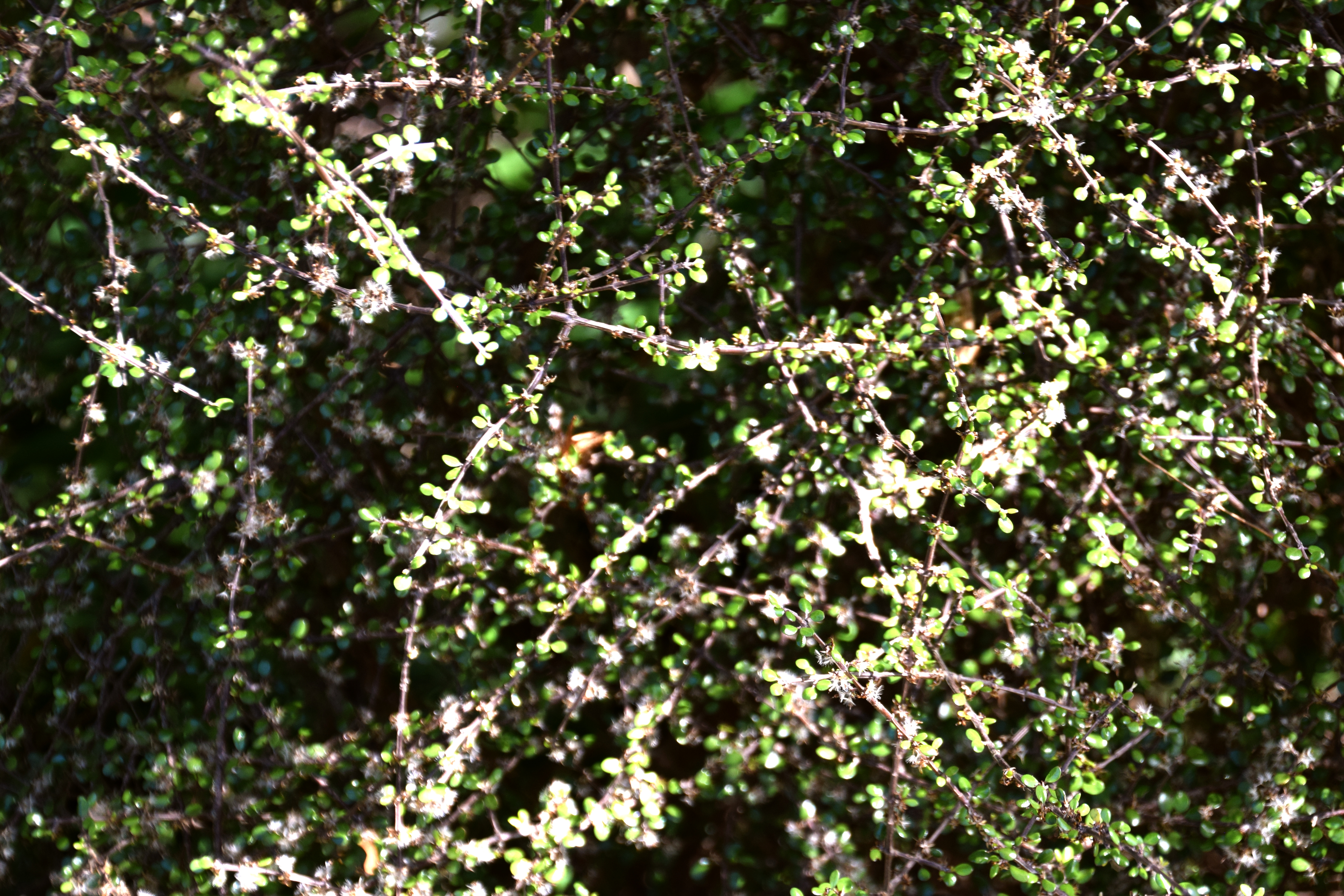
- Olearia polita at Dunedin Botanic Garden in Dunedin, New Zealand

Conservation status
- Endangered (IUCN 2.3)

Scientific classification
- Kingdom: Plantae
- Clade: Tracheophytes
- Clade: Angiosperms
- Clade: Eudicots
- Clade: Asterids
- Order: Asterales
- Family: Asteraceae
- Genus: Olearia
- Species: O. polita

Binomial name
- Olearia polita H.D.Wilson & Garn.-Jones

= Olearia polita =

Species of flowering plant

Olearia polita is a species of flowering plant in the family Asteraceae. It is found only in New Zealand.
