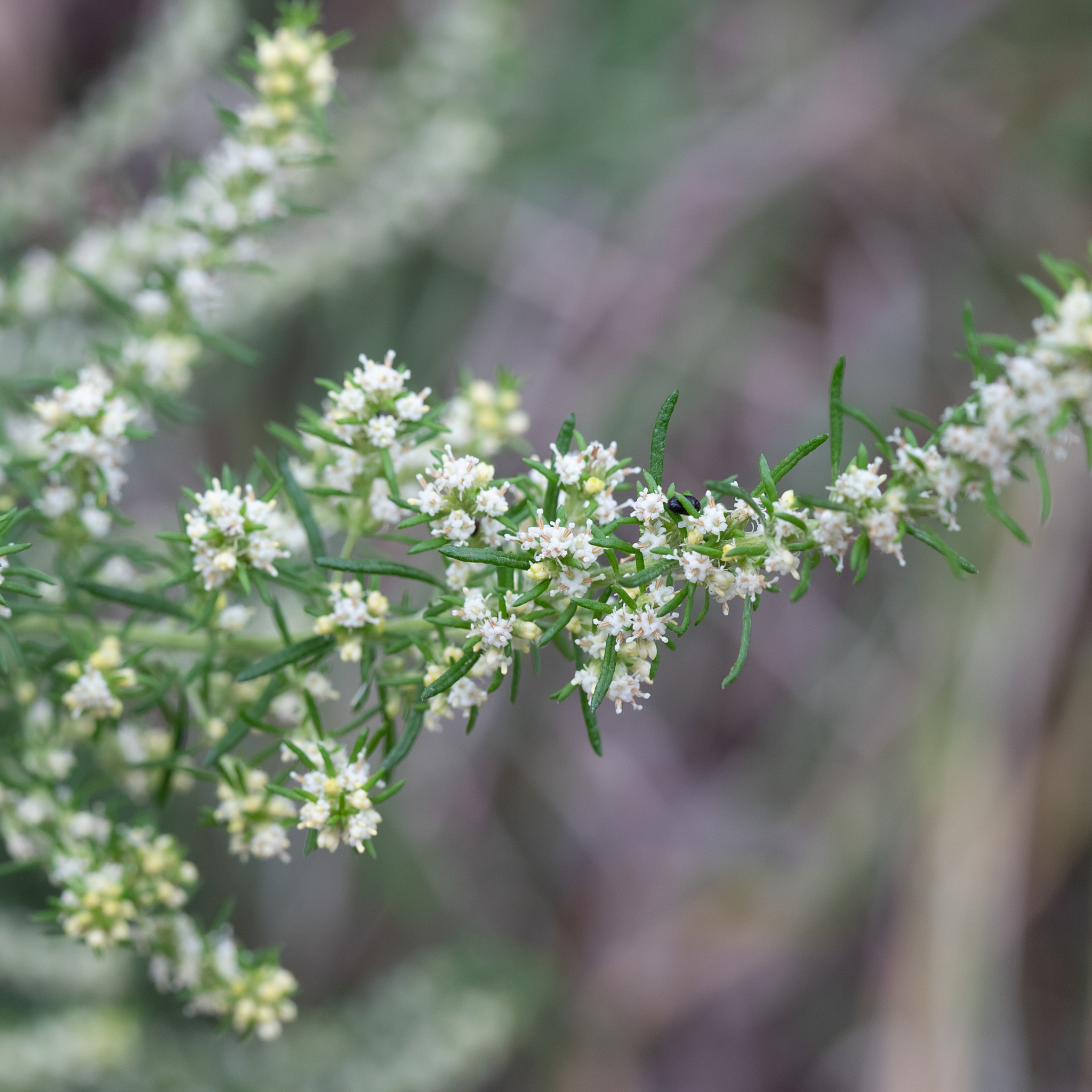
- In the Scott Conservation Park

Scientific classification
- Kingdom: Plantae
- Clade: Tracheophytes
- Clade: Angiosperms
- Clade: Eudicots
- Clade: Asterids
- Order: Asterales
- Family: Asteraceae
- Genus: Olearia
- Species: O. tubuliflora

Binomial name
- Olearia tubuliflora (Sond. & F.Muell. ex Sond.) Benth.

Synonyms
- Aster tubiflorus A.D.Chapm. orth. var.; Aster tubuliflorus (Sond. & F.Muell. ex Sond.) F.Muell.; Eurybia tubiflora A.D.Chapm. orth. var.; Eurybia tubuliflora Sond. & F.Muell. ex Sond.; Olearia tubiflora A.D.Chapm. orth. var.

= Olearia tubuliflora =

Species of plant

Olearia tubuliflora, commonly known as rayless daisy-bush, is a species of flowering plant in the family Asteraceae and is endemic to south-eastern continental Australia. It is a slender, erect shrub with linear or narrowly elliptic leaves and yellow, daisy-like inflorescences but with the ray florets lacking a ligule.

== Description ==
Olearia tubuliflora is a slender, erect shrub that typically grows to a height of up to about 2.5 m (8 ft 2 in) and has cottony-hairy branchlets. The leaves are arranged alternately, more or less sessile, 2–8 mm (0.079–0.315 in) long and 0.5–2 mm (0.020–0.079 in) wide with the edges rolled under. The heads or daisy-like "flowers" are arranged singly in leaf axils, crowded near the ends of the branches, each head sessile and 2–3 mm (0.079–0.118 in) in diameter with a conical involucre 1.7–2.5 mm (0.067–0.098 in) long at the base. Each head has 3 to 5 ray florets lacking a ligule, surrounding 3 to 6 yellow disc florets. Flowering occurs from September to December and the fruit is a ribbed, cylindrical achene 1.0–1.5 mm (0.039–0.059 in) long, the pappus about 2 mm (0.079 in) long.

== Taxonomy ==
This daisy was first formally described in 1853 by Otto Wilhelm Sonder and Ferdinand von Mueller who gave it the name Eurybia tubuliflora in the journal Linnaea, based on plant material collected from the Mount Lofty Ranges. In 1867 by George Bentham changed the name to Olearia tubuliflora in Flora Australiensis.

== Distribution and habitat ==
Olearia tubuliflora grows in forest and woodland in north-central Victoria and in the south-east of South Australia.
