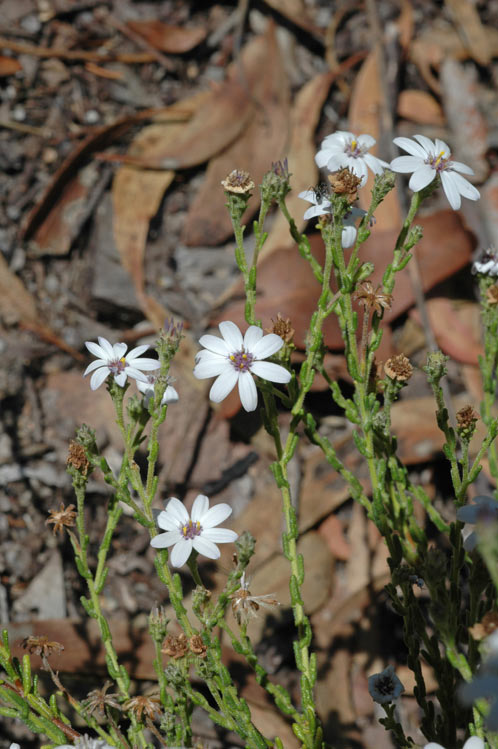
- In the Australian National Botanic Gardens

Scientific classification
- Kingdom: Plantae
- Clade: Tracheophytes
- Clade: Angiosperms
- Clade: Eudicots
- Clade: Asterids
- Order: Asterales
- Family: Asteraceae
- Genus: Olearia
- Species: O. muricata

Binomial name
- Olearia muricata (Steetz) Benth.

= Olearia muricata =

Species of shrub

Olearia muricata, commonly known as rough-leaved daisy bush, is a species of flowering plant in the family Asteraceae and is endemic to the south-west of Western Australia. It is an erect shrub with flat, linear to triangular leaves, and white or pale mauve and yellow, daisy-like inflorescences.

== Description ==
Olearia muricata is an erect shrub that typically grows up to 1 m (3 ft 3 in), its stems and leaves rough to the touch. The leaves are arranged alternately along the branchlets, flat, linear to triangular, 2–10 mm (0.079–0.394 in) long, 0.7–2 mm (0.028–0.079 in) wide and densely hairy on the lower surface. The heads or daisy-like "flowers" are arranged in panicles on the ends of branches on a peduncle up to 25 mm (0.98 in) long with a conical involucre at the base. Each head is 8–20 mm (0.31–0.79 in) in diameter and has eight to ten white or pale mauve ray florets, the ligule 4.4–6.0 mm (0.17–0.24 in) long, surrounding eleven to sixteen yellow disc florets. Flowering occurs throughout the year and the fruit is an achene, the pappus with 30 to 39 long and 5 to 20 short bristles.

== Taxonomy ==
Rough-leaved daisy bush was first formally described in 1845 by Joachim Steetz who gave it the name Eurybia muricata in Johann Georg Christian Lehmann's Plantae Preissianae, from specimens collected near Cape Riche in 1840. In 1867 George Bentham changed the name to Olearia muricata in Flora Australiensis. The specific epithet (muricata) means "rough, with short, hard points".

== Distribution and habitat ==
Olearia muricata grows in woodland, mallee shrubland and low heath in the Avon Wheatbelt, Coolgardie, Esperance Plains, Geraldton Sandplains, Jarrah Forest, Mallee, Warren bioregions of south-western Western Australia.

== Conservation status ==
Olearia mucronata is listed as "not threatened" by the Government of Western Australia Department of Biodiversity, Conservation and Attractions.
