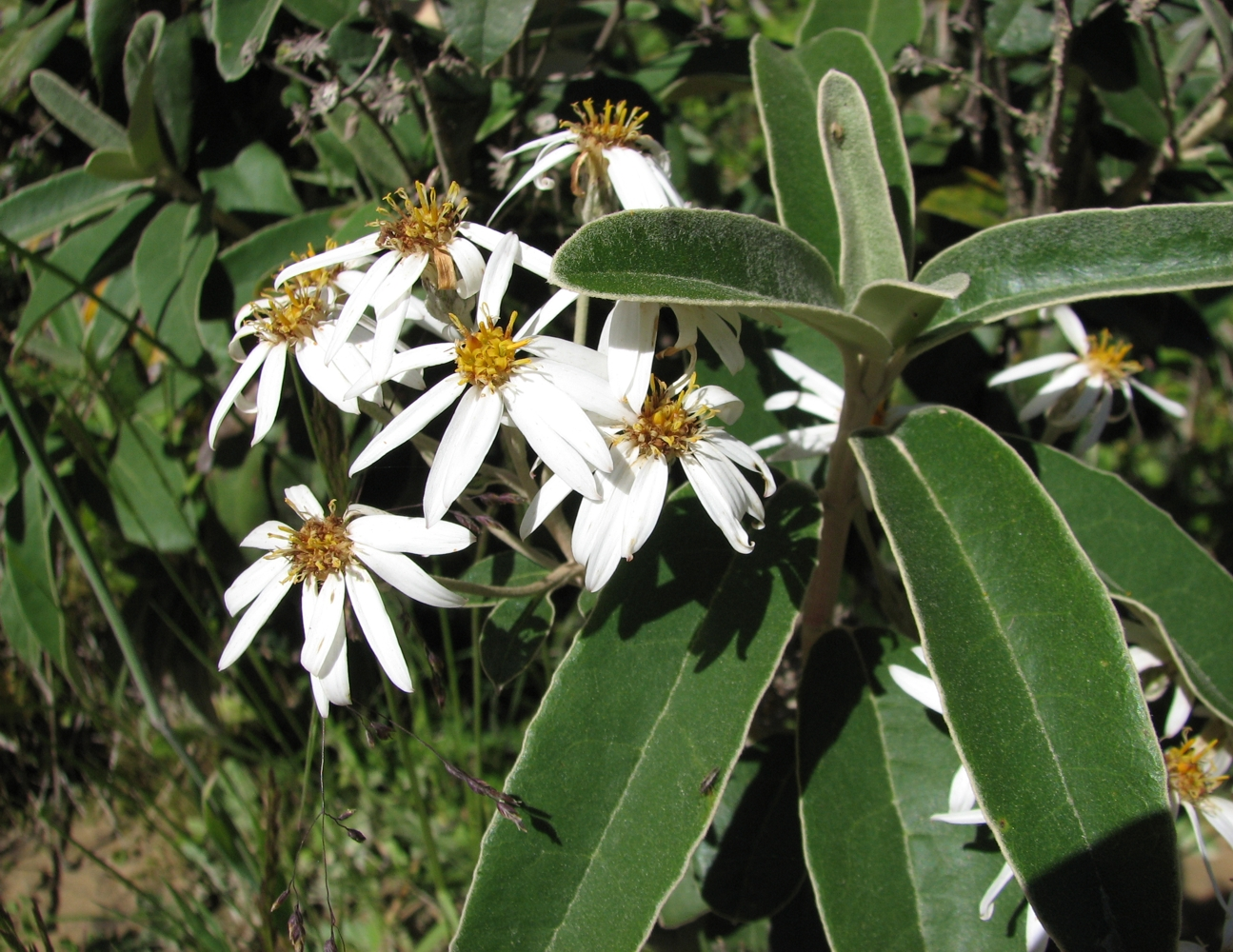

Scientific classification
- Kingdom: Plantae
- Clade: Tracheophytes
- Clade: Angiosperms
- Clade: Eudicots
- Clade: Asterids
- Order: Asterales
- Family: Asteraceae
- Genus: Olearia
- Species: O. megalophylla

Binomial name
- Olearia megalophylla (F.Muell.) F.Muell. ex Benth.

Synonyms
- Aster megalophyllus (F.Muell.) F.Muell.; Eurybia megalophylla F.Muell.

= Olearia megalophylla =

Species of shrub

Olearia megalophylla, commonly known as large-leaf daisy bush, is a species of flowering plant in the family Asteraceae and is endemic to south-eastern continental Australia. It is a spreading shrub with egg-shaped to elliptic leaves and white and yellow, daisy-like inflorescences.

== Description ==
Olearia megalophylla is a spreading shrub that typically grows to a height of up to 2 m (6 ft 7 in) and has its branchlets covered with felt-like, Y-shaped hairs. Its leaves are egg-shaped to elliptic, 20–130 mm (0.79–5.12 in) long and 6–35 mm (0.24–1.38 in) wide on a petiole up to 30 mm (1.2 in) long. The upper surface of the leaves is dark green and glabrous, the lower surface densely covered with hairs similar to those on the branchlets. The heads or daisy-like "flowers" are arranged in corymbs on the ends of branchlets and are 20–35 mm (0.79–1.38 in) in diameter on a peduncle 20–60 mm (0.79–2.36 in) long. Each head has five to nine white ray florets, the ligule 8–14 mm (0.31–0.55 in) long, surrounding nine to fourteen yellow disc florets. Flowering occurs from December to March and the fruit is a more or less glabrous achene, the pappus with 51 to 80 bristles in two rows.

== Taxonomy ==
This daisy bush was first formally described in 1860 by Ferdinand von Mueller who gave it the name Eurybia megalophylla in Papers and Prodeedings of the Royal Society of van Dieman's Land. In 1867, George Bentham changed the name to Olearia megalophylla in Flora Australiensis. The specific epithet (megalophylla) means "large-leaved".

== Distribution and habitat ==
Large-leaf daisy bush grows in forest and woodland on the slopes and tablelands of south from near Orange New South Wales to near Lake Mountain in eastern Victoria.
