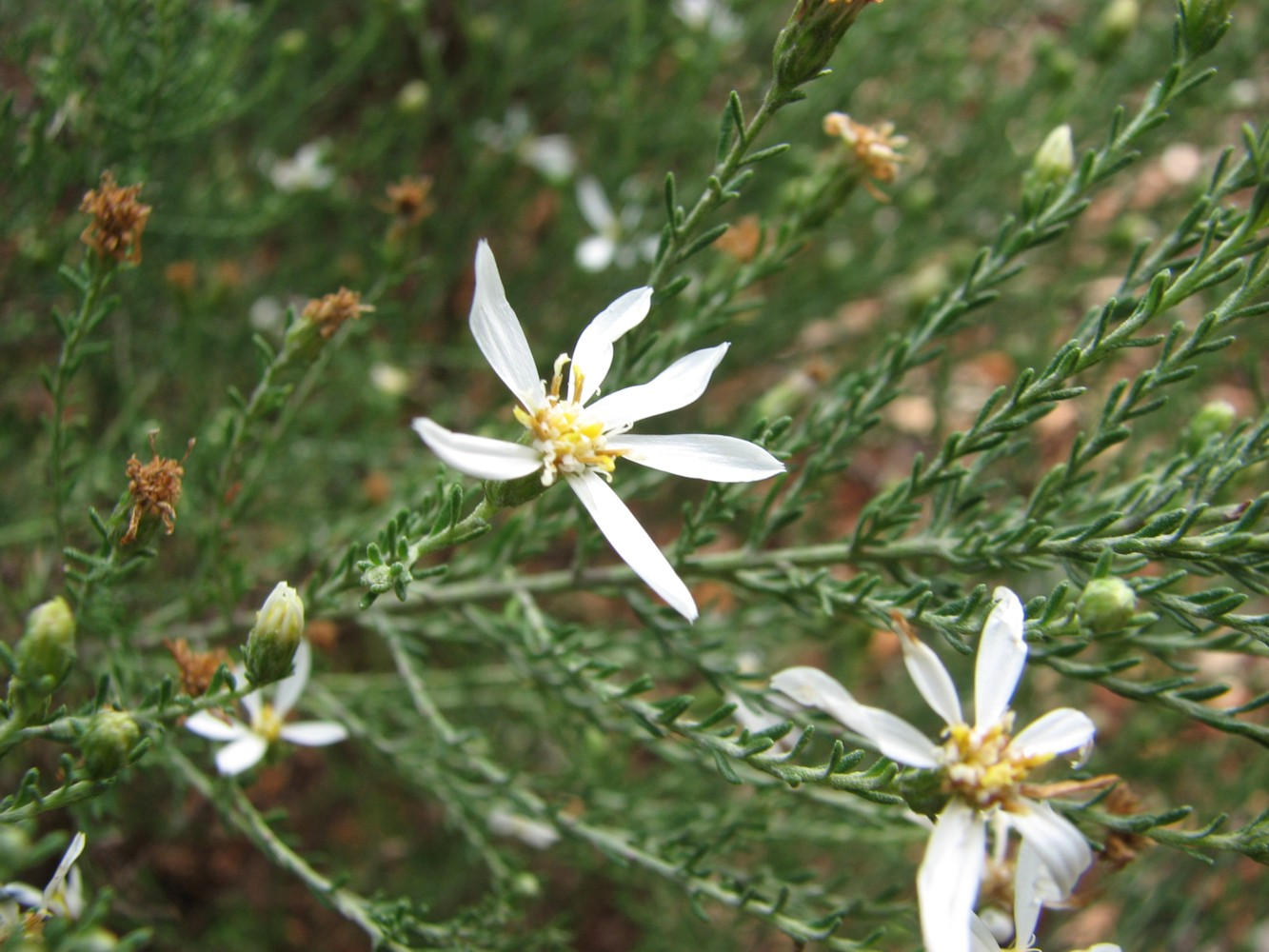

Scientific classification
- Kingdom: Plantae
- Clade: Tracheophytes
- Clade: Angiosperms
- Clade: Eudicots
- Clade: Asterids
- Order: Asterales
- Family: Asteraceae
- Genus: Olearia
- Species: O. floribunda

Binomial name
- Olearia floribunda (Hook.f.) Benth.

= Olearia floribunda =

Species of plant

Olearia floribunda, commonly known as heath daisy-bush, is a species of flowering plant in the family Asteraceae and is endemic to south-eastern Australia. It is an upright, spreading shrub with egg-shaped leaves and white and yellow or mauve, daisy-like inflorescences.

== Description ==
Olearia floribunda is a woody, upright spreading shrub 1–2 m (3 ft 3 in – 6 ft 7 in) high and thickly branched. The branches are smoothish to thickly covered in white, soft matted hairs without glands. The sessile leaves edges are slightly turned up, thickly spaced or clustered, egg-shaped 0.8–2.5 mm (0.031–0.098 in) long and narrow about 1 mm (0.039 in) wide. The leaves are mostly smooth above and either sparingly or thickly covered in soft hairs below with a prominent mid-vein and rolled edges. The sessile, single white "daisy" flowers are at the end of branches in clusters on short lateral stems and 8–13 mm (0.31–0.51 in) in diameter. The over-lapping bracts are arranged rows of 3 or 4, lance-shaped and ending with a point or rounded at the apex. The white to pale-pink "petals" (strictly ligules of the ray florets) are oblong shaped and 3–5 mm (0.12–0.20 in) long. The 2-8 disk florets are yellow or mauve. The dry one seeded fruit are needle shaped 1.5–2 mm (0.059–0.079 in) long and densely matted with short hairs. Flowers between July and February in the species' native range and intermittently during other months.

== Taxonomy ==
Heath daisy bush was first formally described in 1847 by Joseph Dalton Hooker who described it as Eurybia floribunda and published the description in the London Journal of Botany. In 1867 George Bentham changed the name to Olearia floribunda and published the description in Flora Australiensis. The specific epithet (floribunda) is derived from the Latin words floridus meaning "full of flowers" and abundus meaning "copious" and "abound".

== Distribution ==
The heath daisy-bush occurs in New South Wales in eucalypt woodland and around wetland areas south from West Wyalong. In South Australia grows in heath and shrubland mainly on sandy soils in coastal locations. This species is widespread in Victoria in a range of habitats from southern locations and as far north as Corryong areas at lower to subalpine altitudes. It also grows in wet places in Tasmania.
