= Landerolaria gordonii =

Scientific classification
- Kingdom: Plantae
- Clade: Tracheophytes
- Clade: Angiosperms
- Clade: Eudicots
- Clade: Asterids
- Order: Asterales
- Family: Asteraceae
- Genus: Landerolaria
- Species: L. gordonii

Binomial name
- Landerolaria gordonii (Lander) G.L.Nesom

Synonyms
- Olearia gordonii Lander

Species of shrub

Landeroalaria gordonii (synonym Olearia gordonii) is a species of flowering plant in the family Asteraceae which is endemic to inland southern Queensland. It is a small, erect, spreading shrub with linear leaves and blue, daisy-like inflorescences.

== Description ==
Landerolaria gordonii is a shrub that typically grows to a height of up to 60 cm (24 in). Its stems and leaves are covered with long, simple and glandular hairs. The leaves are arranged alternately along the branchlets, linear to narrowly elliptic, 10–75 mm (0.39–2.95 in) long and 2–8 mm (0.079–0.315 in) wide, the petiole winged and merged with the leaf blade. The heads or daisy-like "flowers" are arranged in loose groups on the ends of branchlets and are 20–30 mm (0.79–1.18 in) in diameter on a peduncle up to 80 mm (3.1 in) long. Each head has 13 to 33 ray florets, the ligule blue and 7–10 mm (0.28–0.39 in) long, surrounding 22 to 69 disc florets. Flowering occurs from January to July and the fruit is a flattened oval, light brown achene 2.7–4.0 mm (0.11–0.16 in) long, the pappus with 20 to 25 bristles.

== Taxonomy ==
The species was first formally described as Olearia gordonii by Nicholas Sèan Lander in 1989 in the journal Nuytsia from specimens collected on the Thomby Range between Glenmorgan and Surat by David Morrice Gordon. The specific epithet (gordonii) honours the collector of the type specimens. In 2020 Guy L. Nesom placed the species in the newly-described genus Landerolaria as L. gordonii after Olearia had been found to be polyphyletic.

== Distribution and habitat ==
Landerolaria gordonii grows in woodland dominated by bendee (Acacia catenulata) between Glenmorgan and Augathella in south-central Queensland.

== Conservation status ==
This daisy bush is listed as of "least concern" under the Queensland Government Nature Conservation Act 1992.
