= Neolaria mucronata =

Conservation status
- Priority Three — Poorly Known Taxa (DEC)

Scientific classification
- Kingdom: Plantae
- Clade: Tracheophytes
- Clade: Angiosperms
- Clade: Eudicots
- Clade: Asterids
- Order: Asterales
- Family: Asteraceae
- Genus: Neolaria
- Species: N. mucronata

Binomial name
- Neolaria mucronata (Lander) G.L.Nesom

Synonyms
- Olearia mucronata Lander

Species of shrub

Neolaria mucronata is a species of flowering plant in the family Asteraceae and is endemic to inland areas of Western Australia. It is a densely-branched, unpleasantly aromatic shrub with crowded linear leaves, and white and yellow, daisy-like inflorescences.

== Description ==
Neolaria mucronata is a densely-branched, unpleasantly aromatic shrub that typically grows up to 1 m (3 ft 3 in) high, its stems and leaves with a few glandular hairs. The leaves are arranged alternately, crowded along the branchlets, linear, mostly 13–46 mm (0.51–1.81 in) long and 1–5 mm (0.039–0.197 in) wide with a small point on the tip. Both sides of the leaves are dark green with a few glandular hairs. The heads or daisy-like "flowers" are arranged singly on the ends of branches on a peduncle up to 23 mm (0.91 in) long with a bell-shaped involucre at the base. Each head has nine to twelve white ray florets, the ligule 5.4–14 mm (0.21–0.55 in) long, surrounding 39 to 45 yellow disc florets. Flowering occurs from August to January and the fruit is a slightly flattened achene, the pappus with 19 to 27 bristles.

== Taxonomy ==
The species was first formally described as Olearia mucronata by Nicholas Sèan Lander in 1990 in the journal Nuytsia from specimens collected in the Wittenoom area in 1972. The specific epithet (mucronata) refers to the muconate leaves. In 2020 Guy L. Nesom placed the species in the newly-described genus Neolaria as N. mucronata after Olearia had been found to be polyphyletic.

== Distribution and habitat ==
This daisy bush grows on schistose hills in the Muchison and Pilbara bioregions of inland Western Australia.

== Conservation status ==
Neolaria mucronata is listed as "Priority Three" by the Government of Western Australia Department of Biodiversity, Conservation and Attractions, meaning that it is poorly known and known from only a few locations but is not under imminent threat.
