= Landerolaria eremaea =

Scientific classification
- Kingdom: Plantae
- Clade: Tracheophytes
- Clade: Angiosperms
- Clade: Eudicots
- Clade: Asterids
- Order: Asterales
- Family: Asteraceae
- Genus: Landerolaria
- Species: L. eremaea

Binomial name
- Landerolaria eremaea (Lander) G.L.Nesom

Synonyms
- Olearia eremaea Lander

Species of shrub

Landerolaria eremaea (synonym Olearia eremaea) is a species of flowering plant in the family Asteraceae and is endemic to inland areas of Western Australia. It is a shrub with scattered, more or less elliptic leaves, and white and yellow, daisy-like inflorescences.

== Description ==
Landerolaria eremaea is a shrub that typically grows to a height of up to 1.5 m (4 ft 11 in). Its stems and leaves are covered with minute glandular hairs. It has scattered, usually elliptic leaves arranged alternately along the branchlets, 6–16 mm (0.24–0.63 in) long and 2–5 mm (0.079–0.197 in) wide with toothed edges. Both surfaces of the leaves are sticky and densely covered with glandular hairs. The heads or daisy-like "flowers" are arranged singly on the ends of branchlets and are 15–40 mm (0.59–1.57 in) in diameter on a peduncle 18 mm (0.71 in) long. Each head has 13 to 22 white ray florets, the ligule 8.2–15.3 mm (0.32–0.60 in) long, surrounding 41 to 46 yellow disc florets. Flowering occurs in July and August and the fruit is a pale brown achene, the pappus with 16 to 25 long bristles and a smaller number of much shorter ones.

== Taxonomy ==
The species was first formally described as Olearia eremaea by Nicholas Sèan Lander in 1990 in the journal Nuytsia from specimens collected by Alex George near Cosmo Newbery in 1961. The specific epithet refers to the distribution of this species in the Eremaean Botanical Province of Western Australia. In 2020 Guy L. Nesom placed the species in the newly-described genus Landerolaria as L. eremaea after Olearia had been found to be polyphyletic.

== Distribution and habitat ==
Olearia eremaea grows in shrubland on stony soil in scattered places in the Gascoyne and Great Victoria Desert biogeographic regions of inland Western Australia.

== Conservation status ==
This daisy bush is listed as "not threatened" by the Department of Biodiversity, Conservation and Attractions.
