= Ephedrides =

Scientific classification
- Kingdom: Plantae
- Clade: Tracheophytes
- Clade: Angiosperms
- Clade: Eudicots
- Clade: Asterids
- Order: Asterales
- Family: Asteraceae
- Subfamily: Asteroideae
- Tribe: Astereae
- Subtribe: Brachyscominae
- Genus: Ephedrides; G.L.Nesom
- Species: E. trifurcata

Binomial name
- Ephedrides trifurcata (Lander) G.L.Nesom

Synonyms
- Olearia trifurcata Lander

Species of plant

Ephedrides is a monotypic genus of flowering plants in the family Asteraceae. It contains a single species, Ephedrides trifurcata (synonym Olearia trifurcata), which is endemic to the south of Western Australia. It is a dense, upright, tussock-like subshrub with narrowly triangular, grass-like leaves, and white and pale yellow, daisy-like inflorescences.

== Description ==
Ephedrides trifurcata is a dense, upright, tussock-like subshrub that typically grows up to 30 cm (12 in) high and 40 cm (16 in) wide and has sticky branchlets and leaves. Its leaves are narrowly triangular and grass-like, 1.2–8 mm (0.047–0.315 in) long and 0.8–1.0 mm (0.031–0.039 in) wide. The heads or daisy-like "flowers" are arranged on the ends of branches and are sessile with a narrowly conical or oval involucre at the base. Each head has 2 to 4 white ray florets, the ligule 4.8–5.0 mm (0.19–0.20 in) wide surrounding 3 pale yellow disc florets. Flowering occurs in January and February and the fruit is an achene 1.7–2.3 mm (0.067–0.091 in) long, the pappus with 40 to 52 bristles.

== Taxonomy ==
Olearia trifurcata was first described in 2008 by Nicholas Sèan Lander in the journal Nuytsia from specimens collected by William Archer near Esperance in 1990. The specific epithet (trifurcata) means "three-forked", referring to the branching habit of the subshrub. Olearia as then described was polyphyletic, and in 2020 Guy L. Nesom described the new monotypic genus Ephedrides to contain the species.

== Distribution and habitat ==
The species grows in low shrubland on the edges of salt lakes in the Avon Wheatbelt, Coolgardie and Mallee bioregions of southern Western Australia.

== Conservation status ==
Ephedrides trifurculata is listed as "not threatened" by the Government of Western Australia Department of Biodiversity, Conservation and Attractions.
