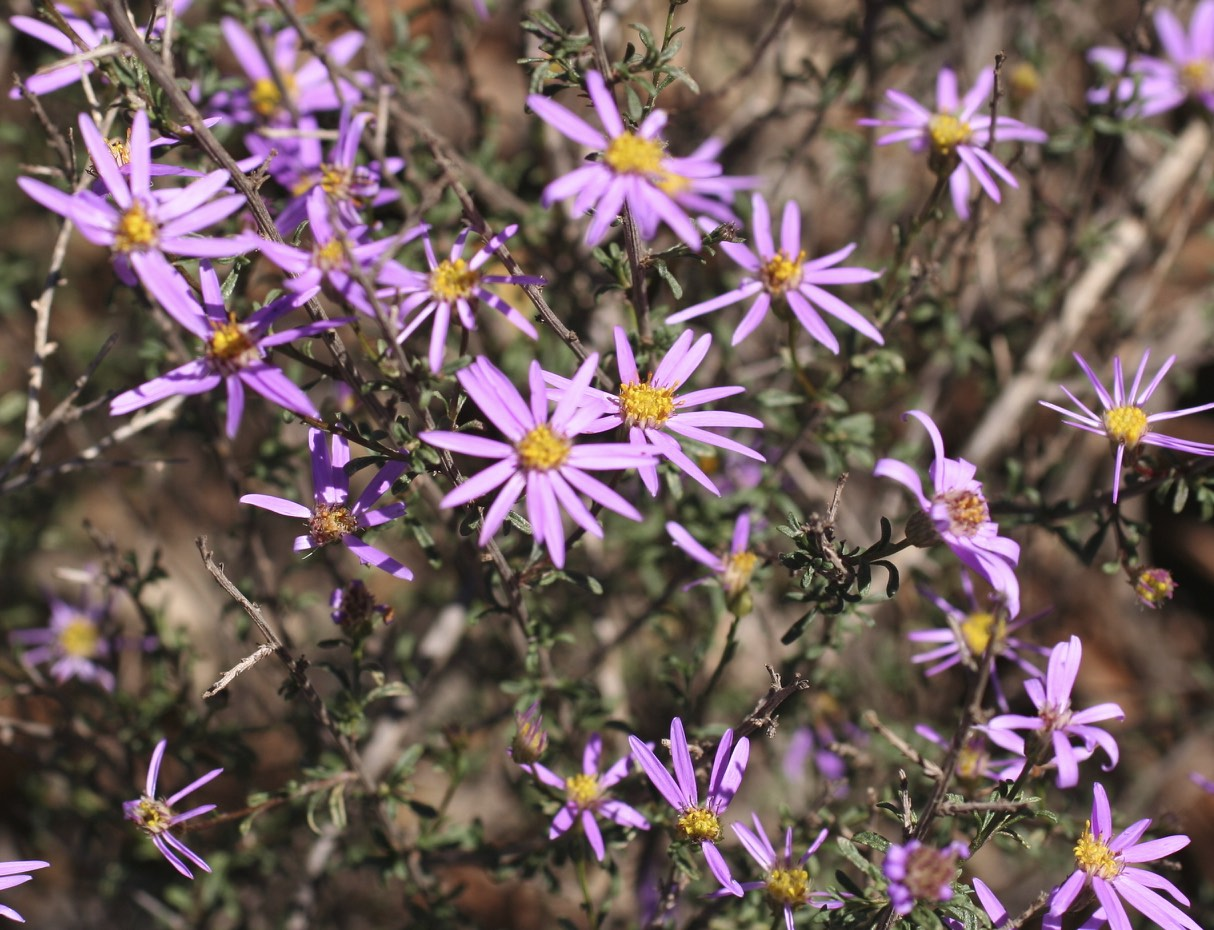
- Near Mullewa

Scientific classification
- Kingdom: Plantae
- Clade: Tracheophytes
- Clade: Angiosperms
- Clade: Eudicots
- Clade: Asterids
- Order: Asterales
- Family: Asteraceae
- Genus: Landerolaria
- Species: L. humilis

Binomial name
- Landerolaria humilis (Lander) G.L.Nesom

Synonyms
- Olearia humilis Lander

= Landerolaria humilis =

Species of shrub

Landerolaria humilis (synonym Olearia humilis) is a species of flowering plant in the family Asteraceae and is endemic to the south-west of Western Australia. It is an erect, spindly shrub with narrowly egg-shaped or linear leaves, and purple and yellow, daisy-like inflorescences.

== Description ==
Landerolaria humilis is an erect, spindly shrub that typically grows to a height of 0.4–1 m (1 ft 4 in – 3 ft 3 in). Its stems and leaves are covered with scattered thread-like and glandular hairs. The leaves are arranged alternately along the branchlets, narrowly egg-shaped with the narrower end towards the base or linear and often curved, 20–30 mm (0.79–1.18 in) long, 1–3 mm (0.039–0.118 in) wide and sessile. The heads or daisy-like "flowers" are arranged singly on the ends of branchlets and are 15–30 mm (0.59–1.18 in) in diameter on a peduncle up to 40 mm (1.6 in) long. Each head has twenty to thirty purple or bluish-purple ray florets, the ligule 9.6–14.2 mm (0.38–0.56 in) long, surrounding a similar number of yellow disc florets. Flowering occurs from July to November and the fruit is a flattened, light brown achene, the pappus with 21 to 33 bristles.

== Taxonomy ==
The species was first formally described as Olearia humilis by Nicholas Sèan Lander in 1989 in the journal Nuytsia from specimens collected by Philip Sydney Short, near the Sandstone-Paynes Find road in 1986. The specific epithet (humilis) means "low" or "small", referring to the stature of this species. In 2020 Guy L. Nesom placed the species in the newly-described genus Landerolaria as L. humilis after Olearia had been found to be polyphyletic.

== Distribution and habitat ==
Landerolaria humilis grows in shrubland and woodland in the Avon Wheatbelt, Coolgardie, Great Victoria Desert, Murchison and Yalgoo biogeographic regions of south-western Western Australia.

== Conservation status ==
This daisy bush is listed as "not threatened" by the Department of Biodiversity, Conservation and Attractions.
