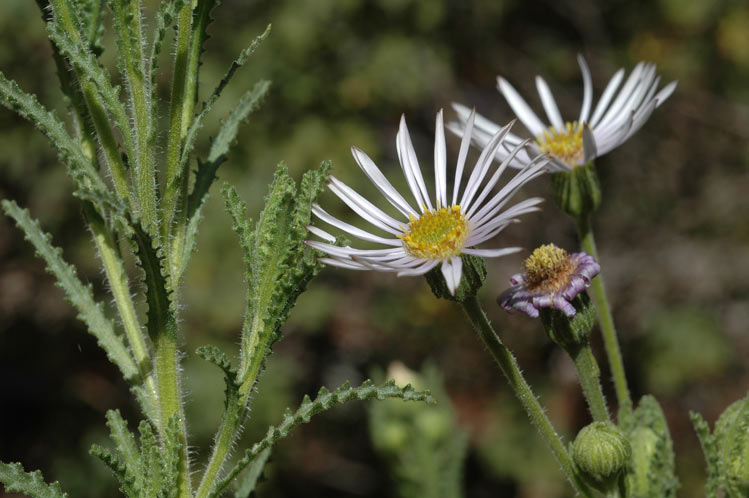
- In the Australian National Botanic Gardens

Conservation status
- Priority Two — Poorly Known Taxa (DEC)

Scientific classification
- Kingdom: Plantae
- Clade: Tracheophytes
- Clade: Angiosperms
- Clade: Eudicots
- Clade: Asterids
- Order: Asterales
- Family: Asteraceae
- Genus: Landerolaria
- Species: L. laciniifolia

Binomial name
- Landerolaria laciniifolia (Lander) G.L.Nesom

Synonyms
- Olearia laciniifolia Lander

= Landerolaria laciniifolia =

Species of shrub

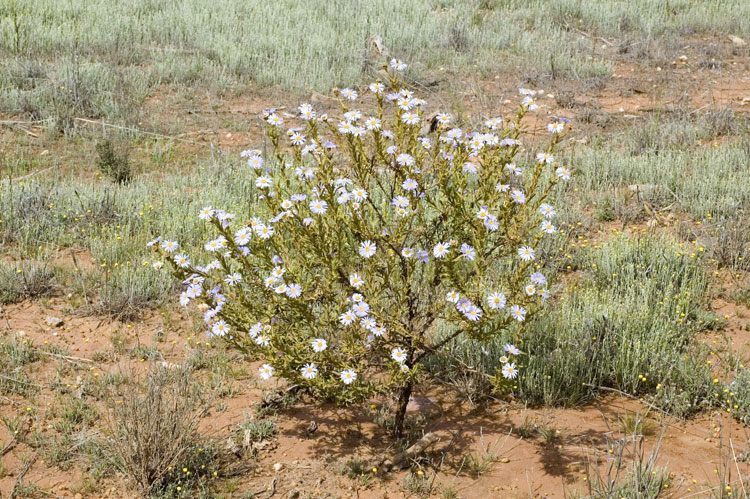
Habit near Hyden

Landerolaria laciniifolia (synonym Olearia laciniifolia) is a species of flowering plant in the family Asteraceae and is endemic to inland areas of south-west Western Australia. It is an erect shrub with scattered oblong leaves with small lobes on the edges, and lilac, white and yellow, daisy-like inflorescences.

== Description ==
Landerolaria laciniifolia is an erect shrub that typically grows to a height of up to 0.6–1.2 m (2 ft 0 in – 3 ft 11 in), its stems and leaves covered with simple and glandular hairs. The leaves are arranged alternately, scattered along the branchlets, oblong, 6–35 mm (0.24–1.38 in) long, 1–10 mm (0.039–0.394 in) wide and sessile. The edges of the leaves have small lobes on the edges and the base is wedge-shaped. The heads or daisy-like "flowers" are arranged singly on the ends of branches on a peduncle up to 25 mm (0.98 in) long. Each head is 26–35 mm (1.0–1.4 in) in diameter, with 35–43 lilac ray florets, the ligule 1.4–1.6 mm (0.055–0.063 in) long, surrounding 53 to 90 white and yellow disc florets. Flowering occurs from June to November and the fruit is a flattened, pale brown achene, the pappus with about twenty bristles.

== Taxonomy ==
The species was first formally described as Olearia laciniifolia by Nicholas Sèan Lander in 1990 in the journal Nuytsia from specimens collected by Arthur Robert Fairall, near the Newdegate-Lake Grace road in 1964. The specific epithet (laciniifolia) means "flap-leaved", referring to the narrowly lobed leaves. In 2020 Guy L. Nesom placed the species in the newly described genus Landerolaria as L. laciniifolia after Olearia had been found to be polyphyletic.

== Distribution and habitat ==
Landerolaria laciniifolia grows in mallee and shrubland around dry lakes in the Coolgardie and Mallee biogeographic regions of inland south-western Western Australia.

== Conservation status ==
This daisy bush is listed as "not threatened" by the Department of Biodiversity, Conservation and Attractions.
