= Landerolaria newbeyi =

Conservation status
- Priority One — Poorly Known Taxa (DEC)

Scientific classification
- Kingdom: Plantae
- Clade: Tracheophytes
- Clade: Angiosperms
- Clade: Eudicots
- Clade: Asterids
- Order: Asterales
- Family: Asteraceae
- Genus: Landerolaria
- Species: L. newbeyi

Binomial name
- Landerolaria newbeyi (Lander) G.L.Nesom

Synonyms
- Olearia newbeyi Lander

Species of shrub

Landerolaria newbeyi is a species of flowering plant in the family Asteraceae which is endemic to the south-west of Western Australia. It is a shrub with broadly linear to narrowly oblong leaves, and dull purple, daisy-like inflorescences.

== Description ==
Landerolaria newbeyi is a shrub that typically grows up to 30 cm (12 in) high and 30–35 cm (12–14 in) wide, its stems and leaves with a few glandular hairs. The leaves are crowded in bunches pressed against the stems, scattered along older stems, broadly linear to narrowly oblong, 2–12 mm (0.079–0.472 in) long and 0.8–4 mm (0.031–0.157 in) wide and sessile. Both sides of the leaves are medium green with a few glandular hairs and a heart-shaped base. The heads or daisy-like "flowers" are arranged in panicles on the ends of branches on a peduncle 2–20 mm (0.079–0.787 in) long and are 5–8 mm (0.20–0.31 in) in diameter with a cup-shaped involucre at the base. Each head has 76 to 85 dull purple ray florets, the ligule 1.5–2.0 mm (0.059–0.079 in) long, surrounding 6 to 11 disc florets. Flowering occurs in January and the fruit is an achene 0.6–1.1 mm (0.024–0.043 in) long, the pappus with eighteen to thirty barbed bristles.

== Taxonomy ==
The species was first formally described as Olearia newbeyi by Nicholas Sèan Lander in 2008 in the journal Nuytsia from specimens collected by Kenneth Newbey in 1985. The specific epithet (newbeyi) honours the collector of the type specimens. In 2020 Guy L. Nesom placed the species in the newly-described genus Landerolaria as L. newbeyi after Olearia had been found to be polyphyletic.

== Distribution and habitat ==
This daisy bush grows in shrubland on a disturbed roadside and is only known from a single collection in the Mallee bioregion of south-western Western Australia.

== Conservation status ==
Landerolaria newbeyi is listed as "Priority One" by the Government of Western Australia Department of Biodiversity, Conservation and Attractions, meaning that it is known from only one or a few locations which are potentially at risk.
