= Landerolaria =

Scientific classification
- Kingdom: Plantae
- Clade: Tracheophytes
- Clade: Angiosperms
- Clade: Eudicots
- Clade: Asterids
- Order: Asterales
- Family: Asteraceae
- Genus: Landerolaria; G.L.Nesom (2020)

Species
- 10; see text

Genus of flowering plants

Landerolaria is a genus of flowering plants in the sunflower family, Asteraceae. It includes ten species of aromatic shrubs endemic to Australia, native to the Northern Territory, Queensland, South Australia, Victoria, and Western Australia. Guy L. Nesom described the genus in 2020 to include species formerly placed in genus Olearia, which had been found to be polyphyletic. He named it for Australian botanist Nicholas Sèan Lander.

== Species ==
Ten species are accepted.

- Landerolaria arckaringensis (P.J.Lang) G.L.Nesom – South Australia
- Landerolaria eremaea (Lander) G.L.Nesom – Western Australia
- Landerolaria gordonii (Lander) G.L.Nesom – Queensland and South Australia
- Landerolaria humilis (Lander) G.L.Nesom – Western Australia
- Landerolaria laciniifolia (Lander) G.L.Nesom – southern Western Australia
- Landerolaria macdonnellensis (D.A.Cooke) G.L.Nesom – southern Northern Territory
- Landerolaria newbeyi (Lander) G.L.Nesom southern Western Australia
- Landerolaria orientalis (A.R.Bean & Jobson) G.L.Nesom – central-eastern Queensland
- Landerolaria stuartii (F.Muell.) G.L.Nesom – Northern Territory, Queensland, South Australia, and Western Australia
- Landerolaria xerophila (F.Muell.) G.L.Nesom – northwestern, central, and northeastern Australia (Northern Territory, Queensland, and Western Australia)
