= Acacia sibilans =

Whispering myall

Scientific classification
- Kingdom: Plantae
- Clade: Tracheophytes
- Clade: Angiosperms
- Clade: Eudicots
- Clade: Rosids
- Order: Fabales
- Family: Fabaceae
- Subfamily: Caesalpinioideae
- Clade: Mimosoid clade
- Genus: Acacia
- Species: A. sibilans

Binomial name
- Acacia sibilans Maslin
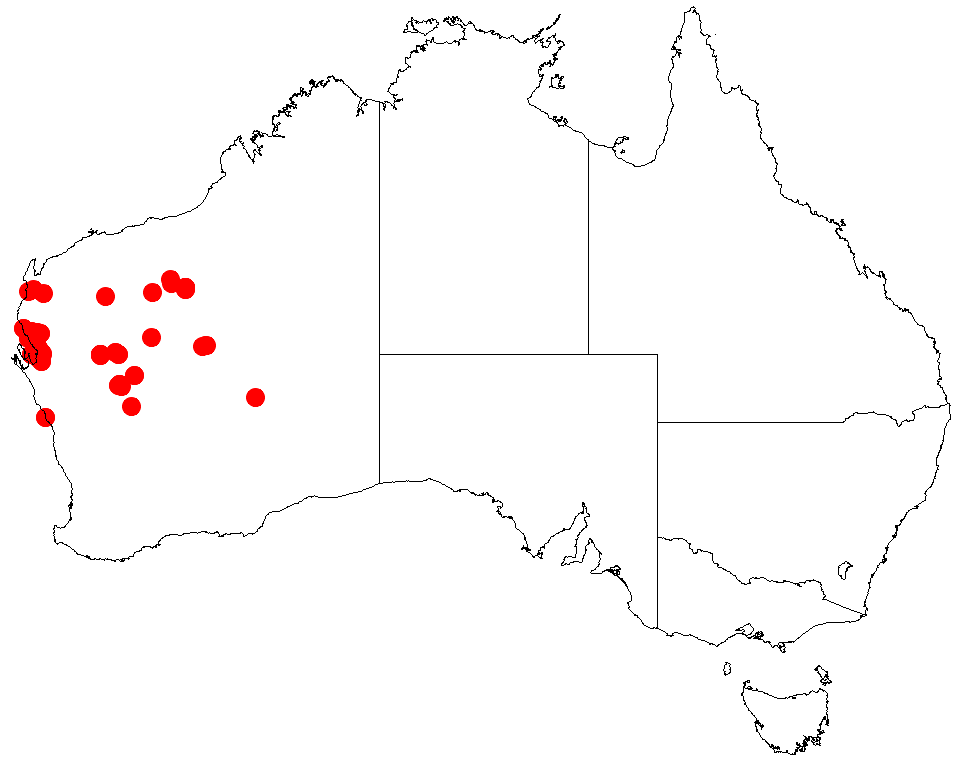
- Occurrence data from AVH

Species of legume

Acacia sibilans, commonly known as the whispering myall, is a shrub or tree of the genus Acacia and the subgenus Plurinerves thar is endemic to an arid areas of central western Australia.

== Description ==
The bushy shrub or tree typically grows to a height of 3 to 7.5 metres (10 to 25 ft) that sometimes can have a gnarled habit with fibrous and fissured bark. In some locations the trees can be as high as 12 m (39 ft) and have a crown with a width of up to 15 m (49 ft), usually with a single crooked or twisted trunk that branches close to ground level. The branchlets become glabrous with age and have hairy new shoots. Like most species of acacia it has phyllodes rather than true leaves. The cylindrical and filiform phyllodes are grey-green with a length of 8 to 18 cm (3.1 to 7.1 in) with a diameter of around 1 mm (0.039 in) and can be straight to slightly curved with many fine parallel longitudinal nerves. It flowers erratically with flowers being recorded January, April, May and October, it is thought flowering may follow heavy rain events. When it blooms it produces inflorescences found on short two or three headed racemes with spherical flower-heads containing 26 to 28 golden coloured flowers.

== Distribution ==
It is native to an area in the Mid West, Gascoyne, Pilbara and Goldfields-Esperance regions of Western Australia where it is commonly situated on alluvial flats growing in sandy of loamy soils often over or around limestone. The bulk of the population is found in the Gascoyne and in the upper catchment of the Murchison River with the range extending from Shark Bay in the west to around Mileura Station in the east. Other disjunct populations are found in the Pilbara from around Roy Hill Station and Ethel Creek Station. In the west the tree is usually a part of low chenopodiaceous shrubland communities but is eastern areas it more often part of scrublands featuring other species of Acacia including Acacia paraneura, Acacia xiphophylla and Acacia pruinocarpa or on flat spinifex plains.

== See also ==
- List of Acacia species
