= Olearia plucheacea =

Scientific classification
- Kingdom: Plantae
- Clade: Tracheophytes
- Clade: Angiosperms
- Clade: Eudicots
- Clade: Asterids
- Order: Asterales
- Family: Asteraceae
- Genus: Olearia
- Species: O. plucheacea

Binomial name
- Olearia plucheacea Lander

Species of shrub

Olearia plucheacea is a species of flowering plant in the family Asteraceae and is endemic to inland Western Australia. It is an erect, open shrub with scattered hairy, thread-like to linear leaves, and white and yellow daisy-like inflorescences.

== Description ==
Olearia plucheacea is an erect, open shrub that typically grows to a height of up to 1.5 m (4 ft 11 in), its stems and leaves covered with simple and glandular hairs. The leaves are arranged alternately, scattered along the branchlets, sticky, thread-like to narrowly linear, 12–45 mm (0.47–1.77 in) long and 1–5 mm (0.039–0.197 in) wide. The heads or daisy-like "flowers" are arranged in dense panicles on the ends of branches on a peduncle up to 35 mm (1.4 in) long, the leaves grading to the narrowly conical involucre at the base. Each head is 9.5–13.5 mm (0.37–0.53 in) in diameter with 5 to 7 white ray florets, the ligule 3.5–4.5 mm (0.14–0.18 in) long, surrounding 3 to 5 yellow disc florets. Flowering occurs from August to October and the fruit is an achene 1.7–2.4 mm (0.067–0.094 in) long, the pappus with 25 to 38 bristles.

== Taxonomy ==
Olearia plucheacea was first formally described in 1990 by Nicholas Sèan Lander in the journal Nuytsia. The specific epithet (plucheacea) means "resembling Pluchea".

== Distribution and habitat ==
This daisy bush grows on stony soil in woodland or shrubland in the Carnarvon, Gascoyne, Murchison and Pilbara bioregions of inland Western Australia.

== Conservation status ==
Olearia plucheacea is listed as "not threatened" by the Western Australian Government Department of Biodiversity, Conservation and Attractions.
