= Neolaria =

Scientific classification
- Kingdom: Plantae
- Clade: Tracheophytes
- Clade: Angiosperms
- Clade: Eudicots
- Clade: Asterids
- Order: Asterales
- Family: Asteraceae
- Subfamily: Asteroideae
- Tribe: Astereae
- Subtribe: Brachyscominae
- Genus: Neolaria; G.L.Nesom

Genus of flowering plants

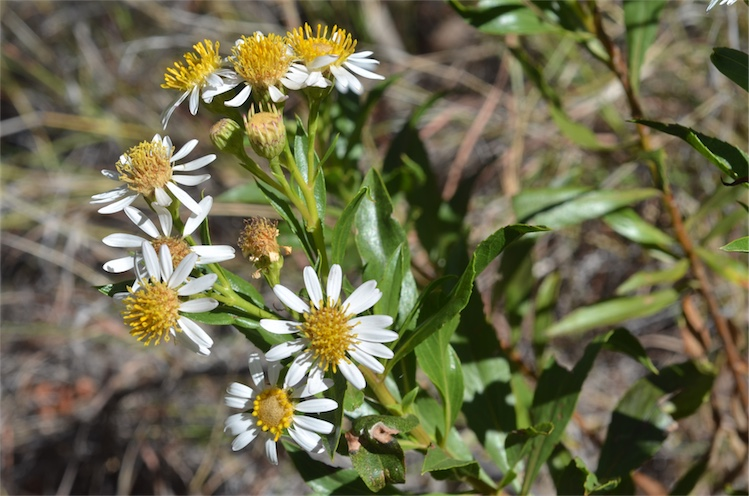
Olearia ferresii

Neolaria is a genus of flowering plants in the family Asteraceae. It includes three species native to Australia.

== Species ==
Three species are accepted.

- Neolaria bella (A.R.Bean & Jobson) G.L.Nesom
- Neolaria ferresii (F.Muell.) G.L.Nesom
- Neolaria mucronata (Lander) G.L.Nesom
