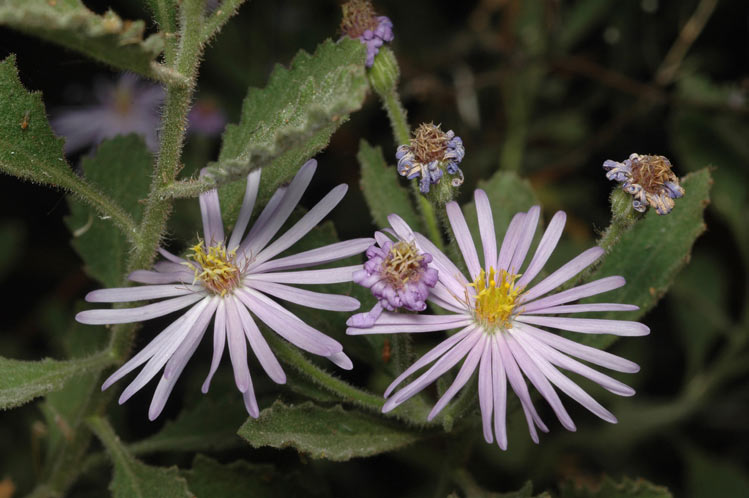

Scientific classification
- Kingdom: Plantae
- Clade: Tracheophytes
- Clade: Angiosperms
- Clade: Eudicots
- Clade: Asterids
- Order: Asterales
- Family: Asteraceae
- Genus: Landerolaria
- Species: L. xerophila

Binomial name
- Landerolaria xerophila (F.Muell.) G.L.Nesom

Synonyms
- Aster heynei F.Muell.; Aster xerophilus (F.Muell.) F.Muell.; Eurybia xerophila F.Muell.; Olearia xerophila (F.Muell.) F.Muell. ex Benth.

= Landerolaria xerophila =

Species of plant

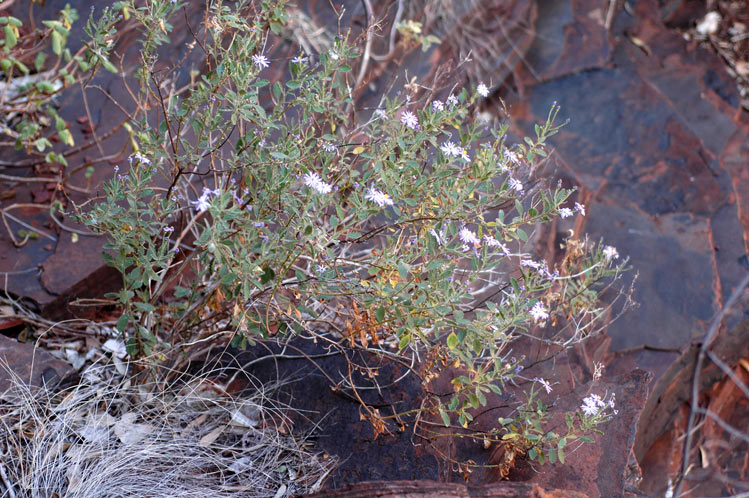
Habit in Karijini National Park

Landerolaria xerophila (synonym Olearia xerophila) is a species of flowering plant in the family Asteraceae which is endemic northern Australia. It is an erect subshrub with elliptic to broadly elliptic leaves and violet, blue or mauve and yellow, daisy-like inflorescences.

== Description ==
Landerolaria xerophila is an erect, sticky subshrub that typically grows to a height of up to 1 m (3 ft 3 in), and has reddish or yellowish-brown stems when young. Its leaves are elliptic to broadly elliptic, 25–65 mm (0.98–2.56 in) long and 7–22 mm (0.28–0.87 in) wide on a petiole 5–18 mm (0.20–0.71 in) long with irregular serrations on the edges. The heads or daisy-like "flowers" are arranged in corymbs on a peduncle up to 70 mm (2.8 in) long, each head 20–30 mm (0.79–1.18 in) in diameter with a broadly top-shaped to hemispherical involucre at the base. Each head has 20 to 50 violet, blue or mauve ray florets, the ligule 7.5–12 mm (0.30–0.47 in) long, surrounding 25 to 52 yellow disc florets. Flowering mainly occurs from June to September and the fruit is a flattened oval achene 2.0–2.2 mm (0.079–0.087 in) long, the pappus with 20 to 30 bristles.

== Taxonomy ==
This daisy was first formally described in 1858 by Ferdinand von Mueller who gave it the name Eurybia xerophila in Fragmenta Phytographiae Australiae from specimens collected near the Burdekin River. The specific epithet (xerophila) means "dry-loving". In 1867 George Bentham changed the name to Olearia xerophila in Flora Australiensis. In 2020 Guy L. Nesom placed the species in the newly described genus Landerolaria as L. xerophila after Olearia had been found to be polyphyletic.

== Distribution and habitat ==
Landerolaria xerophila grows in shrubland or woodland in crevices on rocky hills, scree slopes, gorges or creek beds in the Gascoyne, Murchison and Pilbara bioregions of Western Australia and in northern Queensland.
