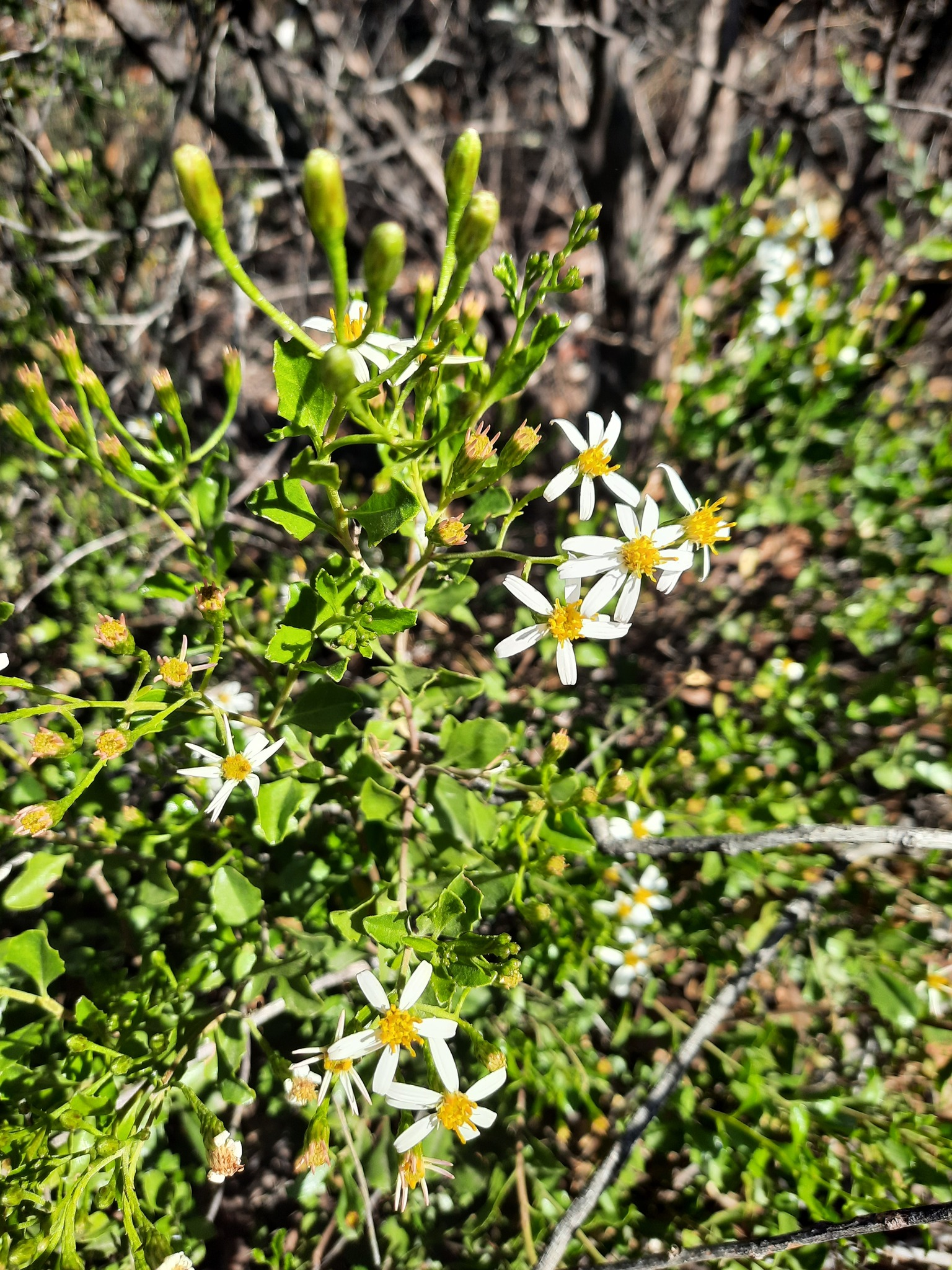

Conservation status
- Vulnerable (EPBC Act)

Scientific classification
- Kingdom: Plantae
- Clade: Tracheophytes
- Clade: Angiosperms
- Clade: Eudicots
- Clade: Asterids
- Order: Asterales
- Family: Asteraceae
- Genus: Landerolaria
- Species: L. macdonnellensis

Binomial name
- Landerolaria macdonnellensis (D.A.Cooke) G.L.Nesom

Synonyms
- Olearia macdonnellensis D.A.Cooke

= Landerolaria macdonnellensis =

Species of flowering plant

Landerolaria macdonnellensis is a species of flowering plant in the family Asteraceae which is endemic to a restricted part of the Northern Territory of Australia. It is an erect, bushy shrub with broadly elliptic to broadly egg-shaped leaves and yellow, or white and yellow, daisy-like inflorescences.

== Description ==
Landerolaria macdonnellensis is an erect, bushy shrub that typically grows to a height of up to 1.2 m (3 ft 11 in) and has angular stems and hairy young branchlets. Its leaves are arranged alternately along the branchlets, broadly elliptic to broadly egg-shaped, 17–27 mm (0.67–1.06 in) long and 8–15 mm (0.31–0.59 in) wide on a petiole 2–6 mm (0.079–0.236 in) long and with a few small teeth on the edges. The heads or daisy-like "flowers" are arranged in clusters of two to five on the ends of branchlets on a peduncle 7.5–24 mm (0.30–0.94 in) long, each head 30–35 mm (1.2–1.4 in) wide with six to eight white or yellow ray florets, the ligule 7–11 mm (0.28–0.43 in) long, surrounding fifteen to twenty yellow disc florets. Flowering occurs from May to October and the fruit is a hairy achene, the pappus with 20 to 32 bristles.

== Taxonomy ==
The species was first formally described as Olearia macdonnellensis by David Alan Cooke in 1986 in the journal Muelleria from specimens collected by Peter Latz in 1983 near the "Ellery Creek Big Hole". In 2020 Guy L. Nesom placed the species in the newly-described genus Landerolaria as L. macdonnellensis after Olearia had been found to be polyphyletic.

== Distribution and habitat ==
This daisy bush grows in low woodland on rocky scree slopes or gullies and is restricted to the western part of the MacDonnell Ranges in the south of the Northern Territory.

== Conservation status ==
Landerolaria macdonnellensis is listed as "vulnerable" under the Australian Government Environment Protection and Biodiversity Conservation Act 1999 and as "endangered" under the Northern Territory Government Territory Parks and Wildlife Conservation Act 1976. The main threats to the species are inappropriate fire regimes and weed invasion.
