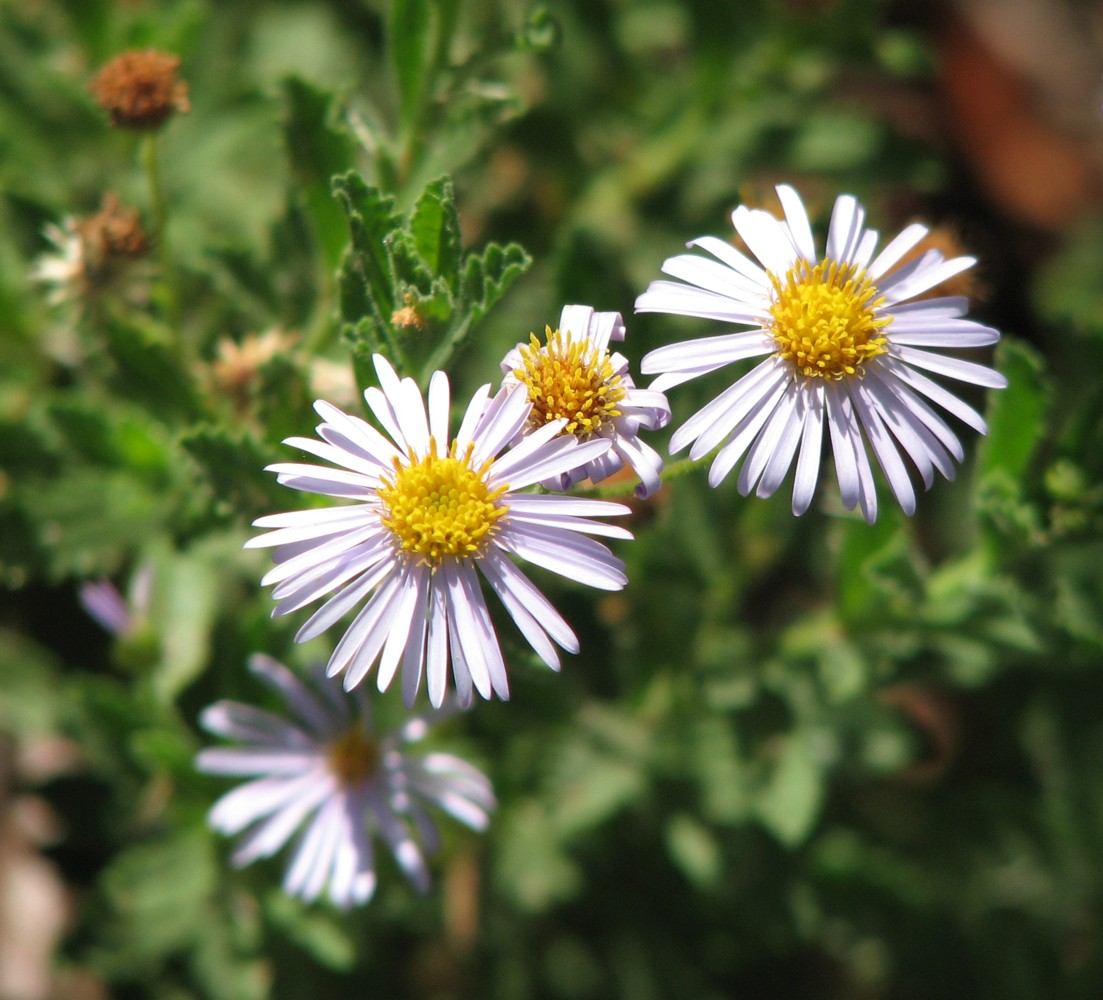

Scientific classification
- Kingdom: Plantae
- Clade: Tracheophytes
- Clade: Angiosperms
- Clade: Eudicots
- Clade: Asterids
- Order: Asterales
- Family: Asteraceae
- Genus: Landerolaria
- Species: L. stuartii

Binomial name
- Landerolaria stuartii (F.Muell.) G.L.Nesom

Synonyms
- Aster megalodontus F.Muell.; Aster stuartii (F.Muell.) F.Muell.; Eurybia stuartii F.Muell.; Olearia stuartii (F.Muell.) F.Muell. ex Benth.

= Landerolaria stuartii =

Species of plant

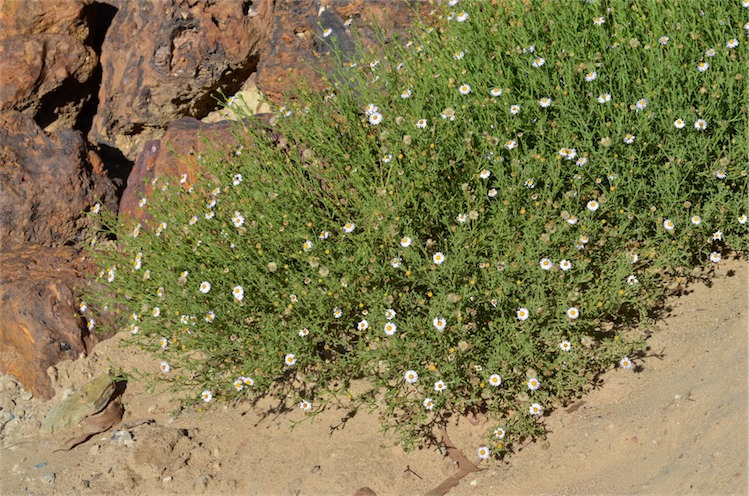
Habit in the Australian National Botanic Gardens

Landerolaria stuartii (synonym Olearia stuartii) is a species of flowering plant in the family Asteraceae which is endemic to arid parts of inland Australia. It is compact, spreading shrub or undershrub with lance-shaped leaves and blue to mauve and yellow, daisy-like inflorescences.

== Description ==
Landerolaria stuartii is a compact, sticky, spreading shrub or subshrub that typically grows to a height of 0.25–1.0 m (9.8 in – 3 ft 3.4 in), the stems woody and covered with soft hairs. Its leaves are lance-shaped with the narrower end towards the base, mostly 4–28 mm (0.16–1.10 in) long, 2–6 mm (0.079–0.236 in) wide and sessile with 2 to 5 pairs of lobes on the edges. The heads or daisy-like "flowers" are arranged singly or in groups of up to four on the ends of branches and are pedunculate with a hemispherical involucre 5–6 mm (0.20–0.24 in) long at the base. Each head has 20 to 50 blue to mauve ray florets, the ligule 6–10 mm (0.24–0.39 in) long, surrounding 30 to 70 yellow disc florets. Flowering occurs from June to September and the fruit is a flattened achene about 3 mm (0.12 in) long, the pappus with 20 to 30 bristles 4–5 mm (0.16–0.20 in) long.

== Taxonomy ==
This daisy was first formally described in 1859 by Ferdinand von Mueller who gave it the name Eurybia stuartii in Fragmenta Phytographiae Australiae from specimens collected in western inland South Australia by John McDouall Stuart. The specific epithet (stuartii) honours the collector of the type specimens. In 1867 George Bentham changed the name to Olearia stuartii in Flora Australiensis. In 2020 Guy L. Nesom placed the species in the newly-described genus Landerolaria as L. stuartii after Olearia had been found to be polyphyletic.

== Distribution and habitat ==
Landerolaria stuartii grows in woodland on rocky hills, on ranges, near cliffs and rocky creek beds in inland Western Australia, the south of the Northern Territory, the north-west of South Australia and inland Queensland.
