= Olearia aglossa =

Scientific classification
- Kingdom: Plantae
- Clade: Tracheophytes
- Clade: Angiosperms
- Clade: Eudicots
- Clade: Asterids
- Order: Asterales
- Family: Asteraceae
- Genus: Olearia
- Species: O. aglossa

Binomial name
- Olearia aglossa (Betche & Maiden) Lander

Species of shrub

Olearia aglossa, is a shrub in the family Asteraceae and is found in mountainous terrain in New South Wales and Victoria in Australia. It is a small shrub with spreading upright branches and white daisy-like flowers.

== Description ==
Olearia aglossa is a shrub to about 2.5 m (8.2 ft) high. The ascending branchlets are light brown becoming grey and thickly covered with soft very small T-shaped hairs. Leaves are arranged opposite, are narrow to egg-shaped, 24–90 mm (0.94–3.5 in) long and 8–27 mm (0.31–1.1 in) wide. The leaf upper surface is dark green, flat, smooth and ending in a point. The leaf underside is grey or brownish in colour and densely covered with short, soft, matted hairs. The leaves have a leathery texture, with an obscure network of veins and the margin slightly rolled under. The leaf stalk about 12 mm (0.47 in) long. The flower head is 4–20 mm (0.16–0.79 in) in diameter. The inflorescence is on a stalk up to 25 mm (0.98 in) long. The bracts are narrow, cone shaped 4.5–5.5 mm (0.18–0.22 in) long, 4-6 arranged in rows and covered with dense flat hairs, occasionally fringed. The white flower petals are about 4.4–10 mm (0.17–0.39 in) long with 4 flowers in each cluster. The floret centres are yellow. The fruit is dry, narrowly egg-shaped, one seeded, 1.3–2 mm (0.051–0.079 in) long. The white flowers appear from December to February.

== Taxonomy and naming ==
This daisy bush was first formally described in 1899 by Ernst Betche and Joseph Maiden who gave it the name Olearia alpicola var. aglossa in Proceedings of the Linnean Society of New South Wales from specimens collected by William Baeuerlen near Jindabyne in 1890. In 1991 Nicholas Lander raised the variety to species status as Olearia aglossa. The specific epithet (aglossa) is derived from the Ancient Greek word glossa meaning "tongue" with the prefix "a-" meaning "not" or "without", referring to the absence of a distinct ligule on the marginal florets.

== Distribution and habitat ==
This species in found in the Southern Tablelands, south from the Kosciuszko National Park in New South Wales and is a rare species in the Victorian Alps. It grows in mountainous locations in dry sclerophyll forest.
