= Olearia burgessii =

Scientific classification
- Kingdom: Plantae
- Clade: Tracheophytes
- Clade: Angiosperms
- Clade: Eudicots
- Clade: Asterids
- Order: Asterales
- Family: Asteraceae
- Genus: Olearia
- Species: O. burgessii

Binomial name
- Olearia burgessii Lander

Species of shrub

Olearia burgessii is a species of flowering plant in the family Asteraceae and is endemic to south-eastern New South Wales. It is a shrub with scattered elliptic to egg-shaped leaves with the narrower end towards the base, and white and yellow, daisy-like inflorescences.

== Description ==
Olearia burgessii is a shrub that typically grows to a height of up to 1.8 m (5 ft 11 in). It has scattered elliptic to egg-shaped leaves with the narrower end towards the base, 3–13 mm (0.12–0.51 in) long and 1–4 mm (0.039–0.157 in) wide. The upper surface of the leaves is glabrous and the lower surface is covered with woolly, greyish hairs. The heads are arranged on the ends of branchlets and are 10–16 mm (0.39–0.63 in) in diameter on a peduncle up to 12 mm (0.47 in) long. Each head or daisy-like "flower" has a bell-shaped involucre 2.2–4.0 mm (0.087–0.157 in) wide at the base, and eight to eleven ray florets, the petal-like ligule white and 4.0–5.8 mm (0.16–0.23 in) long surrounding six to ten yellow disc florets. Flowering occurs from July to November and the fruit is a silky-hairy achene, the pappus with 26 to 40 long bristles.

== Taxonomy ==
Olearia burgessii was first formally described in 1991 by Nicholas Sean Lander in the journal Telopea based on plant material collected by the Rev. Colin Ernest Bryce Hawthorn Burgess near Thirlmere in 1959. The specific epithet (burgessii) honours the collector of the type specimens.

== Distribution and habitat ==
This daisy-bush grows in forest mainly in the Burragorang-Picton area and near Tumbarumba, in south-eastern New South Wales.
