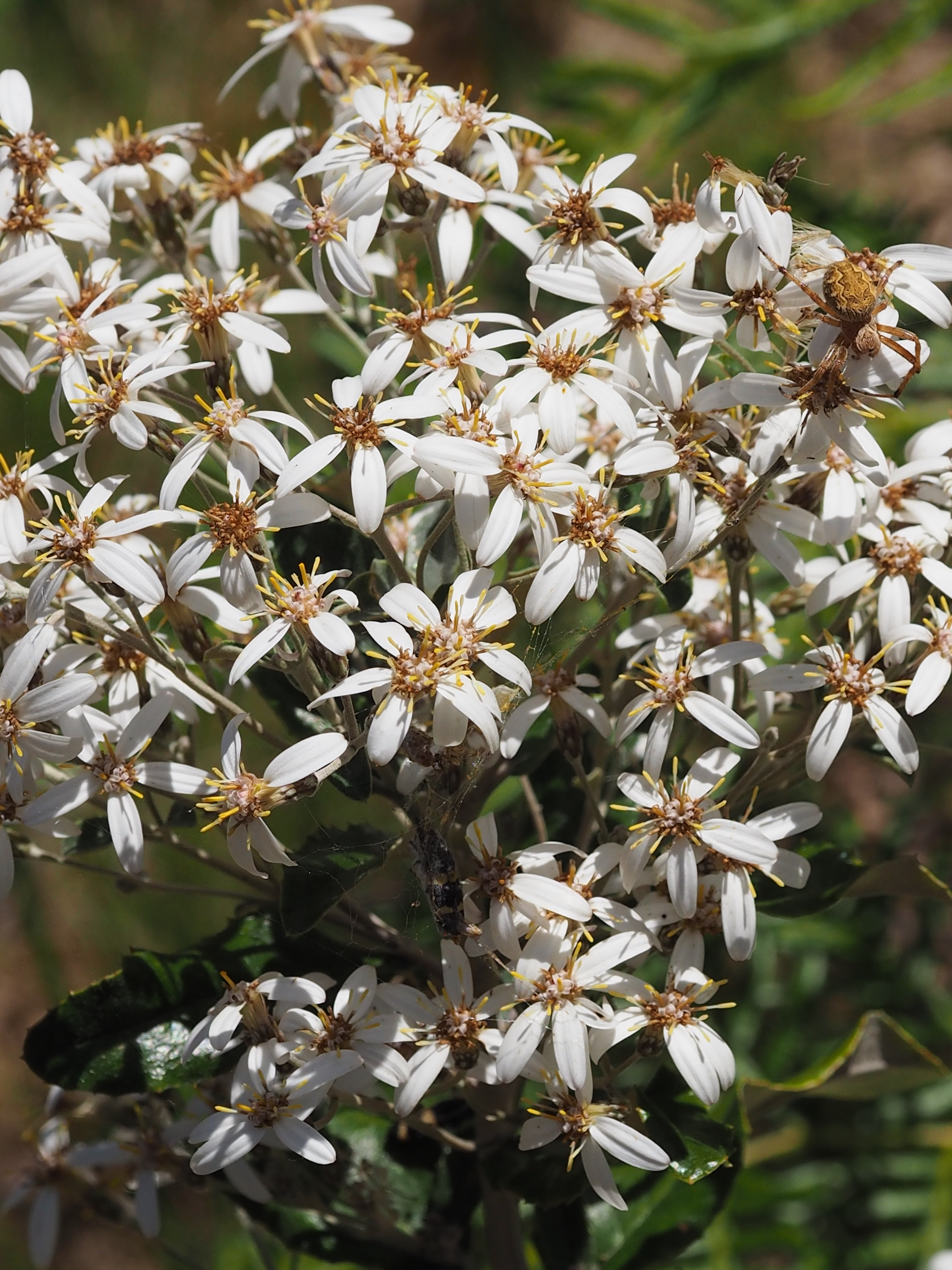
- Near Cathedral Rock National Park

Scientific classification
- Kingdom: Plantae
- Clade: Tracheophytes
- Clade: Angiosperms
- Clade: Eudicots
- Clade: Asterids
- Order: Asterales
- Family: Asteraceae
- Genus: Olearia
- Species: O. oppositifolia

Binomial name
- Olearia oppositifolia (F.Muell.) Lander

Synonyms
- List: Aster oppositifolius (F.Muell.) F.Muell. nom. illeg.; Eurybia oppositifolia F.Muell.; Aster chrysophyllus auct. non (DC.) A.Cunn. ex C.Moore: Moore, C. & Betche, E. (1893) p.p.; Olearia chrysophylla auct. non (DC.) Benth.: Bentham, G. (1867) p.p.; Olearia chrysophylla auct. non (DC.) Benth.: Moore, C. (1884) p.p.; Olearia chrysophylla auct. non (DC.) Benth.: Maiden, J.H. & Betche, E. (1916) p.p.

= Olearia oppositifolia =

Species of shrub

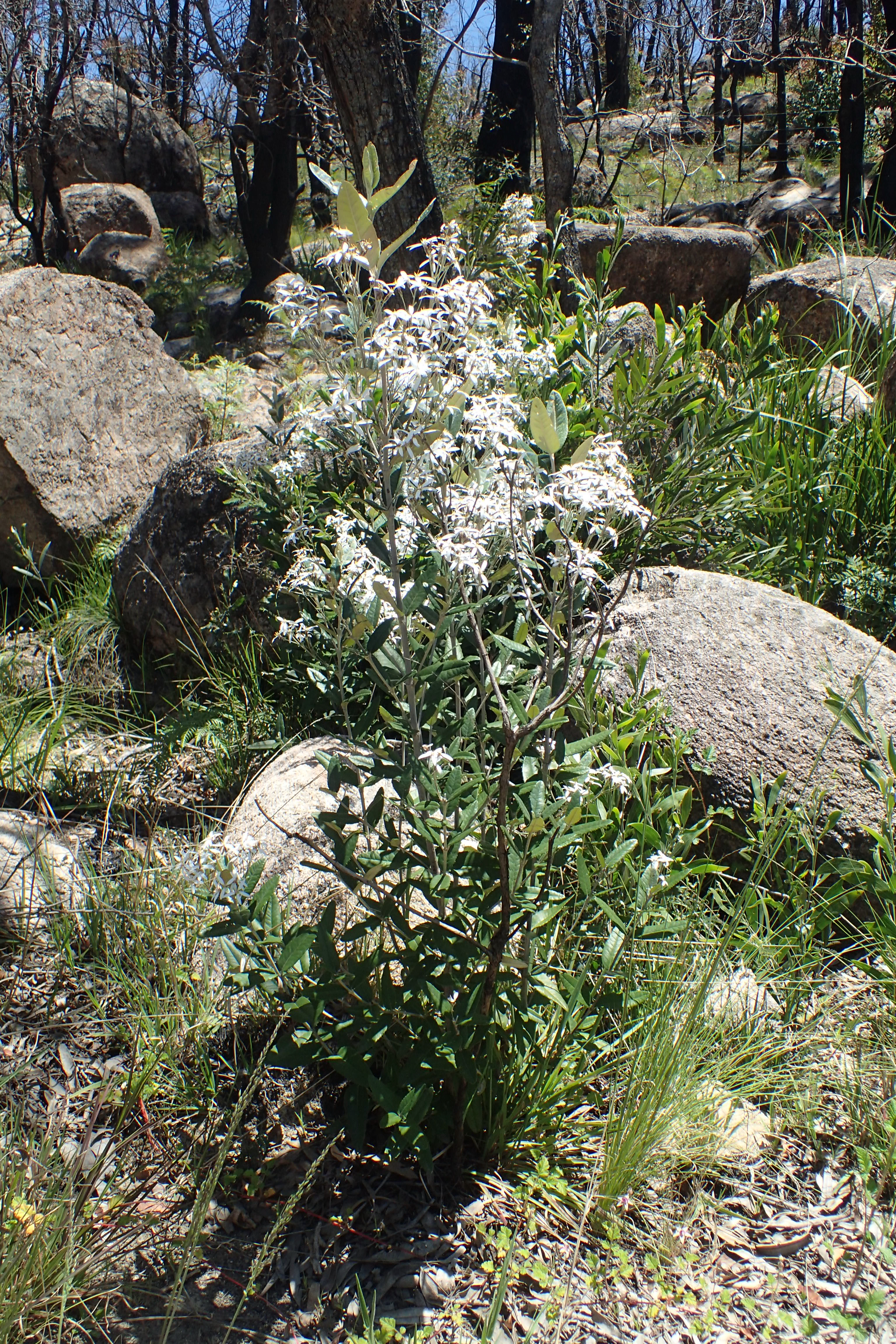
Habit

Olearia oppositifolia is a species of flowering plant in the family Asteraceae and is endemic to eastern Australia. It is a shrub with egg-shaped to elliptic leaves arranged in opposite pairs, and white and yellow daisy flowers.

== Description ==
Olearia oppositifolia is a shrub with erect stems that typically grows to a height of up to 2.3 m (7 ft 7 in). The leaves are mostly arranged in opposite pairs, egg-shaped to elliptic, 14–110 mm (0.55–4.33 in) long and 6–39 mm (0.24–1.54 in) wide, green on the upper surface and pale brown, covered with greyish hairs on the lower surface. The heads or daisy-like "flowers" are arranged in corymbs 19–23 mm (0.75–0.91 in) wide on a peduncle up to 50 mm (2.0 in) long near the ends of branches. Each head has four to six white ray florets and six to eleven yellow disc florets. Flowering occurs from November to January and the achenes are more or less glabrous, the pappus with 44 to 74 bristles.

== Taxonomy and naming ==
This olearia was first formally described in 1860 by Ferdinand von Mueller in Fragmenta phytographiae Australiae and given the name Eurybia oppositifolia. In 1991, Nicholas Lander changed the name to Olearia oppositifolia in the journal Telopea.

== Distribution and habitat ==
Olearia oppositifolia grows in forest and rainforest margins on the ranges between the Border Ranges National Park in south-eastern Queensland and Barrington Tops National Park.
