= Landerolaria orientalis =

Scientific classification
- Kingdom: Plantae
- Clade: Tracheophytes
- Clade: Angiosperms
- Clade: Eudicots
- Clade: Asterids
- Order: Asterales
- Family: Asteraceae
- Genus: Landerolaria
- Species: L. orientalis

Binomial name
- Landerolaria orientalis (A.R.Bean & Jobson) G.L.Nesom

Synonyms
- Olearia orientalis A.R.Bean & Jobson

Species of shrub

Landerolaria orientalis (synonym Olearia orientalis) is a species of flowering plant in the family Asteraceae and is endemic to central eastern Queensland. It is a bushy shrub with egg-shaped leaves, the narrower end towards the base, and white and yellow daisy flowers.

== Description ==
Landerolaria orientalis is a bushy shrub that typically grows to a height of 0.5–2 m (1 ft 8 in – 6 ft 7 in), its young branchlets often sticky. The leaves are alternately along the branchlets, egg-shaped with the narrower end towards the base, 18–37 mm (0.71–1.46 in) long and 9–14 mm (0.35–0.55 in) wide with two to four pairs of teeth on the edges. The heads or daisy-like "flowers" are arranged singly on the ends of branchlets and are 8–11 mm (0.31–0.43 in) wide on a peduncle 12–55 mm (0.47–2.17 in) long. Each head has 14 to 20 white ray florets, the ligules 3–6 mm (0.12–0.24 in) long, surrounding 16 to 26 yellow disc florets. Flowering occurs in most months and the achenes are flattened, 2.0–2.8 mm (0.079–0.110 in) long, the pappus with 31 to 40 bristles in two rows.

== Taxonomy and naming ==
The species was first formally described as Olearia orientalis by Anthony Bean and Peter Craig Jobson in 2017 in the journal Austrobaileya from specimens collected in the Port Curtis district in 1994. The specific epithet (orientalis) means "eastern", referring to the distribution of this species. In 2020 Guy L. Nesom placed the species in the newly-described genus Landerolaria as L. orientalis after Olearia had been found to be polyphyletic.

== Distribution and habitat ==
This olearia grows in woodland on serpentinite hills and ridges near Rockhampton in eastern Queensland.

== Conservation status ==
Olearia orietalis is listed as "endangered" under the Queensland Government Nature Conservation Act 1992.
