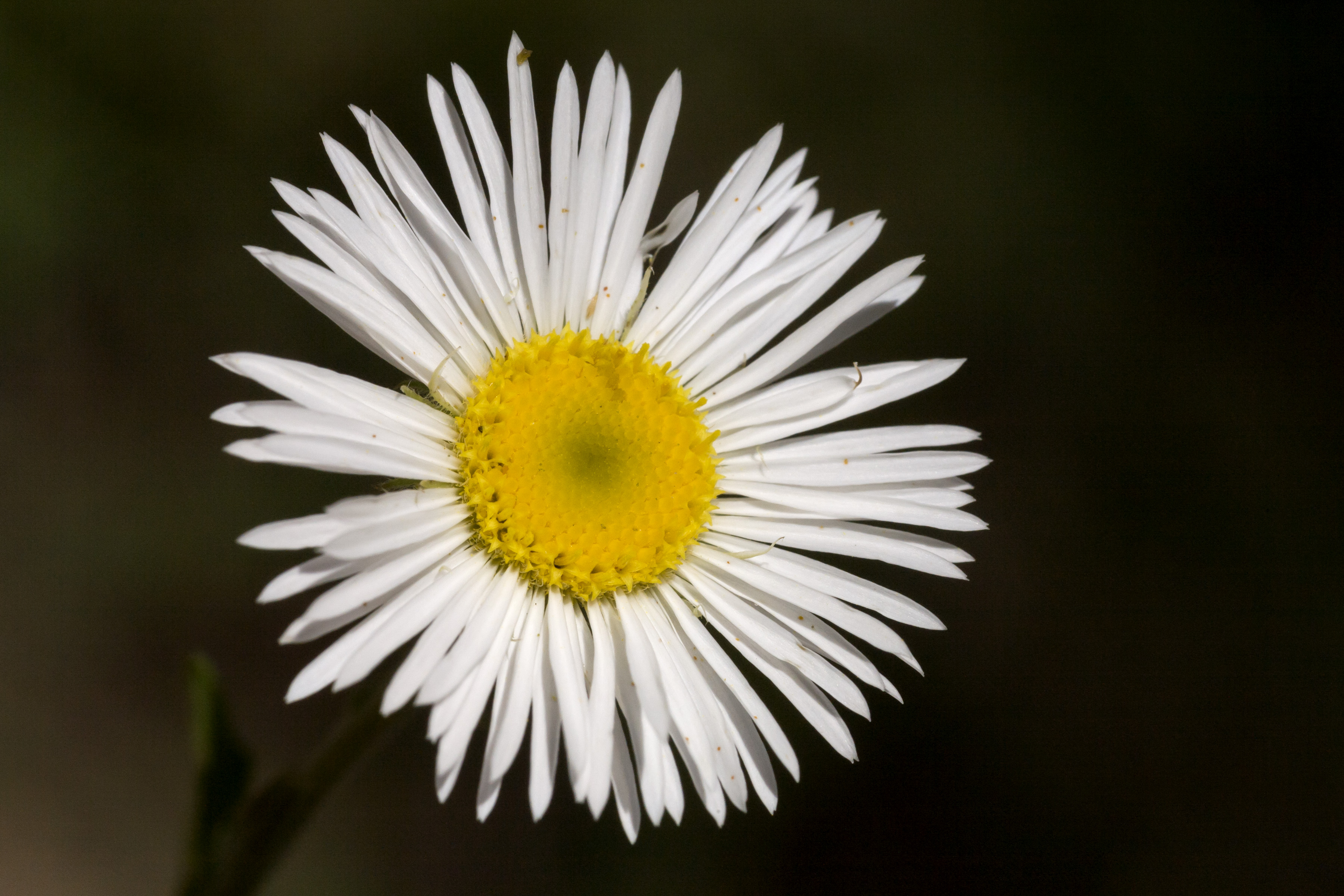

Scientific classification
- Kingdom: Plantae
- Clade: Tracheophytes
- Clade: Angiosperms
- Clade: Eudicots
- Clade: Asterids
- Order: Asterales
- Family: Asteraceae
- Genus: Erigeron
- Species: E. rybius

Binomial name
- Erigeron rybius G.L.Nesom

= Erigeron rybius =

Species of flowering plant

Erigeron rybius is a North American species of flowering plant in the family Asteraceae known by the common names Sacramento Mountain fleabane and royal fleabane. It is native to the western Texas and south-central New Mexico in the southwestern United States. The common name alludes to the Sacramento Mountains just east of Alamogordo in New Mexico.

Erigeron rybius grows in grassy meadows and disturbed sites in coniferous forests. It is a perennial herb up to 35 centimeters (14 inches) tall, spreading by means of underground rhizomes and by leafy stolons that run along the surface of the ground. The inflorescence contains 1-6 flower heads per stem. Each head contains 47–99 white ray florets surrounding many yellow disc florets.
