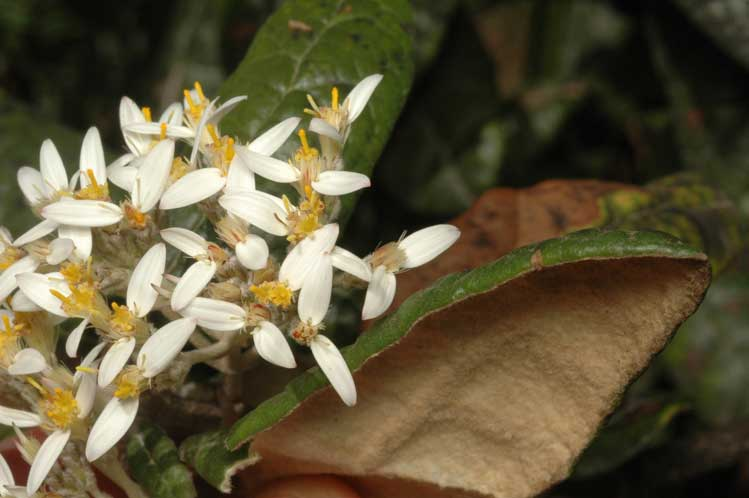

Scientific classification
- Kingdom: Plantae
- Clade: Tracheophytes
- Clade: Angiosperms
- Clade: Eudicots
- Clade: Asterids
- Order: Asterales
- Family: Asteraceae
- Genus: Olearia
- Species: O. covenyi

Binomial name
- Olearia covenyi Lander

= Olearia covenyi =

Species of shrub

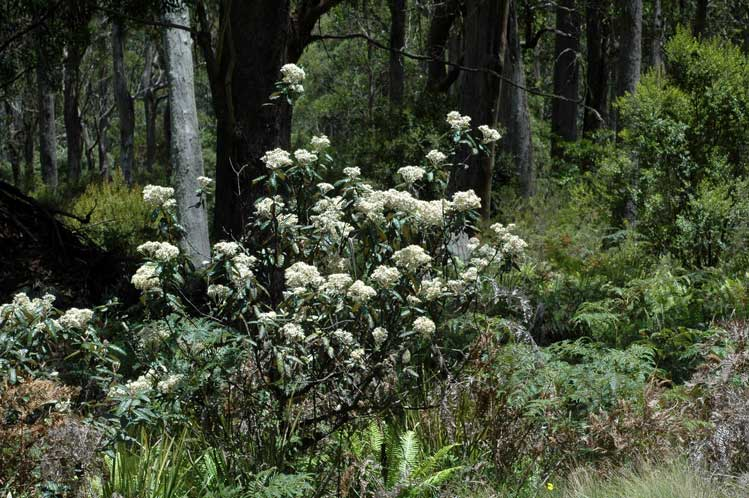
Habit and habitat

Olearia covenyi is a species of flowering plant in the family Asteraceae and is endemic to New South Wales. It is a shrub with scattered egg-shaped leaves, and white and yellow, daisy-like inflorescences.

== Description ==
Olearia covenyi is a shrub that typically grows to a height of up to 3 m (9.8 ft), its stems densely covered with woolly, yellowish-brown hairs. The leaves arranged in opposite pairs, scattered, egg-shaped, 23–130 mm (0.91–5.12 in) long and 12–50 mm (0.47–1.97 in) wide with the edges rolled down. The upper surface of the leaves is glabrous and the lower surface is covered with felt-like, yellowish-brown hairs. The heads or daisy-like "flowers" are arranged on the ends of branchlets and are 16–22 mm (0.63–0.87 in) in diameter on a peduncle up to 11 mm (0.43 in) long. Each head has two or three white ray florets surrounding three or four yellow disc florets. Flowering occurs in November and December and the fruit is a glabrous achene, the pappus with 41–82 long bristles in two rows.

== Taxonomy and naming ==
Olearia covenyi was first formally described by Nicholas Sèan Lander in 1991 in the journal Telopea from specimens collected in 1967 by Robert ('Bob') Coveny at Gloucester Tops. The specific epithet (covenyi) honours the collector of the type specimens.

== Distribution and habitat ==
This daisy bush grows in wet forests in mountain areas from near Tenterfield to Barrington Tops and from the eastern side of the Great Dividing Range to Yarrowitch and Nundle in eastern New South Wales.
