= Olearia lehmanniana =

Scientific classification
- Kingdom: Plantae
- Clade: Tracheophytes
- Clade: Angiosperms
- Clade: Eudicots
- Clade: Asterids
- Order: Asterales
- Family: Asteraceae
- Genus: Olearia
- Species: O. lehmanniana

Binomial name
- Olearia lehmanniana (Steetz) Lander

Synonyms
- Aster lehmanni F.Muell. nom. inval., pro syn.; Aster lehmannianus (Steetz) F.Muell.; Eurybia lehmanniana Steetz; Olearia conspicua Paczk. & A.R.Chapm. nom. inval.; Olearia elaeophila var. major Benth.; Olearia heleophila var. major Benth. orth. var.; Shawia lehmanniana (Steetz) Sch.Bip.

Species of shrub

Olearia lehmanniana is a species of flowering plant in the family Asteraceae and is endemic to inland areas of the south-west of Western Australia. It is a shrub with scattered elliptic or linear leaves that are densely hairy on the lower surface, and pale mauve, daisy-like inflorescences.

== Description ==
Olearia lehmanniana is a shrub that typically grows up to 1.3 m (4 ft 3 in) and 0.3 m (1 ft 0 in) wide, its stems and leaves covered with simple and glandular hairs. The leaves are arranged alternately, scattered along the branchlets, elliptic or linear, 2–20 mm (0.079–0.787 in) long, 0.5–2 mm (0.020–0.079 in) wide, sometimes sessile with a stem-clasping base, sometimes on a petiole up to 1 mm (0.039 in) long. The upper surface of the leaves is more or less glabrous and the lower surface is densely hairy. The heads or daisy-like "flowers" are arranged singly or in racemes on the ends of branches, more or less sessile and 9–24 mm (0.35–0.94 in) wide. Each head has nine to sixteen pale mauve ray florets, the ligule 7.5–8.5 mm (0.30–0.33 in) long, surrounding seventeen to twenty disc florets. Flowering occurs from February to April and the fruit is an orange-brown achene, the pappus with 28 to 30 long and 10 to 12 short bristles.

== Taxonomy ==
This species was first formally described in 1845 by Joachim Steetz who gave it the name Eurybia lehmanniana in Johann Georg Christian Lehmann's Plantae Preissianae, from specimens collected near Perth in 1839. In 2008 Nicholas Sèan Lander changed the name to Olearia lehmanniana in the journal Nuytsia. The specific epithet (lehmanniana) honours Johann Georg Christian Lehmann.

== Distribution and habitat ==
Olearia lehmanniana grows in a variety of habitats including swamps, heath woodland and forest in the Avon Wheatbelt, Geraldton Sandplains, Jarrah Forest, Mallee and Swan Coastal Plain biogeographic regions of south-western Western Australia.

== Conservation status ==
This daisy bush is listed as "not threatened" by the Western Australian Government Department of Biodiversity, Conservation and Attractions.
