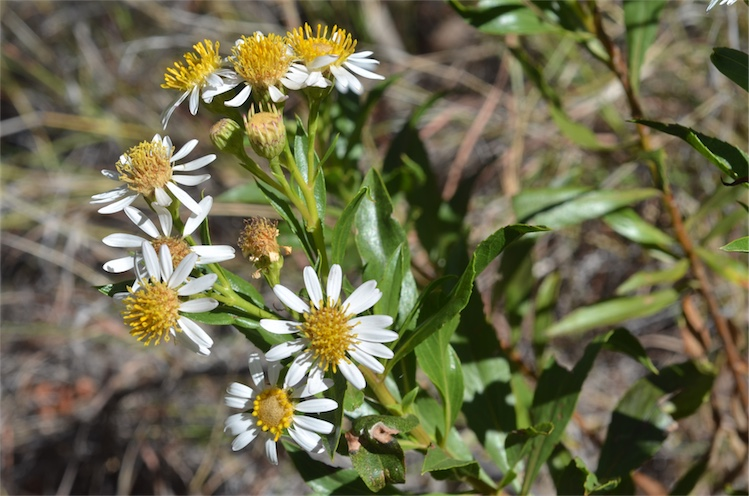
- Near Standley Chasm

Scientific classification
- Kingdom: Plantae
- Clade: Tracheophytes
- Clade: Angiosperms
- Clade: Eudicots
- Clade: Asterids
- Order: Asterales
- Family: Asteraceae
- Genus: Neolaria
- Species: N. ferresii

Binomial name
- Neolaria ferresii (F.Muell.) G.L.Nesom

Synonyms
- Aster ferresii (F.Muell.) F.Muell.; Eurybia ferresii F.Muell.; Olearia ferresii (F.Muell.) F.Muell. ex Benth.

= Neolaria ferresii =

Species of Asteraceae

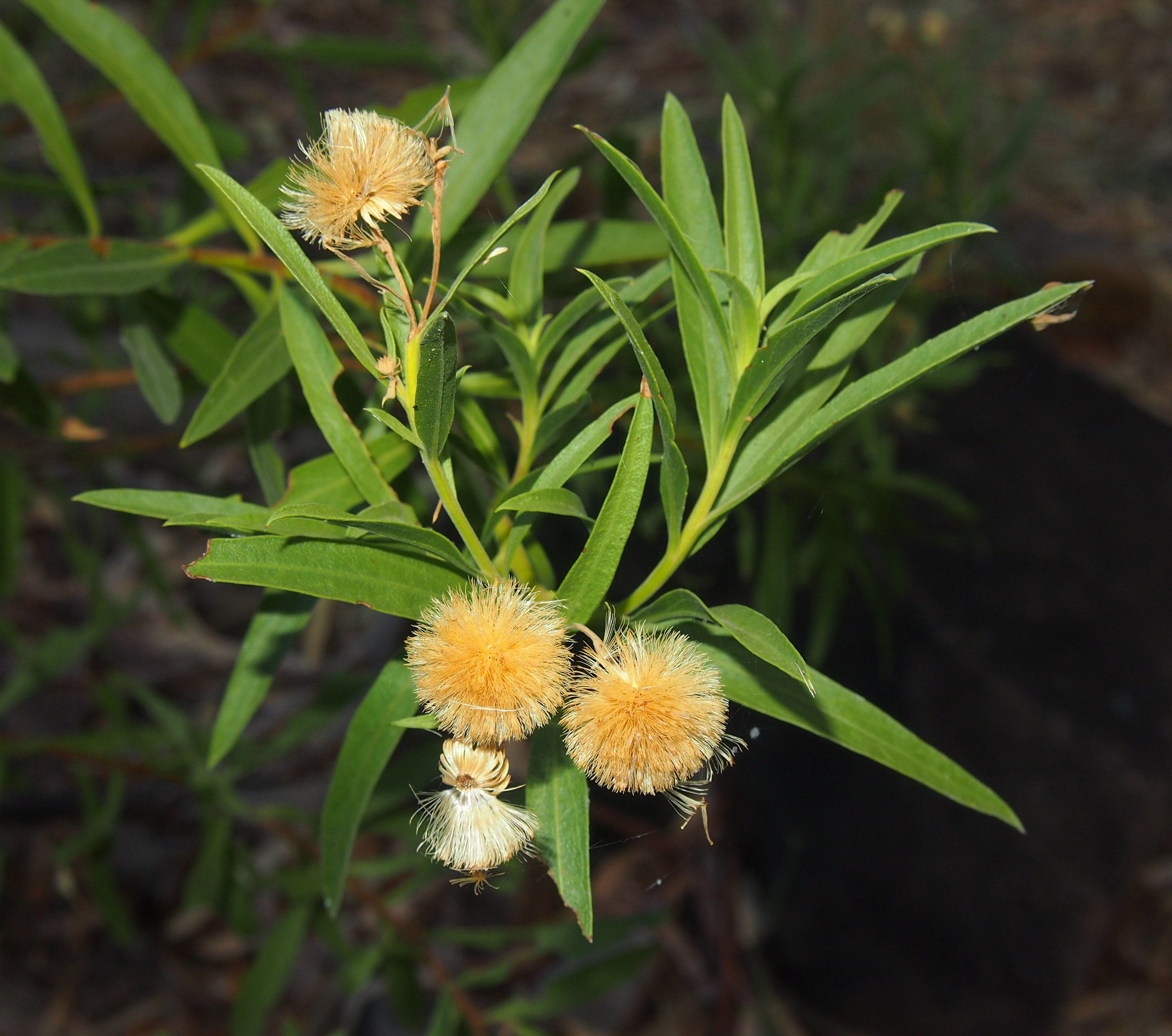
Foliage and fruit

Neolaria ferresii is a species of flowering plant in the family Asteraceae and is endemic to central Australia. It is an erect, aromatic shrub with elliptic to lance-shaped leaves and white and yellow, daisy-like inflorescences.

== Description ==
Neolaria ferresii is an erect, aromatic shrub that typically grows to a height of up to about 1.5 m (4 ft 11 in) and has prominently ribbed stems. The leaves are elliptic to lance-shaped, sometimes with the narrower end towards the base, 40–115 mm (1.6–4.5 in) long, 5–30 mm (0.20–1.18 in) wide and sessile. The leaves are covered with glandular hairs and the edges of the leaves sometimes have small teeth. The heads or daisy-like "flowers" have white, rarely pale pink or pale purple ray florets surrounding yellow disc florets. Flowering occurs in most months and the fruit is a hairy achene about 3–4 mm (0.12–0.16 in) long.

== Taxonomy ==
This daisy bush was first formally described in 1862 by Ferdinand von Mueller who gave it the name Eurybia ferresii in Fragmenta Phytographiae Australiae from specimens collected by John McDouall Stuart in the MacDonnell Ranges. The specific epithet (ferresii) honours John Ferres, the Victorian Government Printer at the time. In 1867, George Bentham changed the name to Olearia ferresii in Flora Australiensis. In 2020 Guy L. Nesom placed the species in the newly-described genus Neolaria as N. ferresii after Olearia had been found to be polyphyletic.

== Distribution and habitat ==
Neolaria ferresii grows on floodplains, on ranges and hills or in creek beds in the south of the Northern Territory, in western Queensland and in the Central Ranges biogeographic region of Western Australia.
