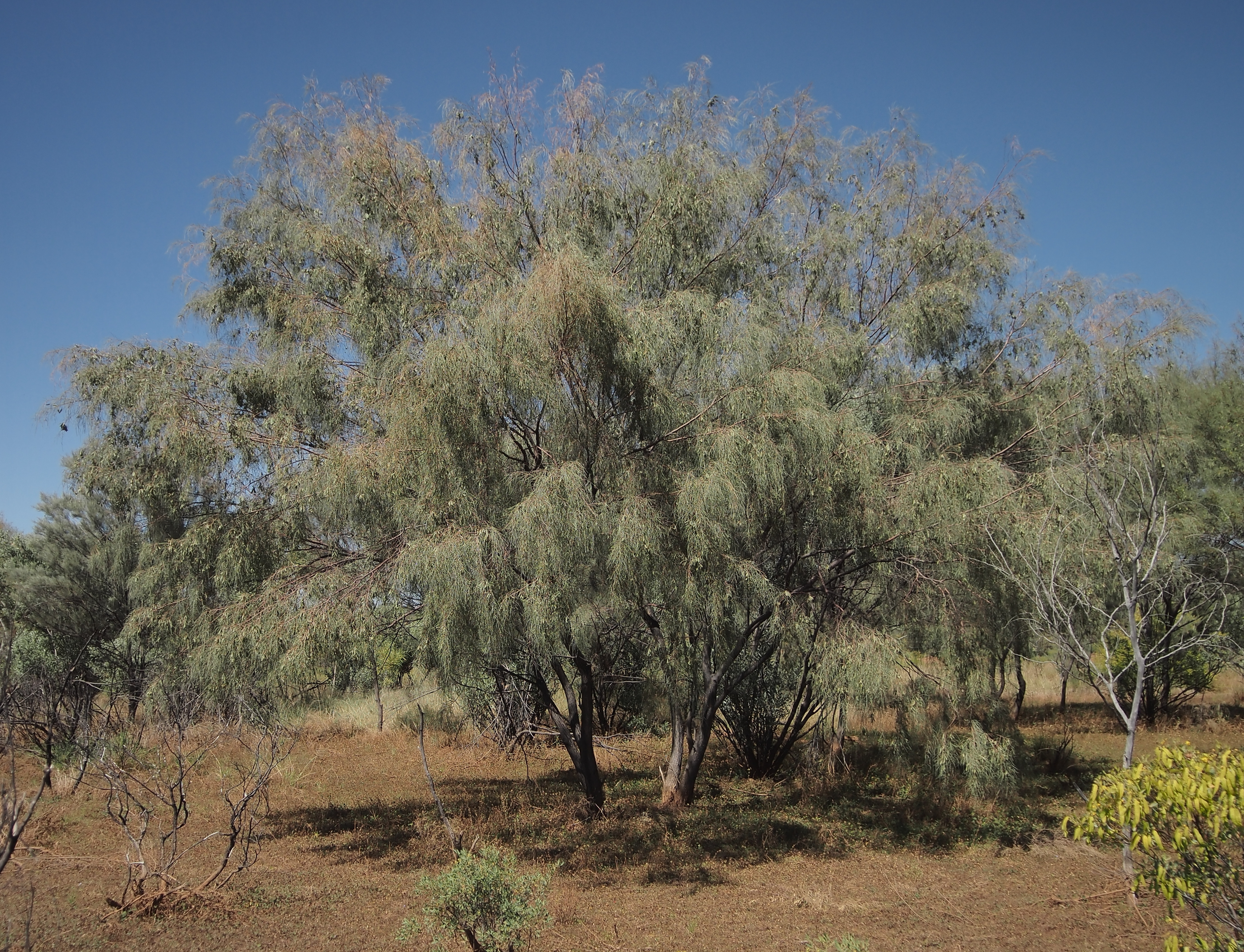

Scientific classification
- Kingdom: Plantae
- Clade: Embryophytes
- Clade: Tracheophytes
- Clade: Spermatophytes
- Clade: Angiosperms
- Clade: Eudicots
- Clade: Rosids
- Order: Fabales
- Family: Fabaceae
- Subfamily: Caesalpinioideae
- Clade: Mimosoid clade
- Genus: Acacia
- Species: A. paraneura

Binomial name
- Acacia paraneura Randell
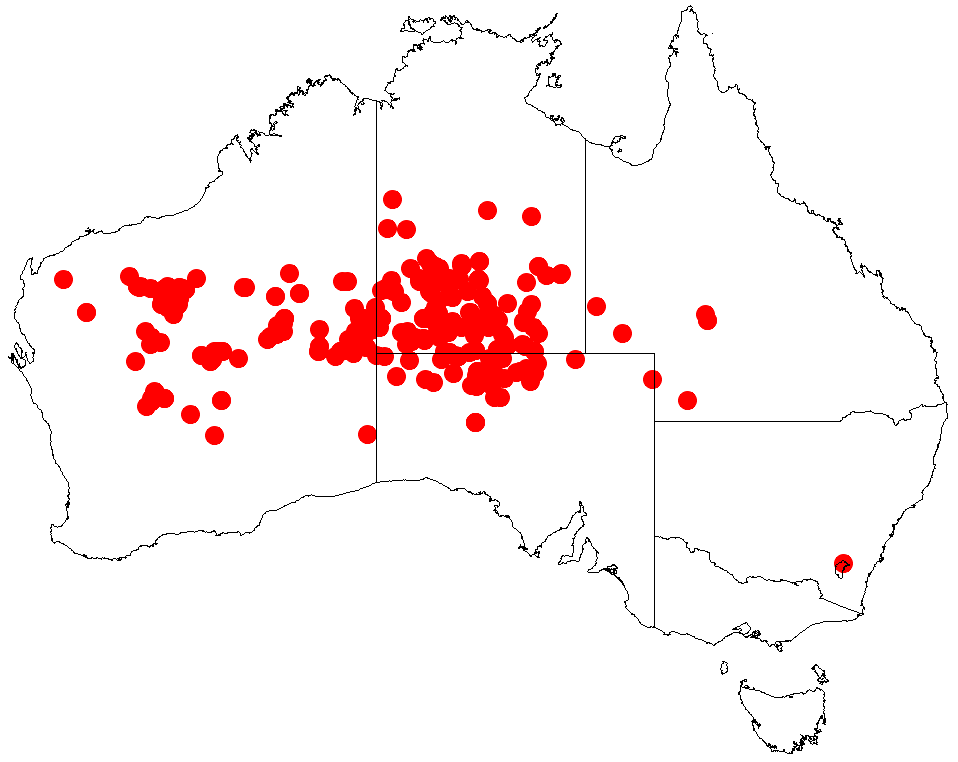
- Occurrence data from AVH

= Acacia paraneura =

Weeping mulga

Species of plant

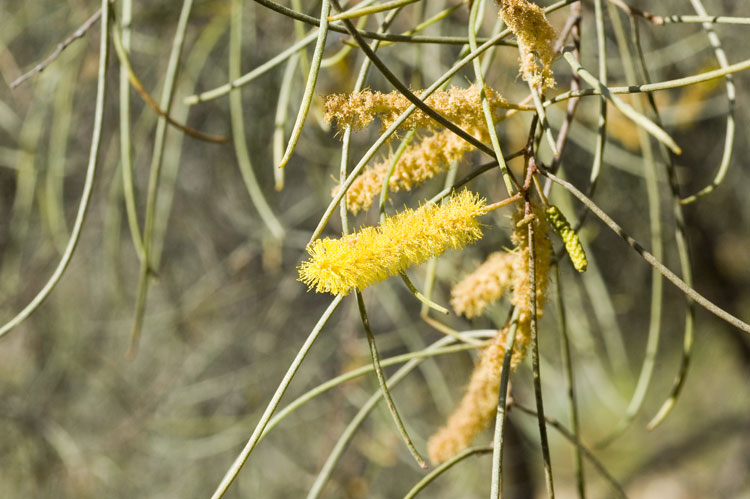
Flowers in the Australian National Botanic Gardens

Acacia paraneura, commonly known as weeping mulga, is a tree or shrub belonging to the genus Acacia and the subgenus Juliflorae. It is native to arid regions of Australia. The Indigenous Kurrama peoples know the tree as warlun.

== Description ==
The tree has a variety of growth habits across Australia, although in Western Australia it typically grows to a height of 3 to 10 metres (10 to 33 ft). It can have one or many main trunks from the base and open or wispy crowns. The stems and branches have grey bark that is longitudinally fissured on the trunk. The straight or shallowly curved phyllodes are a dull green to grey-green in colour. The phyllodes are 6 to 23 centimetres (2 to 9 in) in length and 0.8 to 1.2 millimetres (0.031 to 0.047 in) wide. The simple inflorescences simple resemble golden spikes that are 10 to 30 mm (0.4 to 1.2 in) in length. The seed pods that form later are flat with an oblong to narrowly oblong shape with a length of 2 to 9 cm (0.8 to 3.5 in) and a width of 7 to 17 mm (0.3 to 0.7 in). The shiny brown obloid-ellipsoid to ovoid seeds are 4 to 7 mm (0.16 to 0.28 in) long and half as wide. Across Australia it flowers at various times, although in Western Australia, it much more restricted, flowering from June to September producing yellow flowers, although it is also known to flower following significant rainfall events.

== Taxonomy ==
The species was first formally described by the botanist Barbara Rae Randell in 1992 as part of the work Mulga. A revision of the major species as published in the Journal of the Adelaide Botanic Gardens It was reclassified as Racosperma paraneurum by Leslie Pedley in 2003 and then transferred back to genus Acacia in 2006. The specific epithet is taken from the Greek words para meaning near and aneura meaning without nerves in reference to the phyllodes and the affinity of the species to Acacia aneura.

== Distribution ==
A. paraneura is found in northern South Australia, southern part of the Northern Territory and far Western Queensland. In Western Australia is native to Pilbara and Mid West and Goldfields regions of Western Australia.

The plant grows in a variety of environments across Australia, although in Western Australia it is much more restricted and will only grow in sandy or clay soils and is often found on stony plains and in clay-pans in and around drainage lines or alluvial or stony to hard-pan plains where it grows in gilgai clay or heavy loam soils as a part of low woodland communities that can feature Acacia aneura, Acacia catenulata and Acacia distans as well as species of Eremophila.

== See also ==
- List of Acacia species
