= Arckaringa =

Arckaringa may refer to:

- Arckaringa Station, a pastoral lease in South Australia
  - Arckaringa, South Australia, a gazetted locality coincident with the pastoral lease
- Arckaringa Basin, an endorheic basin in the same area with possible coal or oil deposits
