= Erigeron sceptrifer =

Scientific classification
- Kingdom: Plantae
- Clade: Tracheophytes
- Clade: Angiosperms
- Clade: Eudicots
- Clade: Asterids
- Order: Asterales
- Family: Asteraceae
- Genus: Erigeron
- Species: E. sceptrifer

Binomial name
- Erigeron sceptrifer G.L.Nesom

Species of flowering plant

Erigeron sceptrifer is a North American species of flowering plant in the family Asteraceae known by the common name scepter-bearing fleabane. It has been found in northern Mexico (Chihuahua, Sonora, San Luis Potosí) and the southeastern United States (Cochise County in Arizona).

Erigeron sceptrifer grows in grasslands, frequently alongside widely spaced pine, oak, and juniper trees. It is an annual herb up to 80 cm (32 inches) tall, forming a thin taproot. The inflorescence generally contains 20–50 flower heads in a loose array. Each head can sometimes contain as many as 195 white ray florets surrounding many yellow disc florets.
