= Cordiofontis =

Scientific classification
- Kingdom: Plantae
- Clade: Tracheophytes
- Clade: Angiosperms
- Clade: Eudicots
- Clade: Asterids
- Order: Asterales
- Family: Asteraceae
- Subfamily: Asteroideae
- Tribe: Astereae
- Subtribe: Asterinae
- Genus: Cordiofontis; G.L.Nesom (2020)

Species
- See text

Genus of flowering plants

Cordiofontis is a genus of flowering plants in the sunflower family, Asteraceae. It includes five species of rhizomatous herbaceous perennials, four of which are native to Pakistan and the western and central Himalayas, while one is native to south-central China.

The five species in the genus were formerly placed in the genus Aster. In 2020, Guy L. Nesom classified them into the new genus Cordiofontis based on their distinct morphology.

== Species ==
Five species are accepted.

- Cordiofontis flexuosa (Royle ex Lindl.) G.L.Nesom – northeastern Pakistan to Nepal
- Cordiofontis laka (C.B.Clarke) G.L.Nesom – western Himalayas
- Cordiofontis longipetiolata (C.C.Chang) G.L.Nesom – western Sichuan
- Cordiofontis nepalensis (Grierson) G.L.Nesom – Nepal
- Cordiofontis peduncularis (Wall. ex Nees) G.L.Nesom – northeastern Pakistan and western Himalayas
