= Landerolaria arckaringensis =

Conservation status
- Endangered (EPBC Act)

Scientific classification
- Kingdom: Plantae
- Clade: Tracheophytes
- Clade: Angiosperms
- Clade: Eudicots
- Clade: Asterids
- Order: Asterales
- Family: Asteraceae
- Genus: Landerolaria
- Species: L. arckaringensis

Binomial name
- Landerolaria arckaringensis (Lang) G.L.Nesom

Synonyms
- Olearia arckaringensis P.J.Lang

Species of shrub

Landerolaria arckaringensis (synonym Olearia arckaringensis), commonly known as Arckaringensis daisy, is a species of flowering plant in the family Asteraceae and is endemic to a restricted area of northern South Australia. It is a small, compact, rounded shrub with woolly-hairy foliage, coarsely-toothed, elliptic leaves and lavender or white and yellow, daisy-like inflorescences.

== Description ==
Landerolaria arckaringensis is a small, compact, rounded shrub with a thick, woody base, its stems covered with white, woolly hairs. The leaves are elliptic, 13–17 mm (0.51–0.67 in) long and 5–16 mm (0.20–0.63 in) wide on a petiole 2–5 mm (0.079–0.197 in) long and white woolly-hairy with four to eight coarse teeth on the edges. The heads are arranged singly on the ends of branchlets, each head or daisy-like "flower" on a peduncle 40–80 mm (1.6–3.1 in) long with 61–80 outer involucral bracts. There are 36 to 60 ray florets, the petal-like ligule lavender or white and 11–18 mm (0.43–0.71 in) long, surrounding 44–72 yellow disc florets. The fruit is a hairy, light brown cypsela 2.0–2.6 mm (0.079–0.102 in) long, the pappus with 18–28 bristles.

== Taxonomy and naming ==
The species was first formally described as Olearia arckaringensis by Peter J. Lang in 2008 in the Journal of the Adelaide Botanic Gardens from specimens collected on Arckaringa Station in 2000. The specific epithet (arckaringensis) refers to the type location. In 2020 Guy L. Nesom placed the species in the newly-described genus Landerolaria as L. arckaringensis after Olearia had been found to be polyphyletic.

== Distribution and habitat ==
This daisy-bush grows in low, open woodland on dissected breakaways on the Arckaringa Hills in northern South Australia.

== Conservation status ==
Arckaringensis daisy is listed as "endangered" under the Australian Government Environment Protection and Biodiversity Conservation Act 1999. The main threats to the species include grazing and trampling by feral animals and livestock.
