= Guynesomia =

Scientific classification
- Kingdom: Plantae
- Clade: Tracheophytes
- Clade: Angiosperms
- Clade: Eudicots
- Clade: Asterids
- Order: Asterales
- Family: Asteraceae
- Subfamily: Asteroideae
- Tribe: Astereae
- Subtribe: Baccharidinae
- Genus: Guynesomia; Bonif. & G.Sancho
- Species: G. scoparia

Binomial name
- Guynesomia scoparia (Phil.) Bonif. & G.Sancho

Synonyms
- Nardophyllum scoparium Phil.; Hinterhubera scoparia (Phil.) Cabrera

Species of plant

Guynesomia is a genus of Chilean flowering plants in the tribe Astereae within the family Asteraceae.

The genus is named in honor of US botanist Guy L. Nesom.

Species

The only known species is Guynesomia scoparia, native to the Coquimbo Region in Chile.
