= Painted Desert (South Australia) =

Geographical feature in South Australia

Coordinates: 27.905921°S 134.836417°E

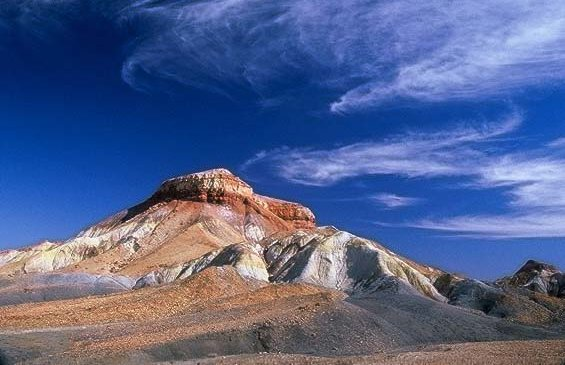
Mount Arckaringa in the Painted Desert

The Painted Desert is in the Far North of South Australia. It is 120 kilometres (75 mi) north-east of Coober Pedy, in the Arckaringa Station pastoral lease, not far from the homestead. It is notable for its distinctive mesas, mountains, and geological formations. Not far from here on the way to Oodnadatta, there are large areas of ground covered with mica. The entire region is desolate and made up of soft, fragile rock.

== Geology ==
The Painted Desert was seabed 80 million years ago. As the land rose, some of the rock has eroded away, leaving the Arckaringa Hills in many shades of orange, yellow, and white shale on the slopes. The Mirackina Range of mesas extends to the west.

The Arckaringa Hills is of geological and biological significance as it is also the site of rare plant species and the southernmost extent of the range of Australia's largest monitor lizard.

== See also ==
- Painted Desert (Arizona)
