= Nesomia =

Scientific classification
- Kingdom: Plantae
- Clade: Tracheophytes
- Clade: Angiosperms
- Clade: Eudicots
- Clade: Asterids
- Order: Asterales
- Family: Asteraceae
- Subfamily: Asteroideae
- Tribe: Eupatorieae
- Genus: Nesomia; B.L.Turner
- Species: N. chiapensis

Binomial name
- Nesomia chiapensis B.L.Turner

Genus of flowering plants

Nesomia is a genus of flowering plants in the tribe Eupatorieae within the family Asteraceae.

The genus is named in honor of American botanist Guy L. Nesom.

== Species ==
The only known species is Nesomia chiapensis, native to the State of Chiapas in southern Mexico.
