= Arckaringa Station =

Pastoral lease in South Australia

Coordinates: 27.9384°S 134.7386°E

Location in South Australia

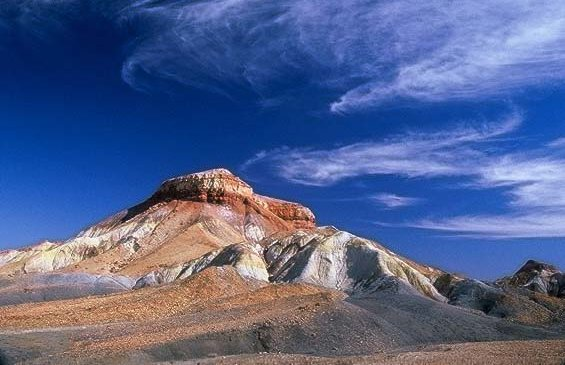
Mount Arckaringa in the Painted Desert

Arckaringa Station is a pastoral lease in the Australian state of South Australia which that once operated as a sheep station but now operates as a cattle station.

It is located approximately 83 kilometres (52 mi) south west of Oodnadatta and 117 kilometres (73 mi) north of Coober Pedy. Most of the property is composed of gibber plains, flood-out creek systems and breakaway country. The ephemeral Arckaringa Creek runs through the property. The property and the Creek are both named after the rocky outcrop, Mount Arckaringa in the Painted Desert. The name is Aboriginal in origin but the meaning is not known.

The property currently occupies an area of 2,745 square kilometres (1,060 sq mi) and is able to carry 2,100 head of cattle. The average rainfall in the area is 139 millimetres (5 in) with stock on the property reliant on water from 17 bores and dug out 20 dams.

A government bore had been sunk on the upper Arckaringa Creek in 1883 for the purposes of watering stock along a stock route than ran through the area from the Musgrave Ranges.

Established some time prior to 1908 the property occupied an area of approximately 1,000 square miles (2,590 km^{2}) and was stocked with 2,000 sheep.

The property was having a reasonable season 1912 when it occupied an area of 432 square miles (1,119 km^{2}) within a dry season. The government were planning to sink a bore near the centre of the run as the owner, Mr. F. C. Staer, had lost nearly 400 sheep. In 1913 when the property was having a good season, 12 feet (4 m) high grass samples were sent from Arckaringa to Adelaide for cultivation. The property was owned in 1913 by Mr. F. C. Steer who was still running sheep.

In 1925 Arckaringa was owned by Alexander McLeod, and had experienced heavy rains. In 1935 the area was inundated by heavy rains with Arckaringa receiving 3 inches (76 mm) in one day. The creek ran over 2 miles (3 km) wide in full flood, filling all the waterholes and dams in the area.

In 2000 a new endangered plant species was discovered on the station, Olearia arckaringensis, a form of Daisy-bush with approximately 200 found during a survey. The property was struck by drought in 2004.

The land occupying the extent of the Arckaringa Station pastoral lease was gazetted as a locality in April 2013 under the name 'Arckaringa'.

== See also ==
- List of ranches and stations
