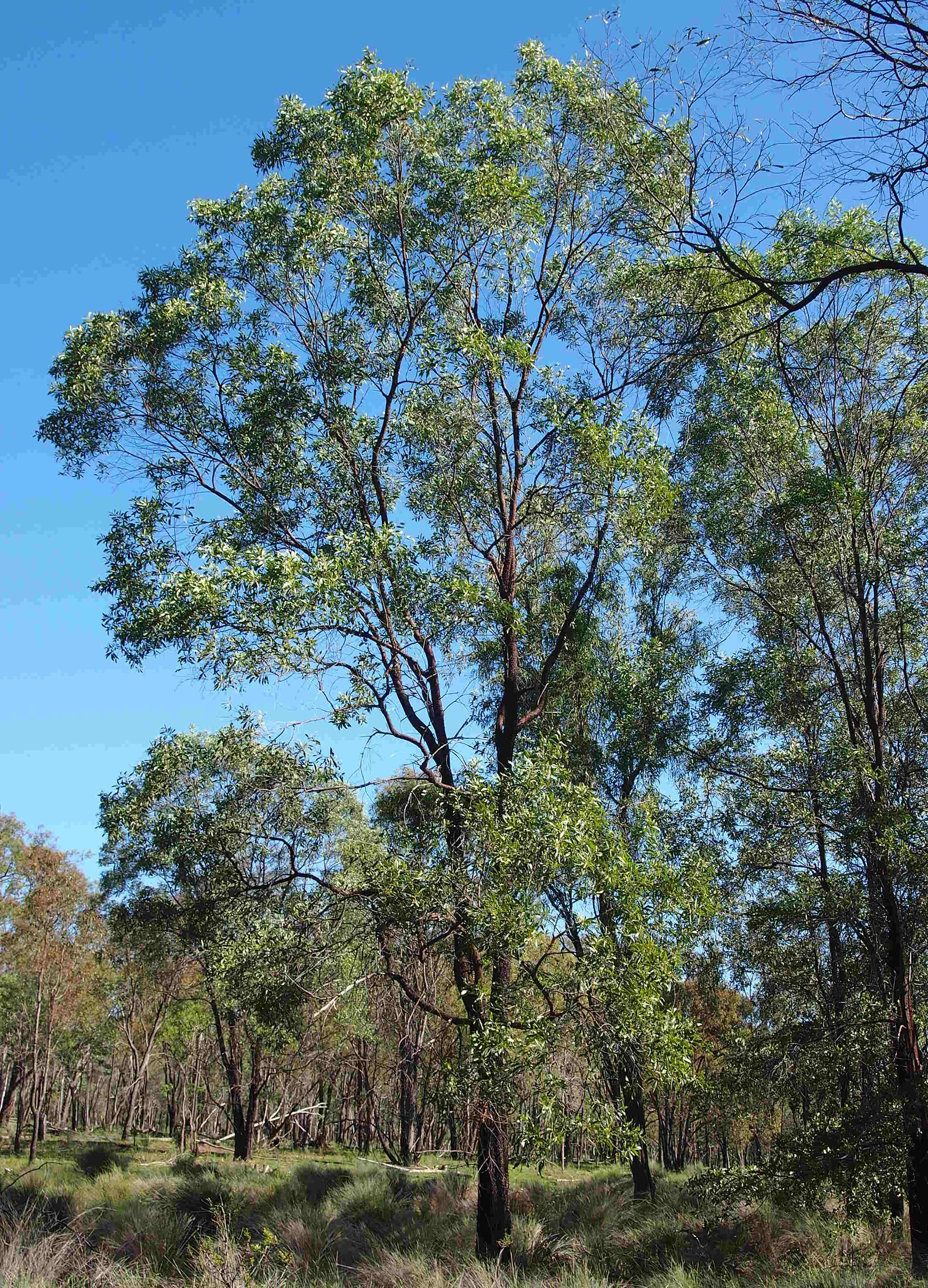

Scientific classification
- Kingdom: Plantae
- Clade: Embryophytes
- Clade: Tracheophytes
- Clade: Spermatophytes
- Clade: Angiosperms
- Clade: Eudicots
- Clade: Rosids
- Order: Fabales
- Family: Fabaceae
- Subfamily: Caesalpinioideae
- Clade: Mimosoid clade
- Genus: Acacia
- Species: A. rhodoxylon

Binomial name
- Acacia rhodoxylon Maiden
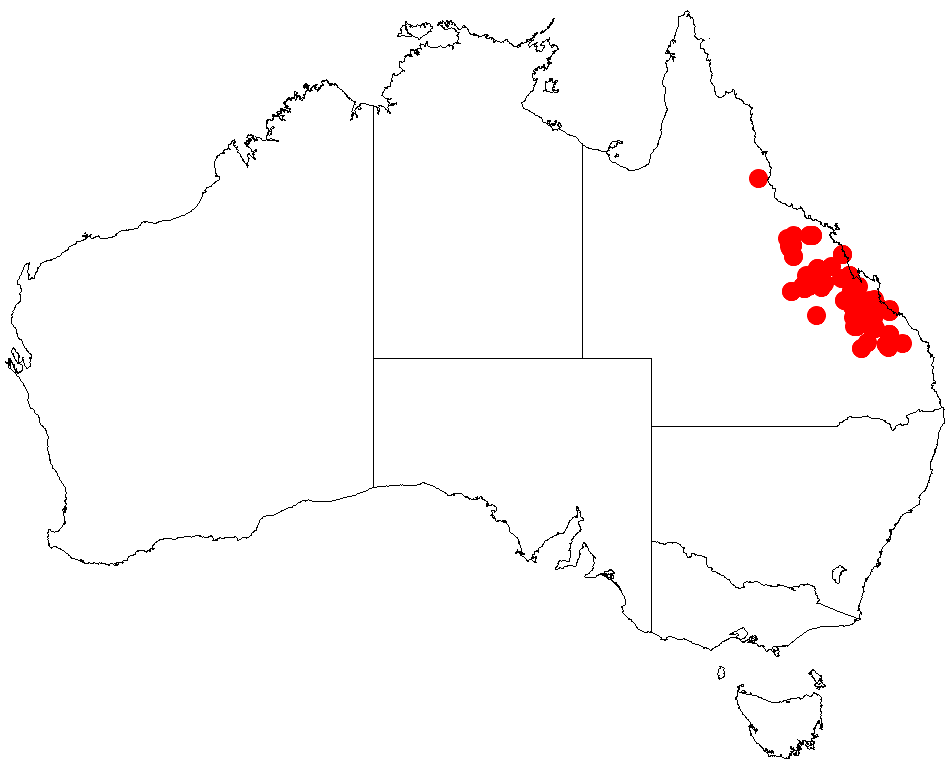
- Occurrence data from AVH

= Acacia rhodoxylon =

Rosewood

Species of legume

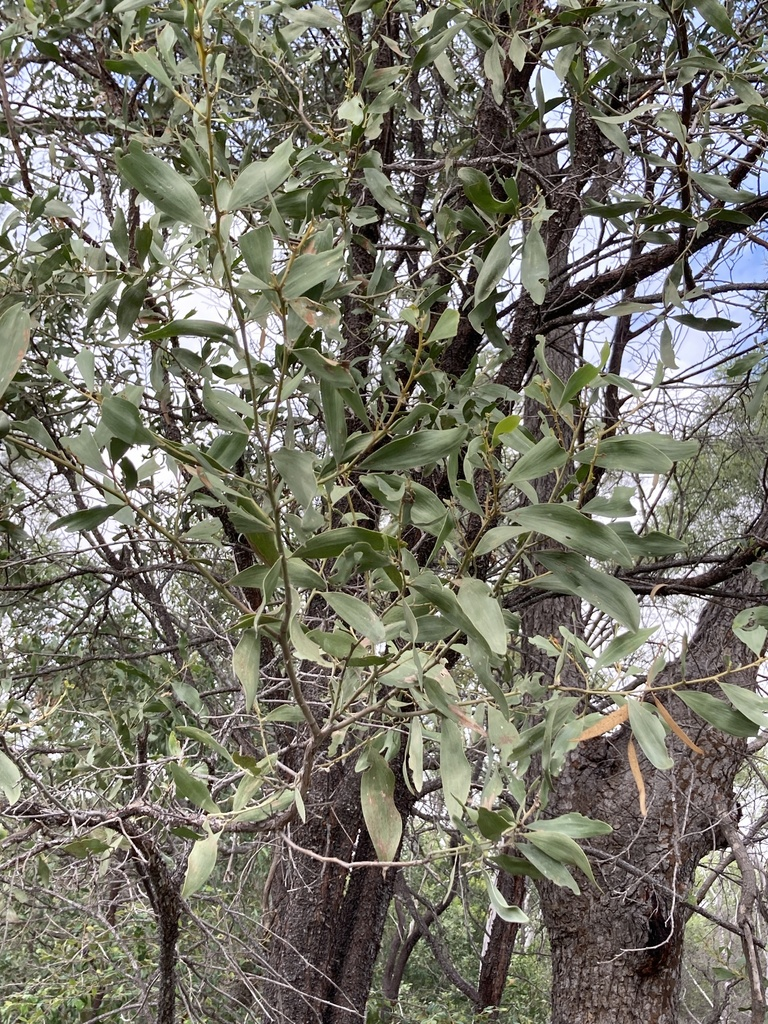
Foliage, near Stanwell

Acacia rhodoxylon, also known as rosewood, ringy rosewood or spear wattle, is a tree belonging to the genus Acacia and the subgenus Juliflorae that is native to north eastern Australia.

== Description ==
The tree typically grows to a height of 6 to 20 m (20 to 66 ft) with a main stem that is 15 to 25 cm (5.9 to 9.8 in) in diameter. The stem as well as the branches are usually fluted in appearance. The heartwood is a deep dark brown to red brown colour while the lighter sapwood is creamy white. It has dark brown to grey coloured bark that peels off in small curved flakes resembling to minni ritchi type species. It has resinous and glabrous branchlets that are angled upwards. Like most species of Acacia it has phyllodes rather than true leaves. The glabrous and coriaceous evergreen phyllodes are quite resinous when young. They have a narrowly elliptic to oblanceolate shape and are usually inequilateral with a convex upper margin and a straight lower margin and can be shallowly sickle shaped. The phyllodes are 6 to 10 cm (2.4 to 3.9 in) in length and 8 to 20 mm (0.31 to 0.79 in) wide with many mostly indistinct nerves with the exception of three to five nerves that are a little more prominent than the others. It flowers sporadically throughout the year producing yellow coloured flowers. The simple inflorescences occur singly or in pairs on 8 to 20 mm (0.31 to 0.79 in) long glabrous stalks. The cylindrical flower-spikes have a length of 2 to 3 mm (0.079 to 0.118 in) and a packed with yellow flowers spikes 2–3 cm long. After flowering glabrous, thinly coriaceous-crustaceous seed pods form that are slightly resinous. The pods age to a brown colour and have a narrowly oblong shape with a length of 3 to 7 cm (1.2 to 2.8 in) and a width of 5 to 9 mm (0.20 to 0.35 in) with longitudinally to obliquely arranged seeds inside. The shiny brown seeds have a widely elliptic shape with a length of 3.5 to 4.5 mm (0.14 to 0.18 in) and a small aril.

== Taxonomy ==
The species was first formally described by the botanist Joseph Maiden in 1920 as part of the work Notes on Acacias, with descriptions of new species as published in the Journal and Proceedings of the Royal Society of New South Wales. It was reclassified as Racosperma rhodoxylon in 1987 by Leslie Pedley and then transferred back to genus Acacia in 2001.

== Distribution ==
It is endemic along the east coast of central Queensland where it is found from around Eidsvold in the south to around Clermont in the north with another disjunct population near Mount Garnett further north where it is a part of Eucalyptus woodland communities. It is often situated in hilly areas or undulating plains in the eastern part of the brigalow belt where it grows in skeletal sandy to clay soils with poor fertility where it is a part of open forest.

== Uses ==
The tree produces a quality and attractive timber but was historically used for fencing as the wood is termite resistant. It has decorative uses as a turned wood, in xylophones and for parts of violins as a substitute for ebony and in sporting goods requiring straight grained timber.

== See also ==
- List of Acacia species
