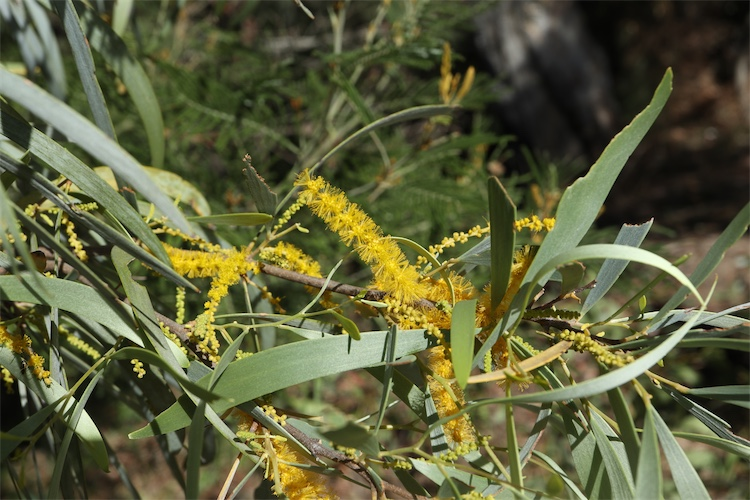
- In the Australian National Botanic Gardens

Scientific classification
- Kingdom: Plantae
- Clade: Embryophytes
- Clade: Tracheophytes
- Clade: Spermatophytes
- Clade: Angiosperms
- Clade: Eudicots
- Clade: Rosids
- Order: Fabales
- Family: Fabaceae
- Subfamily: Caesalpinioideae
- Clade: Mimosoid clade
- Genus: Acacia
- Species: A. distans

Binomial name
- Acacia distans Maslin
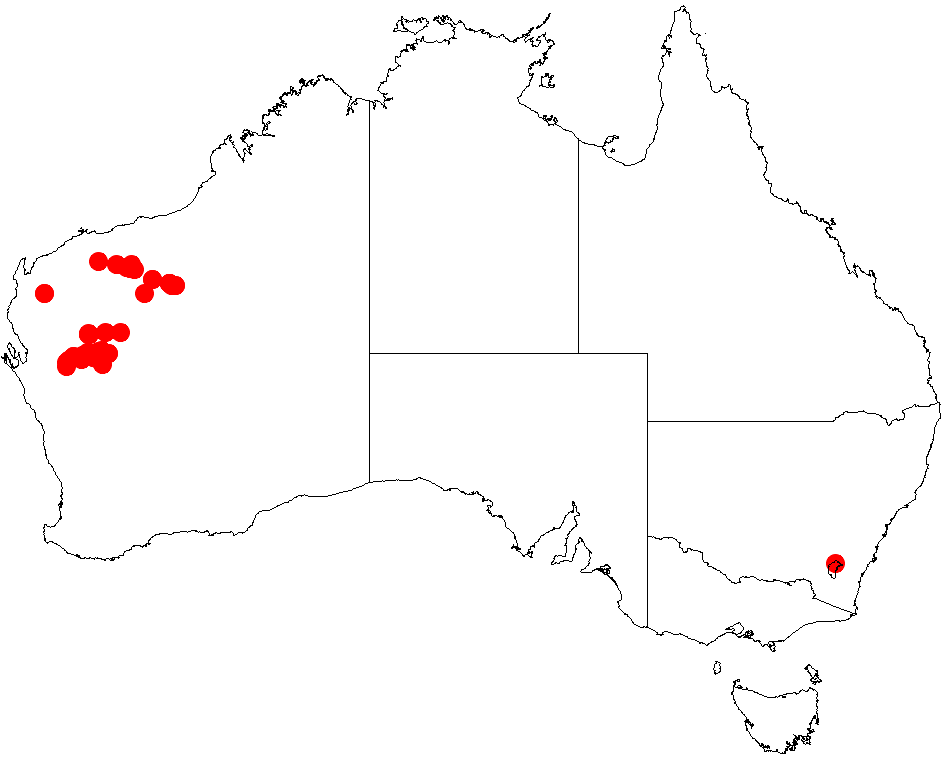
- Occurrence data from AVH

= Acacia distans =

Species of legume

Acacia distans, commonly known as manggurda wattle, is a species of flowering plant in the family Fabaceae and is endemic to the north-west of Western Australia. It is shapely tree with fibrous, fissured grey bark, slender glabrous branchlets, sickle-shaped, thinly leathery phyllodes, spikes of golden yellow flowers and linear, thinly crusty pods.

== Description ==
Acacia distans is a tree that typically grows to a height of 2 to 10 metres (7 to 33 ft) and has fibrous, fissured grey. Its branchlets are slender, glabrous and sometimes pendulous, its new shoots covered with silky hairs when young, later aging to silver. Its phyllodes are sickle-shaped and thinly leathery, 60–100 mm (2.4–3.9 in) long and 4–11 mm (0.16–0.43 in) wide, not sharply pointed, silvery grey-green of silvery green with soft hairs pressed against the surface and the central vein slightly more pronounced than the other veins. The flowers are borne on two spikes 30–70 mm (1.2–2.8 in) long and 4–5 mm (0.16–0.20 in) in diameter on peduncles 8–12 mm (0.31–0.47 in) long, the flowers golden yellow and in clusters along the spikes. Flowering occurs from late March to May or occasionally in June, and the pods are linear, somewhat like a string of beads, slightly raised over and shallowly constricted between the seeds, up to 140 mm (5.5 in) long and 3–6 mm (0.12–0.24 in) wide and thinly crusty. The seeds are elliptic to broadly elliptic, about 6 mm (0.24 in) long, glossy dark brown with a small aril.

== Taxonomy ==
Acacia distans was first formally described in 1983 by Bruce Maslin in the journal Nuytsia from specimens he collected in 1982 near the Gascoyne River crossing, 3 km (1.9 mi) south of Landor Station homestead in Western Australia. The specific epithet (distans) means 'standing apart' or 'distant', referring to the spaced flowers.

== Distribution ==
Manggurda wattle grows on loamy, alluvial plains in low woodland and shrubland, often in pure stands, in a discontinuous distribution, mainly between the Murchison and Ashburton Rivers, but also on the Fortescue River and some tributaries further north, in the Carnarvon, Gascoyne, Murchison and Pilbara bioregions of north-western Western Australia.

== Conservation status ==
Acacia distans is listed as "not threatened" by the Government of Western Australia Department of Biodiversity, Conservation and Attractions.

== See also ==
- List of Acacia species
