= Idalia National Park =

National park in Australia

Idalia
- IUCN category II (national park)
- Location within Queensland
- Location: Queensland
- Nearest city: Blackall
- Coordinates: 24°57′31″S 144°41′50″E
- Established: 1990
- Governing body: Queensland Parks and Wildlife Service
- Website: Official website

Idalia is a national park situated in South West Queensland, Australia, 893 km west of Brisbane. It is located near the town of Blackall in the Queensland outback. The park protects 144,000 hectares of mulga lands with conservation value. Idalia National Park was opened in 1990 by Prince Philip.

The national park is home to many distinctly Australian species of flora and fauna, including wallaroos, red and grey kangaroos, swamp wallabies, black-striped wallabies, yellow-footed rock-wallabies and endangered bridled nailtail wallabies. Contained within the park are several Aboriginal heritage sites, including artefact scatters, stone arrangements and camp sites. Also found in the park are the ruins of two historic homesteads; Idalia and Collabara.

== Facilities ==
There is no accommodation available onsite however camping is allowed at designated sites.

== Access ==
Access to the park is only available via four-wheel drive. In times of heavy rainfall access into and out of the park is not possible.

== Fact sheet ==
- Area: 1440.00 km^{2}
- Coordinates: 24°57′31″S 144°41′50″E
- Date of establishment: 1990
- Managing authorities: Queensland Parks and Wildlife Service
- IUCN category: II

== See also ==
- Protected areas of Queensland
