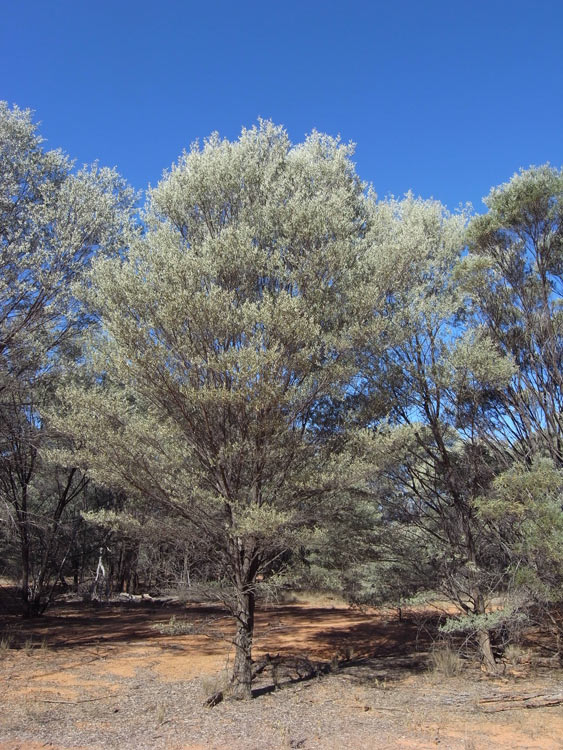
- In Idalia National Park, Queensland.

Scientific classification
- Kingdom: Plantae
- Clade: Tracheophytes
- Clade: Angiosperms
- Clade: Eudicots
- Clade: Rosids
- Order: Fabales
- Family: Fabaceae
- Subfamily: Caesalpinioideae
- Clade: Mimosoid clade
- Genus: Acacia
- Species: A. catenulata

Binomial name
- Acacia catenulata C.T.White
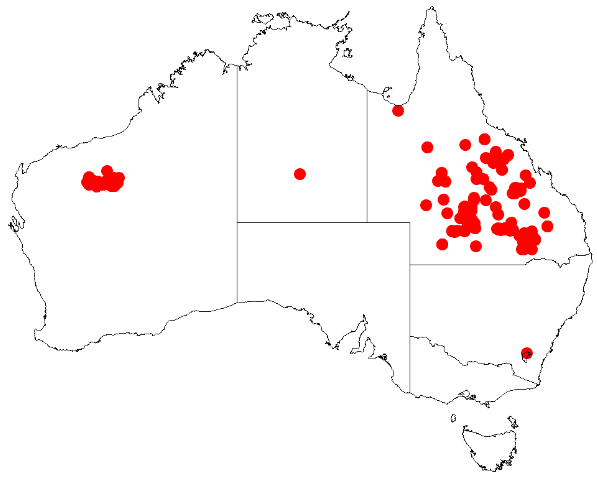
- Occurrence data from AVH

Synonyms
- Racosperma catenulatum (C.T.White) Pedley

= Acacia catenulata =

Bendee

Species of legume

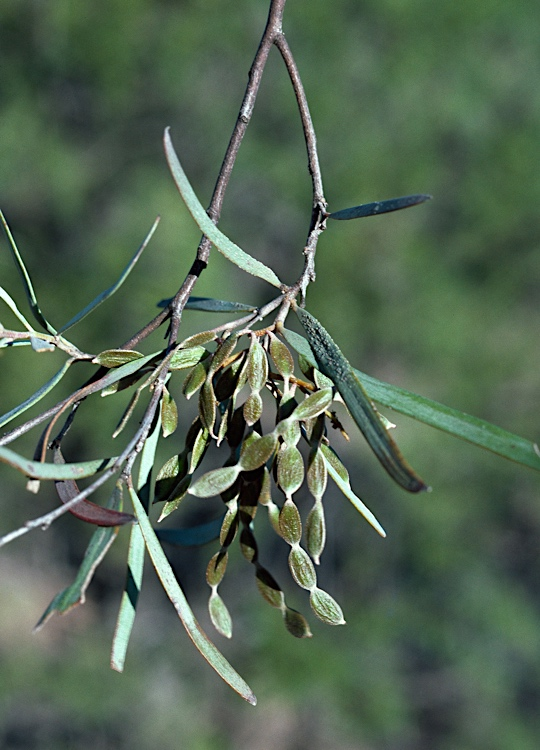
Pods

Acacia catenulata is a species of flowering plant in the family Fabaceae and is endemic to some arid areas of Australia. It is a tree with many short, horizontal branches, mostly glabrous branchlets, narrowly elliptic or oblong to linear phyllodes, spikes of yellow flowers, and thinly leathery to crusty pods up to 80 mm (3.1 in) long and easily broken into short pieces.

== Description ==
Acacia catenulata is tree that typically grows to a height of 15 m (49 ft) and sometimes has a deeply fluted trunk with many short horizontal branches. Its phyllodes are narrowly elliptic to oblong or linear, 30–110 mm (1.2–4.3 in) long 3–8 mm (0.12–0.31 in) wide and not rigid, the cenre vein sometimes the most pronounced. The flowers are borne in one or two spikes in axils on a peduncle2–7 mm (0.079–0.276 in) long. The pods are thinly leathery to crusty, up to 80 mm (3.1 in) long and 4–8 mm (0.16–0.31 in) wide and breaking into segments each containing one seed. The seeds are oblong, 4–5 mm (0.16–0.20 in) long and 2.0–2.5 mm (0.079–0.098 in) wide.

== Taxonomy ==
Acacia catenulata first formally described in 1944 by the botanist Cyril Tenison White in Proceedings of the Royal Society of Queensland, from specimens he collected in 1941 between Mitchell and Morven in the Maranoa district, where it was "common on rocky hills". The specific epithet (catenulata) means 'in short chains', referring to the pods that are contracted between the seeds.

In 2008, Bruce Maslin and Stephen van Leeuwen described subspecies occidentalis, in the journal Nuytsia, and that name, and the name of the autonym are accepted by the Australian Plant Census:

- Acacia catenulata C.T.White subsp. catenulata (the autonym), commonly known as Bendee, is a tree to 15 m (49 ft) and has a deeply fluted trunk, flower spikes 10–30 mm (0.39–1.18 in) long and pods 4.0–5.5 mm (0.16–0.22 in) wide.
- Acacia catenulata subsp. occidentalis, Maslin commonly known as western bendee or black mulga, is a tree to 8 m (26 ft), does not have a fluted trunk, but flower spikes 8–15 mm (0.31–0.59 in) long and pods 4–6 mm (0.16–0.24 in) wide.

== Distribution and habitat ==
Subspecies catenulata grows in pure stands or with emergent eucalypts between Surat, the Grey Range and White Mountains National Park in Queensland, with a disjunct population near the Glyde River in the Northern Territory.

Subspecies occidentalis is confined to the Pilbara and Gascoyne bioregions of Western Australia, where it grows in hardpan or undulating country near watercourses or colluvium, sometimes on low, dry, rocky hills.

== Conservation status ==
Subspecies catenulata is listed as of "least concern" under the Queensland Government Nature Conservation Act 1992 and as "data deficient" under the Northern Territory Government Territory Parks and Wildlife Conservation Act, and subsp. occidentalis is listed as "not threatened" by the Government of Western Australia Department of Biodiversity, Conservation and Attractions.

== See also ==
- List of Acacia species
