= Nicholas Sèan Lander =

Australian botanist

- Born: 1948 (age 77–78)
- Scientific career
- Fields: Botany, Spermatophytes
- Author abbrev. (botany): Lander

Nicholas Lander is an Australian botanist.
