= Guy L. Nesom =

American botanical writer

- Born: August 2, 1945 (age 81)
- Education: University of North Carolina; Davidson College
- Scientific career
- Fields: Systematic Botany
- Workplaces: University of Texas at Austin
- Author abbrev. (botany): G.L.Nesom

Guy L. Nesom (born August 2, 1945) is an American writer and botanist.

Nesom received his Ph.D. in systematic botany from the University of North Carolina in 1980, and has since contributed much to the fields of botanical nomenclature, systematics, and evolution. His most notable contributions are probably his works on the Asteraceae of North America, with several papers published throughout the 1990s that argued for multiple generic names to replace the single polyphyletic name Aster, and his recent and ongoing contributions to the Flora of North America project.

Several plant species have been named for Nesom, such as Zeltnera nesomii of the gentian family and Steviopsis nesomii of the aster family. Three genera are named in his honor: Nesomia, Neonesomia (a synonym of Medranoa), and Guynesomia.

The standard author abbreviation G.L.Nesom is used to indicate this person as the author when citing a botanical name.
