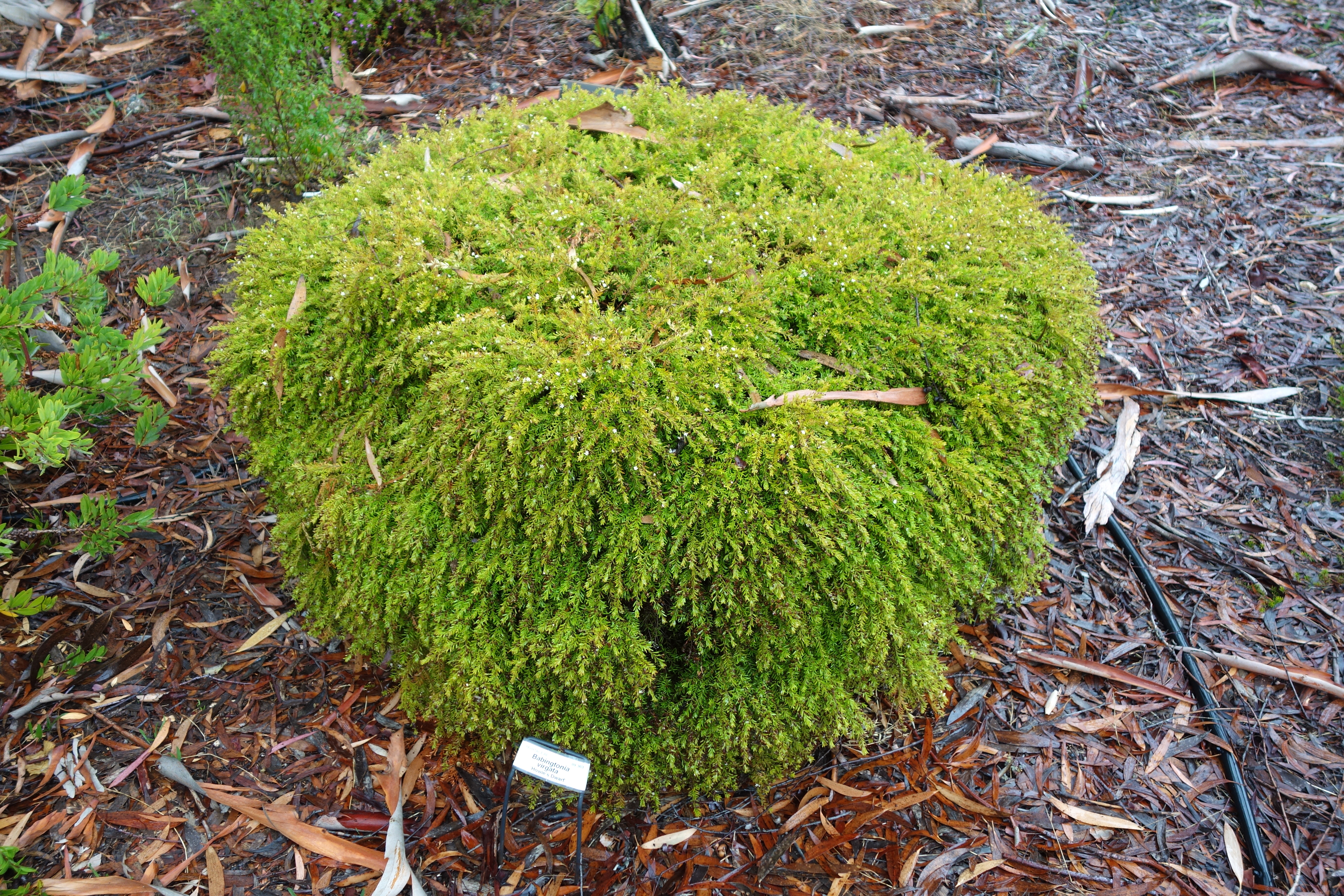

Scientific classification
- Kingdom: Plantae
- Clade: Tracheophytes
- Clade: Angiosperms
- Clade: Eudicots
- Clade: Rosids
- Order: Myrtales
- Family: Myrtaceae
- Genus: Sannantha
- Species: S. virgata

Binomial name
- Sannantha virgata (J.R.Forst. & G.Forst.) Peter G.Wilson

Synonyms
- Babingtonia virgata (J.R.Forst. & G.Forst.) F.Muell.; Baeckea virgata (J.R.Forst. & G.Forst.) Andrews; Harmogia virgata (J.R.Forst. & G.Forst.) Schauer; Leptospermum virgatum J.R.Forst. & G.Forst.; Melaleuca virgata (J.R.Forst. & G.Forst.) L.f.

= Sannantha virgata =

Species of shrub

Sannantha virgata is a flowering shrub species in the myrtle family, Myrtaceae. It is endemic to New Caledonia. The plant grows to between 0.5 and 3 metres high. White flowers appear in spring or summer with 5 rounded petals surrounding 7 to 10 stamens. The fruits are 1–2 mm wide and 2–3 mm in length.

== Taxonomy ==
The species was first formally described in 1775 as Leptospermum virgatum. In 1810 it was placed in the genus Baeckea. By 1997 an Australian Baeckea virgata species complex had been identified which was regarded as separate from the New Caledonian population. From this complex, 8 separate species were identified and placed in the genus Babingtonia. In 2007, the species were placed in the newly created genus Sannantha and assigned the following names:

- Sannantha angusta (A.R.Bean) Peter G.Wilson
- Sannantha bidwillii (A.R.Bean) Peter G.Wilson
- Sannantha brachypoda (A.R.Bean) Peter G.Wilson
- Sannantha collina (A.R.Bean) Peter G.Wilson
- Sannantha crassa (A.R.Bean) Peter G.Wilson
- Sannantha papillosa (A.R.Bean) Peter G.Wilson
- Sannantha pluriflora (F.Muell.) Peter G.Wilson
- Sannantha similis (A.R.Bean) Peter G.Wilson
