= S. cunninghamii =

S. cunninghamii may refer to:

- Sticherus cunninghamii, New Zealand native fern
- Stenocarpus cunninghamii, species of flowering plant in the family Proteaceae
- Scaevola cunninghamii, spreading perennial plant in the family Goodeniaceae
- Sannantha cunninghamii, species of flowering plant in the myrtle family
