= Triplarina calophylla =

Scientific classification
- Kingdom: Plantae
- Clade: Tracheophytes
- Clade: Angiosperms
- Clade: Eudicots
- Clade: Rosids
- Order: Myrtales
- Family: Myrtaceae
- Genus: Triplarina
- Species: T. calophylla

Binomial name
- Triplarina calophylla A.R.Bean

Species of flowering plant

Triplarina calophylla is a species of flowering plant in the myrtle family, Myrtaceae and is endemic to a restricted area of north Queensland. It is a shrub with egg-shaped leaves with the narrower end towards the base, flowers with five sepals, five white petals and fourteen or fifteen stamens.

== Description ==
Triplarina calophylla is a shrub that typically grows to a height of 1.5–2 m (4 ft 11 in – 6 ft 7 in) and has a grey, fibrous bark. The leaves are egg-shaped with the narrower end towards the base, 2.6–4.8 mm (0.10–0.19 in) long and 1.4–2 mm (0.055–0.079 in) wide on a petiole 0.4–0.7 mm (0.016–0.028 in) long. The flowers are arranged in leaf axils in pairs on a peduncle 1.0–1.2 mm (0.039–0.047 in) long. Each flower is about 6.0 mm (0.24 in) in diameter with bracts 0.5–0.6 mm (0.020–0.024 in) long. The sepal lobes are 0.7–0.9 mm (0.028–0.035 in) long and 1.0–1.3 mm (0.039–0.051 in) wide and more or less round and the petals are white, 1.9–2.7 mm (0.075–0.106 in) long and 1.7–2.5 mm (0.067–0.098 in) wide. There are fourteen or fifteen stamens on filaments 1.1–1.2 mm (0.043–0.047 in) long. Flowering has been recorded in July and October and the fruit is a hemispherical capsule 1.5–2.0 mm (0.059–0.079 in) long.

== Taxonomy and naming ==
Triplarina calophylla was first formally described by Anthony Bean in 1995 and the description was published in the journal Austrobaileya from specimens he collected at Mount Abbot near Bowen in 1992. The specific epithet (calophylla) means "beautiful leaf" and refers to the attractive foliage.

== Distribution and habitat ==
This triplarina is only known from two populations near Mount Abbot and Cape Upstart. It grows in shallow sandy soil in shrubland and woodland.

== Conservation status ==
Triplarina calophylla is classified as of "least concern" under the Queensland Government Nature Conservation Act 1992.
