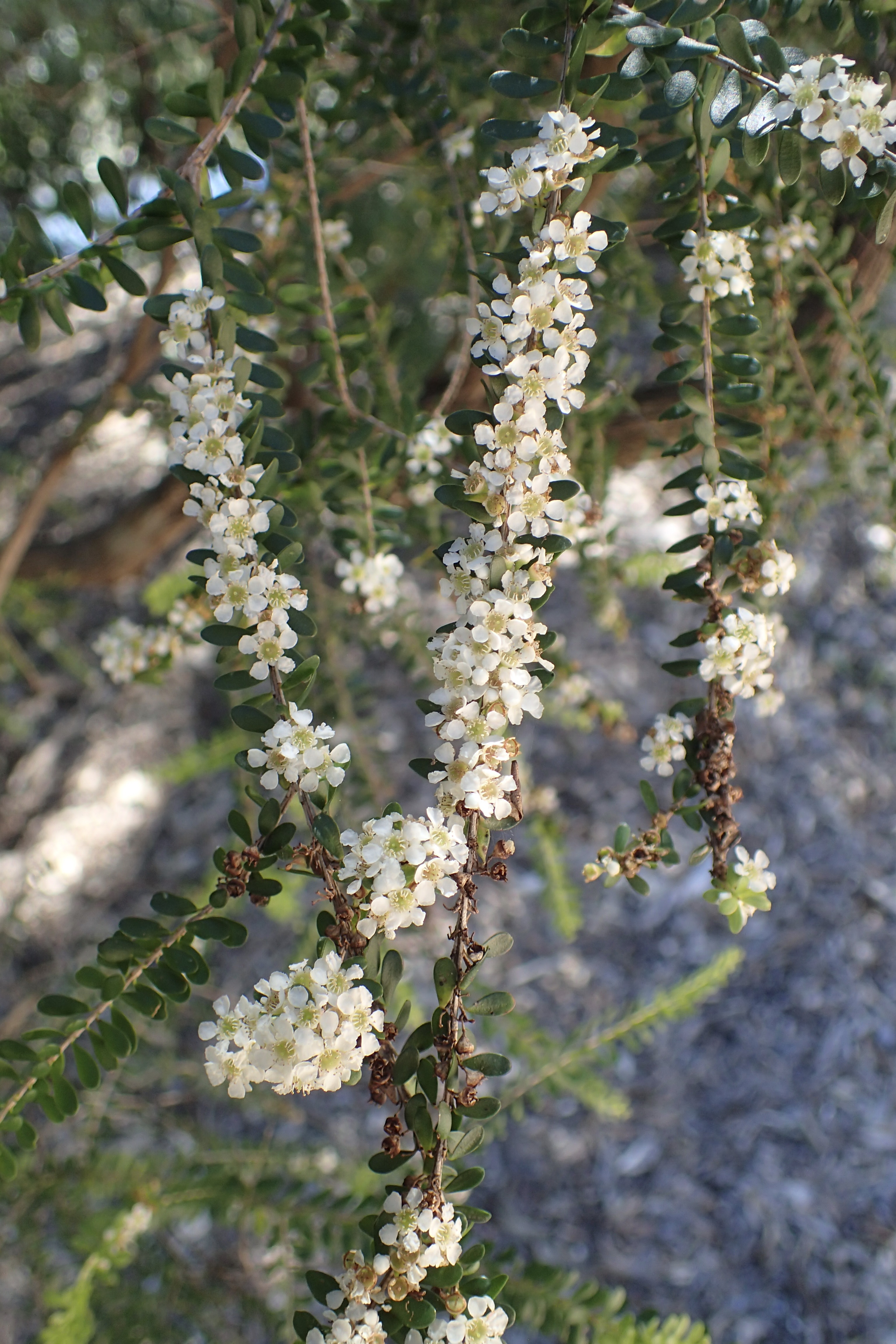
- Subspecies volcanica in Coffs Harbour Botanic Garden

Scientific classification
- Kingdom: Plantae
- Clade: Tracheophytes
- Clade: Angiosperms
- Clade: Eudicots
- Clade: Rosids
- Order: Myrtales
- Family: Myrtaceae
- Genus: Triplarina
- Species: T. volcanica

Binomial name
- Triplarina volcanica A.R.Bean

= Triplarina volcanica =

Species of flowering plant

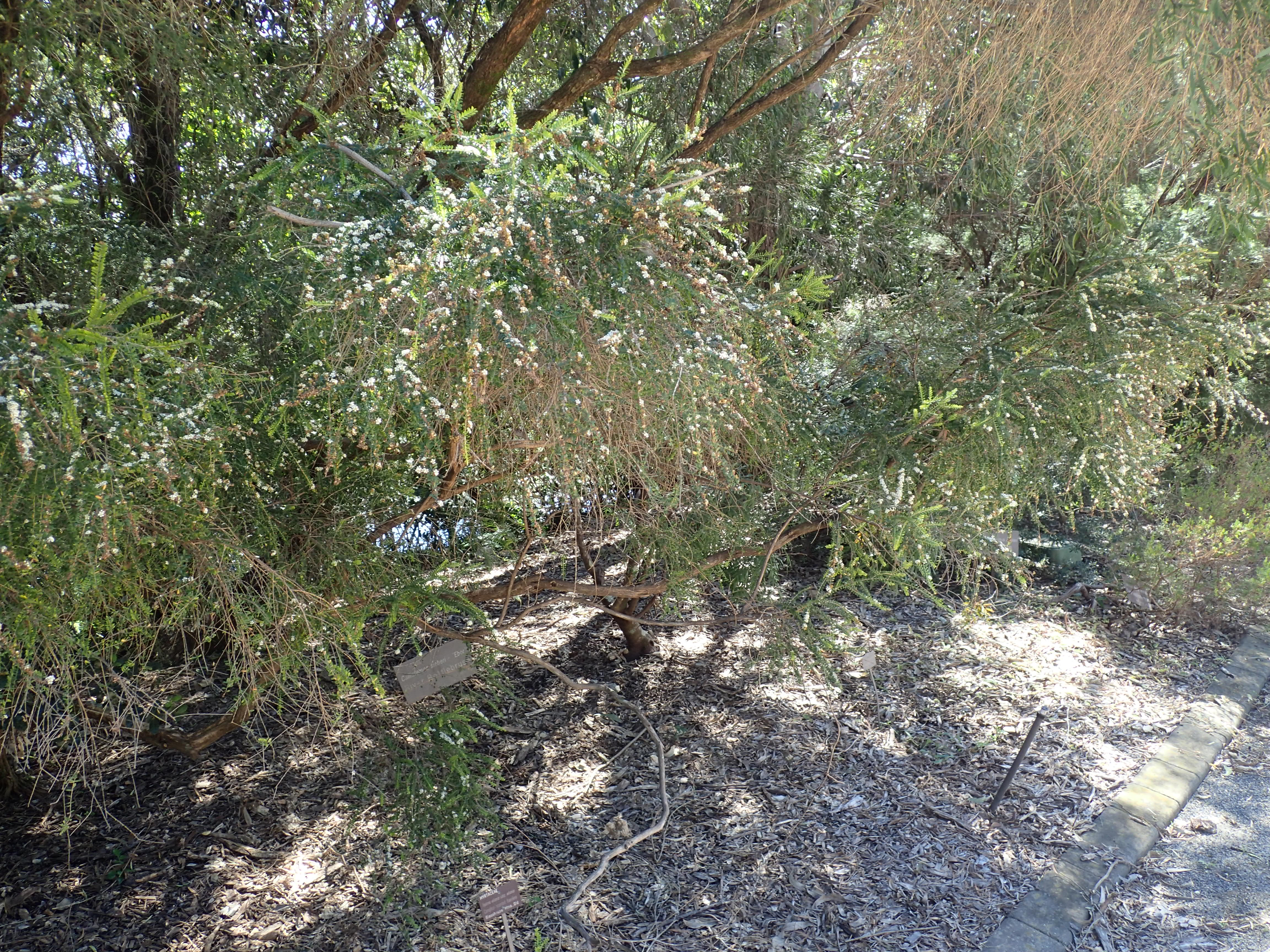
Habit

Triplarina volcanica is a species of flowering plant in the myrtle family, Myrtaceae and is endemic to Queensland, where it is only found in three mountainous areas. It is a shrub with elliptical to egg-shaped leaves with the narrower end towards the base and flowers with five sepals, five white petals and fourteen to sixteen stamens.

== Description ==
Triplarina volcanica is a shrub that typically grows to a height of 1–2.5 m (3 ft 3 in – 8 ft 2 in) and has a fibrous or scaly bark. The leaves are elliptical to lance-shaped with the narrower end towards the base, 4.6–7.2 mm (0.18–0.28 in) long and 1.5–3.3 mm (0.059–0.130 in) wide on a petiole about 0.5 mm (0.020 in) long. The flowers are 5–6 mm (0.20–0.24 in) in diameter on a peduncle 1.4–1.5 mm (0.055–0.059 in) long with bracts 0.4–1.1 mm (0.016–0.043 in) long and bracteoles 1.1–1.3 mm (0.043–0.051 in) long. The sepal lobes are oblong, about 0.5 mm (0.020 in) long and 0.7–0.8 mm (0.028–0.031 in) wide, the petals white, 1.8–2.0 mm (0.071–0.079 in) long and wide. There are fourteen to sixteen stamens on filaments 0.9–1.0 mm (0.035–0.039 in) long. Flowering has been recorded in most months and the fruit is a hemispherical capsule about 1.5 mm (0.059 in) long.

== Taxonomy and naming ==
Triplarina volcanica was first formally described by Anthony Bean in 1995 and the description was published in the journal Austrobaileya from specimens he collected near Mount Beerburrum in the Glass House Mountains in 1993.

In the same journal, Bean described two subspecies and the names are accepted by the Australian Plant Census:

- Triplarina volcanica subsp. borealis A.R.Bean has leaves 4.1–7.2 mm (0.16–0.28 in) long and 1.5–2.1 mm (0.059–0.083 in) wide;
- Triplarina volcanica A.R.Bean subsp. volcanica has leaves 5.4–7.0 mm (0.21–0.28 in) long and 2.3–3.3 mm (0.091–0.130 in) wide.

The specific epithet (volcanica) refers to the rocks on which this species grows, and the epithet borealis means "northern", referring to the more northerly distribution of this subspecies.

== Distribution and habitat ==
This triplarina occurs in a few mountainous areas in eastern Queensland where it grows in heath. Subspecies borealis occurs on Mount Walsh and Biggenden Bluff, near Biggenden and subspecies volcanica is endemic to the Glass House Mountains.

== Conservation status ==
Triplarina volcanica is classified as of "least concern" under the Queensland Government Nature Conservation Act 1992.

== Use in horticulture ==
Subspecies volcanica is sometimes cultivated as Baeckea camphorata.
