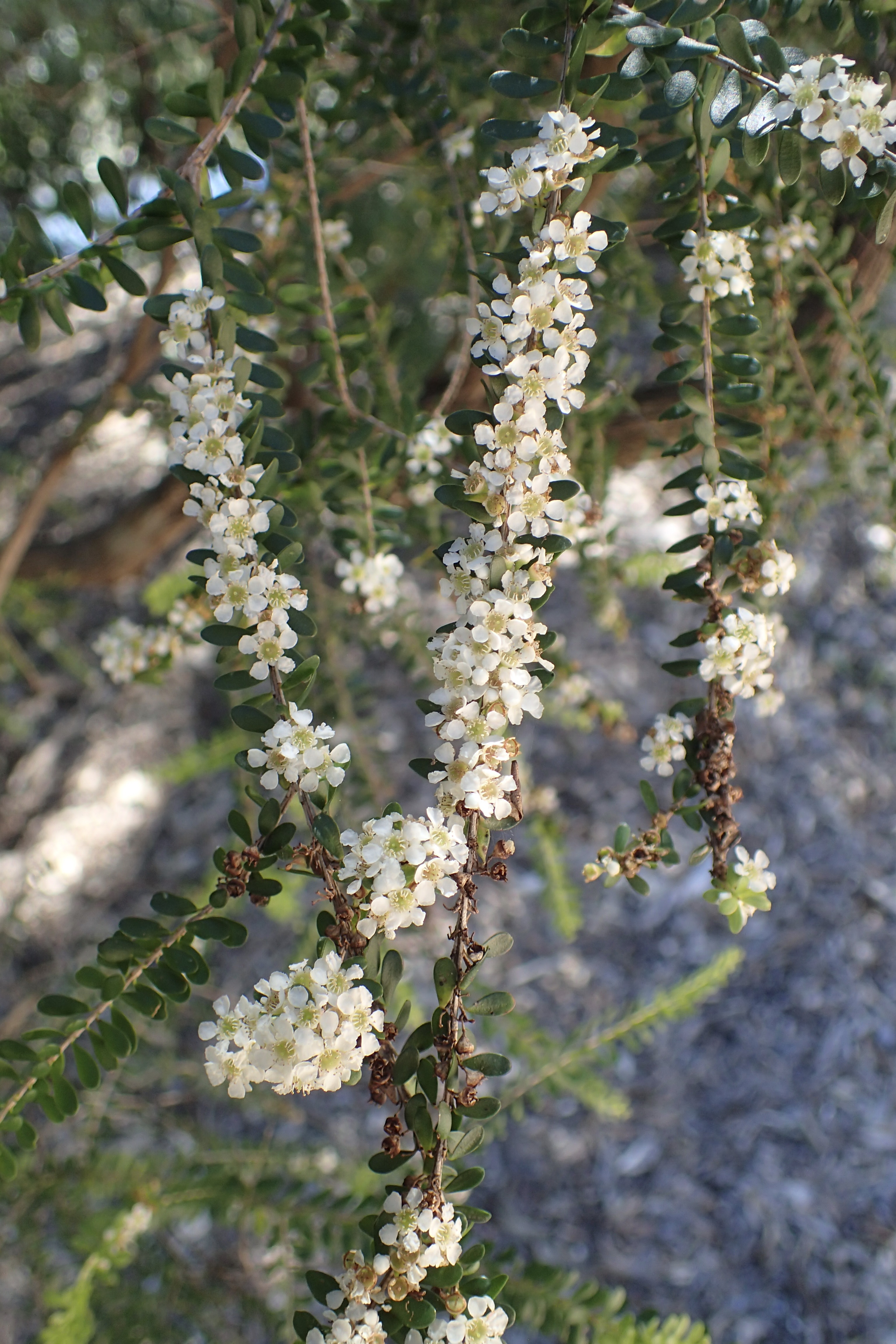
- Triplarina volcanica in the North Coast Regional Botanic Garden

Scientific classification
- Kingdom: Plantae
- Clade: Tracheophytes
- Clade: Angiosperms
- Clade: Eudicots
- Clade: Rosids
- Order: Myrtales
- Family: Myrtaceae
- Subfamily: Myrtoideae
- Tribe: Chamelaucieae
- Genus: Triplarina; Raf.

Species
- See list.

Synonyms
- Camphoromyrtus Schauer; Camphyromyrtus F.Muell. orth. var.; Eremopyxis Baill.

= Triplarina =

Genus of shrubs

Triplarina is a genus of seven species of flowering plants in the family Myrtaceae. They are Baeckea-like shrubs with small leaves arranged in opposite pairs and flowers with five sepals, five more or less round petals, and fourteen to eighteen stamens that are shorter than the petals. Species of Triplarina occur in New South Wales and Queensland usually growing in woodland or forest.

== Description ==
Plants in the genus Triplarina are shrubs with small leaves arranged in opposite pairs, sometimes with wavy or finely-toothed edges, and oil-dots visible on the lower surface. The flowers are arranged in leaf axils, sometimes in pairs and the flowers have five sepals, five petals and fourteen to eighteen stamens. The sepals remain attached to the fruit but the petals that are white to deep pink and more or less round are lost as the fruit develops. The ovary is half-inferior and has three locules, each containing eight to thirteen ovules, and the fruit is a capsule containing kidney-shaped seeds.

== Taxonomy ==
The genus Triplarina was first formally described in 1838 by Constantine Samuel Rafinesque in his book Sylva Telluriana. The first species he described was T. camphorata, now known as Triplarina imbricata.

=== Species list ===
The names of seven species of Triplarina are accepted at the Australian Plant Census:

- Triplarina bancroftii A.R.Bean (Qld.)
- Triplarina calophylla A.R.Bean (Qld.)
- Triplarina imbricata (Sm.) A.R.Bean (N.S.W.)
- Triplarina nitchaga A.R.Bean (Qld.)
- Triplarina nowraensis A.R.Bean (N.S.W.)
- Triplarina paludosa A.R.Bean (Qld.)
- Triplarina volcanica A.R.Bean (Qld.)
  - Triplarina volcanica subsp. borealis A.R.Bean
  - Triplarina volcanica A.R.Bean subsp. volcanica

== Distribution and habitat ==
Shrubs in the genus Triplarina usually grow in woodland or forest, rarely in heath, and are mostly found in small, isolated populations in sheltered positions near the coast, although T. paludosa grows on tablelands 180 km (110 mi) from the coast. They occur from near Ravenshoe in Queensland to near Nowra in New South Wales.
