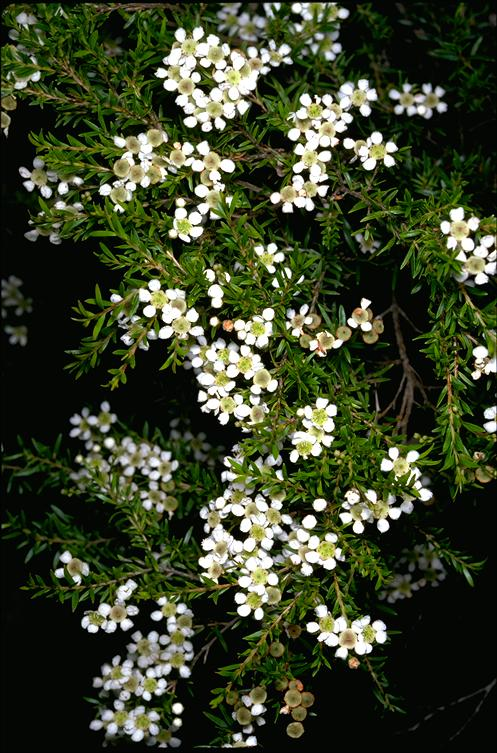
- In the Australian National Botanic Gardens

Scientific classification
- Kingdom: Plantae
- Clade: Tracheophytes
- Clade: Angiosperms
- Clade: Eudicots
- Clade: Rosids
- Order: Myrtales
- Family: Myrtaceae
- Genus: Sannantha
- Species: S. similis

Binomial name
- Sannantha similis (A.R.Bean) Peter G.Wilson

Synonyms
- Babingtonia similis A.R.Bean; Babingtonia sp. (Yatala P.Grimshaw+ G525)

= Sannantha similis =

Species of shrub

Sannantha similis is a species in the myrtle family, Myrtaceae and is endemic to eastern Australia. It is a shrub with narrowly lance-shaped leaves, and groups of three white flowers arranged in leaf axils.

== Description ==
Sannantha similis is a shrub that typically grows to a height of 2–4 m (6 ft 7 in – 13 ft 1 in), its branchlets more or less square in cross-section. Its leaves are narrowly lance-shaped, 7–15 mm (0.28–0.59 in) long and 1.1–1.5 mm (0.043–0.059 in) wide on a petiole 0.6–1 mm (0.024–0.039 in) long. The flowers are 5.5–8.0 mm (0.22–0.31 in) in diameter and arranged in leaf axils in groups of three on a peduncle 5–9 mm (0.20–0.35 in) long, each flower on a pedicel 2.5–4.0 mm (0.098–0.157 in) long with narrowly triangular bracteoles up to 1.2 mm (0.047 in) long at the base. The floral tube is smooth, the sepal lobes up to about 7 mm (0.28 in) long. The petals are white, broadly elliptic to round, 1.5–2.5 mm (0.059–0.098 in) long and wide and there are 7 to 20 stamens. Flowering occurs from January to March, and the fruit is a capsule 2.5–3.5 mm (0.098–0.138 in) in diameter.

== Taxonomy ==
This species was first formally described in 1997 by Anthony Bean who gave it the name Babingtonia similis in the journal Austrobaileya from specimens collected near Springbrook in 1994. In 2007, Peter Gordon Wilson transferred the species to Sannantha as S. similis in Australian Systematic Botany. The specific epithet (similis) means "like" or "resembling", referring to this species' similarity to Babingtonia angusta, (now Sannantha angusta).

This species was previously included in Baeckea virgata (J.R.Forst. & G.Forst.) Andrews.

== Distribution and habitat ==
Sannantha similis grows in a range of habitats, including open forest and rainforest margins, from near Brisbane in south-eastern Queensland to near Newcastle in New South Wales.
