= Triplarina paludosa =

Scientific classification
- Kingdom: Plantae
- Clade: Tracheophytes
- Clade: Angiosperms
- Clade: Eudicots
- Clade: Rosids
- Order: Myrtales
- Family: Myrtaceae
- Genus: Triplarina
- Species: T. paludosa

Binomial name
- Triplarina paludosa A.R.Bean

Species of flowering plant

Triplarina paludosa is a species of flowering plant in the myrtle family and is endemic to the Blackdown Tableland in Queensland, Australia. It is a shrub with lance-shaped to linear leaves, flowers with five sepals, five white petals and fifteen to eighteen stamens.

== Description ==
Triplarina paludosa is a shrub that typically grows to a height of 0.9–1.5 m (2 ft 11 in – 4 ft 11 in) and has a fibrous bark. The leaves are lance-shaped to linear, 4.0–6.5 mm (0.16–0.26 in) long and 0.6–1.0 mm (0.024–0.039 in) wide on a petiole about 0.5 mm (0.020 in) long. The flowers are arranged in leaf axils in pairs on a peduncle 0.8–1.0 mm (0.031–0.039 in) long. Each flower is 4.5–5.0 mm (0.18–0.20 in) in diameter with bracts about 0.6 mm (0.024 in) long. The sepal lobes are about more or less round, about 0.6 mm (0.024 in) long and 0.7 mm (0.028 in) wide, the petals white, 1.4–1.8 mm (0.055–0.071 in) long. There are fifteen to eighteen stamens on filaments about 1.0 mm (0.039 in) long. Flowering has been recorded in November and the fruit is a hemispherical capsule about 1.7 mm (0.067 in) long.

== Taxonomy and naming ==
Triplarina paludosa was first formally described by Anthony Bean in 1995 and the description was published in the journal Austrobaileya from specimens he collected near Horseshoe Lookout on the Blackdown Tableland in 1993. The specific epithet (paludosa) means "marshy", referring to the species' habitat preference.

== Distribution and habitat ==
This triplarina is endemic to the Blackdown Tableland where it grows near creeks and seepage areas in open forest and woodland.

== Conservation status ==
Triplarina paludosa is classified as of "least concern" under the Queensland Government Nature Conservation Act 1992.
