= Walsholaria cuneifolia =

Scientific classification
- Kingdom: Plantae
- Clade: Tracheophytes
- Clade: Angiosperms
- Clade: Eudicots
- Clade: Asterids
- Order: Asterales
- Family: Asteraceae
- Genus: Walsholaria
- Species: W. cuneifolia

Binomial name
- Walsholaria cuneifolia (A.R.Bean & M.T.Mathieson) G.L.Nesom

Synonyms
- Olearia cuneifolia A.R.Bean & M.T.Mathieson

Species of shrub

Walsholaria cuneifolia is a species of flowering plant in the family Asteraceae and is endemic to Queensland. It is an erect shrub with lance-shaped to wedge-shaped leaves and white, daisy-like inflorescences.

== Description ==
Walsholaria cuneifolia is an erect shrub that typically grows to a height of up to 2 m (6 ft 7 in) high, its stems covered with glandular hairs and sticky. The leaves arranged alternately, sessile, wedge-shaped to lance-shaped with the narrower end towards the base, 8–15 mm (0.31–0.59 in) long, 2.0–5.2 mm (0.079–0.205 in) wide and more or less glabrous. The heads or daisy-like "flowers" are arranged singly on the ends of branchlets and are sessile with an involucre 14–16 mm (0.55–0.63 in) long and 7–9 mm (0.28–0.35 in) wide at the base. Each head has 14 to 21 ray florets, the ligules white, 17–19 mm (0.67–0.75 in) long, surrounding 28–42 disc florets. Flowering has been observed in March, May, September and October and the fruit is a silky-hairy achene, the pappus with creamy-white bristles in two rows.

== Taxonomy and naming ==
The species was first formally described as Olearia cuneifolia by Anthony Bean and Michael T. Mathieson in 2015 in the journal Austrobaileya from specimens collected by Mathieson near Mungallala. The specific epithet (cuneifolia) refers to the wedge-shaped leaves. In 2020 Guy L. Nesom placed the species in the newly described genus Walsholaria as W. cuneifolia after Olearia had been found to be polyphyletic.

== Distribution and habitat ==
This daisy bush grows in forest and woodland between Roma and Charleville in north Queensland.

== Conservation status ==
Walsholaria cuneifolia is listed as of "least concern" under the Queensland Government Nature Conservation Act 1992.
