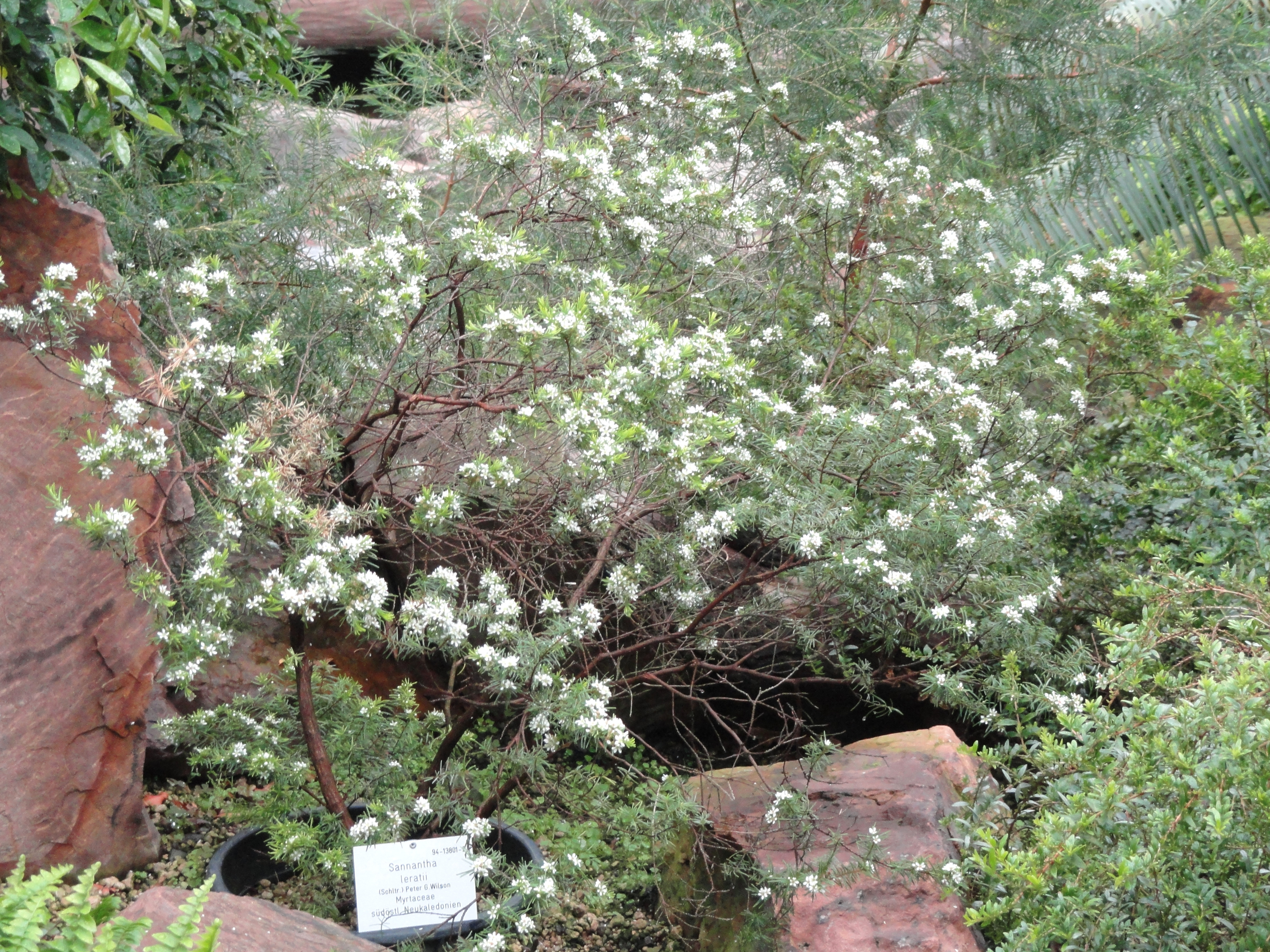
- Sannantha leratii in the Palmengarten

Scientific classification
- Kingdom: Plantae
- Clade: Embryophytes
- Clade: Tracheophytes
- Clade: Spermatophytes
- Clade: Angiosperms
- Clade: Eudicots
- Clade: Rosids
- Order: Myrtales
- Family: Myrtaceae
- Subfamily: Myrtoideae
- Tribe: Chamelaucieae
- Genus: Sannantha; Peter G.Wilson

Species
- See list

= Sannantha =

Genus of shrubs

Sannantha is a genus of flowering plants in the family Myrtaceae that are native to Australia and New Caledonia. Plants in the genus Sannantha are shrubs or trees with leaves arranged in opposite pairs, flowers usually arranged in small groups, the peduncles often 1.5–2 times as long as the pedicels and with seven to fourteen stamens. The fruit is a thin-walled capsule containing flattened, D-shaped seeds. Some species of Sannantha were previously included in the genus Babingtonia.

The genus Sannantha was first formally described in 2007 by Peter Gordon Wilson in Australian Systematic Botany and the first species he described (the type species) was Sannantha virgata.

== Species list ==
The following is a list of Sannantha species accepted by Plants of the World Online as at March 2022:

- Sannantha angusta (A.R.Bean) Peter G.Wilson (New South Wales, Queensland)
- Sannantha bidwillii (A.R.Bean) Peter G.Wilson (Queensland)
- Sannantha brachypoda (A.R.Bean) Peter G.Wilson (Queensland)
- Sannantha collina (A.R.Bean) Peter G.Wilson (New South Wales, Queensland)
- Sannantha crassa (A.R.Bean) Peter G.Wilson (New South Wales)
- Sannantha crenulata (F.Muell.) Peter G.Wilson - fern-leaf baeckea (Victoria)
- Sannantha cunninghamii (Schauer) Peter G.Wilson (New South Wales)
- Sannantha leratii (Schltr.) Peter G.Wilson (New Caledonia)
- Sannantha papillosa (A.R.Bean) Peter G.Wilson (Queensland)
- Sannantha pinifolia (Labill.) Peter G.Wilson (New Caledonia)
- Sannantha pluriflora (F.Muell.) Peter G.Wilson - tall baeckea (New South Wales, Victoria)
- Sannantha procera (J.W.Dawson) Peter G.Wilson (New Caledonia)
- Sannantha similis (A.R.Bean) Peter G.Wilson (New South Wales, Queensland)
- Sannantha tozerensis (A.R.Bean) Peter G.Wilson (Queensland)
- Sannantha virgata (J.R.Forst. & G.Forst.) Peter G.Wilson (New Caledonia)
- Sannantha whitei Peter G.Wilson (New South Wales)
