= Bugong National Park =

National park in Australia

- IUCN category Ia (strict nature reserve)
- Location within New South Wales Location within Australia
- Nearest city: Nowra
- Coordinates: 34.812°S 150.452°E
- Area: 10.22 square kilometres (3.95 mi^{2})
- Established: 1st January, 2001
- Governing body: NSW National Parks and Wildlife Service
- Website: https://www.nationalparks.nsw.gov.au/visit-a-park/parks/bugong-national-park

Bugong National Park is a national park in New South Wales, Australia, 14 km northwest of Nowra. The park is in the traditional country of the Jerrinja Tribe. The park was created in 2001, alongside the Tapitallee Nature Reserve, as part of the southern New South Wales Regional Forest Agreement. Previously, the park was Crown land. The park is connected to Morton National Park via Crown land. It is currently 1022 hectares although it may be expanded in the future.

On 1 January, 2001, Bugong and Tallaganda National Parks were designated as the 153rd and 154th National Parks in New South Wales.

== Description ==
The park consists of two disjunct parts: a small northern section and a much larger southern section. About half of the park is a small plateau below the Cambewarra range with the rest being steeply sloping valleys. The park contains parts of the Bugong Creek, Kellets Creek and the Shoalhaven River.

There are currently no visitor facilities in the park, although a campground and visitor center are planned to be built at the site of a former quarry on Lower Bugong Road. Horse riding and cycling are permitted on roads and some tracks within the park. Bushwalking is the most popular activity with additional tracks to be constructed.

== Flora and Fauna ==
=== Flora ===
The park contains a large variety of plants in a variety of wet and dry forest types. The endangered Nowra heath myrtle may be found in the park.

Invasive mistflower is found along Bugong Creek and may displace native plants.

=== Fauna ===
Over 60 bird, 24 mammal, 16 reptile and 12 amphibian species are found within the park. The rockwarbler, the only bird restricted to New South Wales, is found within the park.

The endangered broad-headed snake is found within the park. The park also protects 14 vulnerable species: the greater sooty owl, glossy black cockatoo, gang-gang cockatoo, little lorikeet, koala, yellow-bellied glider, spotted-tail quoll, long-nosed potoroo, eastern freetail-bat, greater broad-nosed bat, large-eared pied bat, grey-headed flying fox, Rosenberg's monitor and giant burrowing frog.

Invasive mammals including foxes, wild dogs, rabbits, deer and goats are known to occur in the park.

The endangered brush-tailed rock-wallaby was found in the park until 1999 when it was extirpated, primarily due to predation from foxes. If the invasive foxes can be controlled, the park would be a suitable site for reintroduction.
