= S. collina =

S. collina may refer to:

- Shorea collina, species of tree
- Serruria collina, species of flower-bearing shrub
- Sannantha collina, species of flowering plants
