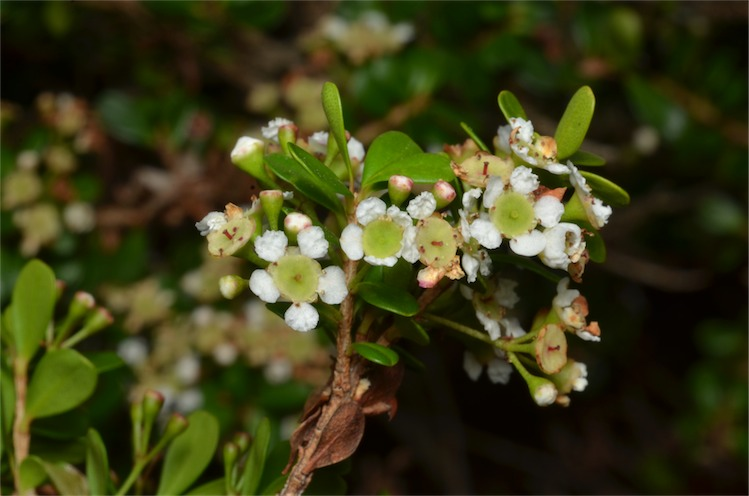
- In Mount Annan Botanic Garden

Scientific classification
- Kingdom: Plantae
- Clade: Tracheophytes
- Clade: Angiosperms
- Clade: Eudicots
- Clade: Rosids
- Order: Myrtales
- Family: Myrtaceae
- Genus: Sannantha
- Species: S. tozerensis

Binomial name
- Sannantha tozerensis (A.R.Bean) Peter G.Wilson

Synonyms
- Babingtonia tozerensis A.R.Bean; Baeckea 'Mt Tozer'; Baeckea sp. 'Mt Tozer' (L.J.Brass 19348); Baeckea sp. (Tozer Range L.J.Brass 19348); Baeckea sp. Mt Tozer (L.J.Brass 19348)

= Sannantha tozerensis =

Species of flowering plant

Sannantha tozerensis is a species of flowering plant in the myrtle family, Myrtaceae and is endemic to a small area of Cape York Peninsula in north Queensland. It is a shrub with elliptic to egg-shaped leaves, the narrower end towards the base, and white flowers arranged in groups of three or seven in leaf axils.

== Description ==
Sannantha tozerensis is a shrub that typically grows to a height of up to 2 m (6 ft 7 in) and has grey, scaly bark. Its leaves are elliptic to egg-shaped, the narrower end towards the base, 7.2–11.5 mm (0.28–0.45 in) long and 3.0–6.5 mm (0.12–0.26 in) wide on a yellow petiole 1.5–1.8 mm (0.059–0.071 in) long. The flowers are up to 9.5 mm (0.37 in) in diameter and arranged in groups of three or seven in leaf axils on a peduncle 5.0–11.4 mm (0.20–0.45 in) long. Each flower is on a pedicel 3.5–5.0 mm (0.14–0.20 in) long with many bracteoles at the base, but that fall off as the flowers develop. The floral tube is about 2 mm (0.079 in) long, the sepals about 0.8 mm (0.031 in) long and thin. The petals are white, more or less round, 3.0–3.5 mm (0.12–0.14 in) in diameter and there are 10 to 12 stamens. Flowering occurs in most months and the fruit is a hemispherical capsule about 2 mm (0.079 in) long.

== Taxonomy ==
This species was first formally described in 1997 by Anthony Bean who gave it the name Babingtonia tozerensis in the journal Austrobaileya from specimens collected on Mount Tozer in the Iron Range National Park in 1948. In 2007, Peter Gordon Wilson transferred the species to Sannantha as S. tozerensis in Australian Systematic Botany. The specific epithet, (tozerensis) refers to the type location, on Mount Tozer.

== Distribution and habitat ==
This species of sannantha is only known from the type location, where it grows in rock crevices on the upper slopes of Mount Tozer.
