= S. crenulata =

S. crenulata may refer to:

- Stenomelania crenulata, species of brackish and freshwater snail
- Sebastiania crenulata, species of plant in the family Euphorbiaceae
- Sannantha crenulata, species of flowering plant in the myrtle family
- Scorpaenopsis crenulata, species of venomous marine ray-finned fish
