= Triplarina bancroftii =

Scientific classification
- Kingdom: Plantae
- Clade: Tracheophytes
- Clade: Angiosperms
- Clade: Eudicots
- Clade: Rosids
- Order: Myrtales
- Family: Myrtaceae
- Genus: Triplarina
- Species: T. bancroftii

Binomial name
- Triplarina bancroftii A.R.Bean

Species of flowering plant

Triplarina bancroftii is a species of flowering plant in the myrtle family, Myrtaceae and is endemic to a restricted area of Queensland. It is a shrub with egg-shaped or elliptic leaves, flowers with five sepals and five relatively small white petals and sixteen to eighteen stamens.

== Description ==
Triplarina bancroftii is a shrub that typically grows to a height of 1.5–2.5 m (4 ft 11 in – 8 ft 2 in) and has a grey, scaly bark. The leaves are elliptical or egg-shaped with the narrower end towards the base, 3.3–6.2 mm (0.13–0.24 in) long and 1.2–2.9 mm (0.047–0.114 in) wide on a petiole 0.3–0.5 mm (0.012–0.020 in) long. The flowers are arranged in leaf axils in pairs or threes on a peduncle 0.8–1.4 mm (0.031–0.055 in) long. Each flower is 4.5–4.8 mm (0.18–0.19 in) in diameter with bracts about 0.6 mm (0.024 in) long. The sepal lobes are 0.4–0.5 mm (0.016–0.020 in) long and 0.8–1.0 mm (0.031–0.039 in) wide with a rounded tip and the petals are white, 1.4–1.8 mm (0.055–0.071 in) long and 1.6–1.9 mm (0.063–0.075 in) wide. There are sixteen to eighteen stamens on filaments 0.8–0.9 mm (0.031–0.035 in) long. Flowering has been recorded in October and November and the fruit is a hemispherical capsule 1.5–1.7 mm (0.059–0.067 in) long.

== Taxonomy and naming ==
Triplarina bancroftii was first formally described by Anthony Bean in 1995 and the description was published in the journal Austrobaileya from specimens he collected in Cania Gorge National Park in 1993. The specific epithet (bancroftii) honours Thomas Lane Bancroft, the first person to collect this species.

== Distribution and habitat ==
This triplarina is only known from two populations, one in the Cania Gorge National Park and the other 80 km (50 mi) south. It grows in sandy soil with species such as Lophostemon confertus and L. suaveolens.

== Conservation status ==
Triplarina bancroftii is classified as of "least concern" under the Queensland Government Nature Conservation Act 1992.
