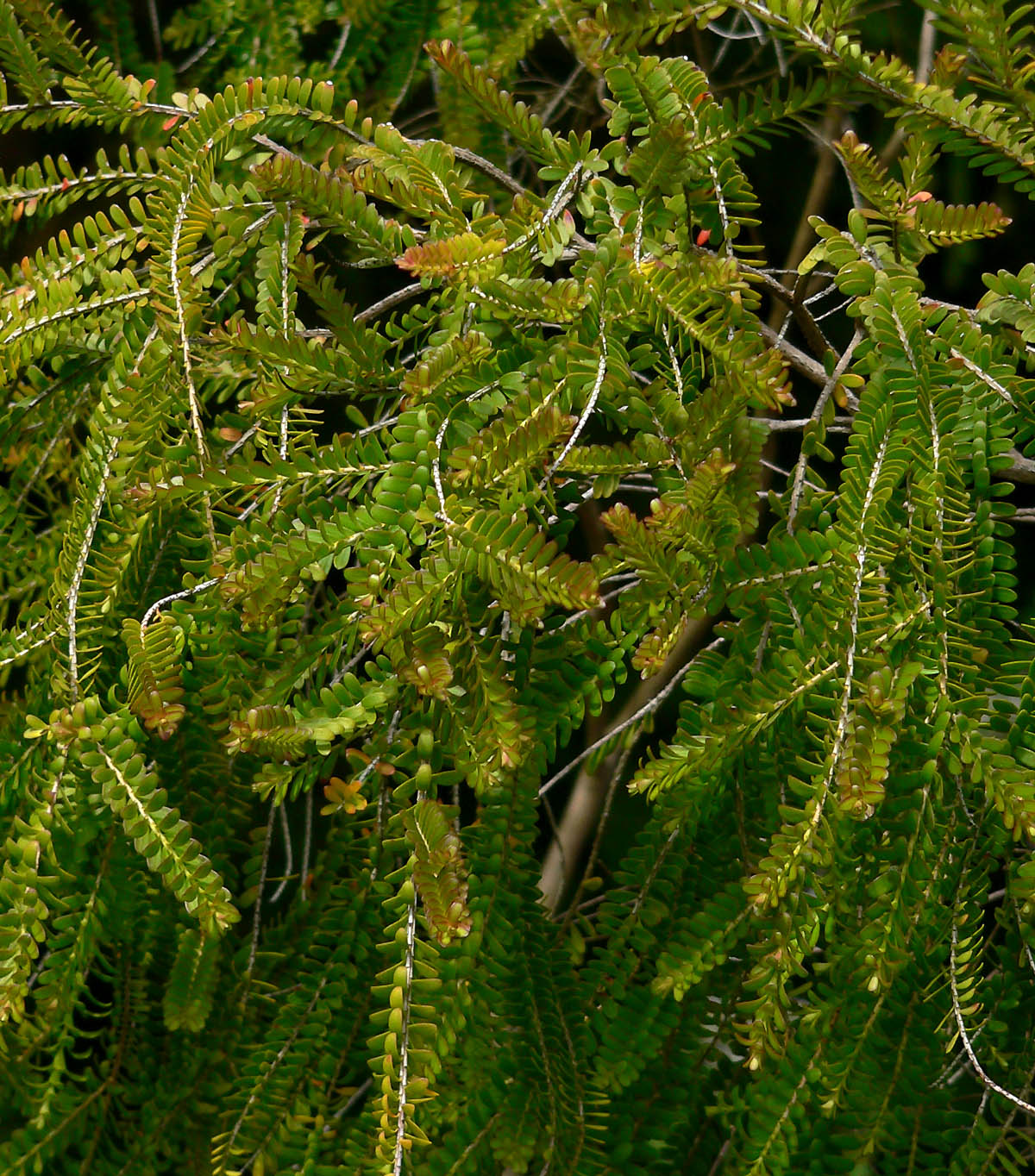
- Triplarina imbricata in San Francisco Botanical Garden

Scientific classification
- Kingdom: Plantae
- Clade: Tracheophytes
- Clade: Angiosperms
- Clade: Eudicots
- Clade: Rosids
- Order: Myrtales
- Family: Myrtaceae
- Genus: Triplarina
- Species: T. imbricata

Binomial name
- Triplarina imbricata (Sm.) A.R.Bean

Synonyms
- Baeckea camphorata R.Br. ex Sims; Camphoromyrtus brownii Schauer nom. illeg.; Eremopyxis camphorata (R.Br. ex Sims) Baill.; Leptospermum imbricatum Sm.; Triplarina camphorata (R.Br. ex Sims) Raf.

= Triplarina imbricata =

Creek triplarina

Species of flowering plant

Triplarina imbricata, commonly known as creek triplarina, is a species of flowering plant in the myrtle family, Myrtaceae and is endemic to northern New South Wales. It is a shrub with weeping branches, narrow egg-shaped leaves, and flowers in pairs with five sepals, five relatively small white petals and fourteen to seventeen stamens.

== Description ==
Triplarina imbricata is a shrub that typically grows to a height of up to 2.8 m (9 ft 2 in) and has a grey, scaly or fibrous bark. The leaves are narrow egg-shaped with the narrower end towards the base, 2.6–3.9 mm (0.10–0.15 in) long and 1.0–1.4 mm (0.039–0.055 in) wide on a petiole 0.4–0.6 mm (0.016–0.024 in) long. The flowers are arranged in leaf axils in pairs on a peduncle 0.8–1.5 mm (0.031–0.059 in) long. Each flower is about 4 mm (0.16 in) in diameter with bracts about 0.5 mm (0.020 in) long. The sepal lobes are 0.5–0.7 mm (0.020–0.028 in) long and 0.8–1 mm (0.031–0.039 in) wide and have oil dots. The petals are white, more or less round, 1.5–1.7 mm (0.059–0.067 in) long and 1.3–1.7 mm (0.051–0.067 in) wide. There are fourteen to seventeen stamens on filaments about 0.6 mm (0.024 in) long and the ovary has three locules. Flowering has been recorded in November and December and the fruit is a hemispherical capsule 1.7 mm (0.067 in) long and 2.4 mm (0.094 in) wide.

== Taxonomy and naming ==
This species was first formally described by James Edward Smith in 1802 and given the name Leptospermum imbricatum in the Transactions of the Linnean Society of London from specimens collected in 1791 by David Binton near Port Jackson.

In 1826, John Sims described the species as Baeckea camphorata in the Botanical Magazine from an unpublished description by Robert Brown, but noted that "this species [has] as good a right to rank with Leptospermum as with Baeckia, which has been considered to have five or eight stamens".

In 1838, Rafinesque described the genus Triplarina, changing the name Baeckea camphorata to Triplarina camphorata in his book Sylva Telluriana, noting it had "fifteen stamens". In 1843, Schauer, apparently unaware of Rafinesque's publication, described Camphoromyrtus brownii, also based on B. camphorata in Linnaea: ein Journal für die Botanik in ihrem ganzen Umfange, oder Beiträge zur Pflanzenkunde but the name was illegitimate.

In 1995, Anthony Bean reinstated the genus Triplarina, based the name T. imbricata on Sims's Leptospermum imbricatum, and considered Baeckea camphorata to be a synonym of Triplarina camphorata.

== Distribution and habitat ==
This triplarina occurs in the Tabulam and Nymboida districts where it grows in heath, often in damp places.

== Conservation status ==
Triplarina imbricata is classified as "endangered" under the Australian Government Environment Protection and Biodiversity Conservation Act 1999 and the New South Wales Government Biodiversity Conservation Act 2016. The main threats to the species include habitat loss, weed invasion and trampling by domestic livestock.
