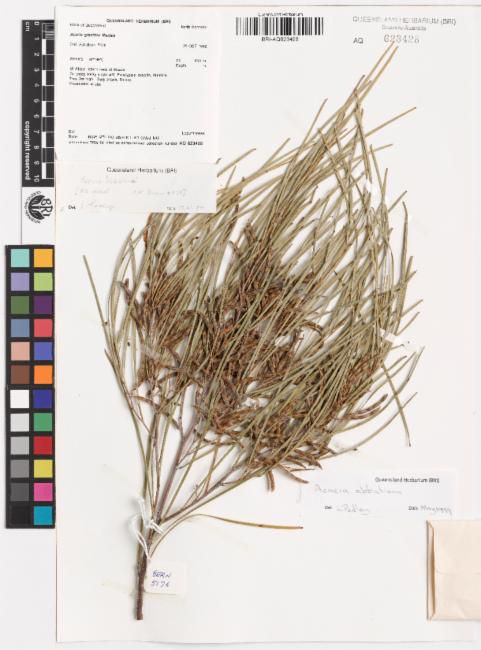
- Type specimen

Scientific classification
- Kingdom: Plantae
- Clade: Tracheophytes
- Clade: Angiosperms
- Clade: Eudicots
- Clade: Rosids
- Order: Fabales
- Family: Fabaceae
- Subfamily: Caesalpinioideae
- Clade: Mimosoid clade
- Genus: Acacia
- Species: A. abbatiana

Binomial name
- Acacia abbatiana Pedley

Synonyms
- Acacia sp. (Mt Abbot A.R.Bean 4873); Racosperma abbatianum (Pedley) Pedley

= Acacia abbatiana =

Species of legume

Acacia abbatiana is a species of flowering plant in the family Fabaceae and is endemic to Mount Abbott in Queensland. It has linear phyllodes, flowers arranged in a spike about 5 mm (0.20 in) in diameter, and a pod up to 35 mm (1.4 in) long.

== Description ==
Acacia abbtiana is a shrub that typically grows to a height of up to about 4 m (13 ft), with fibrous bark and the phyllodes only on the upper parts of the stem. The phyllodes are linear, straight, 95–150 mm (3.7–5.9 in) long and 1.6–3 mm (0.063–0.118 in) wide. The flowers are arranged in spikes 8–9 mm (0.31–0.35 in) wide, two or three in each leaf axil, and about 5 mm (0.20 in) in diameter on peduncle 1–2 mm (0.039–0.079 in) long. The sepals are cup-shaped, 0.5–0.7 mm (0.020–0.028 in) long and the petals 1.3–1.5 mm (0.051–0.059 in) long with stamens 2.0–2.2 mm (0.079–0.087 in) long. Flowering has been observed in August, and the fruit is a pod up to 35 mm (1.4 in) long and 2.5 mm (0.098 in) wide containing up to 8 seeds.

== Taxonomy ==
Acacia abbatiana was first described in 1999 by Leslie Pedley in the journal Astrobaileya from a specimen collected by Anthony Bean on Mount Abbott, about 50 km (31 mi) west of Bowen in 1992. The specific epithet (abbatiana) means "on Abbott", indicating Mount Abbott, the only known locality for this species".

== Distribution and habitat ==
This wattle species is only known from Mount Abbott in central Queensland where it grows in heath on slopes in soil derived from granite.

== Conservation status ==
Acacia abbatiana is listed as of "least concern" by the Queensland Government Department of Environment and Science.

== See also ==
- List of Acacia species
