= Triplarina nitchaga =

Conservation status
- Vulnerable (EPBC Act)

Scientific classification
- Kingdom: Plantae
- Clade: Tracheophytes
- Clade: Angiosperms
- Clade: Eudicots
- Clade: Rosids
- Order: Myrtales
- Family: Myrtaceae
- Genus: Triplarina
- Species: T. nitchaga

Binomial name
- Triplarina nitchaga A.R.Bean

Species of flowering plant

Triplarina nitchaga is a species of flowering plant in the myrtle family, Myrtaceae and is endemic to a restricted area of north Queensland. It is a shrub with lance-shaped leaves with the narrower end towards the base, flowers with five sepals, five white petals and seventeen or eighteen stamens.

== Description ==
Triplarina nitchaga is a shrub that typically grows to a height of up to 2.5 m (8 ft 2 in) and has a grey, scaly bark. The leaves are lance-shaped with the narrower end towards the base, 3.8–5.5 mm (0.15–0.22 in) long and 1.0–1.5 mm (0.039–0.059 in) wide on a petiole 0.4–0.6 mm (0.016–0.024 in) long. The flowers are arranged in leaf axils in pairs or threes on a peduncle 0.8–1.0 mm (0.031–0.039 in) long. Each flower is 4.5–5.0 mm (0.18–0.20 in) in diameter with bracts 0.5–0.6 mm (0.020–0.024 in) long. The sepal lobes are about 0.5 mm (0.020 in) long and 0.8–1.0 mm (0.031–0.039 in) wide and more or less round and the petals are white and 1.5–2.0 mm (0.059–0.079 in) wide. There are seventeen or eighteen stamens on filaments about 1.2 mm (0.047 in) long. Flowering has been recorded in September and October and the fruit is a hemispherical to conical capsule 1.6–1.9 mm (0.063–0.075 in) long.

== Taxonomy and naming ==
Triplarina nitchaga was first formally described by Anthony Bean in 1995 and the description was published in the journal Austrobaileya from specimens collected near Nitchaga Creek near Ravenshoe in 1994. The specific epithet (nitchaga) refers to the type location.

== Distribution and habitat ==
This triplarina is only known from two localities near Ravenshoe where it grows in open forest.

== Conservation status ==
Triplarina nitchaga is classified as "vulnerable" under the Australian Government Environment Protection and Biodiversity Conservation Act 1999 and the Queensland Government Nature Conservation Act 1992.
