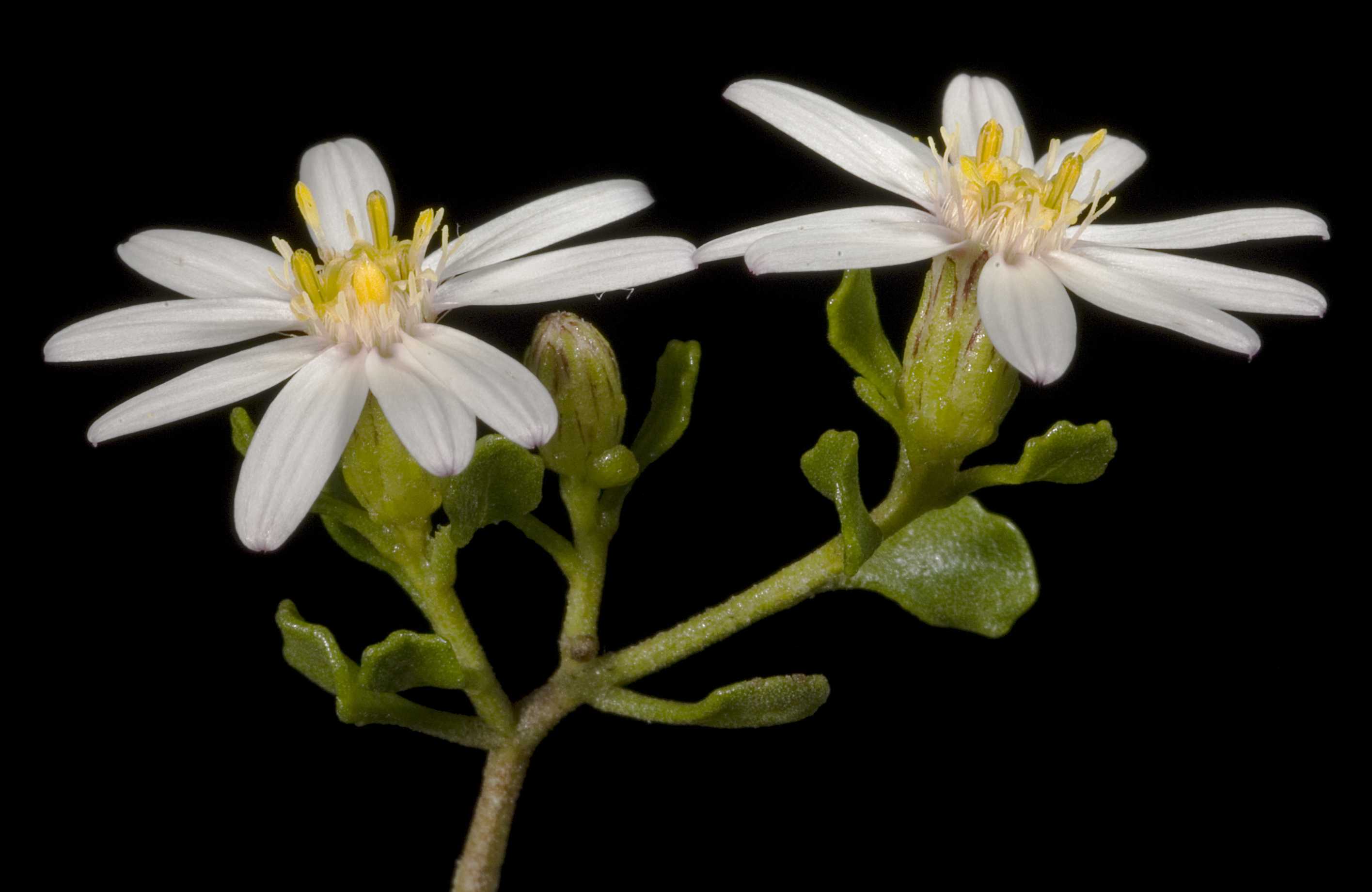

Scientific classification
- Kingdom: Plantae
- Clade: Embryophytes
- Clade: Tracheophytes
- Clade: Angiosperms
- Clade: Eudicots
- Clade: Asterids
- Order: Asterales
- Family: Asteraceae
- Genus: Walsholaria
- Species: W. muelleri

Binomial name
- Walsholaria muelleri (Sond.) G.L.Nesom

Synonyms
- Aster muelleri (Sond.) F.Muell.; Eurybia muelleri Sond.; Olearia muelleri (Sond.) Benth.

= Walsholaria muelleri =

Species of flowering plant

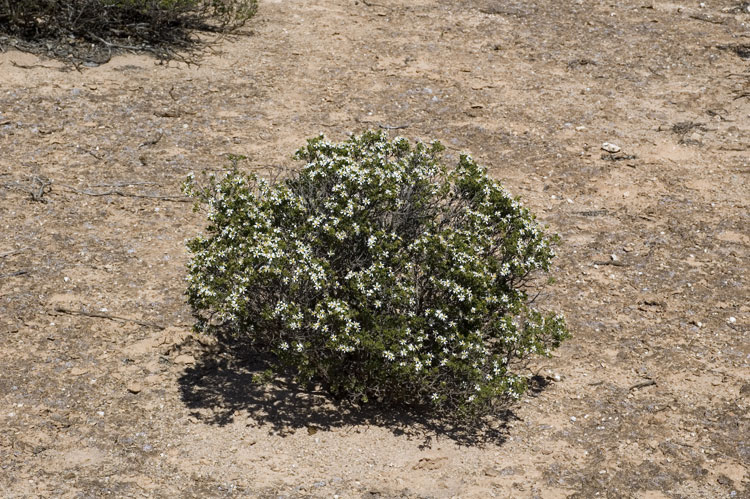
Habit on the Nullarbor Plain

Walsholaria muelleri, commonly known as Mueller daisy bush, Mueller's daisy bush or Goldfields daisy, is a species of flowering plant in the family Asteraceae and is endemic to southern continental Australia. It is a compact or spreading shrub with scattered spatula-shaped to egg-shaped leaves with the narrower end towards the base, and white and yellow, daisy-like inflorescences.

== Description ==
Walsholaria muelleri is a compact or spreading shrub that typically grows to a height of 0.4–1.5 m (1 ft 4 in – 4 ft 11 in) and has sticky branchlets and leaves. The leaves are arranged alternately, scattered along the branchlets, spatula-shaped to egg-shaped with the narrower end towards the base, 5–14 mm (0.20–0.55 in) long and 2–8 mm (0.079–0.315 in) wide sometimes with toothed or wavy edges. The heads or daisy-like "flowers" are arranged singly on the ends of branches and are more or less sessile or on a peduncle up to 10 mm (0.39 in) long. There is a bell-shaped involucre at the base with four to eight rows of sticky bracts. Each head has seven to thirteen white ray florets, the ligule 4–15 mm (0.16–0.59 in) long, surrounding twelve to eighteen yellow disc florets. Flowering occurs from August to October and the fruit is a silky-hairy achene, the pappus with forty to fifty bristles.

== Taxonomy ==
Mueller daisy bush was first formally described in 1853 by Otto Wilhelm Sonder, who gave it the name Eurybia muelleri in Linnaea: ein Journal für die Botanik in ihrem ganzen Umfange, oder Beiträge zur Pflanzenkunde. The specific epithet (muelleri) honours Ferdinand von Mueller. In 1867, George Bentham changed the name to Olearia muelleri in Flora Australiensis. In 2020 Guy L. Nesom placed the species in the newly-described genus Walsholaria as W. muelleri after Olearia had been found to be polyphyletic.

== Distribution and habitat ==
Walsholaria muelleri grows in mallee woodlands or spinifex communities and is widespread in the south-west of Western Australia, the south of South Australia, north-western Victoria and the far south-west of New South Wales.
