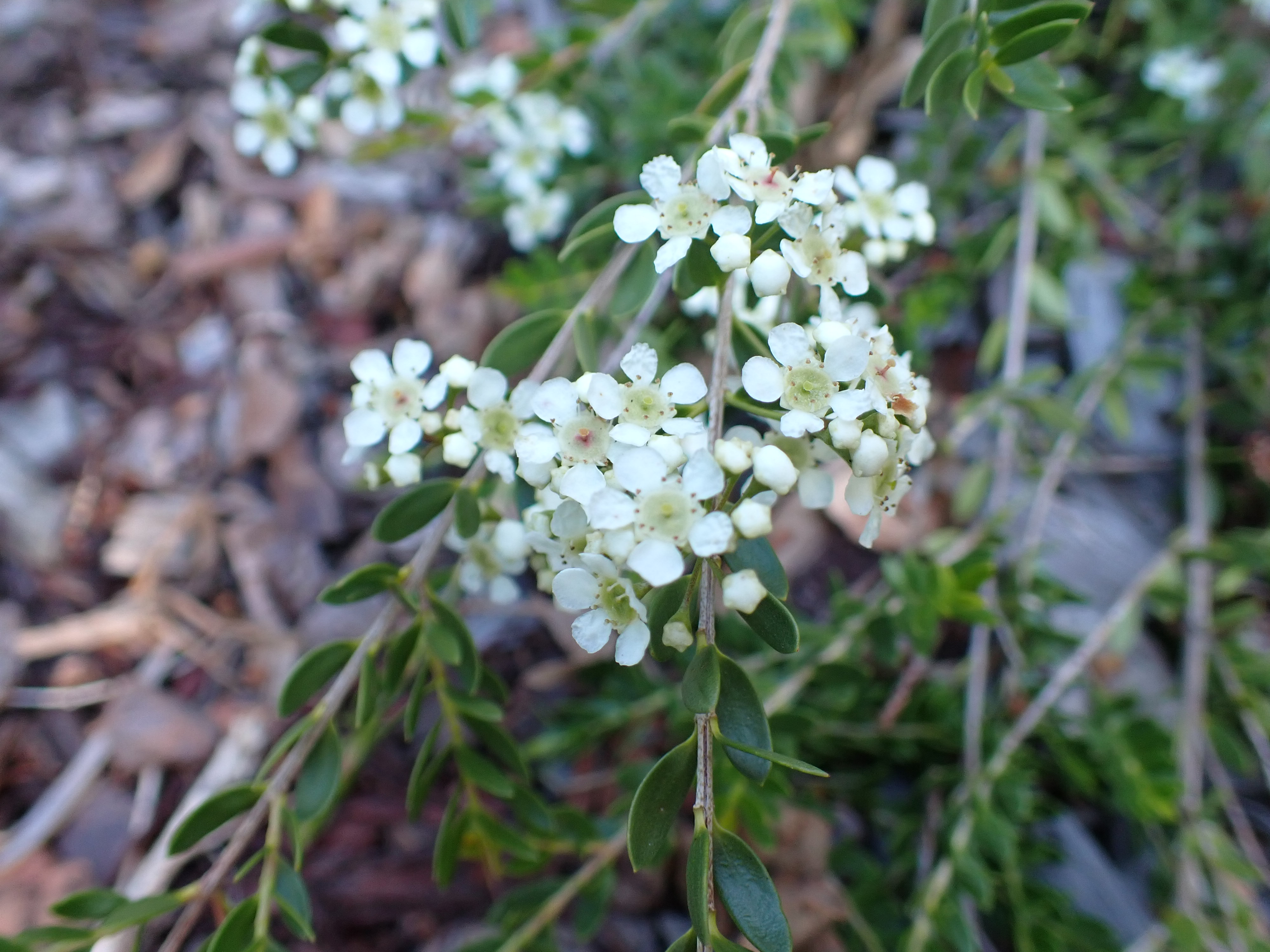

Scientific classification
- Kingdom: Plantae
- Clade: Tracheophytes
- Clade: Angiosperms
- Clade: Eudicots
- Clade: Rosids
- Order: Myrtales
- Family: Myrtaceae
- Genus: Sannantha
- Species: S. crassa

Binomial name
- Sannantha crassa (A.R.Bean) Peter G.Wilson

Synonyms
- Babingtonia crassa A.R.Bean

= Sannantha crassa =

Species of flowering plant

Sannantha crassa is a species in the myrtle family, Myrtaceae and is endemic to eastern Australia. It is a shrub with elliptic to lance-shaped leaves and groups of 7 to 9 white flowers arranged in leaf axils.

== Description ==
Sannantha crassa is a shrub that typically grows to a height of up to 2.5 m (8 ft 2 in) and has grey, scaly bark. Its leaves are elliptic to lance-shaped, 7–13 mm (0.28–0.51 in) long and 2.5–3.5 mm (0.098–0.138 in) wide on a petiole 1.0–1.5 mm (0.039–0.059 in) long. The flowers are up to 7 mm (0.28 in) in diameter and arranged in leaf axils in groups of 7 to 9 on a peduncle 7–11 mm (0.28–0.43 in) long. Each flower is on a pedicel 2–4 mm (0.079–0.157 in) long with 2 bracts at the base, but that fall off as the flowers develop. The floral tube is 2.0–2.5 mm (0.079–0.098 in) long, the sepal lobes 0.4 mm (0.016 in) long and thin. The petals are white, 2.0–2.8 mm (0.079–0.110 in) long and wide and there are 8 to 11 stamens. Flowering has been observed in January and February and the fruit is a bell-shaped to hemispherical capsule 2.5–3.0 mm (0.098–0.118 in) in diameter.

== Taxonomy ==
This species was first formally described in 1999 by Anthony Bean who gave it the name Babingtonia crassa in the journal Austrobaileya from specimens he collected at Dangars Falls in 1995. In 2007, Peter Gordon Wilson changed the name to Sannantha crassa in Australian Systematic Botany. The specific epithet (crassa) means "thick", referring to the leaves.

== Distribution and habitat ==
Sannantha crassa grows in rocky places on steep slopes on the eastern edge of the Northern Tablelands from near Armidale to southern Barrington Tops in eastern New South Wales.
