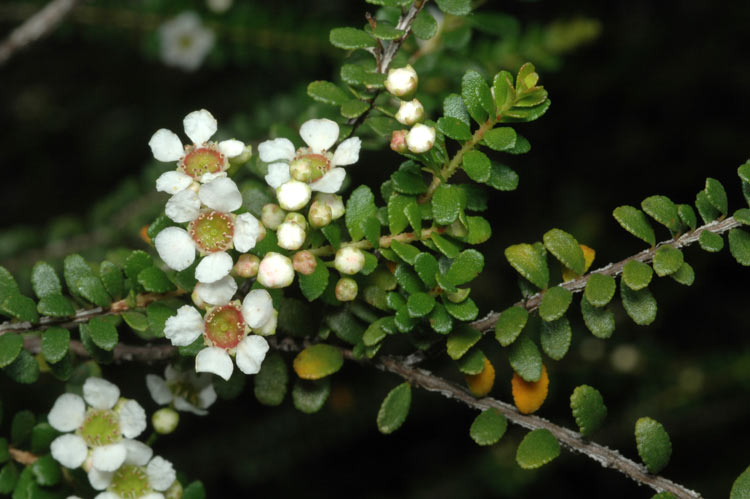
- In the Australian National Botanic Gardens

Conservation status
- Vulnerable (EPBC Act)

Scientific classification
- Kingdom: Plantae
- Clade: Tracheophytes
- Clade: Angiosperms
- Clade: Eudicots
- Clade: Rosids
- Order: Myrtales
- Family: Myrtaceae
- Genus: Sannantha
- Species: S. crenulata

Binomial name
- Sannantha crenulata (A.R.Bean) Peter G.Wilson

Synonyms
- Babingtonia crenulata (F.Muell.) A.R.Bean; Baeckea crenatifolia F.Muell.; Baeckea crenulata (F.Muell.) Druce nom. illeg., nom. superfl.; Camphoromyrtus crenulata F.Muell. nom. inval., nom. nud.; Camphoromyrtus crenulata F.Muell.; Camphoromyrtus crenulata F.Muell. isonym; Camphyromyrtus crenulata F.Muell. orth. var.; Harmogia crenulata Miq.

= Sannantha crenulata =

Species of flowering plant

Sannantha crenulata, commonly known as fern-leaf baeckea, is a species of flowering plant in the myrtle family, Myrtaceae and is endemic to a restricted part of Victoria in Australia. It is an erect shrub with egg-shaped to round leaves with scalloped edges, and groups of usually 3 white flowers arranged in leaf axils.

== Description ==
Sannantha crenulata is an erect shrub that typically grows to a height of 1–3 m (3 ft 3 in – 9 ft 10 in). Its leaves are egg-shaped to round, 3–7 mm (0.12–0.28 in) long and 2–5 mm (0.079–0.197 in) wide on a petiole 0.6–0.9 mm (0.024–0.035 in) long. The edges of the leaves are minutely scalloped. The flowers are up to 8 mm (0.31 in) in diameter and arranged in leaf axils, usually in groups of 3 on a peduncle 4–10.5 mm (0.16–0.41 in) long. Each flower is on a pedicel 5.3–8.5 mm (0.21–0.33 in) long with many bracteoles at the base, but that fall off as the flowers develop. The floral tube is 1.6–1.9 mm (0.063–0.075 in) long, the sepal lobes 0.6–0.9 mm (0.024–0.035 in) long and thin. The petals are white, 3.0–3.5 mm (0.12–0.14 in) long and wide and there are 12 to 14 stamens. Flowering has been observed from November to March and the fruit is a hemispherical capsule 2–3 mm (0.079–0.118 in) in diameter.

== Taxonomy ==
This species was first formally described in 1855 by Ferdinand von Mueller who gave it the name Camphoromyrtus crenulata in his book Definitions of rare or hitherto undescribed Australian plants from specimens collected on "springs and rivulets of the Buffalo Ranges". In 2007, Peter Gordon Wilson transferred the species to Sannantha as S. crenulata in Australian Systematic Botany. The specific epithet (crenulata) means "crenulate".

== Distribution and habitat ==
Fern-leaf baeckea is only known from the lower parts of Mount Buffalo in north-eastern Victoria, where it grows on rocky streamsides in open forest and scrub.

== Conservation status ==
Sannantha crenulata is listed as "vulnerable" under the Australian Government Environment Protection and Biodiversity Conservation Act 1999 and as "endangered" under the Victorian Government Flora and Fauna Guarantee Act 1988. The main threats to the species include weed invasion, inappropriate fire regimes, and road works.
