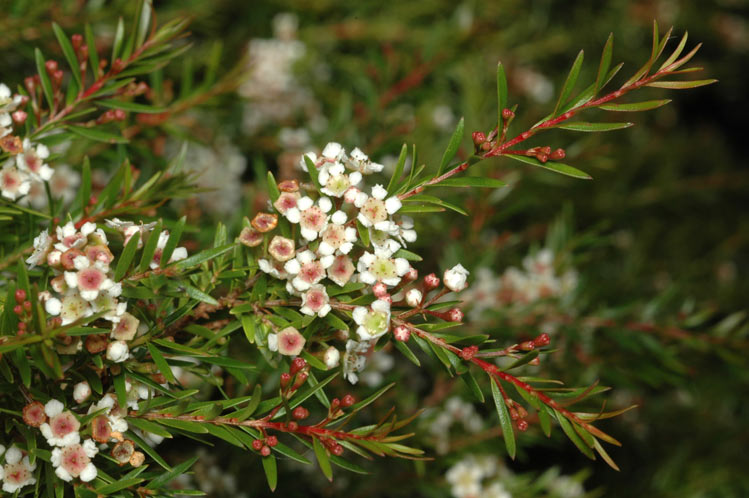
- In the Australian National Botanic Gardens

Conservation status
- Least Concern (IUCN 3.1)

Scientific classification
- Kingdom: Plantae
- Clade: Tracheophytes
- Clade: Angiosperms
- Clade: Eudicots
- Clade: Rosids
- Order: Myrtales
- Family: Myrtaceae
- Genus: Sannantha
- Species: S. bidwillii

Binomial name
- Sannantha bidwillii (A.R.Bean) Peter G.Wilson

Synonyms
- Babingtonia bidwillii A.R.Bean; Baeckea virgata var. parvula F.M.Bailey nom. inval. nom. nud.; Babingtonia sp. (Yurol A.R.Bean 6803)

= Sannantha bidwillii =

Species of flowering plant

Sannantha bidwillii is a species in the myrtle family, Myrtaceae, and is endemic to coastal Queensland in Australia. It is a shrub or tree with elliptic to egg-shaped leaves with the narrower end towards the base, and clusters of 3 white flowers.

== Description ==
Sannantha bidwillii is a shrub or tree that typically grows to a height of up to 5 m (16 ft) and has scaly to fibrous bark. It leaves are elliptic to egg-shaped with the narrower end towards the base, 4.5–7.0 mm (0.18–0.28 in) long and 1.3–2.0 mm (0.051–0.079 in) wide on a petiole 0.6–1.0 mm (0.024–0.039 in) long. The flowers are arranged in leaf axils, usually in clusters of 3 on a peduncle 4.5–8 mm (0.18–0.31 in) long, each flower on a pedicel 3.0–4.5 mm (0.12–0.18 in) long with 2 linear bracts at the base, but that fall off as the flowers develop. The floral tube is 1.5–2.0 mm (0.059–0.079 in) long, the sepal lobes 0.4–2 mm (0.016–0.079 in) long. The petals are 2.2–2.6 mm (0.087–0.102 in) long and 2.0–2.5 mm (0.079–0.098 in) wide and there are usually 7 to 10 stamens. Flowering occurs from October to December and the fruit is a hemispherical, capsule 2.6–3.5 mm (0.10–0.14 in) in diameter.

== Taxonomy ==
This species was by first formally described in 1999 Anthony Bean who gave it the name Babingtonia virgata in the journal Austrobaileya from specimens he collected in the Yurol State Forest near Cooroy in 1993. In 2007, Peter Gordon Wilson changed the name to Sannantha bidwillii in Australian Systematic Botany. The specific epithet (bidwillii) honours John Carne Bidwill, who collected the first known specimen of this species.

== Distribution and habitat ==
Sannantha bidwillii grows in eucalypt forest in coastal lowland between Shoalwater Bay and Brisbane in Queensland.

== Conservation status ==
This species is listed as of "least concern" under the Queensland Government Department of Environment and Science.
