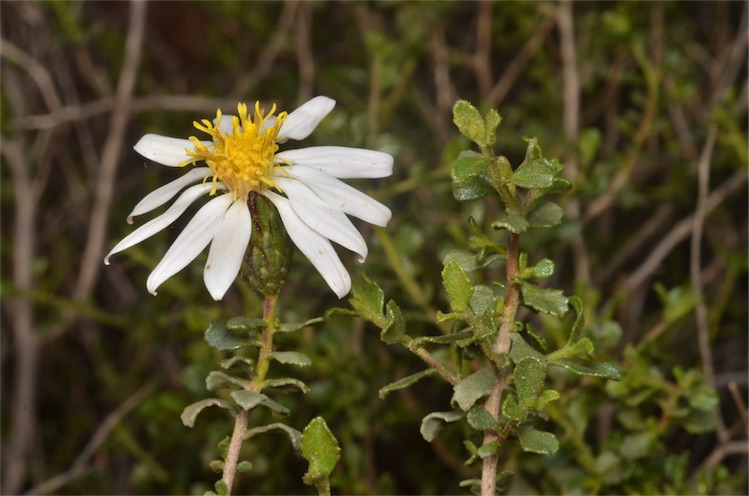
- Walsholaria calcarea in the Gawler Ranges

Scientific classification
- Kingdom: Plantae
- Clade: Tracheophytes
- Clade: Angiosperms
- Clade: Eudicots
- Clade: Asterids
- Order: Asterales
- Family: Asteraceae
- Genus: Walsholaria
- Species: W. calcarea

Binomial name
- Walsholaria calcarea (F.Muell. ex Benth.) G.L.Nesom

Synonyms
- Aster calcareus (F.Muell. ex Benth.) F.Muell.; Olearia calcarea F.Muell. ex Benth

= Walsholaria calcarea =

Limestone daisy bush

Species of shrub

Walsholaria calcarea, commonly known as limestone daisy bush, is a species of flowering plant in the family Asteraceae and is endemic to southern continental Australia. It is a shrub with egg-shaped or broadly spoon-shaped leaves with toothed edges, and white and yellow, daisy-like inflorescences.

== Description ==
Walsholaria calcarea is a shrub that typically grows to a height of up to 80 cm (31 in). It has scattered, broadly spoon-shaped to egg-shaped leaves with the narrower end towards the base, 2–15 mm (0.079–0.591 in) long and 2–5 mm (0.079–0.197 in) wide, with toothed edges. The leaves are more or less sessile, both surfaces a similar colour. The heads are arranged singly on the ends of branchlets and are more or less sessile, 31–45 mm (1.2–1.8 in) in diameter. Each head or daisy-like "flower," has a bell-shaped involucre 12–18 mm (0.47–0.71 in) long, and eight to twelve ray florets, the petal-like ligule oblong, pale purple to white, and 9–15 mm (0.35–0.59 in) long, surrounding ten to fifteen yellow disc florets. Flowering occurs from May to October, and the fruit is a silky-hairy achene, the pappus with 74 to 84 bristles in two rows.

== Taxonomy ==
The species was first formally described as Olearia calcarea by George Bentham in 1867 in Flora Australiensis from an unpublished description by Ferdinand von Mueller. The specific epithet (calcarea) means "limy", referring to the soil. In 2020 Guy L. Nesom placed the species in the newly-described genus Walsholaria as W. calcarea after Olearia had been found to be polyphyletic.

== Distribution and habitat ==
Limestone daisy bush grows in on mallee woodland on limestone-rich soils in southern Western Australia, southern South Australia, far north-western Victoria and west of Nymagee in far western New South Wales.
