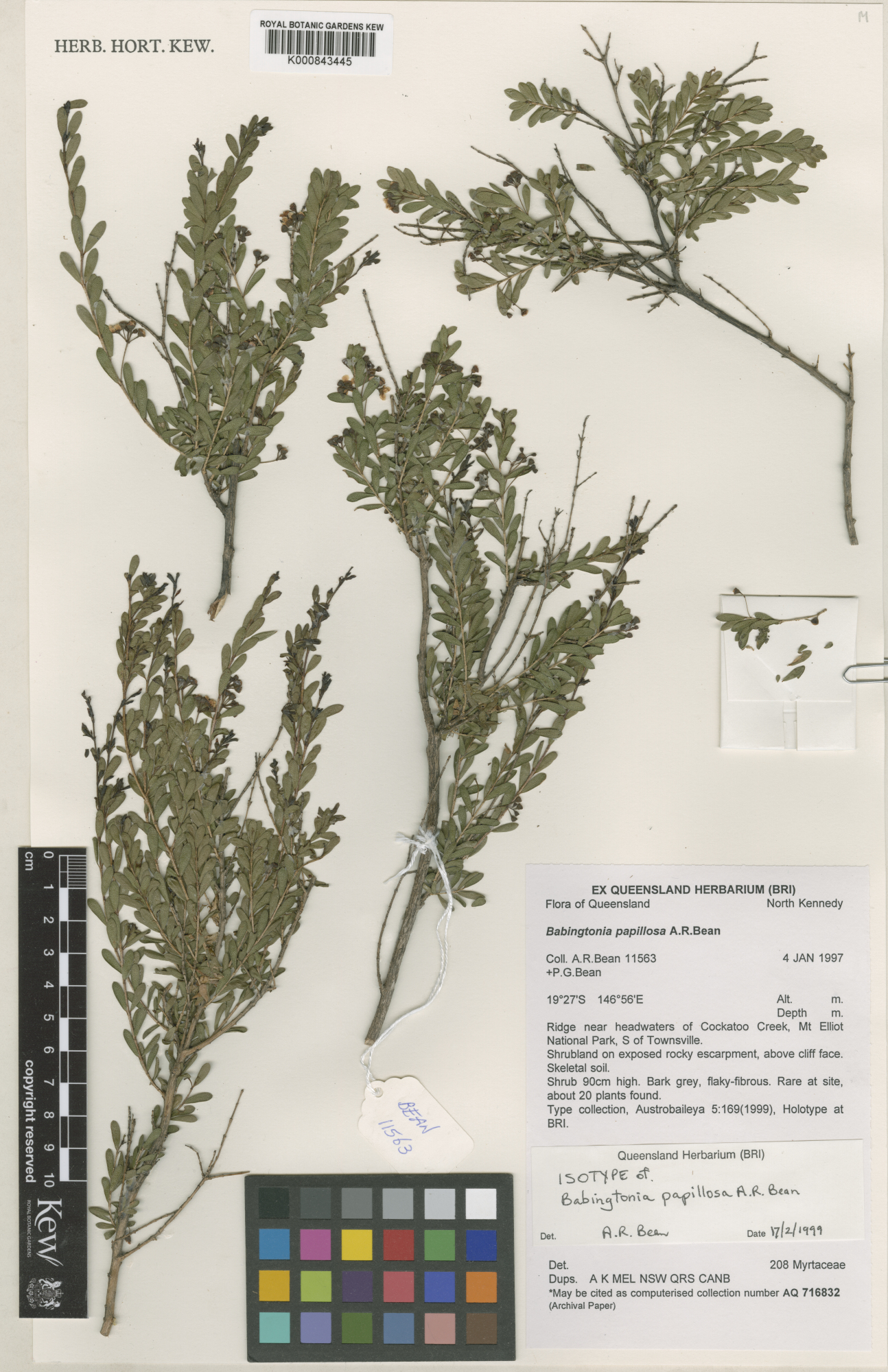

Conservation status
- Vulnerable (NCA)

Scientific classification
- Kingdom: Plantae
- Clade: Tracheophytes
- Clade: Angiosperms
- Clade: Eudicots
- Clade: Rosids
- Order: Myrtales
- Family: Myrtaceae
- Genus: Sannantha
- Species: S. papillosa

Binomial name
- Sannantha papillosa (A.R.Bean) Peter G.Wilson

Synonyms
- Babingtonia papillosa A.R.Bean; Babingtonia sp. (Townsville A.R.Bean 3424)

= Sannantha papillosa =

Species of flowering plant

Sannantha papillosa is a species in the myrtle family, Myrtaceae and is endemic to north Queensland. It is a shrub with egg-shaped leaves, the narrower end towards the base, and groups of usually 7 white flowers arranged in leaf axils.

== Description ==
Sannantha papillosa is a shrub that typically grows to a height of up to 1.5 m (4 ft 11 in) and has grey, scaly to fibrous bark. Its leaves are egg-shaped with the narrower end towards the base, 8.0–11.5 mm (0.31–0.45 in) long and 2.2–3.8 mm (0.087–0.150 in) wide on a petiole about 1 mm (0.039 in) long. The flowers are up to 9 mm (0.35 in) in diameter and arranged in leaf axils, usually in groups of 7 on a peduncle 10.0–12.5 mm (0.39–0.49 in) long. Each flower is on a pedicel 2.0–3.5 mm (0.079–0.138 in) long with 2 bracts at the base, but that fall off as the flowers develop. The floral tube is broadly bell-shaped and 1.8–2.2 mm (0.071–0.087 in) long, the sepal lobes about 0.6 mm (0.024 in) long. The petals are white, 2.5–3.0 mm (0.098–0.118 in) long and wide and there are 11 to 14 stamens. Flowering have been observed in January, and the fruit is a hemispherical, capsule about 3 mm (0.12 in) in diameter.

== Taxonomy ==
This species was first formally described in 1999 by Anthony Bean who gave it the name Babingtonia papillosa in the journal Austrobaileya from specimens he collected near the headwaters of Cockatoo Creek in Mount Elliott National Park in 1997. In 2007, Peter Gordon Wilson transferred the species to the genus Sannantha as S. papillosa in Australian Systematic Botany. The specific epithet (papillosa) means "covered with short papilli", referring to the raised glands on the young branchlets.

== Distribution and habitat ==
Sannantha papillosa is only known from Frederick Peak and Bowling Green Bay National Park near Townsville, and in Homevale National Park near Mackay in north Queensland, where it grows in shrubland on granite outcrops.

== Conservation status ==
This species is listed as "vulnerable" under the Queensland Government Nature Conservation Act 1992.
