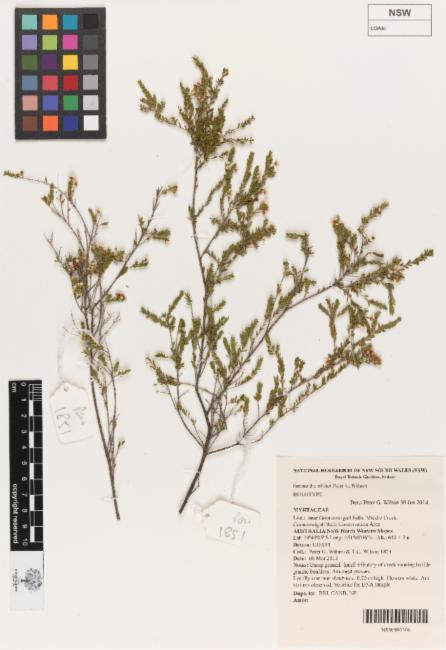

Scientific classification
- Kingdom: Plantae
- Clade: Tracheophytes
- Clade: Angiosperms
- Clade: Eudicots
- Clade: Rosids
- Order: Myrtales
- Family: Myrtaceae
- Genus: Sannantha
- Species: S. whitei

Binomial name
- Sannantha whitei Peter G.Wilson

Synonyms
- Sannantha sp. Goonoowigall Bushland Reserve (G.J.White NE 66952)

= Sannantha whitei =

Species of flowering plant

Sannantha whitei is a species of flowering plant in the myrtle family, Myrtaceae and is endemic to a small area in north-eastern New South Wales. It is a spreading shrub with narrowly elliptic to narrowly egg-shaped leaves, and white flowers arranged singly, in pairs or groups of three in leaf axils.

== Description ==
Sannantha whitei is a shrub that typically grows to a height of up to about 1 m (3 ft 3 in), its young stems more or less square in cross-section. Its leaves are narrowly elliptic to narrowly egg-shaped, the narrower end towards the base, 2.7–4 mm (0.11–0.16 in) long and 0.7–1.1 mm (0.028–0.043 in) wide on a petiole 0.5–0.6 mm (0.020–0.024 in) long. The flowers are up to 6–8 mm (0.24–0.31 in) in diameter and arranged singly, in pairs, or groups of three in leaf axils on a peduncle 1.0–3.5 mm (0.039–0.138 in) long. Each flower is on a pedicel 1.2–3.0 mm (0.047–0.118 in) long with bracteoles at the base, but that fall off as the flowers develop. The sepal have a thickened central rib, the petals are white, 2.2–3.0 mm (0.087–0.118 in) long and there are usually 6 to 8 stamens. Flowering occurs in summer and autumn and the fruit is a capsule 1.0–1.8 mm (0.039–0.071 in) in diameter.

== Taxonomy ==
Sannantha whitei was first formally described in 2007 by Peter Gordon Wilson in Australian Systematic Botany from specimens he collected in Goonoowigall State Conservation Reserve near Inverell in 2013. The specific epithet (whitei) honours Gordon J. White who discovered the species.

== Distribution and habitat ==
This species of sannantha grows in damp places in granitic soil in the Inverell district in north-eastern New South Wales.
