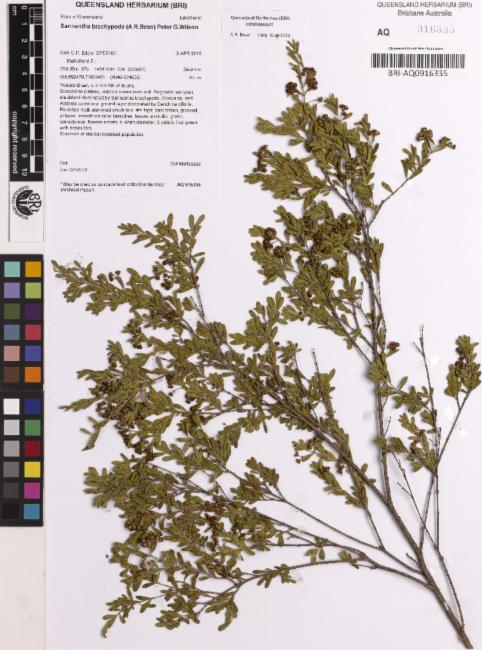

Conservation status
- Vulnerable (NCA)

Scientific classification
- Kingdom: Plantae
- Clade: Tracheophytes
- Clade: Angiosperms
- Clade: Eudicots
- Clade: Rosids
- Order: Myrtales
- Family: Myrtaceae
- Genus: Sannantha
- Species: S. brachypoda

Binomial name
- Sannantha brachypoda (A.R.Bean) Peter G.Wilson

Synonyms
- Babingtonia brachypoda A.R.Bean; Babingtonia sp. (Comet P.Rowland AQ634382)

= Sannantha brachypoda =

Species of flowering plant

Sannantha brachypoda is a species in the myrtle family, Myrtaceae and is endemic to central Queensland in Australia. It is a shrub with egg-shaped leaves, the narrower end towards the base, and groups of 3 white flowers arranged in leaf axils.

== Description ==
Sannantha brachypoda is a shrub that typically grows to a height of up to 4 m (13 ft) and has grey, scaly to fibrous bark. It leaves are egg-shaped with the narrower end towards the base, 5.5–9.0 mm (0.22–0.35 in) long and 1.8–2.8 mm (0.071–0.110 in) wide on a petiole 0.7–1.3 mm (0.028–0.051 in) long. The flowers are up to 8 mm (0.31 in) in diameter and arranged in leaf axils in groups of 3 on a peduncle 3–6 mm (0.12–0.24 in) long. Each flower is on a pedicel 1.2–2.5 mm (0.047–0.098 in) long with 2 bracts at the base, but that fall off as the flowers develop. The floral tube is 1.5–1.8 mm (0.059–0.071 in) long, the sepal lobes 0.7 mm (0.028 in) long. The petals are white, 2.2–2.5 mm (0.087–0.098 in) long and 1.8–2.5 mm (0.071–0.098 in) wide and there are usually 9 to 12 stamens. Flowering have been observed in January and March and the fruit is a hemispherical, capsule about 3.5 mm (0.14 in) in diameter.

== Taxonomy ==
This species was first formally described in 1999 by Anthony Bean who gave it the name Babingtonia brachypoda in the journal Austrobaileya from specimens he collected near Rolleston in 1996. In 2007, Peter Gordon Wilson changed the name to Sannantha brachypoda in Australian Systematic Botany. The specific epithet (brachypoda) means "short-footed", referring to the short pedicels of this species.

== Distribution and habitat ==
Sannantha brachypoda grows in sandy gullies or near sandstone ranges, near Rolleston, Woorabinda and Theodore in central Queensland.

== Conservation status ==
This species is listed as "vulnerable" under the Queensland Government Nature Conservation Act 1992.
