= Triplarina nowraensis =

Nowra myrtle heath

Conservation status
- Endangered (EPBC Act)

Scientific classification
- Kingdom: Plantae
- Clade: Tracheophytes
- Clade: Angiosperms
- Clade: Eudicots
- Clade: Rosids
- Order: Myrtales
- Family: Myrtaceae
- Genus: Triplarina
- Species: T. nowraensis

Binomial name
- Triplarina nowraensis A.R.Bean

Species of flowering plant

Triplarina nowraensis, commonly known as Nowra myrtle heath, is a species of flowering plant in the myrtle family, Myrtaceae and is endemic to a restricted area of New South Wales. It is a shrub with egg-shaped to lance-shaped leaves with the narrower end towards the base, flowers with five sepals, five cream-coloured to white petals and fifteen to seventeen stamens.

== Description ==
Triplarina nowraensis is a shrub that typically grows to a height of up to 3.5 m (11 ft) and has a grey, scaly bark on the branchlets. The leaves are egg-shaped to lance-shaped with the narrower end towards the base, 3.4–5.0 mm (0.13–0.20 in) long and 1.2–1.7 mm (0.047–0.067 in) wide on a petiole 0.4–0.6 mm (0.016–0.024 in) long. The flowers are arranged in leaf axils in pairs on a peduncle 1.2–3.5 mm (0.047–0.138 in) long. Each flower is about 4.5 mm (0.18 in) in diameter with leaf-like bracts about 0.9 mm (0.035 in) long. The sepal lobes are about 0.7 mm (0.028 in) long and 0.9–1.0 mm (0.035–0.039 in) wide and the petals are cream-coloured to white, 2.0–2.4 mm (0.079–0.094 in) long and wide. There are fifteen to seventeen stamens on filaments about 0.6 mm (0.024 in) long. Flowering has been recorded in November and December and the fruit is a hemispherical capsule 2.0–2.9 mm (0.079–0.114 in) long.

== Taxonomy and naming ==
Triplarina nowraensis was first formally described by Anthony Bean in 1995 and the description was published in the journal Austrobaileya from specimens collected near Flat Rock Dam, Nowra in 1994. The specific epithet (nowraensis) refers to the type location.

== Distribution and habitat ==
This triplarina grows in moist heath near streams or swampy slopes in the Nowra district.

== Conservation status ==
Triplarina nowraensis is classified as "endangered" under the Australian Government Environment Protection and Biodiversity Conservation Act 1999 and the New South Wales Government Biodiversity Conservation Act 2016, and a national recovery plan has been prepared.
