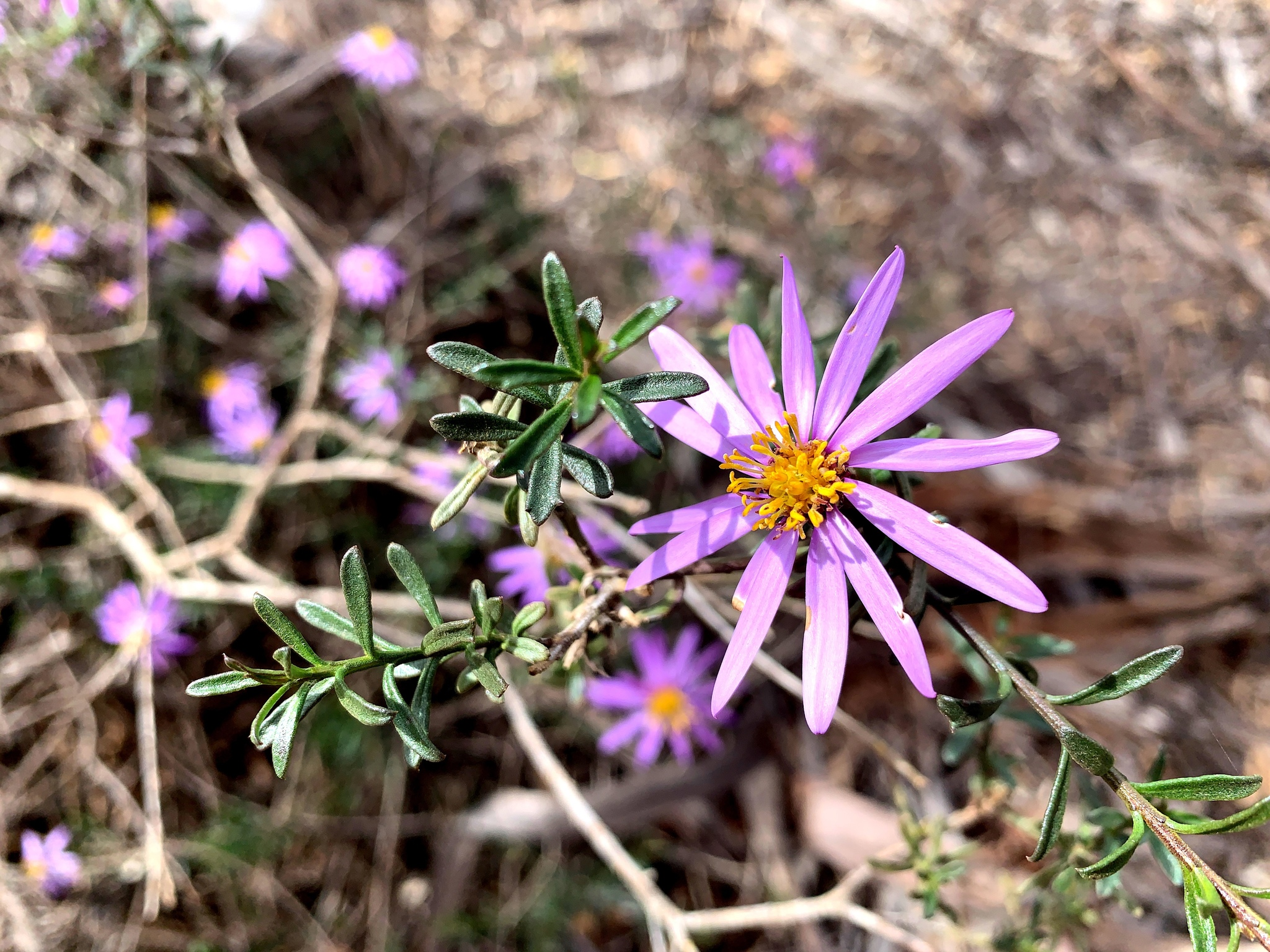
- Walsholaria magniflora

Scientific classification
- Kingdom: Plantae
- Clade: Embryophytes
- Clade: Tracheophytes
- Clade: Spermatophytes
- Clade: Angiosperms
- Clade: Eudicots
- Clade: Asterids
- Order: Asterales
- Family: Asteraceae
- Subfamily: Asteroideae
- Tribe: Astereae
- Subtribe: Brachyscominae
- Genus: Walsholaria; G.L.Nesom

= Walsholaria =

Genus of flowering plants

Walsholaria is a genus of flowering plants in the family Asteraceae. It includes four species of shrubs native to Australia.

The four species were previously placed in genus Olearia, which was found to be polyphyletic. In 2020 Guy L. Nesom described the genus Walsholaria, which he named for Australian botanist Neville G. Walsh. Walsholaria species are distinguished by their glabrous and resinous stems, leaves, and involucres; small, thickened, obovate or cuneate leaves with distally few-toothed margins; solitary terminal heads on short leafy branches; involucres with multiseriate, elliptic, and tightly appressed phyllaries; and oblong achenes with 4 to 6 ribs and apically acute pappus bristles.

== Species ==
Four species are accepted.

- Walsholaria calcarea (F.Muell. ex Benth.) G.L.Nesom
- Walsholaria cuneifolia (A.R.Bean & M.T.Mathieson) G.L.Nesom
- Walsholaria magniflora (F.Muell.) G.L.Nesom
- Walsholaria muelleri (Sond.) G.L.Nesom
