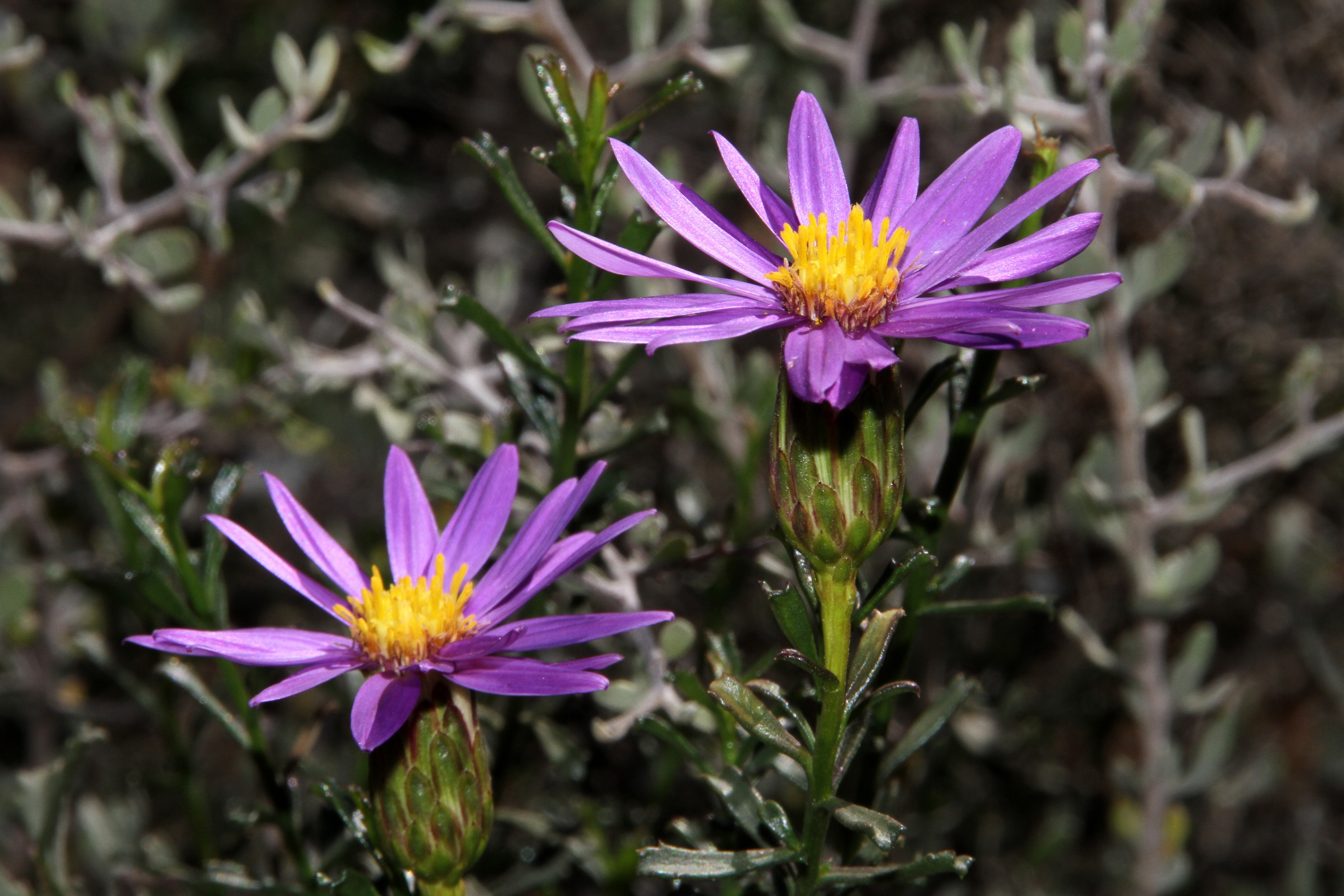
- Walsholaria magniflora growing near Mildura

Scientific classification
- Kingdom: Plantae
- Clade: Tracheophytes
- Clade: Angiosperms
- Clade: Eudicots
- Clade: Asterids
- Order: Asterales
- Family: Asteraceae
- Genus: Walsholaria
- Species: W. magniflora

Binomial name
- Walsholaria magniflora (F.Muell.) G.L.Nesom

Synonyms
- Aster magniflorus F.Muell.; Olearia magniflora (F.Muell.) F.Muell. ex Benth.

= Walsholaria magniflora =

Splendid daisy-bush

Species of shrub

Walsholaria magniflora, commonly known as splendid daisy-bush, is a small shrub with clusters of deep mauve to purple flowers.

== Description ==
Walsholaria magniflora is sprawling upright shrub to 1.5 m (4.9 ft) high with upright stems and an open habit. The branches are smooth and more or less woody. The sessile leaves are dark green above and paler underneath, smooth, slightly sticky and sparsely arranged alternately along the stem. The leaves vary from wedge-shaped or broader at the apex narrowing at the base, 8–18 mm (0.31–0.71 in) long and 2–5 mm (0.079–0.20 in) wide with a prominent mid-vein, usually 3-5 toothed edges at the apex and rolled margins. The single cluster of 14-20 flowers appear at the end of branches on a short stem less than 1 cm (0.39 in) long. The mauve to purple "petals" (strictly ligules of the ray florets) are linear and 18–24 mm (0.71–0.94 in) long. The flower centre is a yellow disk of 30-56 florets. The oval to linear overlapping bracts are arranged in rows of 4-5 and 15–20 mm (0.59–0.79 in) long, smooth and finely fringed. The dry fruit are one-seeded, smooth, compressed needle-shaped, 3–5 mm (0.12–0.20 in) long and with fine longitudinal lines. The seed is dispersed at maturity. Flowers from July to January.

== Taxonomy and naming ==
The splendid daisy-bush was first described in 1865 by Ferdinand von Mueller who called it Aster magniflora and published the description in Fragmenta phytographiae Australiae.The specific epithet (magniflora) means "large-flowered". In 1867 George Bentham changed the name to Olearia magniflora and published the change in Flora Australiensis. In 2020 Guy L. Nesom placed the species in the newly-described genus Walsholaria as W. magniflora after Olearia had been found to be polyphyletic.

== Distribution and habitat ==
The splendid daisy-bush grows in New South Wales, Victoria, Western Australia and South Australia. In New South Wales it is found mainly growing from Balranald and Wentworth areas and north to Wilcannia. It grows in heath, woodland and mallee in well-drained, sandy loam soils.
