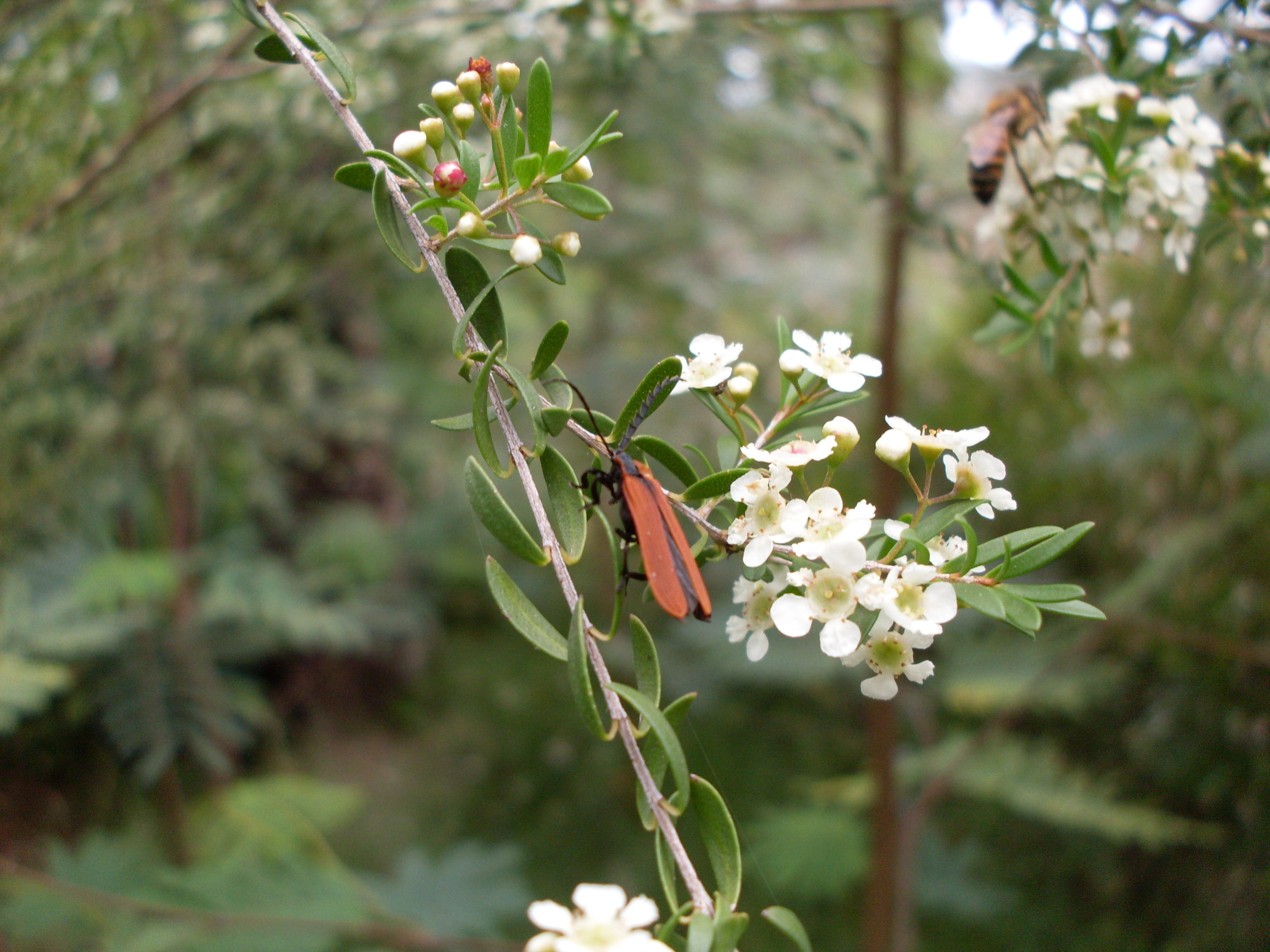

Conservation status
- Least Concern (IUCN 3.1)

Scientific classification
- Kingdom: Plantae
- Clade: Tracheophytes
- Clade: Angiosperms
- Clade: Eudicots
- Clade: Rosids
- Order: Myrtales
- Family: Myrtaceae
- Genus: Sannantha
- Species: S. pluriflora

Binomial name
- Sannantha pluriflora (F.Muell.) Peter G.Wilson

Synonyms
- Babingtonia pluriflora A.R.Bean nom. inval.; Camphoromyrtus pluriflora F.Muell.; Camphoromyrtus pluriflora F.Muell. isonym; Camphyromyrtus pluriflora F.Muell. orth. var.; Baeckea virgata auct. non (J.R.Forst. & G.Forst.) Andrews: Jeanes, J.A. in Walsh, N.G. & Entwisle, T.J. (ed.) (1996), Myrtaceae.

= Sannantha pluriflora =

Species of shrub

Sannantha pluriflora, commonly known as tall baeckea, is a species of flowering plant in the myrtle family, Myrtaceae, and is endemic to continental southeastern Australia. It is a shrub or small tree with lance-shaped to elliptic leaves, and groups of two to nine white flowers arranged in umbels in leaf axils.

== Description ==
Sannantha pluriflora is an erect shrub or small tree that typically grows to a height of 2–4 m (6 ft 7 in – 13 ft 1 in) and has branchlets that are more or less square in cross-section. The leaves are lance-shaped to elliptic, 7–30 mm (0.28–1.18 in) long and 1.0–6.5 mm (0.039–0.256 in) wide on a petiole 0.8–1.5 mm (0.031–0.059 in) long. The leaves have prominent oil glands, especially on the lower surface. The flowers are up to 10 mm (0.39 in) in diameter and arranged in umbels of two to nine in leaf axils on a peduncle 5–13 mm (0.20–0.51 in) long. Each flower is on a pedicel 3–7 mm (0.12–0.28 in) long with linear bracteoles up to 1.2 mm (0.047 in) long at the base. The floral tube is more or less smooth, the sepal lobes up to 0.6 mm (0.024 in) long. The petals are white and broadly egg-shaped to round, 2.5–3.7 mm (0.098–0.146 in) long and there are 8 to 15 stamens. Flowering mainly occurs from October to January and the fruit is a capsule 2.5–3.5 mm (0.098–0.138 in) in diameter.

== Taxonomy ==
This species was first formally described in 1855 by Victorian Government Botanist Ferdinand von Mueller who gave it the name Camphoromyrtus pluriflora in his Definitions of rare or hitherto undescribed Australian plants. In 2007, Peter Gordon Wilson placed it in the newly created genus Sannantha as S. pluriflora in Australian Systematic Botany.

In 1775, Johann and Georg Forster described Leptospermum virgatum in Characteres Generum Plantarum and in 1810, Henry Cranke Andrews transferred the species to Baeckea as B. virgata, a name that was previously misapplied to the present species. In 1999, Anthony Bean revised B. virgata in the journal Austrobaileya, and that name is no longer accepted by the Australian Plant Census.

== Distribution ==
Sannantha pluriflora mostly grows in forest near streams and is widespread on the coast and nearby tablelands of New South Wales south from Port Stephens to Gippsland in eastern Victoria.
