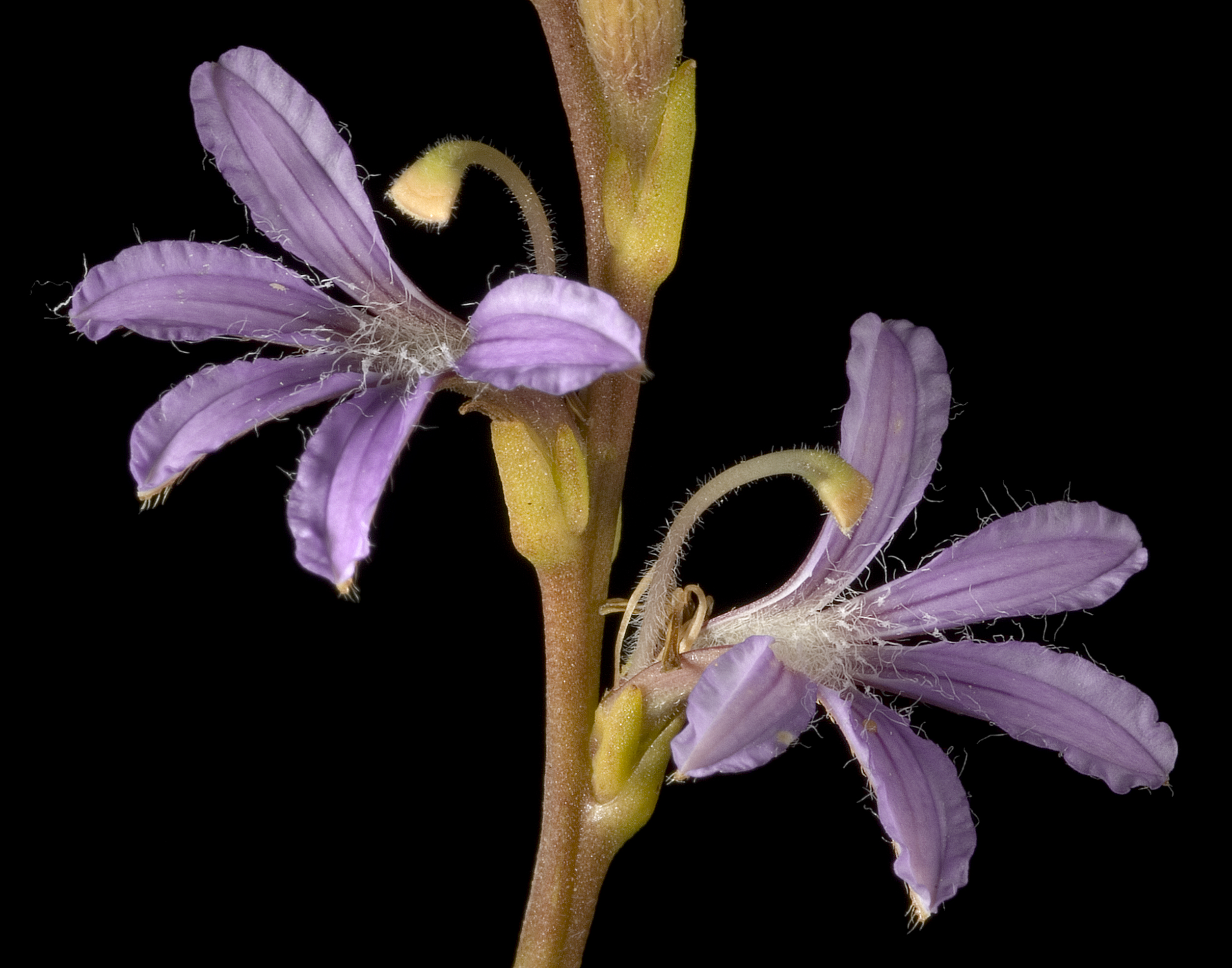

Scientific classification
- Kingdom: Plantae
- Clade: Embryophytes
- Clade: Tracheophytes
- Clade: Spermatophytes
- Clade: Angiosperms
- Clade: Eudicots
- Clade: Asterids
- Order: Asterales
- Family: Goodeniaceae
- Genus: Scaevola
- Species: S. cunninghamii

Binomial name
- Scaevola cunninghamii DC.
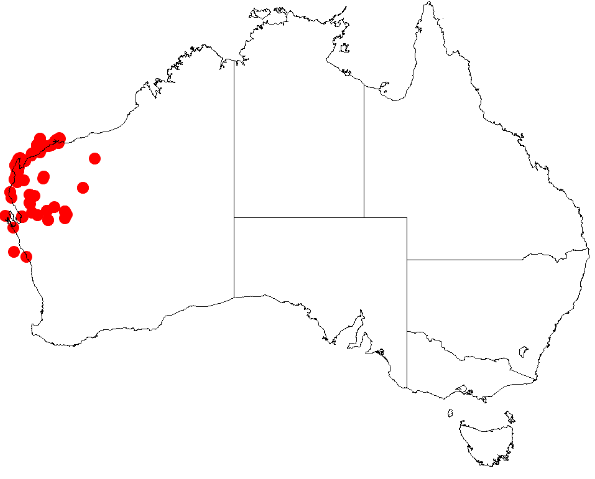
- Occurrence data from AVH

Synonyms
- Lobelia cunninghamii (DC.) Kuntze; Scaevola cunninghami DC. orth. var.; Scaevola cunninghamii DC. var. cunninghamii; Scaevola cunninghamii var. hispida Benth.; Scaevola maitlandi F.Muell. orth. var.; Scaevola maitlandii F.Muell.; Scaevola maitlandii F.Muell. isonym

= Scaevola cunninghamii =

Species of flowering plant

Scaevola cunninghamii is a species of flowering plant in the family Goodeniaceae, and is native to the north-west of Western Australia. It is spreading perennial herb, shrub or subshrub with sessile, linear to lance-shaped leaves, with the narrower end towards the base, and sometimes toothed, loose spikes, thyrses or cymes of blue or white flowers and spherical and grooved fruit.

== Description ==
Scaevola cunninghamii is a spreading perennial herb, shrub or subshrub that typically grows to a height of up to 8 cm (3.1 in) and is sometimes sticky when young. Its leaves are sessile, linear to narrowly lance-shaped with the narrower end towards the base and sometimes toothed, 35–90 mm (1.4–3.5 in) long and 1–6 mm (0.039–0.236 in) wide. The flowers are arranged in spikes on the ends of branches, sometimes in thyrses or cymes on the end of axillary peduncles up to 100 mm (3.9 in) long with linear bracts 5–15 mm (0.20–0.59 in) long, and lance-shaped bracteoles 2.5–4 mm (0.098–0.157 in) long and more or less equalling the sepals. The sepals are blue or white, wavy, united in a tube about 1 mm (0.039 in) long. The petals are about 12 mm (0.47 in) long, sticky or hairy outside and bearded inside. The wings are about 1 mm (0.039 in) long and the ovary has two locules. Flowering occurs from May to September, and the fruit is spherical, grooved, up to 4 mm (0.16 in) wide.

== Taxonomy ==
Scaevola cunninghamii was first formally described in 1839 by Augustin Pyramus de Candolle in his Prodromus Systematis Naturalis Regni Vegetabilis from specimens collected by Allan Cunningham on the Dampier Archipelago. The specific epithet (cunninghamii) honours the collector of the type specimens.

== Distribution and habitat ==
This species of scaevola occurs in the Pilbara region of north-western Western Australia where it usually grows near the coast on sand, in sandhills and limestone rises, in the Carnarvon, Gascoyne, Murchison, Pilbara, and Yalgoo biogeographic regions.
