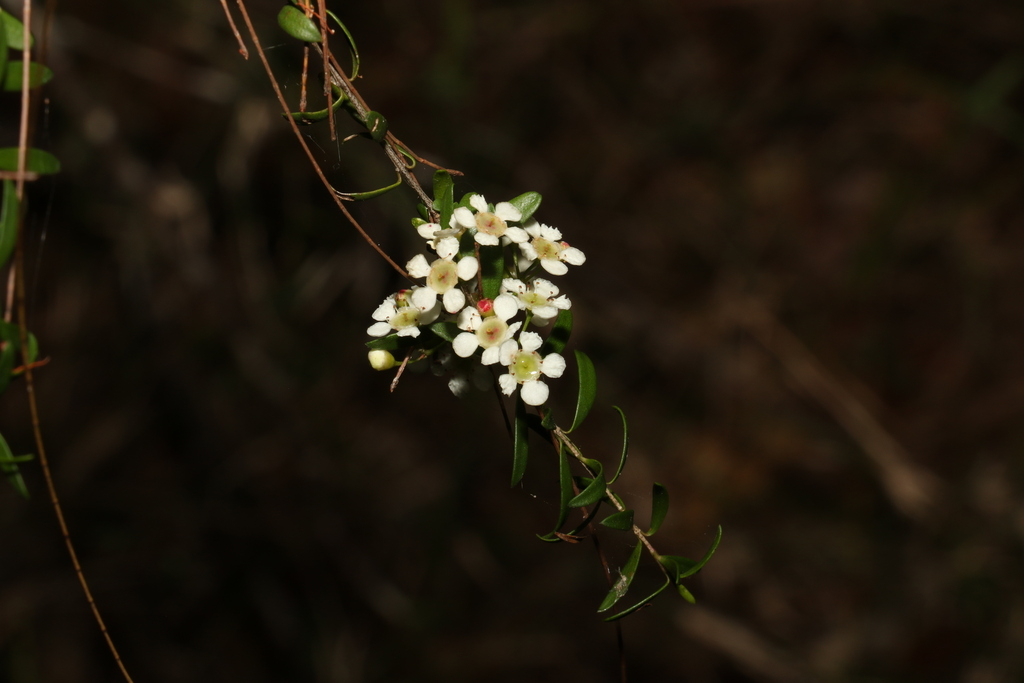

Scientific classification
- Kingdom: Plantae
- Clade: Tracheophytes
- Clade: Angiosperms
- Clade: Eudicots
- Clade: Rosids
- Order: Myrtales
- Family: Myrtaceae
- Genus: Sannantha
- Species: S. collina

Binomial name
- Sannantha collina (A.R.Bean) Peter G.Wilson

Synonyms
- Babingtonia collina A.R.Bean; Babingtonia sp. (Mt Crosby L.H.Bird+ AQ635744)

= Sannantha collina =

Species of flowering plant

Sannantha collina is a species in the myrtle family, Myrtaceae and is endemic to eastern Australia. It is a shrub with lance-shaped leaves and groups of 3 to 7 white flowers arranged in leaf axils.

== Description ==
Sannantha collina is a shrub that typically grows to a height of up to 3 m (9.8 ft) and has grey, scaly to fibrous bark. Its leaves are lance-shaped, 6.5–12.5 mm (0.26–0.49 in) long and 1.7–2.5 mm (0.067–0.098 in) wide on a petiole 0.6–1.3 mm (0.024–0.051 in) long. The flowers are up to 8 mm (0.31 in) in diameter and arranged in leaf axils in groups of 3 to 7 on a peduncle 5.0–9.5 mm (0.20–0.37 in) long. Each flower is on a pedicel 2.5–4.0 mm (0.098–0.157 in) long with 2 bracts at the base, but that fall off as the flowers develop. The floral tube is 1.5–2.0 mm (0.059–0.079 in) long, the sepal lobes 0.6 mm (0.024 in) long. The petals are white, 2.2–2.8 mm (0.087–0.110 in) long and wide and there are usually 8 to 11 stamens. Flowering mainly occurs between November and March and the fruit is a hemispherical capsule about 3 mm (0.12 in) in diameter.

== Taxonomy ==
This species was first formally described in 1999 by Anthony Bean who gave it the name Babingtonia collina in the journal Austrobaileya from specimens collected on Karana Downs in 1995. In 2007, Peter Gordon Wilson changed the name to Sannantha collina in Australian Systematic Botany. The specific epithet (collina) means "relating to hills", referring to the usual habitat of this species.

== Distribution and habitat ==
Sannantha collina grows in shrubland and forest in isolated populations mainly between Yandina in north-eastern Queensland and Dorrigo in north-eastern New South Wales.
