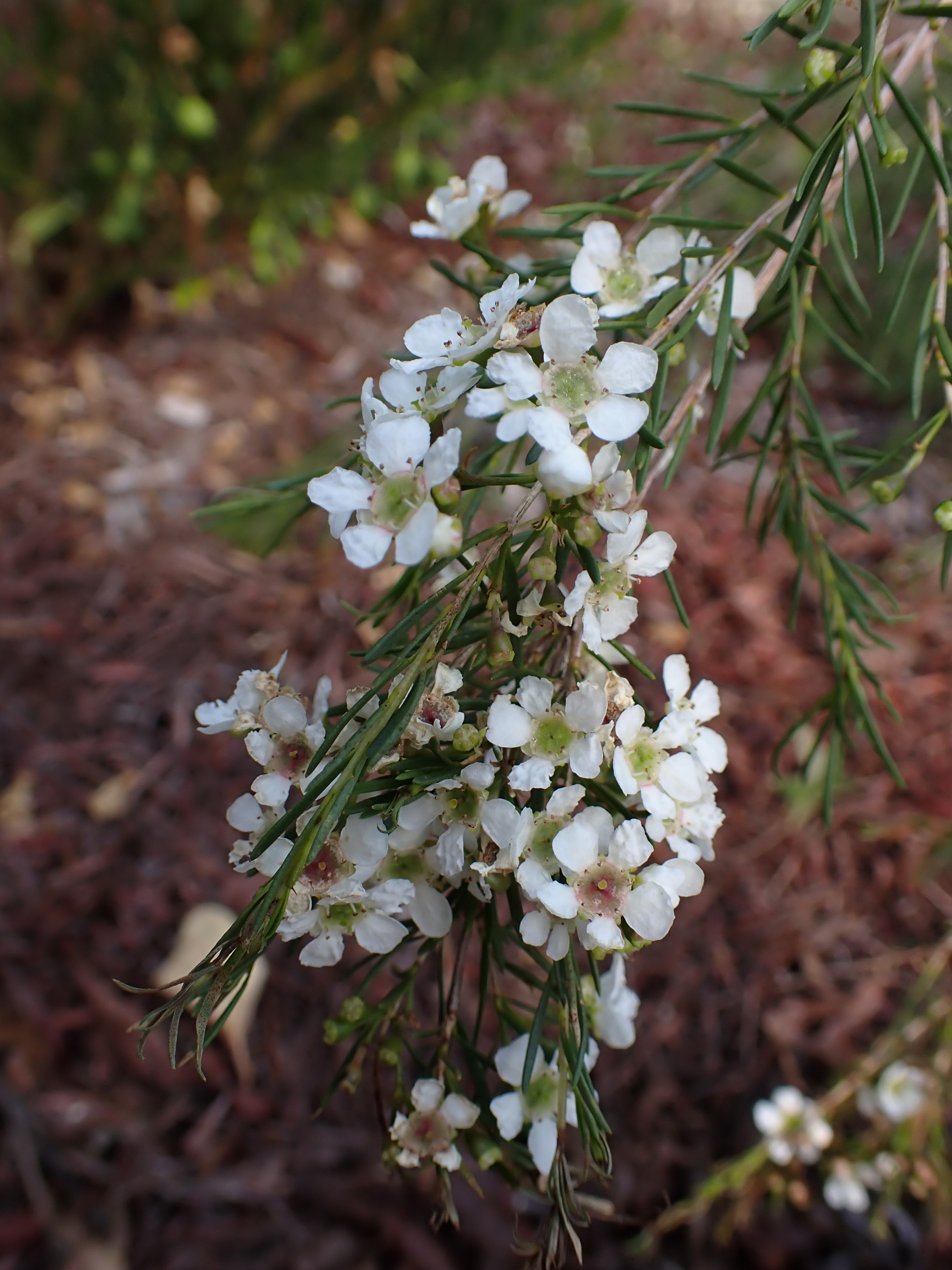

Scientific classification
- Kingdom: Plantae
- Clade: Tracheophytes
- Clade: Angiosperms
- Clade: Eudicots
- Clade: Rosids
- Order: Myrtales
- Family: Myrtaceae
- Genus: Sannantha
- Species: S. angusta

Binomial name
- Sannantha angusta (A.R.Bean) Peter G.Wilson

Synonyms
- Babingtonia angusta A.R.Bean; Babingtonia sp. (Atherton A.R.Bean 5707); Baeckea sp. 'Clarence River'

= Sannantha angusta =

Australian species of plant

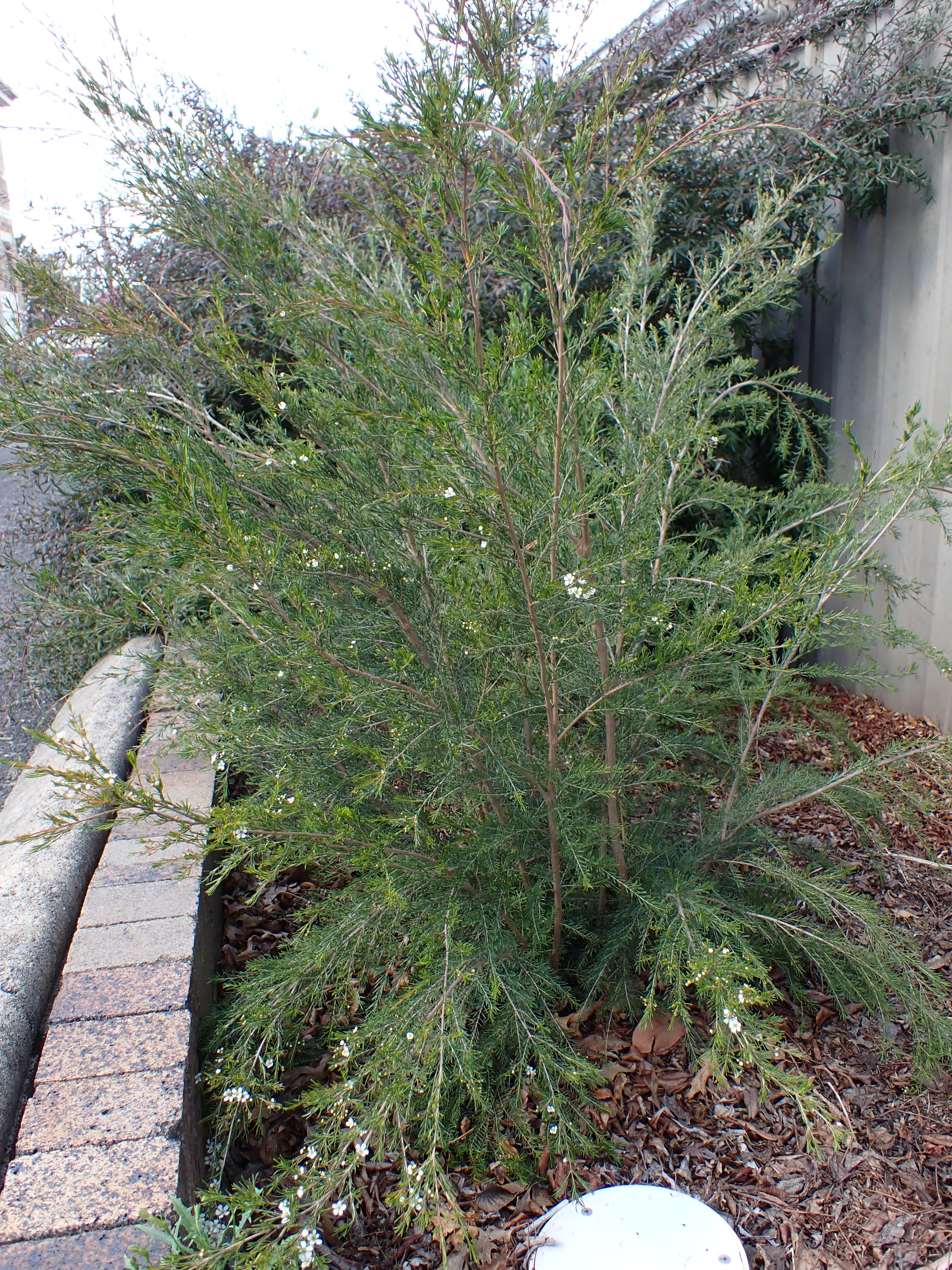
Habit (cultivated specimen)

Sannantha angusta is a species of flowering plant in the family Myrtaceae, and is endemic to eastern Australia. It has scaly to fibrous bark, narrowly lance-shaped to linear leaves and white flowers, and usually grows in forest on rocky hillsides. It was previously known as Babingtonia angusta, and has been cultivated as Baeckea sp. 'Clarence River'.

== Description ==
Sannantha angusta is a shrub that typically grows to a height of up to 2.5 m (8 ft 2 in) and has scaly grey to fibrous bark. Its young stems are square in cross-section. The leaves are narrowly lance-shaped with the narrower end towards the base or linear, 5.5–10 mm (0.22–0.39 in) long and 0.5–1 mm (0.020–0.039 in) wide on a petiole 0.6–1.2 mm (0.024–0.047 in) long. The flowers are borne singly or in groups of up to three in leaf axils on a peduncle 2.5–7.5 mm (0.098–0.295 in) long, each flower on a pedicel 1–3 mm (0.039–0.118 in) long. The floral cup is smooth, 1.5–2.0 mm (0.059–0.079 in) long. The sepals are broadly triangular with compound lobes, the inner lobes up to 7 mm (0.28 in) long and the outer lobes shorter. The flowers are up to 8 mm (0.31 in) in diameter, the petals 2.0–2.8 mm (0.079–0.110 in) long and white and there are 8 to 13 stamens. Flowering occurs from November to March and the fruit is a woody capsule 3.0–3.5 mm (0.12–0.14 in) in diameter.

== Taxonomy and naming ==
This species was first formally described in 1999 by Anthony Bean who gave it the name Babingtonia angusta in the journal Austrobaileya from specimens he collected near Coutts Crossing in 1995. In 2007, Peter Gordon Wilson changed the name to Sannantha angusta in Australian Systematic Botany. It had previously been known as Baeckea sp. 'Clarence River', and was available under this name in the horticultural trade. The specific epithet (angusta) means "narrow", referring to the leaves of this species.

== Distribution and habitat ==
Sannantha angusta grows in forest on rocky hillsides at altitudes between 200 and 1,500 m (660 and 4,920 ft) and is found between Atherton and Townsville in North Queensland, in south-eastern Queensland, and as far south as the Kempsey district in New South Wales.
