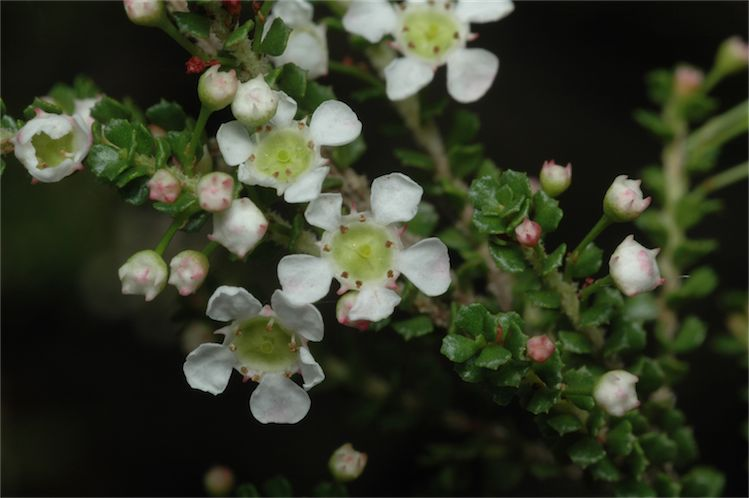
- In the Australian National Botanic Gardens

Scientific classification
- Kingdom: Plantae
- Clade: Tracheophytes
- Clade: Angiosperms
- Clade: Eudicots
- Clade: Rosids
- Order: Myrtales
- Family: Myrtaceae
- Genus: Sannantha
- Species: S. cunninghamii

Binomial name
- Sannantha cunninghamii (Schauer) Peter G.Wilson

Synonyms
- Babingtonia cunninghamii (Schauer) A.R.Bean; Baeckea cunninghamii (Schauer) Benth.; Baeckea microphylla Schauer nom. inval., pro syn.; Harmogia cunninghami Schauer orth. var.; Harmogia cunninghamii Schauer nom. inval., nom. nud.; Harmogia cunninghamii Schauer

= Sannantha cunninghamii =

Species of flowering plant

Sannantha cunninghamii is a species of flowering plant in the myrtle family, Myrtaceae and is endemic to eastern New South Wales. It is a shrub with round to broadly elliptic leaves with irregular edges, and white flowers arranged singly, in pairs or groups of three in leaf axils.

== Description ==
Sannantha cunninghamii is a shrub that typically grows to a height of up to 1.5 m (4 ft 11 in), its young stems grey or reddish. Its leaves are round to broadly elliptic, 1.2–2.4 mm (0.047–0.094 in) long and 1.0–2.5 mm (0.039–0.098 in) wide on a petiole 0.4–0.7 mm (0.016–0.028 in) long. The edges of the leaves are irregularly toothed or lobed. The flowers are up to 6–7 mm (0.24–0.28 in) in diameter and arranged singly, in pairs, or groups of three in leaf axils on a peduncle 1.0–3.8 mm (0.039–0.150 in) long. Each flower is on a pedicel 2.5–3.8 mm (0.098–0.150 in) long with 2 to 4 bracteoles at the base, but that fall off as the flowers develop. The floral tube is 1.2–1.5 mm (0.047–0.059 in) long, the sepal lobes 0.8–1.1 mm (0.031–0.043 in) long and thin. The petals are white, 1.6–2.5 mm (0.063–0.098 in) long and there are 6 to 9 stamens. Flowering occurs from September to December and the fruit is a hemispherical capsule 2.1–2.5 mm (0.083–0.098 in) in diameter.

== Taxonomy ==
This species was first formally described in 1843 by Johannes Schauer who gave it the name Harmogia cunninghamii in Walpers' book Repertorium Botanices Systematicae. In 2007, Peter Gordon Wilson transferred the species to Sannantha as S. cunninghamii in Australian Systematic Botany.

== Distribution and habitat ==
This species of sannantha grows in forest and shrubby woodland between the Pilliga Scrub the Hunter Valley and the Cowra district in eastern inland New South Wales.
