= Anthony Bean =

Australian botanist

- Born: 19 December 1957
- Occupation: Botanical collector; scientific collector
- Academic career
- Institutions: Queensland Herbarium; Brisbane Botanic Gardens, Mount Coot-tha; CSIRO
- Author abbrev. (botany): A.R.Bean

Anthony Russell Bean (born 1957) is an Australian botanist who works at the Queensland Herbarium and Brisbane Botanic Gardens, Mount Coot-tha. Since 1982, he has led the Eucalyptus Study Group of the Society for Growing Australian Plants. The standard author abbreviation A.R.Bean is used to indicate this person as the author when citing a botanical name.

== Career ==
From at least 1989, he was working at CSIRO, Division of Plant Industry, in Nambour, Queensland, and much of that work was on Eucalypts.

In later years he has contributed to the history of Australian botany, with work on Ludwig Leichhardt, Frederick Kenny, and Cyril Tenison White,

== Names published ==
IPNI lists 343 names published by Bean. Examples are:

- Alphitonia pomaderroides (Fenzl) A.R.Bean.
- Eucalyptus exilipes M.I.H. Brooker & A.R. Bean
