= Loekoeslaszloa =

Scientific classification
- Kingdom: Fungi
- Division: Ascomycota
- Class: Lecanoromycetes
- Order: Teloschistales
- Family: Teloschistaceae
- Genus: Loekoeslaszloa; S.Y.Kondr., Kärnefelt, Elix, A.Thell & Hur (2019)

Species
- L. geumohdoensis L. huriana L. reducta

Genus of lichen-forming fungi

Loekoeslaszloa is a genus of lichen-forming fungi in the family Teloschistaceae. It comprises three species of crustose lichens found in East Asia, particularly South Korea and Japan, growing on both rock and tree bark. Species typically form greyish crusts with brownish to orange fruiting bodies. The genus was erected in 2019 to accommodate a small East Asian lineage that earlier authors had placed in other teloschistacean genera.

== Taxonomy ==
Loekoeslaszloa was proposed as a new genus in 2019 based on a study that compared DNA sequence data from three standard genetic markers (nrITS, nrLSU and mtSSU) with microscopic and other morphological features. The type species is Loekoeslaszloa geumohdoensis. The generic name honours the Hungarian lichenologist László Sándor Lőkös, recognising his contributions to the understanding of East Asian lichens.

In DNA-based evolutionary analyses, Loekoeslaszloa consistently groups with the related genera Yoshimuria and Ikaeria within a single branch (a clade) that corresponds to the subfamily Ikaerioideae (called "Ikaerioideae ad int." in the 2019 paper), placed between the subfamilies Brownlielloideae and Caloplacoideae. The type species had previously been placed in Mikhtomia based on an nrITS-only phylogeny, but additional markers and more specimens supported recognition of a distinct Loekoeslaszloa lineage within that Ikaerioideae clade.

When the genus was introduced, only two species were reported—L. geumohdoensis and L. huriana—both from South Korea, and the authors noted that an additional, undescribed Japanese species was under study. A third species, Loekoeslaszloa reducta, was described in 2022 from Okinawa (Japan).

A later taxonomic treatment proposed a broader concept of the genus: Kondratyuk and co-authors suggested that the genus Oceanoplaca should be synonymised with Loekoeslaszloa, and they listed transfers of multiple Oceanoplaca species into Loekoeslaszloa (e.g. O. caesioisidiata, O. caesiosorediata, O. catillarioides, O. chemoisidiosa, O. isidiosa and O. sideritoides). However, this proposed synonymy has not been adopted by the main fungal nomenclatural repositories: as of January 2026, Index Fungorum, Fungal Names, and MycoBank still list Oceanoplaca as a distinct genus rather than treating it under Loekoeslaszloa.

== Description ==
Species of Loekoeslaszloa are crustose lichens (forming a thin crust tightly attached to the substrate). The thallus (lichen body) is typically grey to dark brownish grey, and a blackish hypothallus (a darker marginal zone) may be present.

When sexual fruiting bodies are present, the apothecia usually have a rim derived from the thallus (lecanorine to zeorine) but can sometimes look as if the rim is only from the apothecium itself (biatorine); the central disc is dull brown to dull brownish orange or dull yellow-orange, and may develop darker patches with age. The margins are often paler than the disc, and the outer (thalline) rim can be dull greenish yellow to greyish yellow and may appear crenulate (scalloped). In cross-section, the proper exciple (the apothecium's own outer wall, not the thallus-derived rim) has been described as either scleroplectenchymatous (densely interwoven, thick-walled hyphae) or as textura intricata (a looser tangle of hyphae), and the tips of the paraphyses are only slightly swollen. The asci are 8-spored, and the authors noted that orange pigment can develop in the ascus contents. Mature bipolar ascospores were reported as rare, with the ascospore septum of medium width.

Asexual reproductive structures (conidiomata) may appear as blackish spots on the thallus and produce narrowly bacilliform (rod-shaped) conidia. At least some species produce soralia (powdery patches releasing soredia for vegetative propagation), and the genus includes both sorediate, often sterile material and fertile material with apothecia.

Spot-test chemistry reported for the genus varies between species: in L. huriana, parts of the apothecium/exciple showed a K+ (purple) reaction, while in L. reducta the epihymenium and uppermost true exciple were reported as K+ bluish to bluish purple, sometimes darkening.

== Habitat and distribution ==
Loekoeslaszloa is currently known from East Asia. The two species reported at the time of the genus description (L. geumohdoensis and L. huriana) were known from South Korea, and the authors also flagged an additional, unnamed Japanese taxon as being under study. The third described species, L. reducta, is so far known from several localities in Okinawa (Japan).

The genus occupies a range of substrates and settings, including both rock and bark. In South Korea, L. huriana was collected on siliceous rock (including mountain sites and coastal rock), and was reported as occurring often in shaded conditions. By contrast, specimens records for L. geumohdoensis include collections on bark (e.g. on Robinia pseudoacacia) on Ulleungdo Island. In Okinawa, L. reducta grows on bark of Allocasuarina verticillata and has repeatedly been collected alongside species of Buellia.

== Species ==
- Loekoeslaszloa geumohdoensis (S.Y.Kondr., D.Liu & Hur) S.Y.Kondr., Yoshik.Yamam. & Hur (2019)
- Loekoeslaszloa huriana S.Y.Kondr. (2019)
- Loekoeslaszloa reducta S.Y.Kondr., Kusui, K.Hara & Yoshik.Yamam. (2022)
