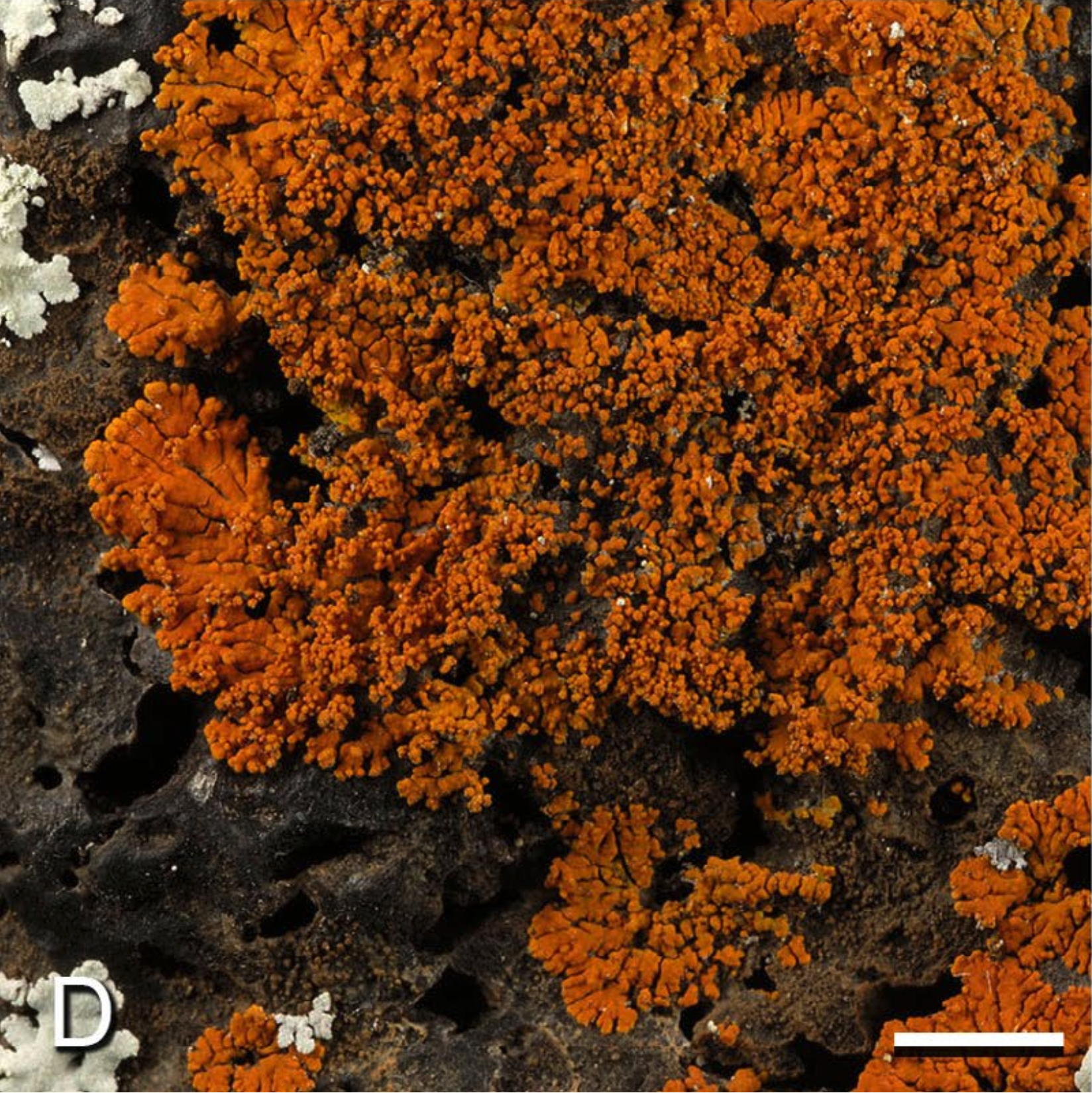
- Oceanoplaca isidiosa; scale bar: 2 mm

Scientific classification
- Kingdom: Fungi
- Division: Ascomycota
- Class: Lecanoromycetes
- Order: Teloschistales
- Family: Teloschistaceae
- Genus: Oceanoplaca; Arup, Søchting & Bungartz (2020)

Type species
- Oceanoplaca isidiosa (Vain.) Bungartz, Søchting & Arup (2020)

Species
- O. caesioisidiata O. caesiosorediata O. catillarioides O. chemoisidiosa O. isidiosa O. sideritoides

= Oceanoplaca =

Genus of lichen-forming fungi

Oceanoplaca is a fungal genus in the family Teloschistaceae. It comprises six species of crustose lichens that grow primarily on rocks in coastal and arid environments, particularly in the Galápagos Islands, Cape Verde, and parts of Central and North America. The genus was established in 2020 based on molecular and morphological studies, with some species producing the rare pigment isidiosin while others lack it. Many species reproduce asexually through small, breakaway outgrowths (isidia) rather than forming the more typical disk-shaped fruiting bodies.

== Taxonomy ==
Oceanoplaca was established in 2020 by Ulf Arup, Ulrik Søchting, and Frank Bungartz during a molecular and morphological revision of Teloschistaceae from the Galápagos Islands. The type species is Oceanoplaca isidiosa. In phylogenetic analyses, Oceanoplaca forms a distinct lineage within the subfamily Caloplacoideae and is recovered as a close relative (sister group) of the genus Phaeoplaca, (now Obscuroplaca).

The generic name combines "-placa" (a nod to the broad traditional genus Caloplaca, where several species were previously placed) with "oceano-", referring to the frequent association of the known species with coastal environments. The genus includes species with different chemistry: some produce the rare anthraquinone pigment isidiosin (for example, O. isidiosa and O. chemoisidiosa), while others lack it (for example O. sideritoides).

Sergey Kondratyuk and colleagues (2022) argued that Oceanoplaca does not warrant recognition as a separate genus and should be treated as a synonym of Loekoeslaszloa, based on their multi-locus phylogenetic analyses. They accordingly proposed transferring species previously placed in Oceanoplaca into Loekoeslaszloa (including L. isidiosa, L. chemoisidiosa, and L. sideritoides). However, this proposed synonymy has not been adopted by the main fungal nomenclatural repositories: as of January 2026, both Index Fungorum and MycoBank still list Oceanoplaca as a distinct genus rather than treating it under Loekoeslaszloa.

== Description ==
Species of Oceanoplaca are crustose lichens, forming a thin to thick crust (the thallus) closely attached to the substrate. The thallus can range from a granular, broken-up crust to more continuous patches with small, scale-like units, and in some species it develops a more rosette-like form with radiating marginal lobes (placodioid growth). Many species reproduce asexually with isidia—tiny outgrowths that break off and help the lichen spread.

When present, the sexual fruiting bodies are disk-shaped apothecia. Depending on the species, apothecia may have different kinds of margins (often described in lichenology as lecanorine, biatorine, or zeorine). Microscopically, the asci are club-shaped and typically contain eight spores. The ascospores are polarilocular (two-celled with a conspicuous, thickened septum), a common spore type in Teloschistaceae.

Chemically, Oceanoplaca species may contain anthraquinone pigments in the thallus and/or apothecia; in some species the uncommon anthraquinone isidiosin occurs in the apothecia and may also occur in the thallus. Differences in pigment chemistry help separate otherwise similar-looking species within the genus.

== Habitat and distribution ==
Oceanoplaca species grow mainly on rock (saxicolous), but some can also occur on bark (corticolous). As currently understood, the genus has been recorded from Central America (including material from Panama used in molecular analyses), the Galápagos Islands, the Cape Verde Islands, and the Sonoran Desert region of North America.

In the Galápagos, collections show that Oceanoplaca commonly occurs in arid to seasonally dry settings, especially from the coastal zone through the dry zone and into the lower transition zone. Species may occupy fully exposed rock faces subject to wind and rain, but some are also found in partially shaded or sheltered microsites. For example, O. chemoisidiosa is currently known only from dry-zone rocks on Santa Cruz, San Cristóbal, and Pinzón, while O. sideritoides (including both isidiate and non-isidiate forms) is known only from the Galápagos and has been collected from the coast through the dry zone into the lower transition zone. The type species O. isidiosa was originally described from Brazil and is common on Galápagos rocks, especially near shorelines and other exposed sites.

== Species ==
The following species have been placed in Oceanoplaca in the 2020 revision (and associated new combinations):

- Oceanoplaca caesioisidiata (Arup & van den Boom) Arup (2020) — Cape Verde Islands
- Oceanoplaca caesiosorediata (Arup & van den Boom) Arup (2020) — Cape Verde Islands
- Oceanoplaca catillarioides (Arup & van den Boom) Arup (2020) — Cape Verde Islands
- Oceanoplaca chemoisidiosa Søchting & Bungartz (2020) — Galápagos Islands
- Oceanoplaca isidiosa (Vain.) Bungartz, Søchting & Arup (2020) — type species; Brazil; Galápagos Islands
- Oceanoplaca sideritoides Søchting & Bungartz (2020) — Galápagos Islands
