= Calytrix plumulosa =

Conservation status
- Priority Three — Poorly Known Taxa (DEC)

Scientific classification
- Kingdom: Plantae
- Clade: Tracheophytes
- Clade: Angiosperms
- Clade: Eudicots
- Clade: Rosids
- Order: Myrtales
- Family: Myrtaceae
- Genus: Calytrix
- Species: C. plumulosa

Binomial name
- Calytrix plumulosa (F.Muell.) B.D.Jacks.

Synonyms
- Calycothrix plumulosa F.Muell.; Calythrix plumulosa B.D.Jacks. orth. var.

Species of flowering plant

Calytrix plumulosa is a species of flowering plant in the myrtle family Myrtaceae and is endemic to the south-west of Western Australia. It is a shrub with linear leaves and rose-coloured to violet and yellow flowers with about 35 to 75 yellow stamens in three rows.

== Description ==
Calytrix plumulosa is a shrub that typically grows to a height of 15–40 cm (5.9–15.7 in). Its leaves are linear to egg-shaped with the narrower end towards the base, 3–11 mm (0.12–0.43 in) long and 0.4–1 mm (0.016–0.039 in) wide on a petiole 0.25–1.0 mm (0.0098–0.0394 in) long. There are stipules up to 0.2 mm (0.0079 in) long at the base of the petiole. The flowers are borne on a funnel-shaped peduncle 5.5–8.0 mm (0.22–0.31 in) long with lance-shaped lobes 3–6 mm (0.12–0.24 in) long. The floral tube is 6–8 mm (0.24–0.31 in) long and has 10 ribs. The sepals are fused at the base, with broadly egg-shaped to round lobes 1.5 mm (0.059 in) long and 1.5–2 mm (0.059–0.079 in) wide. The petals are rose-coloured to violet with a yellow base, lance-shaped to elliptic, 7.5–10 mm (0.30–0.39 in) long and 3–5 mm (0.12–0.20 in) wide, and there are about 35 to 75 yellow stamens in three rows, and that turn ochreous as they age. Flowering occurs in October and November.

== Taxonomy ==
This species was first formally described in 1876 by Ferdinand von Mueller who gave it the name Calycothrix plumulosa in his Fragmenta Phytographiae Australiae from specimens collected near Mount Churchman by Jess Young. In 1893, Benjamin Daydon Jackson transferred the species to Calytrix as C. plumulosa in the Index Kewensis. The specific epithet (plumulosa) means 'covered with small feathers'.

== Distribution and habitat ==
Calytrix plumulosa occurs between the Bunjil district and the Bencubbin district in the Avon Wheatbelt and Coolgardie bioregions of south-west Western Australia, where it grows in scrubby heath on yellow sand.

== Conservation status ==
Calytrix plumulosa is listed as "Priority Three" by the Government of Western Australia Department of Biodiversity, Conservation and Attractions, meaning that it is poorly known and known from only a few locations but is not under imminent threat.
