= Calytrix pulchella =

Conservation status
- Priority Three — Poorly Known Taxa (DEC)

Scientific classification
- Kingdom: Plantae
- Clade: Tracheophytes
- Clade: Angiosperms
- Clade: Eudicots
- Clade: Rosids
- Order: Myrtales
- Family: Myrtaceae
- Genus: Calytrix
- Species: C. pulchella

Binomial name
- Calytrix pulchella (Turcz.) B.D.Jacks.

Species of flowering plant

Calytrix pulchella is a species of flowering plant in the myrtle family Myrtaceae and is endemic to the south-west of Western Australia. It is a glabrous shrub with widely spaced, linear to narrowly elliptic leaves and purple flowers, with about 40 to 50 stamens in several rows.

== Description ==
Calytrix pulchella is a glabrous shrub that typically grows to a height of up to 60 cm (24 in). Its leaves are usually closely spaced, linear to very narrowly elliptic, 3–20 mm (0.12–0.79 in) long and 0.6–1 mm (0.024–0.039 in) wide on a petiole 0.5–1.5 mm (0.020–0.059 in) long with stipules up to 0.4 mm (0.016 in) long at the base. The flowers are borne on a narrowly funnel-shaped peduncle 7–10 mm (0.28–0.39 in) long with elliptic to egg-shaped lobes 4–7 mm (0.16–0.28 in) long. The floral tube is 7–12 mm (0.28–0.47 in) long and more or less spindle-shaped with ten ribs. The sepals are round to egg-shaped, 1.5–2.0 mm (0.059–0.079 in) long and 1.3–2.0 mm (0.051–0.079 in) wide with an awn up to 10 mm (0.39 in) long. The petals are pink to deep pink with a yellow base, lance-shaped to elliptic, 6.0–10 mm (0.24–0.39 in) long and 2.8–4.0 mm (0.11–0.16 in) wide, and there are about 25 to 40 stamens in several rows. Flowering occurs from August to November.

== Taxonomy ==
This species was first formally described in 1852 by Nikolai Turczaninow wo gave it the name Calycothrix pulchella in the Bulletin de la Classe Physico-Mathématique de l'Académie Impériale des Sciences de Saint-Pétersbourg, from specimens collected by James Drummond. In 1893, Benjamin Daydon Jackson transferred the species to Calytrix as C. pulchella in Index Kewensis. The specific epithet (pulchella) means 'beautiful and small'.

== Distribution and habitat ==
Calytrix pulchella is found from the Collie-Wagin district to the Ongerup-South Stirling district where it grows on sandy soils on ridges and flats in woodland, in the Avon Wheatbelt, Esperance Plains, Jarrah Forest, Mallee bioregions of south-western Western Australia.

== Conservation status ==
Calytrix pulchella is listed as "Priority Three" by the Government of Western Australia Department of Biodiversity, Conservation and Attractions, meaning that it is poorly known and known from only a few locations but is not under imminent threat.
