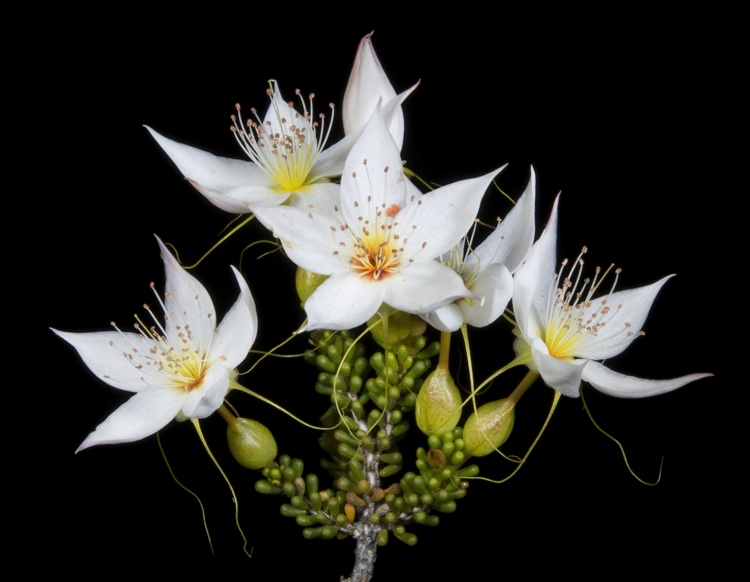

Conservation status
- Priority Three — Poorly Known Taxa (DEC)

Scientific classification
- Kingdom: Plantae
- Clade: Tracheophytes
- Clade: Angiosperms
- Clade: Eudicots
- Clade: Rosids
- Order: Myrtales
- Family: Myrtaceae
- Genus: Calytrix
- Species: C. creswellii

Binomial name
- Calytrix creswellii (F.Muell.) B.D.Jacks.

= Calytrix creswellii =

Species of flowering plant

Calytrix creswellii is a species of flowering plant in the myrtle family Myrtaceae and is endemic to inland areas of Western Australia. It is a spreading, glabrous shrub usually with egg-shaped leaves with the narrower end towards the base, and clusters of white flowers with about 40 to 55 white or yellow stamens in several rows.

== Description ==
Calytrix creswellii is a spreading, glabrous shrub that typically grows to a height of up to 0.25–1 m (9.8 in – 3 ft 3.4 in). Its leaves are egg-shaped with the narrower end towards the base, 1–3 mm (0.039–0.118 in) long, 0.6–1 mm (0.024–0.039 in) wide on a petiole 0.3–0.75 mm (0.012–0.030 in) long. There are stipules up to 0.5 mm (0.020 in) long at the base of the petioles. The floral tube is 13–17 mm (0.51–0.67 in) long and has 10 ribs. The sepals are joined for a short distance at the base, the lobes more or less round or elliptic, 3.0–4.5 mm (0.12–0.18 in) long and 3.5–5.0 mm (0.14–0.20 in) wide with an awn up to 21 mm (0.83 in) long. The petals are white, narrowly elliptic to lance-shaped, 8.0–11.5 mm (0.31–0.45 in) long and 3.5–6.0 mm (0.14–0.24 in) wide with 40 to 55 white or yellow stamens 2–11 mm (0.079–0.433 in) long. Flowering occurs from September to December.

== Taxonomy ==
This species was first formally described by Ferdinand von Mueller who gave it the name Calycothrix creswellii in his Fragmenta Phytographiae Australiae from specimens collected by Jess Young. In 1893, Benjamin Daydon Jackson transferred the species to Calytrix as C. creswellii in the Index Kewensis. The specific epithet (creswellii) honours C.F.Creswell.

== Distribution and habitat ==
This species is found on sandplains in the Lake Barlee district in the Coolgardie and Murchison bioregions of inland Western Australia.

== Conservation status ==
This species of Calytrix is listed as "Priority three" by the Government of Western Australia Department of Biodiversity, Conservation and Attractions meaning that it is poorly known and known from only a few locations but is not under imminent threat.
