= Jasonhuria =

Scientific classification
- Domain: Eukaryota
- Kingdom: Fungi
- Division: Ascomycota
- Class: Lecanoromycetes
- Order: Teloschistales
- Family: Teloschistaceae
- Genus: Jasonhuria; S.Y.Kondr., Lőkös & S.-O.Oh (2015)
- Species: J. bogilana

Binomial name
- Jasonhuria bogilana (Y.Joshi & Hur) S.Y.Kondr., Lőkös, Jung Kim, A.S.Kondr. & S.O.Oh (2015)

Synonyms
- Caloplaca bogilana Y.Joshi & Hur (2010)

Genus of fungi

Jasonhuria is a genus of lichenized fungi in the family Teloschistaceae. It is monotypic, containing only the species Jasonhuria bogilana. This species is a saxicolous (rock-dwelling), crustose lichen that occurs in South Korea.

== Taxonomy ==
The type specimen of the lichen species was collected in South Jeolla Province within Wando County, on Bogil Island. It was found at a low elevation, just 5 m (16 ft) above sea level, growing on a rock. Yogesh Joshi and Jae-Seoun Hur formally described this lichen in 2010; they classified it as a member of genus Caloplaca. In 2015, Sergey Kondratyuk, László Lőkös, and Soon-Ok Oh proposed genus Jasonhuria because molecular phylogenetic analysis showed that Caloplaca bogilana formed a clade with the genus Loekoesia, albeit with weak support. This led to the decision to establish two separate monotypic genera. The authors also noted that additional preliminary analyses had identified numerous previously unrecognised species within both Jasonhuria and Loekoesia, and that these species grouped into two distinct and strongly supported clades, further justifying the separation of Jasonhuria into its own genus. The genus name honours South Korean lichenologist Jae-Seoun Hur, who collected the type specimen in 2004.

== Description ==
Jasonhuria consists of a crustose lichen that grows on rocks. It forms a grey or greyish-white, cracked, tile-like (areolate) surface. The fruiting bodies, or apothecia, can be closely attached or slightly raised, and they range in colour from orange-brown to rust-red. These apothecia are flat or slightly convex and do not have a powdery coating (pruina). The edge of the apothecia is the same colour as the main body (the thallus) of the lichen, while the outer rim is black. Inside the apothecia, the spore-bearing tissue (hymenium) is clear, as is the underlying layer (hypothecium), and they are free of oil droplets. The true exciple, the outer ring of tissue surrounding the hymenium, has a cell structure similar to the cortex and is sometimes tinged with a bluish-green pigment. The apothecia contain thin structures (paraphyses) that are slightly enlarged at their ends. The reproductive structures (asci) typically contain eight two-chambered, ellipsoid spores with a moderately thick dividing wall (septum). Jasonhuria also has structures (pycnidia) that produce conidia (asexual spores), which are ellipsoid in shape, and the opening (ostiole) of these structures is black.

In terms of reactions to standard chemical spot tests, both the thallus and medulla of Jasonhuria bogilana are K+ (yellow), C−, Pd−, UV−. The apothecial discs are K+ (red), C−, and Pd−. The ostiolar tissue of the pycnidia and the aeruginose (bluish-green) region of the proper exciple are K−. The lichen contains atranorin, gyrophoric and lecanoric acids as major secondary metabolites (lichen products), as well as traces of parietin.

== Habitat and distribution ==
Jasonhuria bogilana is predominantly found in coastal areas, growing on large siliceous boulders. These rocks, whether positioned more or less vertically or horizontally, are typically exposed to direct sunlight. This lichen coexists with a variety of other species including Caloplaca kobeana, Endocarpon petrolepideum, Heterodermia diademata, Xanthoparmelia saxeti, as well as various species from the genera Aspicilia, Buellia, Lecanora, Phylliscum, Physcia, Ramalina, Verrucaria, and Xanthoparmelia.

Initially discovered on southern South Korea's Bogil Island, the lichen's range has since expanded. It is now found in several other locations, encompassing coastal regions, inland areas, and additional islands.
