= Loekoesia =

Scientific classification
- Domain: Eukaryota
- Kingdom: Fungi
- Division: Ascomycota
- Class: Lecanoromycetes
- Order: Teloschistales
- Family: Teloschistaceae
- Genus: Loekoesia; S.Y.Kondr., S.O.Oh & Hur (2015)

Type species
- Loekoesia austrocoreana S.Y.Kondr., J.Kim, A.S.Kondr., S.O.Oh & J.S.Hur (2015)

Species
- L. apostatica L. austrocoreana L. yuchiorum

Genus of lichen

Loekoesia is a genus of lichen-forming fungi in the family Teloschistaceae. It contains three species of saxicolous (rock-dwelling), crustose lichens. Collectively, the genus occurs in South Korea, Mauritius, and the United States. The genus is distinguished by its grey, crust-like thallus, which can be either whole or divided into patch-like segments. Loekoesia lichens have bright white, rounded soralia, which produce bluish to whitish powdery propagules (soredia) and are arranged in irregular groups on the thallus.

== Taxonomy ==
Loekoesia was circumscribed as a new genus in 2015 by the lichenologists Sergey Kondratyuk, Soon-Ok Oh, and Jae-Seoun Hur. The type species, Loekoesia austrocoreana, was shown with molecular phylogenetics to form a clade with Jasonhuria, another genus in the subfamily Caloplacoideae that was also circumscribed in the same publication. It was initially the sole species in the then monotypic genus, but two additional species were transferred from other genera (Caloplaca and Lecanora) in 2020. The genus name honours the Hungarian lichenologist László Sándor Lőkös for his contributions to the body of knowledge about lichens in North and South Korea.

== Description ==
Genus Loekoesia has lichens with a crustose thallus, which can be either whole (i.e., undivided, or entire) or broken into areolate (patch-like) segments. This thallus is typically grey in colour. Characteristic of this genus are its soralia (regions of the thallus where powdery soredia are produced), which are rounded, stipitate (having a stalk-like base), and clustered on the thallus in irregular groups. These soralia are bright white, with a soredious mass that appears bluish to whitish and has a powdery texture. The hypothallus of these lichens is bluish-black.

The apothecia (fruiting bodies) of Loekoesia lichens are black and biatorine in form, featuring a true exciple that is paraplectenchymatous (comprising fungal hyphae that are oriented in all directions) with a well-developed structural matrix. In terms of chemistry, the thallus of these lichens turns yellow and then greenish-yellow upon exposure to a solution of potassium hydroxide (i.e., the K spot test), and slowly becomes pale yellow when treated with p-phenylenediamine (the Pd spot test). The epihymenium reacts to potassium hydroxide by turning purple and becoming lighter, hyaline, or dull crimson. These reactions indicate the likely presence of atranorin and other compounds within the lichen.

== Species ==
As of January 2024, Species Fungorum (in the Catalogue of Life) accepts three species of Loekoesia:

- Loekoesia apostatica (Nyl.) Ertz & Diederich (2020) – Mauritius
- Loekoesia austrocoreana S.Y.Kondr., Jung Kim, A.S.Kondr., S.O.Oh & Hur (2015) – South Korea
- Loekoesia yuchiorum (Lendemer & C.A.Morse) Arup & Søchting (2020) – USA
