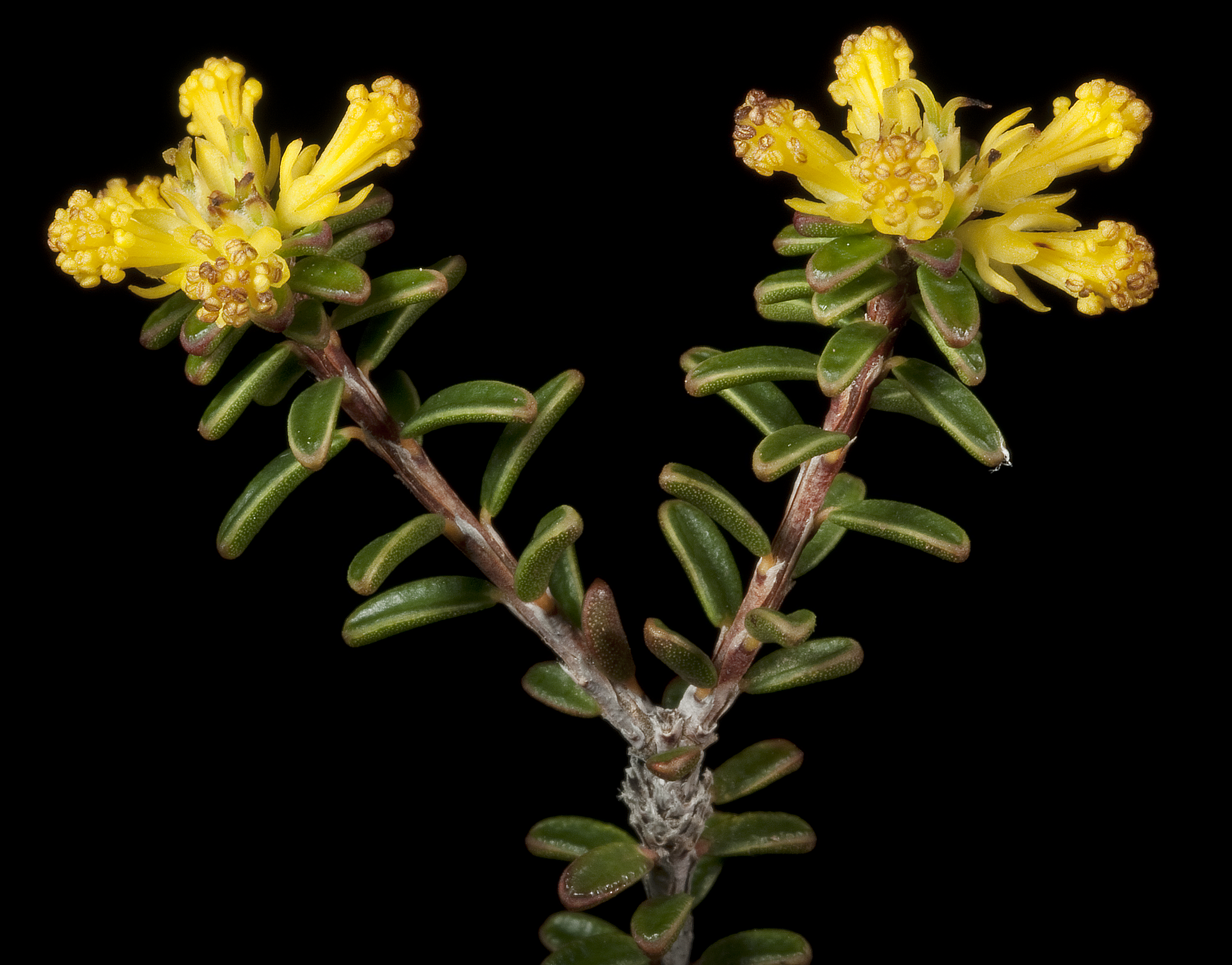

Scientific classification
- Kingdom: Plantae
- Clade: Tracheophytes
- Clade: Angiosperms
- Clade: Eudicots
- Clade: Rosids
- Order: Malpighiales
- Family: Picrodendraceae
- Genus: Stachystemon
- Species: S. polyandrus

Binomial name
- Stachystemon polyandrus (F.Muell.) Benth.

Synonyms
- Pseudanthus chryseus Müll.Arg.; Pseudanthus chrysus B.D.Jacks. orth. var.; Pseudanthus polyandrus F.Muell.

= Stachystemon polyandrus =

Species of plant

Stachystemon polyandrus is a species of flowering plant in the family Picrodendraceae and is endemic to the southwest of Western Australia. It is a diffuse to straggling, monoecious shrub with crowded, oblong, elliptic or egg-shaped leaves with the narrower end towards the base, and small yellowish-white flowers arranged singly in upper leaf axils, but forming clusters at the ends of branches.

== Description ==
Stachystemon polyandrus is a diffuse to straggling, monoecious shrub that typically grows to a height of up to 50 cm (20 in) and has smooth, glabrous branchlets. Its leaves are crowded near the ends of branchlets, oblong, elliptic or egg-shaped with the narrower end towards the base, 2–4 mm (0.079–0.157 in) long and 1.1–1.4 mm (0.043–0.055 in) wide on a petiole 0.4–0.7 mm (0.016–0.028 in), with reddish-brown, narrowly triangular stipules 0.5–0.9 mm (0.020–0.035 in) long at the base. Both sides of the leaves are more or less glabrous, but the lower surface is pimply. The flowers are arranged singly in upper leaf axils forming clusters on the ends of branches with reddish brown, triangular bracts 1.0–1.9 mm (0.039–0.075 in) long and one or two similar, but smaller bracteoles at the base. Male flowers are on a stout pedicel 1–2 mm (0.039–0.079 in) long with four to six narrowly egg-shaped yellow tepals 1.5–2.5 mm (0.059–0.098 in) long and 0.5–0.8 mm (0.020–0.031 in) wide. There are 10 to 14 stamens, the anthers yellow. Female flowers are sessile and have 6 tepals narrowly egg-shaped to egg-shaped, 2.0–3.2 mm (0.079–0.126 in) long, 1.0–1.5 mm (0.039–0.059 in) wide and prominently keeled. Flowering has been observed in June and from September to January, and the fruit is a flattened oval capsule 3.5–5.2 mm (0.14–0.20 in) long and 3.3–3.5 mm (0.13–0.14 in) wide.

== Taxonomy ==
This species was first formally described in 1861 by Ferdinand von Mueller who gave it the name Pseudanthus polyandrus in Fragmenta Phytographiae Australiae from specimens collected at Cape Le Grand by George Maxwell. In 1873, George Bentham transferred the species to Stachystemon as S. polyandrus in Flora Australiensis. The species epithet, polyandrus, derives from the Greek poly- ("many") and aner - andros ("man"), and thus describes the plant as having many stamens.

== Distribution and habitat ==
Stachystemon polyandrus grows on plains and gentle hillslopes in heath, sometimes on rocky ridges and on coastal sand dunes between Kulin, the Fitzgerald River National Park and Israelite Bay in the Avon Wheatbelt, Esperance Plains and Mallee bioregions of south-western Western Australia.
