= Olearia elaeophila =

Scientific classification
- Kingdom: Plantae
- Clade: Tracheophytes
- Clade: Angiosperms
- Clade: Eudicots
- Clade: Asterids
- Order: Asterales
- Family: Asteraceae
- Genus: Olearia
- Species: O. elaeophila

Binomial name
- Olearia elaeophila (A.Cunn. ex DC.) F.Muell. exBenth.

Synonyms
- List: Aster elaeophilus A.Cunn. ex DC. nom. inval., pro syn.; Aster elaeophilus (A.Cunn. ex DC.) F.Muell.; Aster heleophilus F.Muell. orth. var.; Aster preissii F.Muell.; Eurybia affinis Steetz; Eurybia elaeophila A.Cunn. ex DC.; Eurybia paniculata Steetz; Olearia elaeophila (A.Cunn. ex DC.) F.Muell. ex Benth. var. elaeophila; Olearia heleophila F.Muell. nom. inval., pro syn.; Olearia heliophila A.D.Chapm. orth. var.; Olearia heliophila A.D.Chapm. var. heliophila orth. var.; Shawia affinis (Steetz) Sch.Bip.; Shawia elaeophila (A.Cunn. ex DC.) Sch.Bip.; Shawia steetzii Sch.Bip.; Shawia steezii B.D.Jacks. orth. var.

Species of shrub

Olearia elaeophila is a species of flowering plant in the family Asteraceae and is endemic to the south-west of Western Australia. It is a small shrub with scattered linear leaves, and white or blue and yellow, daisy-like inflorescences.

== Description ==
Olearia elaeophila is a shrub that typically grows to a height of up to 50 cm (20 in). Its stems and leaves are covered with cobwebby or woolly hairs. It has scattered, usually elliptic leaves arranged alternately along the branchlets, 2–30 mm (0.079–1.181 in) long and 0.25–2.5 mm (0.0098–0.0984 in) wide on a petiole up to 2 mm (0.079 in) long. Both surfaces of the leaves are more or less glabrous. The heads or daisy-like "flowers" are in panicles or racemes on the ends of branchlets and are 8–17 mm (0.31–0.67 in) in diameter on a peduncle 4–10 mm (0.16–0.39 in) long. Each head has ten to seventeen white or blue ray florets, the ligule 3.5–7.5 mm (0.14–0.30 in) long, surrounding seventeen or eighteen yellow disc florets. Flowering occurs in April and May and the fruit is a densely hairy achene, the pappus with 18 to 29 long bristles and a smaller number of short ones.

== Taxonomy ==
This daisy bush was first formally described in 1836 by Augustin Pyramus de Candolle who gave it the name Eurybia elaeophila in his Prodromus Systematis Naturalis Regni Vegetabilis, based on an unpublished description by Allan Cunningham. In 1867 George Bentham changed that name to Olearia elaeophila in Flora Australiensis. The specific epithet (elaeophila) means "marsh-loving".

== Distribution and habitat ==
Olearia elaeophila grows in sedge, heath, shrubland, woodland and forest in winter-wet places in the Avon Wheatbelt, Jarrah Forest, Swan Coastal Plain and Warren biogeographic regions of south-western Western Australia.

== Conservation status ==
This daisy bush is listed as "not threatened" by the Department of Biodiversity, Conservation and Attractions.
