= Kew Rule =

Historical rule for derterming synonyms in botany

The Kew Rule was used by some authors to determine the application of synonymous names in botanical nomenclature up to about 1906, but was and still is contrary to codes of botanical nomenclature including the International Code of Nomenclature for algae, fungi, and plants. Index Kewensis, a publication that aimed to list all botanical names for seed plants at the ranks of species and genus, used the Kew Rule until its Supplement IV was published in 1913 (prepared 1906–1910).

The Kew Rule applied rules of priority in a more flexible way, so that when transferring a species to a new genus, there was no requirement to retain the epithet of the original species name, and future priority of the new name was counted from the time the species was transferred to the new genus. The effect has been summarized as "nomenclature used by an established monographer or in a major publication should be adopted". This is contrary to the modern article 11.4 of the Code of Nomenclature.

== History ==
=== Beginnings ===
The first discussion in print of what was to become known as the Kew Rule appears to have occurred in 1877 between Henry Trimen and Alphonse Pyramus de Candolle. Trimen did not think it was reasonable for older names discovered in the literature to destabilize the nomenclature that had been well accepted:

Probably all botanists are agreed that it is very desirable to retain when possible old specific names, but some of the best authors do not certainly consider themselves bound by any generally accepted rule in this matter. Still less will they be inclined to allow that a writer is at liberty, as M. de Candolle thinks, to reject the specific appellations made by an author whose genera are accepted, in favour of older ones in other genera. It will appear to such that to do this is to needlessly create in each case another synonym.

=== The end ===
The first botanical code of nomenclature that declared itself to be binding was the 1906 publication Règles internationales de la nomenclature botanique adoptées par le Congres International de Botanique de Vienne 1905 that followed from the 1905 International Botanical Congress. The Kew Rule was outlawed by this code.

The end of the Kew Rule brought about considerable upheaval in botanical nomenclature. Many new species names were coined to resurrect older epithets, for example, in 1917 Willis Jepson wrote:

"The plant so long known as Brodiaea grandiflora Smith ... [was] first published as Hookera coronaria Salisbury (1806). The correct name, then, is Brodiaea coronaria Jepson, n. comb."

Names that had previously been conserved to improve the stability of well-known plant names often now no longer required conservation, and other names that had been formed using the Kew Rule and had become well known, were illegitimate. The entire previous list of conserved and rejected names was consequently replaced in 1959 with a reworked list.

Previously overlooked botanical literature has continued to yield new examples of forgotten older names for more than 100 years since the Kew Rule was banished from the International Code of Nomenclature.
