= Lecanora loekoesii =

Scientific classification
- Kingdom: Fungi
- Division: Ascomycota
- Class: Lecanoromycetes
- Order: Lecanorales
- Family: Lecanoraceae
- Genus: Lecanora
- Species: L. loekoesii

Binomial name
- Lecanora loekoesii L.Lü, Y.Joshi & Hur (2011)

Species of lichen

Lecanora loekoesii is a rare species of corticolous (bark-dwelling), crustose lichen in the family Lecanoraceae. It was described in 2011 from a specimen collected on oak bark in the mountains of South Korea and was named in honour of the Hungarian lichenologist László Sándor Lőkös. The lichen forms a thin, grey crust with small yellowish-brown circular fruiting bodies dotting its surface. Originally known only from Korea, it has since been found in several Chinese provinces and on Sakhalin Island in Russia.

== Taxonomy ==
The lichen was formally described as a new species in 2011 by Lei Lü, Yogesh Joshi, and Jae-Seoun Hur. The type specimen was collected on Mount Taebaek (Taebaek, Gangwon Province) at an altitude of 910 m (2,990 ft); here it was found growing on oak bark. The specific epithet loekoesii honours the Hungarian lichenologist László Sándor Lőkös, who collected the type specimen.

== Description ==
Lecanora loekoesii grows as a thin, grey crust on tree bark. The lichenised "body" (thallus) hugs the surface so tightly that it looks painted on (a growth form called crustose). It is continuous rather than patchy and can feel smooth or slightly rough; there is no powdery coating (pruina) on the surface and no production of sorediate granules for vegetative reproduction. A distinct dark boundary (prothallus) is absent.

The fruit bodies (apothecia) are abundant and sit directly on the crust, each 0.4–1 mm across. They have a construction typical of Lecanora: a fleshy rim made of thallus tissue (a thalline margin) surrounding a disc. The margin is usually whitish-grey and thinner than the surrounding crust, while the disc is yellow-brown and may carry a light dusting of white pruina. Microscopic sections show that the rim contains many minute, K-soluble crystals and lacks a proper outer cortex. The upper part of the spore-bearing layer (epihymenium) is golden brown and studded with fine granules that also dissolve in potassium hydroxide (K). The "fine granules" were later interpreted as "coarse granules" by Chinese lichenologists after studying Chinese specimens. Beneath this, the clear hymenium is about 65 μm tall, sitting on a colourless subhymenium and hypothecium.

Inside each club-shaped ascus are 12–16 colourless, single-celled ascospores. These spores are ellipsoid, measuring roughly 13–15 μm long by 7.5–8.5 μm wide, with very thin walls (< 0.7 μm). No flask-shaped pycnidia (structures that make asexual spores) have been observed in the species. Standard chemical spot tests on the thallus yield K+ (yellow), KC+ (yellow), and P+ (yellow) reactions, matching the presence of the secondary metabolites atranorin, usnic acid, zeorin, and norstictic acid.

In 2017, the species Lecanora subloekoesii was described from specimens collected from Heilongjiang, China; it differs from its namesake L. loekoesii in the brown to reddish-brown colour of its apothecial discs, and its eight-spored asci.

== Habitat and distribution ==
Originally known only from the type locality in South Korea, Lecanora loekoesii was later recorded from China, with records from Heilongjiang, Jilin, Liaoning, Hubei, Shaanxi, and Tibet. Its known range was expanded even more when it was reported from Sakhalin Island in the Russian Far East in 2018.

== See also ==
- List of Lecanora species
