= Stachystemon brachyphyllus =

Scientific classification
- Kingdom: Plantae
- Clade: Tracheophytes
- Clade: Angiosperms
- Clade: Eudicots
- Clade: Rosids
- Order: Malpighiales
- Family: Picrodendraceae
- Genus: Stachystemon
- Species: S. brachyphyllus

Binomial name
- Stachystemon brachyphyllus Müll.Arg.

Species of shrub

Stachystemon brachyphyllus is a species of flowering plant in the family Picrodendraceae and is endemic to the south-west of Western Australia. It is a monoecious shrub with simple, narrowly elliptic to elliptic or oblong leaves and small yellow, red, purple and brown flowers arranged singly in upper leaf axils.

== Description ==
Stachystemon brachyphyllus is a diffuse to compact shrub that typically grows to a height of up to 70 cm (28 in) and has glabrous branchlets. Its leaves are narrowly elliptic to elliptic or oblong, 3.2–6.7 mm (0.13–0.26 in) long and 1.1–1.9 mm (0.043–0.075 in) wide on a petiole 0.3–0.5 mm (0.012–0.020 in) long with reddish brown, narrowly triangular to triangular stipules 0.5–1.7 mm (0.020–0.067 in) long at the base. Both sides of the leaves are more or less glabrous. The flowers are arranged singly in upper leaf axils forming clusters on the ends of branches with reddish brown, bract-like leaves at the base. Male flowers are on a stout pedicel 1.5–3.5 mm (0.059–0.138 in) long, usually with 6 more or less similar red tepals 1.7–3.3 mm (0.067–0.130 in) long and 0.5–1 mm (0.020–0.039 in) wide and there are 25 or more stamens, the anthers purplish red or brown. Female flowers have 6 yellow tepals 2.0–4.1 mm (0.079–0.161 in) long and 1.5–1.9 mm (0.059–0.075 in) wide. Flowering occurs from June to January, and the fruit is a flattened oval capsule 4.7–5.0 mm (0.19–0.20 in) long and 3.5–3.8 mm (0.14–0.15 in) in diameter.

== Taxonomy and naming ==
Stachystemon brachyphyllus was first formally described in 1863 by Johannes Müller Argoviensis in the journal Linnaea from specimens collected by James Drummond in the Swan River Colony in 1848. The specific epithet (brachyphyllus) means "short-leaved".

== Distribution and habitat ==
This stachystemon grows on dunes and flats in heath, mallee and low woodland from Wongan Hills to the Cape Arid National Park in the Avon Wheatbelt, Coolgardie, Esperance Plains, Geraldton Sandplains, Mallee and Swan Coastal Plain bioregions of south-western Western Australia.
