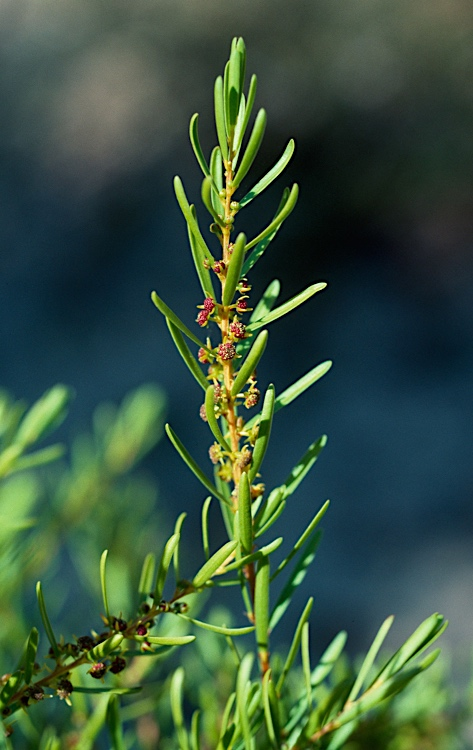
- In Kings Park, Western Australia

Scientific classification
- Kingdom: Plantae
- Clade: Tracheophytes
- Clade: Angiosperms
- Clade: Eudicots
- Clade: Rosids
- Order: Malpighiales
- Family: Picrodendraceae
- Genus: Stachystemon
- Species: S. axillaris

Binomial name
- Stachystemon axillaris A.S.George

= Stachystemon axillaris =

Species of shrub

Stachystemon axillaris, commonly known as leafy stachystemon, is a species of flowering plant in the family Picrodendraceae and is endemic to the south-west of Western Australia. It is a monoecious shrub with simple, linear to narrowly elliptic or oblong leaves and small yellow flowers arranged singly in upper leaf axils.

== Description ==
Stachystemon axillaris is a shrub that typically grows to a height of up to 1.2 m (3 ft 11 in) and has glabrous branchlets. Its leaves are linear to narrowly elliptic or oblong, mostly 10–30 mm (0.39–1.18 in) long and 1.2–2.6 mm (0.047–0.102 in) wide on a petiole 0.7–1.7 mm (0.028–0.067 in) long with pale brown, narrowly triangular stipules 1.0–1.7 mm (0.039–0.067 in) long at the base. Both sides of the leaves are glabrous. The flowers are arranged singly or in small groups in upper leaf axils with up to 3 bracts at the base. Male flowers are on a slender pedicel 1.5–2.5 mm (0.059–0.098 in) long, the 6 tepals yellow, the 3 outer tepals 1.0–1.8 mm (0.039–0.071 in) long and 0.8–1.3 mm (0.031–0.051 in) wide and there are 50 to 70 stamens, the anthers red, turning brown. Female flowers are on a stout pedicel 0.2–0.7 mm (0.0079–0.0276 in) long, the 6 tepals similar to each other, greenish-yellow, 1.5–2.0 mm (0.059–0.079 in) long and 0.8–1.1 mm (0.031–0.043 in) wide. Flowering occurs from February to October, and the fruit is a flattened oval capsule 5.0–6.2 mm (0.20–0.24 in) long.

== Taxonomy and naming ==
Stachystemon axillaris was first formally described in 1968 by Alex George in the Journal of the Royal Society of Western Australia from specimens he collected near the Mogumber siding in 1965. The specific epithet (axillaris) means "axillary", referring to the flowers.

== Distribution and habitat ==
Leafy stachystemon grows on sandplains in the area between Kalbarri National Park, Three Springs, Moora and Wanneroo in the Avon Wheatbelt, Geraldton Sandplains, Jarrah Forest and Swan Coastal Plain bioregions of south-western Western Australia.
