= Fungal Names =

Global data repository of fungal taxonomy

- Website type: Fungal nomenclatural repository and knowledge base
- Available in: English
- Headquarters: Beijing, China
- Owners: Institute of Microbiology, Chinese Academy of Sciences
- Website: https://nmdc.cn/fungalnames/
- Commercial: no
- Registration: Optional (browsing); required for submissions
- Launched: September 2011

Fungal Names (FN) is one of three internationally recognised repositories for the registration of fungal names, alongside Index Fungorum and MycoBank. It is operated by the State Key Laboratory of Mycology at the Institute of Microbiology, Chinese Academy of Sciences. The platform was launched in 2011 and was recognised in 2012 by the Nomenclature Committee for Fungi (NCF) and ratified by the International Mycological Association as an official registration repository. Under the International Code of Nomenclature, new fungal names published on or after 1 January 2013—and lecto-, neo-, or epitypifications on or after 1 January 2019—must cite an identifier issued by one of the recognised repositories; FN issues such identifiers and synchronises registrations with the other repositories. As of early 2022, FN indexed more than 567,000 taxon names and 147,000 type records and integrates links to specimens, culture collections and herbaria/fungaria, publications, and taxonomists.

== History ==
The creation of FN followed long-recognised problems in fungal nomenclature, where historical literature and databases contain synonymy, homonymy, isonymy, orthographical variants, and misapplied names that hinder unambiguous usage. Under Chapter F of the Code, Art. F.5 requires nomenclatural novelties published on or after 1 January 2013 to cite an identifier issued by a recognised repository, and from 1 January 2019 applies the same registration requirement to lectotypifications, neotypifications, and epitypifications. Contemporary best-practice guidance for authors summarises these obligations and identifies the three recognised repositories as Fungal Names, Index Fungorum, and MycoBank. FN was established in September 2011 and, in December 2012, was recognised as one of the three global registration repositories together with Index Fungorum and MycoBank. Identifiers are unique and mutually accepted among the three systems; at the time of publication (2023) FN was allocating numbers in the 570000–579999 range, and the repositories share updates via application programming interfaces on a regular schedule. Contemporary accounts also described MycoBank's role as a coordination hub facilitating data exchange among the three repositories during the roll-out of mandatory registration.

== Scope and purpose ==
FN serves simultaneously as a registration platform for nomenclatural novelties (new taxa, new combinations, replacement names, and names at new ranks) and as a knowledge base that integrates nomenclature with information on types, preserving agencies, culture collections, herbaria/fungaria, publications, and the researchers who publish fungal names. By standardising names and cross-linking to external resources (including Index Fungorum, MycoBank, and NCBI Taxonomy), FN aims to reduce inconsistency, prevent homonymy at the point of registration, and facilitate reliable data exchange and retrieval across fungal biodiversity resources.

== Functions and features ==
The registration workflow issues an identifier immediately on submission, followed by administrator review (typically within 24 hours). If revision is requested and no response is received within the set period, a pre-issued identifier may be withdrawn. During submission, the system normalises input by offering controlled options for author names, preserving agencies, and collection countries, and it checks the proposed name against a standardised reference of existing fungal names to avoid creating homonyms. In addition to the 27 principal and secondary ranks used in fungal taxonomy, FN accommodates "other rank" to capture exceptional or transitional usages proposed in the literature.

Search and display functions allow queries by rank (from infraspecific taxa to higher categories), epithet, year of publication, and registration identifier; author, journal, and preserving agency records have interlinked detail pages. These show taxonomy, typification, bibliography, and cross-references to the other repositories where available. FN also provides an internal transcribed spacer (ITS) sequence alignment tool (using UNITE data) for preliminary specimen identification, returning alignments, a simple tree view, and links to corresponding entries in FN and NCBI. A name-standardisation tool implements the "one fungus, one name" principle by resolving misspellings and variant usages to a current name; a fuzzy-search option lists similarly spelled names with identity percentages to help users reach the correct record when input is uncertain.

== Data content and processing ==
FN includes over 567,000 taxon names spanning fungi sensu lato (including fossil fungi and historical fungus-like taxa), with more than 149,000 current species-level names. It stores over 120,000 collection records of type specimens and several thousand records of type illustrations, and it integrates more than 10,000 mycology-related journals and books that have published fungal names. The system also maintains an author dataset covering more than 25,000 taxonomists and some 750,000 author–name pairings derived from published records. Newly released names and updates are exchanged among the three recognised repositories on a monthly cycle, including nomenclatural changes, types, classification, and new registrations.

To support consistent retrieval, historical rank denotations (over one hundred terms) are reclassified to fourteen standard principal and secondary ranks; records are cleaned, validated, and cross-linked to Index Fungorum, MycoBank, and NCBI Taxonomy. Typification data (holotypes, lectotypes, epitypes, and neotypes) are mapped to biorepositories, and abbreviations for culture collections and herbaria/fungaria are normalised against public standards. FN links type strains to the Global Catalogue of Microorganisms where numbers are available, and integrates datasets covering hundreds of culture collections and several thousand herbaria and fungaria worldwide.

== Statistics and usage ==
The database provides a live dashboard of counts for names, typifications, taxonomists, publications, and preserving agencies, along with geographic summaries. Historical trends indicate slow growth in published names up to the late nineteenth century, a pronounced rise from the 1870s to the century's end, a mid-twentieth-century lull, and renewed acceleration from the late twentieth century onwards linked to molecular methods and DNA barcoding. As of early 2022, typification information was available for roughly 147,000 names, including more than 120,000 collection records of specimens and thousands of type illustrations; most currently used genera had a designated type species, and a substantial proportion of current species-level names had indexed types with preserving agency details. The largest single holdings of fungal type material are concentrated in a small number of culture collections and herbaria/fungaria in Europe, Asia, Oceania, Africa, and North America, reflecting the global spread of curated mycological resources.

== Access and availability ==
FN is free to access for academic use via a public website and exposes an API for programmatic data exchange. The repositories coordinate to share new registrations and updates at regular intervals, ensuring that identifiers and typification events are discoverable across platforms and that downstream databases can resolve names consistently.
