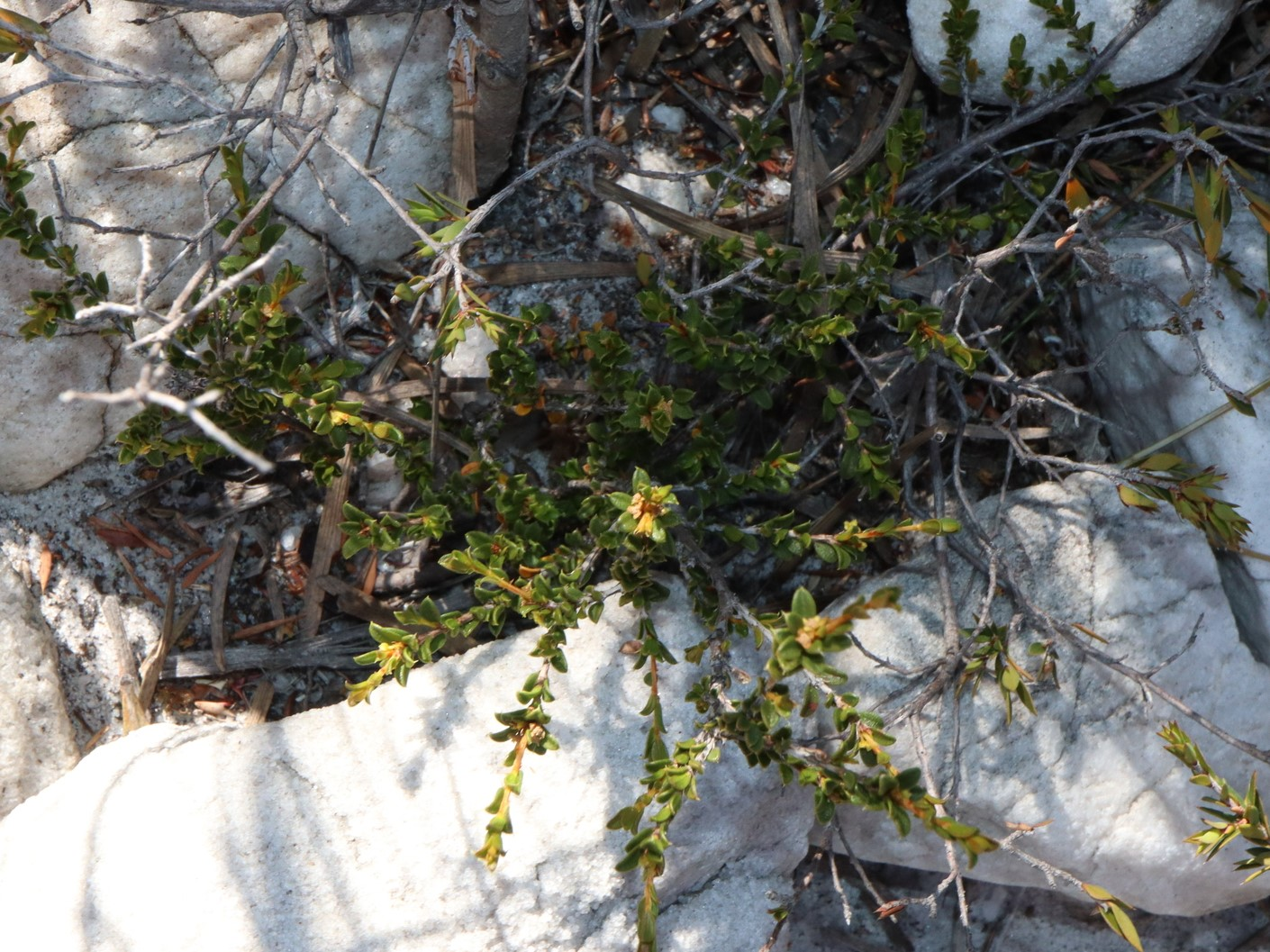

Scientific classification
- Kingdom: Plantae
- Clade: Tracheophytes
- Clade: Angiosperms
- Clade: Eudicots
- Clade: Rosids
- Order: Malpighiales
- Family: Picrodendraceae
- Genus: Stachystemon
- Species: S. mucronatus

Binomial name
- Stachystemon mucronatus Halford & R.J.F.Hend.

= Stachystemon mucronatus =

Species of shrub

Stachystemon mucronatus is a species of flowering plant in the family Picrodendraceae and is endemic to the south-west of Western Australia. It is a compact, monoecious shrub with narrowly oblong or narrowly elliptic leaves and small, greenish yellow flowers arranged singly in upper leaf axils.

== Description ==
Stachystemon mucronatus is a compact, monoecious shrub that typically grows to a height of up to 80 cm (31 in) and has glabrous branchlets. Its leaves are narrowly oblong or narrowly elliptic, 2.7–10.2 mm (0.11–0.40 in) long and 1.2–2.5 mm (0.047–0.098 in) wide on a petiole 0.6–0.8 mm (0.024–0.031 in) long with reddish brown, narrowly triangular stipules 1.2–3.0 mm (0.047–0.118 in) long at the base. Both sides of the leaves are glabrous. The flowers are arranged singly in upper leaf axils forming clusters on the ends of branches with reddish brown bracts 1.3–1.6 mm (0.051–0.063 in) long at the base. Male flowers are on a slender pedicel 0.5–0.8 mm (0.020–0.031 in) long, usually with four greenish yellow tepals 1.0–1.7 mm (0.039–0.067 in) long and there are 7 to 15 yellow stamens. Female flowers usually have four yellow tepals 1.9–3.0 mm (0.075–0.118 in) long. Flowering has been observed in April and from August to November, and the fruit is a more or less flattened oval capsule 5–7 mm (0.20–0.28 in) long and 2.2–3.0 mm (0.087–0.118 in) wide.

== Taxonomy and naming ==
Stachystemon mucronatus was first formally described in 2003 by David Halford and Rodney Henderson in the journal Austrobaileya from specimens collected by Henderson, 48 km (30 mi) from Ravensthorpe in 1988. The specific epithet (mucronatus) means "possessing a hard, sharp point", referring to the leaves.

== Distribution and habitat ==
This stachystemon grows in heath on mountains and hill tops and in shrubland on plains in the Fitzgerald River National Park and between Ravensthorpe and Esperance in the Esperance Plains bioregion of south-western Western Australia.
