= Stachystemon virgatus =

Scientific classification
- Kingdom: Plantae
- Clade: Tracheophytes
- Clade: Angiosperms
- Clade: Eudicots
- Clade: Rosids
- Order: Malpighiales
- Family: Picrodendraceae
- Genus: Stachystemon
- Species: S. virgatus

Binomial name
- Stachystemon virgatus (Klotzsch) Halford & R.J.F.Hend.

Synonyms
- Chorizotheca micrantheoides Müll.Arg.; Chrysostemon virgatus Klotzsch; Pseudanthus nitidus Müll.Arg.; Pseudanthus occidentalis F.Muell.; Pseudanthus virgatus (Klotzsch) Müll.Arg.

Species of plant

Stachystemon virgatus is a species of flowering plant in the family Picrodendraceae and is endemic to the southwest of Western Australia. It is a compact monoecious shrub with elliptic or narrowly oblong leaves and small yellow flowers arranged singly in upper leaf axils.

== Description ==
Stachystemon virgatus is a compact, monoecious shrub that typically grows to a height of up to 40 cm (16 in) and has smooth, glabrous branchlets. Its leaves are well-spaced along the stems and branchlets, elliptic or narrowly oblong, 1.9–9.7 mm (0.075–0.382 in) long and 1.3–3.1 mm (0.051–0.122 in) wide on a petiole 0.4–0.8 mm (0.016–0.031 in), with tapering stipules 0.9–1.6 mm (0.035–0.063 in) long at the base. The flowers are arranged singly in upper leaf axils with narrowly triangular, glabrous bracts 0.2–0.4 mm (0.0079–0.0157 in) long and one or two similar, but smaller bracteoles at the base. Male flowers are on a stout pedicel 1.5–3 mm (0.059–0.118 in) long with usually 4 egg-shaped, yellow tepals, 1.1–1.8 mm (0.043–0.071 in) long and 0.8–1.1 mm (0.031–0.043 in) wide. There are mostly 10 to 14 stamens, the anthers yellow. Female flowers are sessile or on a pedicel up to 0.8 mm (0.031 in) long and usually have 4 narrowly egg-shaped, greenish-yellow tepals 1.0–1.8 mm (0.039–0.071 in) long and 0.3–0.6 mm (0.012–0.024 in) wide. Flowering has been observed from September to November, and the fruit is an elliptical or oval capsule 4.5–6.0 mm (0.18–0.24 in) long.

== Taxonomy ==
This species was first formally described in 1848 by Johann Friedrich Klotzsch, who gave it the name Chrysostemon virgatus in Lehmann's Plantae Preissianae near York in 1839. In 2003, David Halford and Rodney Henderson transferred the species to the genus Stachystemon as S. virgatus in the journal Austrobaileya. The specific epithet (virgatus) means "having long, slender branches".

== Distribution and habitat ==
Stachystemon virgatus along the coast of Western Australia between the Stirling Range and Esperance and between Busselton, Bunbury and near York. It grows in mallee heath, in woodland, heath on sandplain, in rocky crevices and in swampy areas.
