= Index Fungorum =

International project to index all formal (scientific) names in the fungus kingdom

- Website type: Database
- Owner: Index Fungorum Partnership
- Creator: Index Fungorum Partnership
- Website: IndexFungorum.org
- Commercial: No
- Registration: Not required

Index Fungorum is an international project to index all formal names (scientific names) in the fungus kingdom. As of 2015, the project is based at the Royal Botanic Gardens, Kew, one of three partners along with Landcare Research and the Institute of Microbiology, Chinese Academy of Sciences.

It is somewhat comparable to the International Plant Names Index (IPNI), in which the Royal Botanic Gardens is also involved. A difference is that where IPNI does not indicate correct names, the Index Fungorum does indicate the status of a name. In the results from the search page, a currently-correct name is indicated in green, while others are in blue (a few aberrant usages of names are indicated in red). All names are linked to pages giving the correct name with lists of synonyms.

Index Fungorum is one of three nomenclatural repositories recognized by the Nomenclature Committee for Fungi; the others are MycoBank and Fungal Names. As of 2023, over a million fungal names have been linked to persistent identifiers for their associated publications across these three databases, with Index Fungorum contributing significantly to this effort.

== History and development ==
The history of fungal name indexing dates back to the early 19th century, with several notable compilations leading to the creation of Index Fungorum. One of the earliest comprehensive attempts was Pier Andrea Saccardo's "Sylloge Fungorum" (1882–1931), which aimed to compile all known fungal names and their descriptions. In the 20th century, Franz Petrak's "Lists" (1920–1939) continued this tradition, providing a comprehensive index of new fungal names and literature sources. In recent years, Index Fungorum has been transitioning from post-publication indexing to pre-publication registration. This shift aims to streamline the process of recording new fungal names and nomenclatural acts. As part of this transition, Index Fungorum is developing an automated registration-to-publication pipeline in collaboration with other major taxonomic name registries.

The development of Index Fungorum can be traced through various institutional changes. It originated from efforts at the Imperial Bureau of Mycology, established in 1920, which later became the Commonwealth Mycological Institute in 1948. In 1986, it became part of CAB International, eventually evolving into the current Index Fungorum project. As of 2016, plans were underway to move the Index Fungorum system to the Royal Botanic Gardens, Kew, where it would operate alongside the International Plant Names Index. This move is expected to facilitate closer integration between plant and fungal name registration systems.

Since 1 January 2013, new fungal names must cite an identifier issued by a recognized repository prior to publication, as mandated by the International Code of Nomenclature for algae, fungi, and plants. This requirement has further solidified the importance of Index Fungorum and its counterparts in the field of fungal taxonomy.

== Content and scope ==
Index Fungorum aims to be a comprehensive list of all fungal names that have ever been validly defined. This includes names that may be conflicting or no longer in use. The database covers a wide range of nomenclatural acts, including new taxa at all ranks from suprafamilial to infraspecific, new replacement names, new combinations, and various types of typifications. It also incorporates names of lichen-forming fungi, which were historically sometimes treated separately. As of 1 January 2019, Index Fungorum also registers new type designations for previously described taxa at or below the rank of species. This includes lectotypifications, neotypifications, and epitypifications. These typification acts must be registered and the identifier cited in the publication.

The main part of Index Fungorum is intended to be a global list of all fungal names that have ever been validly defined, but many of them are conflicting or no longer used. Species Fungorum is a closely related project based at the Royal Botanical Gardens, Kew supported by CABI to decide a consistent subset of the Index Fungorum names which can be recommended as currently valid. It is possible to search in either the Index Fungorum or the Species Fungorum list separately and the Index Fungorum results also give a cross-reference to Species Fungorum where an entry is available - names without such a reference are generally only of historical interest and should not be considered reliable for present use.

Compiling a comprehensive index of fungal names presents several challenges. These include dealing with obsolete names, the difficulty of searching worldwide journals for new names, and the need to handle the increasing volume of new fungal taxa being described. The development of electronic databases has helped address some of these issues, but the task remains complex and ongoing. To standardize its data format and improve interoperability with other systems, Index Fungorum plans to adopt the Taxon Concept Schema as its basic standard for registration and indexing of new names and other nomenclatural acts.

One particular challenge in compiling fungal names is the "long tail" problem, where many names are published in small, obscure publications. This makes it difficult to achieve complete coverage of the literature, especially for older publications.

== Features and services ==
Index Fungorum provides Life Science Identifiers (LSIDs) for records in its database. This feature helps in uniquely identifying and referencing fungal taxa across different databases and publications. Index Fungorum is developing an XML-based, machine-to-machine workflow for registration. This automated process is designed to work with publishers' systems, allowing for efficient pre-publication registration of fungal names. The system is part of a broader effort to create a standardized registration process across multiple taxonomic name registries. While MycoBank emerged as the predominant registration system by 2020, with 97.7% of newly described taxa utilising it for registration numbers, Index Fungorum maintains a vital complementary role as a widely used system for querying general nomenclatural information about fungal names. This complementary relationship between the two databases helps serve different needs within the mycological community.

The concept of name registration for fungi has evolved over time. In recent years, this has led to the development of online registration systems like MycoBank, which work alongside Index Fungorum to ensure that new fungal names are properly recorded and made available to the scientific community.

Index Fungorum also provides a SOAP protocol web service for searching its database and retrieving records. A WSDL file describing the services is available. Index Fungorum adheres to the FAIR data principles (Findable, Accessible, Interoperable and Reusable), which are necessary for the effective sharing and utilisation of scientific data. This commitment enhances the database's utility for researchers and its integration with other biodiversity informatics resources. Index Fungorum is one of three official registries for fungal names, alongside MycoBank and Fungal Names, as recognized by the International Nomenclature Committee for Fungi. These three repositories synchronize their data monthly to maintain consistency across platforms. This system ensures that the mycological community has access to up-to-date and harmonized nomenclatural information. The collaboration between these repositories represents a significant advancement in the standardization and accessibility of fungal nomenclature.

To facilitate the accurate recording and retrieval of fungal nomenclature data, Index Fungorum recommends specific standards for specimen metadata. This includes detailed information about the collection location, habitat, substrate, collection date, and repository information. These standards help ensure that the database provides comprehensive and useful information for taxonomists and other researchers.

== See also ==
- Australian Plant Name Index
- Index Kewensis
- Bibliography of Systematic Mycology
