= Stachystemon vermicularis =

Scientific classification
- Kingdom: Plantae
- Clade: Tracheophytes
- Clade: Angiosperms
- Clade: Eudicots
- Clade: Rosids
- Order: Malpighiales
- Family: Picrodendraceae
- Genus: Stachystemon
- Species: S. vermicularis

Binomial name
- Stachystemon vermicularis Planch.

Synonyms
- Pseudanthus vermicularis (Planch.) F.Muell.; Stachystemon vermiculare Planch. orth. var.

Species of plant

Stachystemon vermicularis is a species of flowering plant in the family Picrodendraceae and is endemic to the southwest of Western Australia. It is a diffuse, monoecious shrub with linear leaves and small red male flowers and yellowish female flowers arranged singly in upper leaf axils, but forming clusters at the ends of branches.

== Description ==
Stachystemon vermicularis is a diffuse, glabrous, monoecious shrub that typically grows to a height of up to 1 m (3 ft 3 in) and has smooth, glabrous branchlets. Its leaves are well-spaced along the stems and branchlets, linear, 4.5–30 mm (0.18–1.18 in) long and 1.0–1.3 mm (0.039–0.051 in) wide on a petiole 0.6–1.2 mm (0.024–0.047 in), with pale brown, narrowly triangular stipules 1.1–1.5 mm (0.043–0.059 in) long at the base. Both sides of the leaves are more or less glabrous, but the edges of the leaves are pimply. The flowers are arranged singly in upper leaf axils forming clusters on the ends of branches with reddish brown, triangular bracts 1.7–2.2 mm (0.067–0.087 in) long and one or two similar, but smaller bracteoles at the base. Male flowers are on a stout pedicel 1.5–1.6 mm (0.059–0.063 in) long with 6 linear to egg-shaped, red tepals 1.5–2.0 mm (0.059–0.079 in) long and 0.3–0.7 mm (0.012–0.028 in) wide. There are many stamens, the anthers purplish-red. Female flowers are sessile or on a slender pedicel up to 0.5 mm (0.020 in) long and have 5 or 6 yellowish, narrowly egg-shaped to egg-shaped tepals 2.0–4.8 mm (0.079–0.189 in) long, 0.6–2.1 mm (0.024–0.083 in) wide and keeled. Flowering has been observed throughout the year, and the fruit is a slightly flattened oval capsule 6.5–7.0 mm (0.26–0.28 in) long and 3.5–4.5 mm (0.14–0.18 in) wide.

== Taxonomy ==
Stachystemon vermicularis was first formally described in 1845 by Jules Émile Planchon in the London Journal of Botany from specimens collected near the Swan River by James Drummond. The species epithet, (vermicularis) means "worm-shaped", referring to the male flowers.

== Distribution and habitat ==
This species grows on undulating country in open forest or woodland between Eneabba and Collie in the Jarrah Forest and Swan Coastal Plain bioregions of south-western Western Australia.
