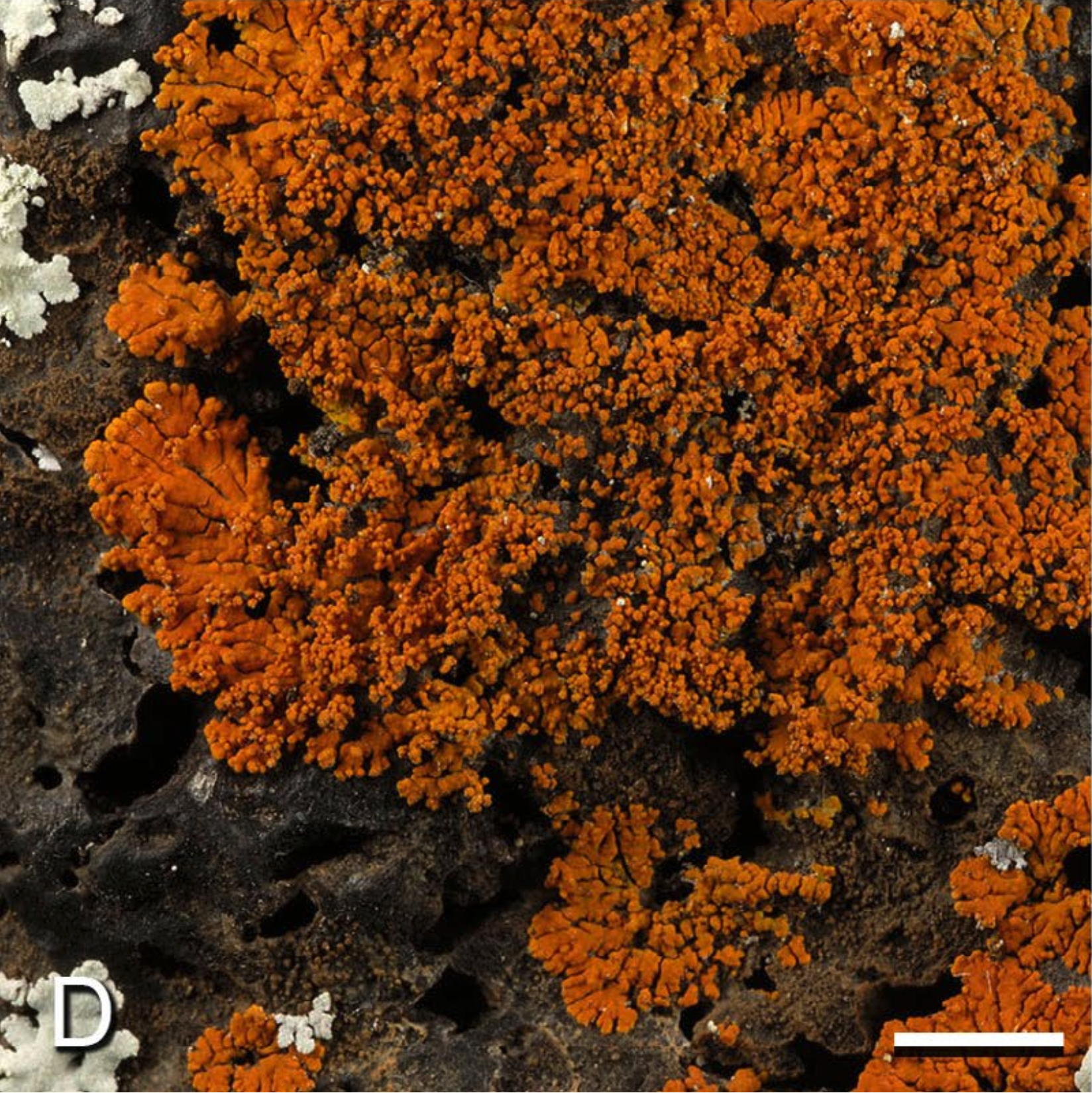
- scale bar: 2 mm

Scientific classification
- Kingdom: Fungi
- Division: Ascomycota
- Class: Lecanoromycetes
- Order: Teloschistales
- Family: Teloschistaceae
- Genus: Oceanoplaca
- Species: O. isidiosa

Binomial name
- Oceanoplaca isidiosa (Vain.) Bungartz, Søchting & Arup (2020)

Synonyms
- Placodium isidiosum Vain. (1890); Caloplaca isidiosa (Vain.) Zahlbr. (1931)

= Oceanoplaca isidiosa =

Species of lichen-forming fungus

Oceanoplaca isidiosa is a species of lichen-forming fungus in the family Teloschistaceae. It forms bright yellow-orange to reddish-orange rosettes on rocks, particularly in coastal areas, and is known from Brazil and the Galápagos Islands. Originally described from granite along the Brazilian seashore in 1890, the species was transferred to the newly established genus Oceanoplaca in 2020 based on DNA studies, where it serves as the type species. The lichen reproduces primarily through small breakaway outgrowths (isidia) and produces the rare pigment isidiosin, which was named after this species.

== Taxonomy ==
Oceanoplaca isidiosa was originally described from granite rock on the seashore near Rio de Janeiro, Brazil, in 1890 by Edvard Vainio as Placodium isidiosum, based on an orange, tightly attached thallus with radiating marginal lobes and short isidia. Alexander Zahlbruckner transferred the species to Caloplaca in 1931.

In a phylogenetic revision of Galápagos Teloschistaceae, Frank Bungartz, Ulrik Søchting, and Ulf Arup transferred the species to the newly described genus Oceanoplaca (where it serves as the type species). In that treatment, Oceanoplaca is placed in the subfamily Caloplacoideae and is recovered as sister to Phaeoplaca, which was later renamed to Obscuroplaca.

Within the Galápagos, the species is morphologically variable, and some pale, whitish-pruinose forms were once suspected to represent a separate taxon; DNA data did not support splitting them. Weber had annotated some pruinose collections as "Caloplaca saxicola", but that name was never formally published and is treated as part of O. isidiosa.

== Description ==
The thallus of O. isidiosa is placodioid (a crust that forms a rosette with a lobed edge). It consists of convex, elongated to radiating areoles in the center and broader, fan-shaped lobes around the margin. Individual rosettes reach about 2.5 cm across, and neighboring thalli often merge. The surface is usually strong yellow-orange to deep reddish orange, sometimes with a faint orange dusting and only rarely a pale whitish pruina.

Vegetative reproduction is typically prominent: the thallus (especially toward the center) is densely covered with isidia—tiny outgrowths that can break off and start new thalli. These begin as small papillae or nodules and soon become broadly cylindrical to coarsely coralloid, about 0.1–0.2 mm thick. Apothecia (fruiting bodies) are often absent or poorly developed when the thallus is heavily isidiate. When present, they are typically 0.6–0.8 mm wide, lecanorine in form, and orange, with the disc initially concave and later flatter. Spores are produced eight per ascus and are polarilocular (two-celled with a thickened internal wall), typically 9.2–11.6 × 5.4–7.6 μm, occasionally ranging to 8.3–13.1 × 4.6–9.2 μm. Pycnidia have not been observed.

Chemically, both thallus and apothecia react K+ purple (a standard spot test), consistent with anthraquinone pigments. The species produces abundant quantities of the anthraquinone isidiosin; the compound was named after O. isidiosa, and its chemical structure has not yet been fully resolved.

== Habitat and distribution ==
Oceanoplaca isidiosa was described from Brazil and is also known from the Galápagos Islands of Ecuador, where it was first reported in the literature in 1986. In the Galápagos it is primarily saxicolous, forming bright rosettes on rock in open sites.

It most often occurs on sunny, wind- and rain-exposed rock surfaces, and is less frequent in sheltered, semi-shaded habitats (especially close to the coast). On the islands it is recorded mainly from the coastal zone through the dry and lower transition zones, and only rarely extends into the humid zone.
