= Stachystemon nematophorus =

Conservation status
- Priority Four — Rare Taxa (DEC)

Scientific classification
- Kingdom: Plantae
- Clade: Tracheophytes
- Clade: Angiosperms
- Clade: Eudicots
- Clade: Rosids
- Order: Malpighiales
- Family: Picrodendraceae
- Genus: Stachystemon
- Species: S. nematophorus

Binomial name
- Stachystemon nematophorus (F.Muell.) Halford & R.J.F.Hend.

Synonyms
- Pseudanthus nematophorus F.Muell.

Species of shrub

Stachystemon nematophorus is a species of flowering plant in the family Picrodendraceae and is endemic to the Kalbarri National Park in Western Australia. It is a woody, dense, compact, monoecious shrub with simple, oblong, elliptic or egg-shaped leaves with the narrower end towards the base, and small yellowish flowers arranged singly in upper leaf axils, forming clusters at the ends of branches.

== Description ==
Stachystemon nematophorus is a woody, dense, compact, monoecious shrub that typically grows to a height of up to 10 cm (3.9 in) and has glabrous branchlets. Its leaves are arranged in opposite pairs, evenly spaced along the branchlets and glabrous. The leaves are oblong, elliptic or egg-shaped with the narrower end towards the base, 4–15 mm (0.16–0.59 in) long and 0.9–1.5 mm (0.035–0.059 in) wide on a petiole 0.6–0.8 mm (0.024–0.031 in), with pale brown, narrowly triangular stipules 0.7–1.2 mm (0.028–0.047 in) long at the base. Both sides of the leaves are more or less glabrous. The flowers are arranged singly in upper leaf axils forming clusters on the ends of branches with reddish brown, bract-like leaves and two bracteoles at the base. Male flowers are more or less sessile with six dissimilar yellowish tepals, the outer three 0.5–0.9 mm (0.020–0.035 in) long and 0.6–0.8 mm (0.024–0.031 in) wide, two of the inner three slightly shorter and one much longer and thread-like. There are 12 to 16 stamens, the anthers purplish red or brown. Female flowers are sessile and have 6 tepals 0.6–1.2 mm (0.024–0.047 in) long, 0.2–1.5 mm (0.0079–0.0591 in) wide and keeled. Flowering has been observed in May, and the fruit is an oval capsule 5–7 mm (0.20–0.28 in) long and 2–3 mm (0.079–0.118 in) in diameter.

== Taxonomy and naming ==
This species was first formally described in 1860 by Ferdinand von Mueller, who gave it the name Pseudanthus nematophorus in Fragmenta Phytographiae Australiae from specimens collected near the Murchison River by Augustus Oldfield. In 2003, David Halford and Rodney Francis transferred the species to Stachystemon as S. nematophorus in the journal Austrobaileya. The specific epithet (nematophorus) means "bearing a thread", referring to one of the male tepals that is longer than the others and thread-like.

== Distribution and habitat ==
This stachystemon grows in rock crevices in shrubland in Kalbarri National Park in the Geraldton Sandplains bioregion of south-western Western Australia.

== Conservation status ==
Stachystemon nematophorus is classified as "Priority Four" by the Government of Western Australia Department of Biodiversity, Conservation and Attractions, meaning that it is rare or near threatened.
