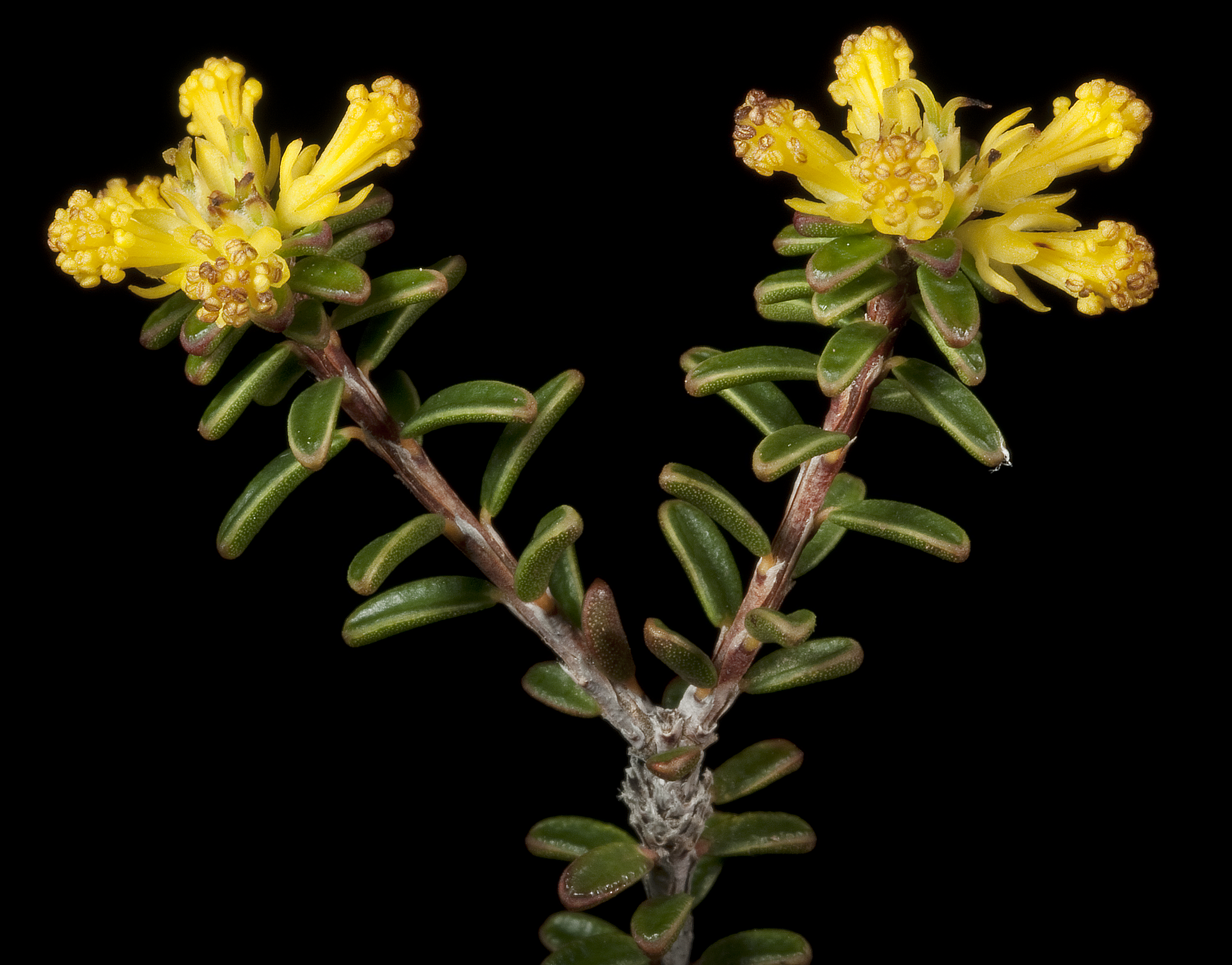
- Stachystemon polyandrus

Scientific classification
- Kingdom: Plantae
- Clade: Tracheophytes
- Clade: Angiosperms
- Clade: Eudicots
- Clade: Rosids
- Order: Malpighiales
- Family: Picrodendraceae
- Genus: Stachystemon; Planch.

Synonyms
- Chorizotheca Müll.Arg.; Chrysostemon Klotzsch; Pseudanthus sect. Caletiopsis Müll.Arg.; Pseudanthus sect. Chrysostemon (Klotzsch) Müll.Arg.

= Stachystemon =

Genus of nine species of flowering plants

Stachystemon is a genus of nine species of flowering plants in the family Picrodendraceae, and is endemic to Western Australia. Plants in the genus Stachystemon are monoecious shrubs with simple, usually thickened leaves, and flowers arranged singly or in small groups in upper leaf axils, male flowers usually with four to six tepals (sepals and petals together), usually with seven to many stamens, and female flowers with four or six tepals and two styles in each flower.

== Description ==
Plants in the genus Stachystemon are monoecious shrubs with simple, usually thickened, petiolate leaves with stipules at the base. The flowers are arranged singly or in small groups in upper leaf axils, often forming clusters on the ends of branchlets with bracts at the base. Male flowers are usually arranged on a pedicel, and usually have four to six tepals in two whorls, each male flower with seven to many stamens fused in a central column. Female flowers are more or less sessile, usually with four or six tepals, each flower with two styles. The fruit is a capsule containing a single seed with a caruncle.

== Taxonomy ==
The genus Stachystemon was first formally described in 1845 by Jules Émile Planchon in the London Journal of Botany, and the first species he described (the type species) was Stachystemon vermicularis. The genus name (Stachystemon) is derived from Greek words meaning "ear of corn" or "spike", and "thread", referring to the joined stamens.

=== Species list ===
The following is a list of species of Stachystemon accepted by the Australian Plant Census as of September 2023:

- Stachystemon axillaris A.S.George
- Stachystemon brachyphyllus Müll.Arg.
- Stachystemon intricatus Halford & R.J.F.Hend.
- Stachystemon mucronatus Halford & R.J.F.Hend.
- Stachystemon nematophorus (F.Muell.) Halford & R.J.F.Hend.
- Stachystemon polyandrus (F.Muell.) Benth.
- Stachystemon vermicularis Planch.
- Stachystemon vinosus Halford & R.J.F.Hend.
- Stachystemon virgatus (Klotzsch) Halford & R.J.F.Hend.

== Distribution ==
All species of Stachystemon are endemic to the south-west of Western Australia.

== See also ==
- Taxonomy of the Picrodendraceae
