= International Code of Nomenclature for algae, fungi, and plants =

Code of scientific nomenclature

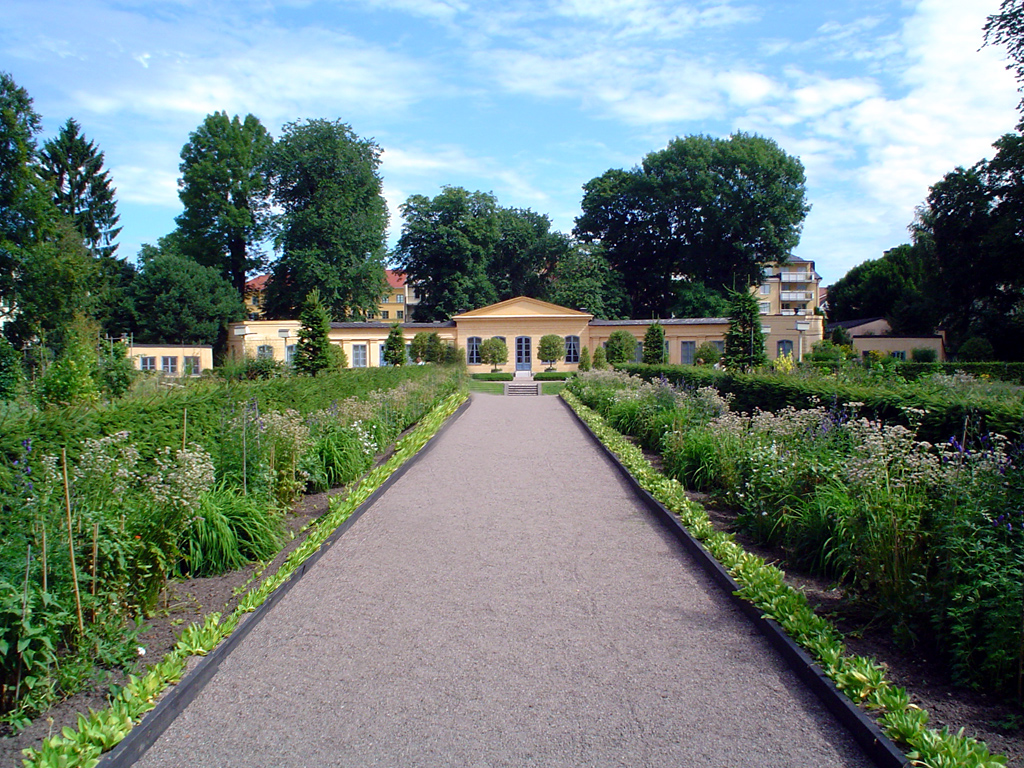
Carl Linnaeus's garden at Uppsala, Sweden.

The International Code of Nomenclature for algae, fungi, and plants (ICN or ICNafp) is the set of rules and recommendations dealing with the formal botanical names that are given to plants, fungi and a few other groups of organisms, all those "traditionally treated as algae, fungi, or plants". It was formerly called the International Code of Botanical Nomenclature (ICBN); the name was changed at the International Botanical Congress in Melbourne in July 2011 as part of the Melbourne Code which replaced the Vienna Code of 2005.

The ICN can only be changed by an International Botanical Congress (IBC), with the International Association for Plant Taxonomy providing the supporting infrastructure. Each new edition supersedes the earlier editions and is retroactive back to 1753, except where different starting dates are specified.

The 17th edition, the Shenzhen Code, was adopted by the IBC held in Shenzhen, China, in July 2017. As with previous codes, it took effect as soon as it was ratified by the congress (on 29 July 2017), but the documentation was not published until 26 June 2018. For fungi the Code was revised by the San Juan Chapter F in 2018.

The 18th edition, the Madrid Code, was published in July 2025. It incorporates decisions made by the Twentieth IBC held in Madrid, Spain, in July 2024.

The name of the Code is partly capitalized and partly not. The lower-case for "algae, fungi, and plants" indicates that these terms are not formal names of clades, but indicate groups of organisms that were historically known by these names and traditionally studied by phycologists, mycologists, and botanists. This includes blue-green algae (Cyanobacteria); fungi, including chytrids, oomycetes, and slime moulds; photosynthetic protists and taxonomically related non-photosynthetic groups. There are special provisions in the ICN for some of these groups, as there are for fossils.

For the naming of cultivated plants there is a separate code, the International Code of Nomenclature for Cultivated Plants, which gives rules and recommendations that supplement the ICN.

== Principles ==
- Botanical nomenclature is independent of zoological, bacteriological, and viral nomenclature (see Nomenclature codes).
- A botanical name is fixed to a taxon by a type. This is almost invariably dried plant material and is usually deposited and preserved in a herbarium, although it may also be an image or a preserved culture. Some type collections can be viewed online at the websites of the herbaria in question.
- A guiding principle in botanical nomenclature is priority, the first publication of a name for a taxon. The formal starting date for purposes of priority is 1 May 1753, the publication of Species Plantarum by Linnaeus. However, to avoid undesirable (destabilizing) effects of strict enforcement of priority, conservation of family, genus, and species names is possible.
- The intent of the Code is that each taxonomic group ("taxon", plural "taxa") of plants has only one correct name that is accepted worldwide, provided that it has the same circumscription, position and rank. The value of a scientific name is that it is an identifier; it is not necessarily of descriptive value.
- Names of taxa are treated as Latin.
- The rules of nomenclature are retroactive unless there is an explicit statement that this does not apply.

== History ==
The rules governing botanical nomenclature have a long and tumultuous history, dating back to dissatisfaction with rules that were established in 1843 to govern zoological nomenclature. The first set of international rules was the Lois de la nomenclature botanique ("Laws of botanical nomenclature") that was adopted as the "best guide to follow for botanical nomenclature" at an "International Botanical Congress" convened in Paris in 1867. Unlike modern Codes, it contained recommendations for naming to serve as the basis for discussions on the controversial points of nomenclature, rather than obligatory rules for validly published and legitimate names within the Code. It was organized as six sections with 68 articles in total.

Multiple attempts to bring more "expedient" or more equitable practice to botanical nomenclature resulted in several competing codes, which finally reached a compromise with the 1930 congress. In the meantime, the second edition of the international rules followed the Vienna congress in 1905. These rules were published as the Règles internationales de la Nomenclature botanique adoptées par le Congrès International de Botanique de Vienne 1905 (or in English, International rules of Botanical Nomenclature adopted by the International Botanical Conference of Vienna 1905). Informally they are referred to as the Vienna Rules (not to be confused with the Vienna Code of 2006).

Some but not all subsequent meetings of the International Botanical Congress have produced revised versions of these Rules, later called the International Code of Botanical Nomenclature, and then International Code of Nomenclature for algae, fungi, and plants.

The Nomenclature Section of the 18th International Botanical Congress in Melbourne, Australia (2011) made major changes:

- The Code now permits electronic-only publication of names of new taxa; no longer will it be a requirement to deposit some paper copies in libraries.
- The requirement for a Latin validating diagnosis or description was changed to allow either English or Latin for these essential components of the publication of a new name (Article 39).
- "One fungus, one name" and "one fossil, one name" are important changes; the concepts of anamorph and teleomorph (for fungi) and morphotaxa (for fossils) have been eliminated.
- As an experiment with "registration of names", new fungal descriptions require the use of an identifier from "a recognized repository"; there are three recognized repositories, Index Fungorum, MycoBank, and Fungal Names.

== Versions ==
All the versions are listed below.

Year of publication	Informal name
1867	Laws of botanical nomenclature
1883	Laws of botanical nomenclature, ed. 2
1906	Vienna Rules
1912	Brussels Rules
1935	Cambridge Rules
1950	Amsterdam Code
1952	Stockholm Code
1956	Paris Code
1961	Montreal Code
1966	Edinburgh Code
1972	Seattle Code
1978	Leningrad Code
1983	Sydney Code
1988	Berlin Code
1994	Tokyo Code
2000	St Louis Code
2006	Vienna Code
2012	Melbourne Code
2018	Shenzhen Code
2025	Madrid Code (current)

== See also ==
Specific to botany

- Author citation (botany)
- Botanical name
- Botanical nomenclature
  - International Association for Plant Taxonomy
  - International Code of Nomenclature for Cultivated Plants
  - International Plant Names Index
- Correct name (botany)
- Infraspecific name (botany)
- Hybrid name (botany)

More general

- Glossary of scientific naming
- Binomial nomenclature
- Nomenclature codes
- Scientific classification
- Undescribed species

Zoological codification

- International Code of Zoological Nomenclature (ICZN)
