= Stachystemon vinosus =

Conservation status
- Priority Four — Rare Taxa (DEC)

Scientific classification
- Kingdom: Plantae
- Clade: Tracheophytes
- Clade: Angiosperms
- Clade: Eudicots
- Clade: Rosids
- Order: Malpighiales
- Family: Picrodendraceae
- Genus: Stachystemon
- Species: S. vinosus

Binomial name
- Stachystemon vinosus Halford & R.J.F.Hend.

Species of plant

Stachystemon vinosus is a species of flowering plant in the family Picrodendraceae and is endemic to the southwest of Western Australia. It is a compact, monoecious shrub with narrowly egg-shaped or narrowly oblong leaves and maroon to purplish red and white male flowers and white female flowers arranged singly in upper leaf axils, but forming clusters at the ends of branches.

== Description ==
Stachystemon vinosus is a compact, monoecious shrub that typically grows to a height of up to 10 cm (3.9 in) and has smooth, glabrous branchlets. Its leaves are well-spaced along the stems and branchlets, narrowly egg-shaped or narrowly oblong, 6–10 mm (0.24–0.39 in) long and 1.5–2.0 mm (0.059–0.079 in) wide on a petiole 0.5–0.9 mm (0.020–0.035 in), with reddish-brown, narrowly triangular stipules 0.8–1.5 mm (0.031–0.059 in) long at the base. Both sides of the leaves are more or less glabrous, but the edges of the leaves are pimply. The flowers are arranged singly in upper leaf axils forming clusters on the ends of branches with reddish brown, triangular bracts about 1.0 mm (0.039 in) long and one or two similar, but smaller bracteoles at the base. Male flowers are on a stout pedicel about 0.5 mm (0.020 in) long with 6 dissimilar tepals in two whorls, the inner whorl purplish-red 6.5–7.0 mm (0.26–0.28 in) long and 1.0–1.5 mm (0.039–0.059 in) wide, the outer whorl 2.5–3.0 mm (0.098–0.118 in) and 1.5–2 mm (0.059–0.079 in) wide. There are 26 to 40 stamens, the anthers dark purplish-red. Female flowers are sessile and usually have 6 white, narrowly egg-shaped tepals 1.5–2.4 mm (0.059–0.094 in) long and 0.4–0.7 mm (0.016–0.028 in) wide. Flowering has been observed from September to November, and the fruit is a compressed oval capsule about 6.5 mm (0.26 in) long.

== Taxonomy ==
Stachystemon vinosus was first formally described in 2003 by David Halford and Rodney Henderson in the journal Austrobaileya from specimens collected near the mouth of the Oldfield River in 1968. The specific epithet (vinosus) means "wine-coloured" or "purplish-red", referring to the colours of the male flowers.

== Distribution and habitat ==
This species grows on fine, loamy sand or stony soils on sandplains, rock crevices and breakaways along the south coast of Western Australia, from near the Oldfield River to Cape Arid National Park in the Esperance Plains and Mallee bioregions of south-western Western Australia.
