= Lecanora subloekoesii =

Scientific classification
- Domain: Eukaryota
- Kingdom: Fungi
- Division: Ascomycota
- Class: Lecanoromycetes
- Order: Lecanorales
- Family: Lecanoraceae
- Genus: Lecanora
- Species: L. subloekoesii

Binomial name
- Lecanora subloekoesii Z.T.Zhao & L.Lü (2017)

Species of lichen

Lecanora subloekoesii is a species of crustose lichen in the family Lecanoraceae. Found in China, it was described as new to science in 2017 by Zun-Tian Zhao and Lei Lü. The type collection, found growing on bark, was made on Mount Datudingzi (Heilongjiang Province) at an elevation of 1,200 metres (3,900 ft). It has also been collected in mountainous areas of Jilin, Liaoning, and Shanxi Provinces. The epithet subloekoesii refers to its close appearance to Lecanora loekoesii.

== See also ==
- List of Lecanora species
