= Stachystemon intricatus =

Scientific classification
- Kingdom: Plantae
- Clade: Tracheophytes
- Clade: Angiosperms
- Clade: Eudicots
- Clade: Rosids
- Order: Malpighiales
- Family: Picrodendraceae
- Genus: Stachystemon
- Species: S. intricatus

Binomial name
- Stachystemon intricatus Halford & R.J.F.Hend.

Species of shrub

Stachystemon intricatus is a species of flowering plant in the family Picrodendraceae and is endemic to the south-west of Western Australia. It is a compact, densely-branched, monoecious shrub with crowded, elliptic or egg-shaped leaves and small, cup-shaped white flowers arranged singly in upper leaf axils.

== Description ==
Stachystemon intricatus is a compact, densely-branched, monoecious shrub that typically grows to a height of up to 30 cm (12 in). It has more or less erect stems and smooth, glabrous branchlets. Its leaves are crowded near the ends of branchlets, egg-shaped with the narrower end towards the base, or elliptic, 1.4–2.5 mm (0.055–0.098 in) long and 0.6–1.5 mm (0.024–0.059 in) wide on a petiole 0.3–0.5 mm (0.012–0.020 in) long with reddish brown, narrowly triangular stipules 0.6–0.8 mm (0.024–0.031 in) long at the base. Both sides of the leaves are more or less glabrous. The flowers are arranged singly in upper leaf axils forming clusters on the ends of branches with reddish brown bracts 0.6–0.8 mm (0.024–0.031 in) long at the base. Male flowers are sessile or on a stout pedicel 0.5–0.6 mm (0.020–0.024 in) long, usually with six cup-shaped tepals in two whorls, the inner ones 2.1–4 mm (0.083–0.157 in) long the outer three 1.3–1.4 mm (0.051–0.055 in) long and there are 23 to 27 stamens. Female flowers usually have six white tepals in two whorls, the outer three 1.3–1.7 mm (0.051–0.067 in) long and the inner ones shorter. Flowering occurs from July to October, and the fruit is a smooth, oblong capsule 6–7 mm (0.24–0.28 in) long and 2.5–2.7 mm (0.098–0.106 in) wide.

== Taxonomy and naming ==
Stachystemon intricatus was first formally described in 2003 by David Halford and Rodney Henderson in the journal Austrobaileya from specimens collected near Paynes Find in 1969. The specific epithet (intricatus) means "entangled", referring to the branching habit of this species.

== Distribution and habitat ==
This stachystemon grows in shrubland roughly in the area bounded by Hamelin Pool, Meekatharra and Paynes Find in the Avon Wheatbelt, Carnarvon, Murchison and Yalgoo bioregions of south-western Western Australia.
