= MycoBank =

Online database for fungi

Content
- Description: mycological names and combinations, eventually combined with descriptions and illustrations

Contact
- Research center: Westerdijk Fungal Biodiversity Institute

Access
- Website: www.mycobank.org

MycoBank is an online database, documenting new mycological names and combinations, eventually combined with descriptions and illustrations. It is run by the Westerdijk Fungal Biodiversity Institute in Utrecht.

Each novelty, after being screened by nomenclatural experts and found in accordance with the ICN (International Code of Nomenclature for algae, fungi, and plants), is allocated a unique MycoBank number before the new name has been validly published. This number then can be cited by the naming author in the publication where the new name is being introduced. Only then, this unique number becomes public in the database.

By doing so, this system can help solve the problem of knowing which names have been validly published and in which year.

MycoBank is linked to other important mycological databases such as Index Fungorum, Life Science Identifiers, Global Biodiversity Information Facility (GBIF) and other databases. MycoBank is one of three nomenclatural repositories recognized by the Nomenclature Committee for Fungi; the others are Index Fungorum and Fungal Names.

MycoBank has emerged as the primary registration system for new fungal taxa and nomenclatural acts. According to a 2021 analysis of taxonomic innovations in lichen and allied fungi between 2018–2020, 97.7% of newly described taxa and 76.5% of new combinations obtained their registration numbers from MycoBank, suggesting broad adoption by the mycological community. The system serves as a critical infrastructure for tracking valid publication of new fungal names, though it operates alongside other repositories like Index Fungorum and Fungal Names. While MycoBank is widely used for obtaining registration identifiers as required by the International Code of Nomenclature for fungi since 2013, it maintains a complementary role to Index Fungorum, which continues to serve as a commonly used system for querying general nomenclatural information about fungal names. Registration numbers must be obtained after manuscript acceptance but before publication for new names to be considered validly published.
