= László Sándor Lőkös =

Hungarian lichenologist

- Born: 18 June 1959 (age 66); Siófok
- Education: Lovassy László Grammar School
- Alma mater: University of Pécs
- Spouse: Edit Éva Farkas
- Scientific career
- Fields: Lichenology
- Institutions: Hungarian Natural History Museum
- Thesis: Taxonomic revision on the Hungarian Bacidia s. l. taxa (A Bacidia s. l. zuzmónemzetség hazai fajainak taxonómiai revíziója) (2005)
- Doctoral advisors: Edit Éva Farkas
- Author abbrev. (botany): Lőkös

László Sándor Lőkös is a Hungarian lichenologist and former curator of the lichen collection of the Hungarian Natural History Museum in Budapest.

== Education and personal life ==
He studied at Eötvös Loránd University public research university in Budapest, gaining a master's degree in 1983 with his thesis titled Atomic absorption analysis of heavy metal contents of lichens transplanted in Budapest supervised by Klára Verseghy. He was awarded his doctorate in 2005 by University of Pécs.

He is married to Edit Éva Farkas, who is also a lichenologist. They have two children together.

== Research career ==
He worked in the botany department of the University of Veterinary Science, Budapest, for two years (1983–1985). For most of his career, he has been curator of the lichen collection in the Botanical Department of the Hungarian Natural History Museum, Budapest, after the retirement of Klára Verseghy. After attending and presenting work at the 14th International Botanical Congress (Berlin, 1987), he was inspired to follow a career in lichenology and met international lichenologists who later became collaborators. In 1992 he accompanied Farkas on a year-long visit to the Natural History Museum, London, collaborating with David J. Galloway and others.

He has predominantly studied lichen distribution in Hungary, but also undertook field visits to the Balkan Peninsular, Romania and South Korea, among other places, that also considered effects of the environment on lichens. He has undertaken a very substantial amount of fieldwork in Hungary as well as taxonomic studies. The Bacidia s. l. group became his specialist area, but he also investigated other genera and lichenicolous fungi. In 1997 he collaborated in the production of the first red list for lichens in Hungary that resulted in legal protection for 5 species in 2005 and later 12 more. He has added many specimens to the Hungarian Natural History Museum's lichen collection. Together with Farkas, they have characterised 17 new genera and 139 new taxa, and proposed more than 120 new nomenclature combinations. This includes 50 species new to Hungary. Lőkös has also undertaken substantial roles in editing Hungarian books and scientific journals.

== Scientific publications ==
Lőkös is the author or co-author of at least 100 scientific publications. The most significant include:

- Juan Carlos Zamora, Måns Svensson, Roland Kirschner, Ibai Olariaga ... László Lőkös ... and others (2018) Considerations and consequences of allowing DNA sequence data as types of fungal taxa. IMA fungus 9 (1) 167–175.
- E Farkas, L Lőkös and K Verseghy (1985) Lichens as indicators of air pollution in the Budapest agglomeration. I. Air pollution map based on floristic data and heavy metal concentration measurements Acta Botanica Hungarica

== Awards ==
In 2016 he was awarded the Boros Ádám Award jointly with Farkas for their contribution to mapping and identification methods of lichens in Hungary, as well as teaching younger scientists. Two genera, Loekoesia and Loekoeslaszloa have been named after him.

== See also ==
- Category:Taxa named by László Sándor Lőkös
