= Correct name =

Only scientific name to be used (from a particular scientific point of view)

In botany, the correct name according to the International Code of Nomenclature for algae, fungi, and plants (ICN) is the only botanical name that is to be used for a particular taxon, when that taxon has a particular circumscription, position and rank. Determining whether a name is correct is a complex procedure. The name must be validly published, a process which is defined in no less than 16 Articles of the ICN. It must also be "legitimate", which imposes some further requirements. If there are two or more legitimate names for the same taxon (with the same circumscription, position and rank), then the correct name is the one which has priority, i.e. it was published earliest, although names may be conserved if they have been very widely used. Validly published names other than the correct name are called synonyms. Since taxonomists may disagree as to the circumscription, position or rank of a taxon, there can be more than one correct name for a particular plant. These may also be called synonyms.

The correct name has only one correct spelling, which will generally be the original spelling (although certain limited corrections are allowed). Other spellings are called orthographical variants.

The zoological equivalent of "correct name" is "valid name".

== Example ==
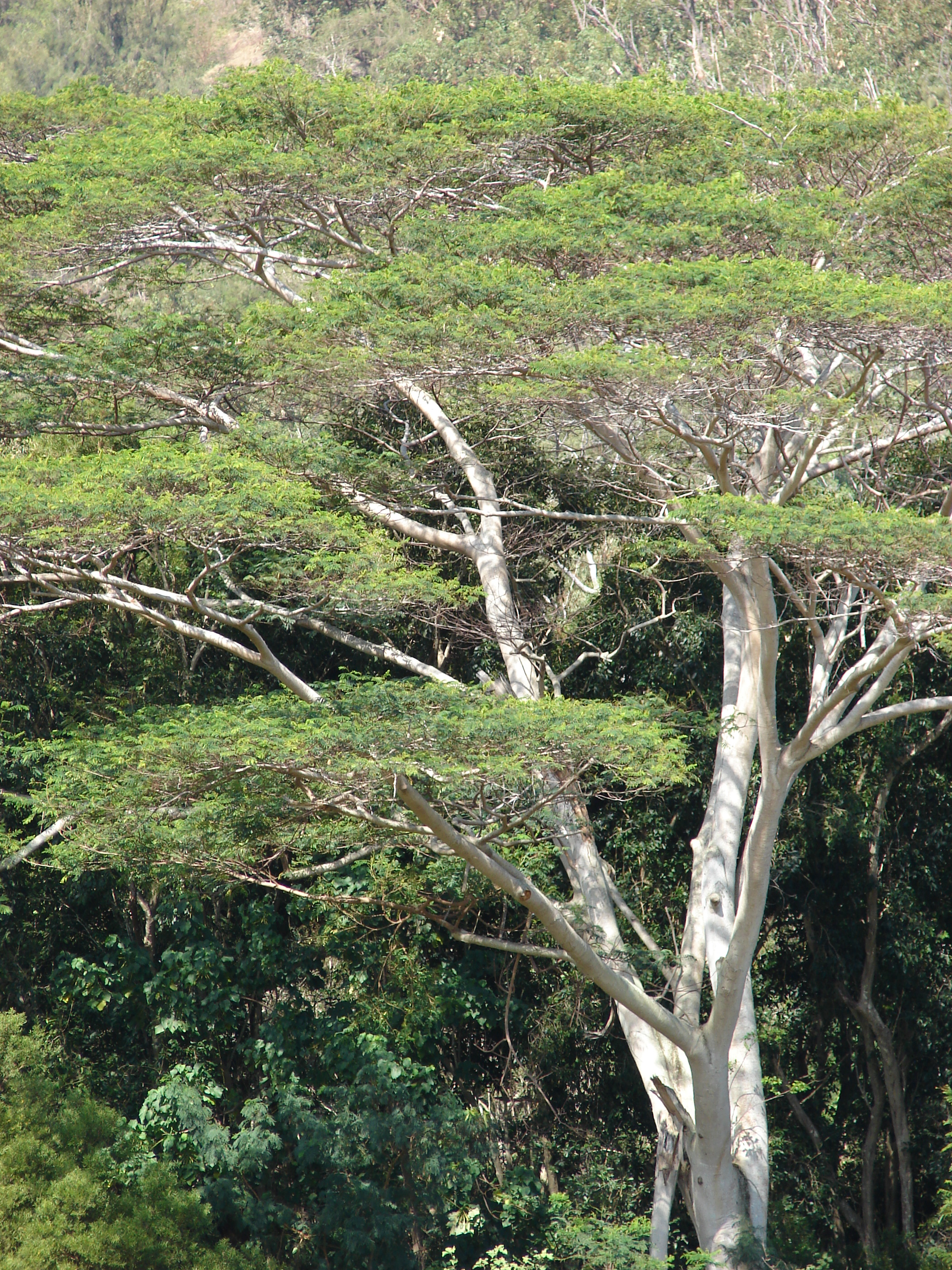
Linnaeus' Adenanthera falcataria has many other names.

Different taxonomic placements may well lead to different correct names. For example, the earliest name for the fastest growing tree in the world is Adenanthera falcataria L. The "L." stands for "Linnaeus" who first validly published the name. Adenanthera falcataria is thus one of the correct names for this plant. There are other correct names, based on different taxonomic treatments.

- It can be placed in the genus Albizia, as Fosberg first did. When placed in this genus, the first choice of correct name is the new genus name followed by the earlier species epithet, giving Albizia falcataria. This name cannot be used if there is already a species in the genus with this epithet, so that an illegitimate duplicate would be created. As this is not the case, the correct name for the plant in this genus is Albizia falcataria (L.) Fosberg. "Fosberg" is the authority for the transfer to the new genus; "L(innaeus)" the authority for the 'base name' (basionym) from which the new name is derived.
- It can also be placed in the genus Paraserianthes. Its correct name in that position is Paraserianthes falcataria (L.) I.C.Nielsen.
- Within the genus Paraserianthes, it is placed in section Falcataria. If the section is raised in rank to become the genus Falcataria, the correct name cannot be Falcataria falcataria, as might be expected, since under the botanical code (but not the zoological code) names with the same word as both the genus and the specific epithet (tautonyms) are forbidden. An alternative basionym must be sought or a new name created. The correct name is Falcataria falcata (L.) Greuter & R.Rankin.

The four names Adenanthera falcataria, Albizia falcataria, Paraserianthes falcataria and Falcataria falcata can each be correct given different taxonomic opinions that put the plant in each of these four genera. Which is the 'right' genus is a problem for taxonomy, not nomenclature. Thus this tree species will have a different correct botanical name for different people. Different taxonomists may publish revisions or monographs picking a different accepted name dependent on their own circumscription of this taxon, for which the other correct names become (homotypic) synonyms; note however that there is only one correct name for a given circumscription.

== Prokaryotes ==
The Prokaryotic Code inherits many concepts, including that of a "correct name", from the ICN. As with the botanical concept, different taxonomists may have different concepts of a genus, leading to different "correct names". The List of Prokaryotic names with Standing in Nomenclature (LPSN) tries to be consistent with its approach to selecting correct names. The LPSN notes that although later combinations tend to be based on better phylogenomic data, just taking "the last valid combination" is not sufficient because of possible inconsistencies in concepts.

== See also ==
(specific to botany)

- Botanical name
- Botanical nomenclature
- International Code of Nomenclature for algae, fungi, and plants
  - International Code of Nomenclature for Cultivated Plants
  - International Plant Names Index
  - International Association for Plant Taxonomy
- Author citation (botany)

(more general)

- Scientific classification
- Binomial nomenclature
- Hybrid name (botany)
- Nomenclature Codes
- International Code of Zoological Nomenclature

== Bibliography ==
- Barkworth, M. (2004), Botanical Nomenclature (Nomenclature, Names, and Taxonomy), University of Utah, archived from the original on 2011-07-20
- McNeill, J.; Barrie, F.R.; Buck, W.R.; Demoulin, V.; Greuter, W.; Hawksworth, D.L.; Herendeen, P.S.; Knapp, S.; Marhold, K.; Prado, J.; Prud'homme van Reine, W.F.; Smith, G.F.; Wiersema, J.H. & Turland, N.J., eds. (2012), International Code of Nomenclature for algae, fungi, and plants (Melbourne Code) adopted by the Eighteenth International Botanical Congress Melbourne, Australia, July 2011, vol. Regnum Vegetabile 154, A.R.G. Gantner Verlag KG, ISBN 978-3-87429-425-6
- Barrie, F. R.; Greuter, W.; Hawksworth, D. L.; Herendeen, P. S.; Knapp, S.; Kusber, W.-H.; Li, D.-Z.; Marhold, K.; May, T. W.; McNeill, J.; Monro, A. M.; Prado, J.; Price, M. J. & Smith, G. F., eds. (2018), International Code of Nomenclature for algae, fungi, and plants (Shenzhen Code) adopted by the Nineteenth International Botanical Congress Shenzhen, China, July 2017, vol. Regnum Vegetabile 159, Koeltz Botanical Books, doi:10.12705/Code.2018, hdl:10141/622572
