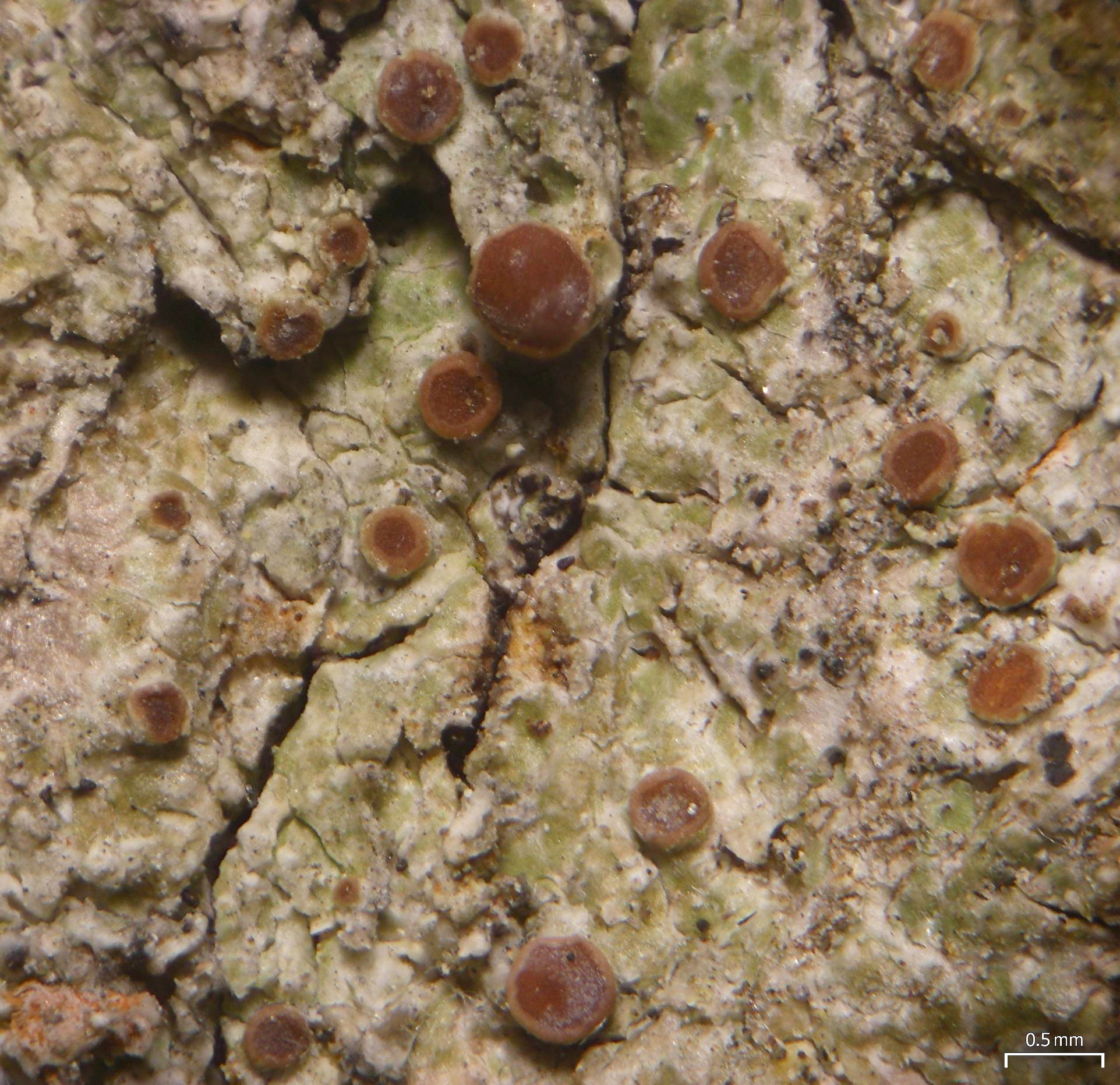
- Obscuroplaca camptidia growing on oak in Delmarva, Virginia

Scientific classification
- Domain: Eukaryota
- Kingdom: Fungi
- Division: Ascomycota
- Class: Lecanoromycetes
- Order: Teloschistales
- Family: Teloschistaceae
- Genus: Obscuroplaca; Søchting, Arup & Bungartz (2021)

Type species
- Obscuroplaca camptidia (Tuck.) Søchting, Arup & Bungartz (2021)

Species
- O. camptidia O. ochrolechioides O. tortuca

Synonyms
- Phaeoplaca Søchting, Arup & Bungartz (2020)

= Obscuroplaca =

Genus of lichen-forming fungi

Obscuroplaca is a genus of lichen-forming fungi in the family Teloschistaceae. It contains three species of corticolous (bark-dwelling), crustose lichens.

== Taxonomy ==
The genus, published in 2021 by lichenologists Ulrik Søchting, Ulf Arup, and Frank Bungartz, is a replacement for Phaeoplaca, an illegitimate name circumscribed by the same authors the previous year. The genus name combines the Latin obscuro ("dark", alluding to the dull colour of the thallus, which lacks the bright anthraquinones typical of other Teloschistaceae members), with placa, a reference to Caloplaca, the genus from which the species were originally transferred.

Obscuroplaca occupies a distinct and well-defined clade within the subfamily Caloplacoideae of the family Teloschistaceae.

== Description ==
The thallus of Obscuroplaca species grows on tree bark, and is characterized by its crustose form and a surface marked by cracks and fissures. When it comes to reproduction, this lichen develops biatorine apothecia, which are typically brown in colour. Inside these apothecia are clavate-shaped asci of the Teloschistes type, each containing eight spores. These ascospores have a polaribilocular structure with a wide septum.

== Species ==
Obscuroplaca species occur in Australia, the Galápagos Islands, Mexico, and the southeastern USA.

- Obscuroplaca camptidia (Tuck.) Søchting, Arup & Bungartz (2021)
- Obscuroplaca ochrolechioides (S.Y.Kondr. & Kärnefelt) Søchting & Bungartz (2021)
- Obscuroplaca tortuca (Søchting & Bungartz) Søchting & Bungartz (2021)
