= Index Kewensis =

Register of botanical names of all seed plants, maintained by Kew Gardens

The 1893 Index Kewensis (IK), maintained by the Royal Botanic Gardens, Kew, is a publication that aims to register all botanical names for seed plants at the rank of species and genera. It later came to include names of taxonomic families and ranks below that of species.

The Index is currently maintained as part of the International Plant Names Index in combination with the Gray Herbarium and Australian Plant Name indexes. This database is anticipated to complete the task of creating a complete list of plant names, although it does not determine which are accepted species names.

== History ==
The preparation for this venture was made by Benjamin Daydon Jackson of the Linnaean Society, directed by Joseph Dalton Hooker at Kew. Charles Darwin provided the funding for the indexing project. When he died in 1882 his will stipulated that provision be made for £250 per annum over a 5-year period. In providing citations of plant names, the starting point was taken from 1753 onward; the year of publication for the Species Plantarum of Linnaeus. Darwin had found difficulties in applying these to the plants he studied, and Hooker's directive was to 'the compilation of an Index to the Names and Authorities of all known flowering plants and their countries'. While the Index has never fulfilled this original charter, it was the most comprehensive for over 100 years.

Previous attempts at a comprehensive index had relied on secondary sources, this was the first attempt to provide the original publication details of the names. A note on the country of origin was also included. The publications of De Candolle, Pfeiffer, and Bentham provided models for the acceptance of names. However, the editor admitted that not all earlier sources were included; this sometimes led to subsequent errors in botanical nomenclature.

The scope of the project was also changed in early editions, the editor noting that to include a full synonymy was too ambitious. The work originally indicated acceptance of a name, acting as a nomenclator rather than an index, but by 1913 it avoided making taxonomic judgement in its citations. The integrity of the document was liable to criticism as only representing the 'Kew view' on nomenclatural validity, the objective task of indexing gave the work itself greater international acceptance.

A description of Hooker's systematic works by F O Bower notes the "scheme originated in the difficulty he had found in the accurate naming of plants", and anticipates the importance of this work,

"Surely no greater technical benefit was ever conferred upon a future generation by the veterans of science than this Index. It smooths the way for every systematist who comes after. It stands as a monument to an intimate friendship. It bears witness to the munificence of Darwin, and the ungrudging personal care of Hooker."

== Editions ==
First published in 1893, a hard copy was reprinted in 1996, providing access to the original publication details of plant names; these were also made available in microfiche format as the Cumulated Index Kewensis. The publication titled Kew Index was issued from 1986 until 1989.

The first index contained the scientific names of 400,000 species, regular supplements were then issued on newly published names. The supplements were issued every five years, each one adding around 6000 names to the index, eventually forming a compilation of over 1,000,000 entries. The sixteenth supplement began to include bibliographic details at the rank of family and below, the later annual supplements included ferns and their allies. A digitalized version of the index was issued on a compact disc. A digital version was incorporporated with other indexes as the International Plant Names Index (IPNI), and may fulfill the original intention – a complete index of plant names. Entries at IPNI are designated with the abbreviation "(IK)".

== See also ==
- The Plant List
- Kew Rule

== Bibliography ==
- Jackson, Benjamin Daydon (1893). Hooker, Joseph Dalton (ed.). Index Kewensis plantarum phanerogamarum: nomina et synonym omnium generum et specierum a linnaeo usque as annum MDCCLXXXV complectans nomine recepro auctore patria unicuique planta subjectis: sumptibus beati Caroli Roberti Darwin ductu et consilio Josephi D. Hooker. 2 vols [Index Kewensis: an enumeration of the genera and species of flowering plants from the time of Linnaeus to the year 1885 inclusive together with their authors names, the works in which they were first published, their native countries and their synonyms: compiled at the expense of the late Charles Robert Darwin under the direction of Joseph D. Hooker]. Oxford: Clarendon Press. (at Biodiversity Heritage Library)
  - Durand, Théophile; Benjamin Daydon Jackson; William Turner Thiselton-Dyer; David Prain; Arthur William Hill; Edward James Salisbury (1908). Index Kewensis plantarum phanerogamarum: Supplementum Tertium Nomina et Synonyma Omnium Generum et Specierum AB Initio Anni MDCCCCI Usque AD Finem Anni MDCCCCV Complectens (suppl.3 (1901-1905) ed.). Royal Botanic Gardens, Kew. (at Google Books - no preview)
