= Benjamin Daydon Jackson =

British botanist

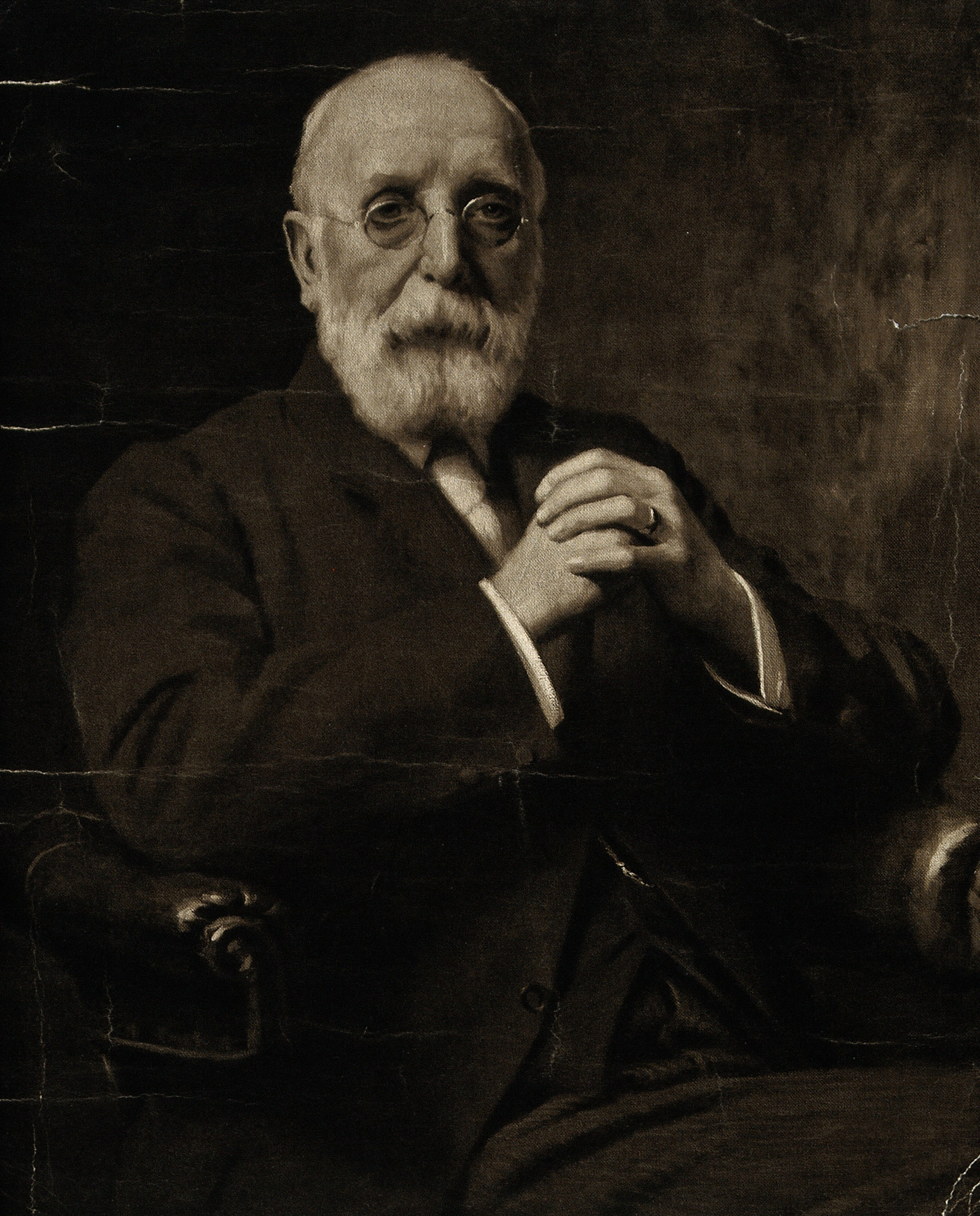
- Born: 3 April 1846; London, England
- Died: 12 October 1927 (aged 81); London, England

Benjamin Daydon Jackson (3 April 1846 – 12 October 1927) was a pioneering botanist and taxonomer who wrote the first volume of Index Kewensis to include all the flowering plants.

== Biography ==
Jackson was the eldest child of Benjamin Daydon Jackson (c.1806-1855) and Elizabeth Gaze (b.c.1815), born in London and educated at private schools. He is perhaps best known as the compiler of Index Kewensis, a reference book which appeared from 1893 to 1895, and was once accepted as authority throughout the world for names of flowering plants. In 1880 he was elected secretary of the Linnaean Society.

== Works ==
Besides the Index Kewensis, he wrote:

- Guide to the Literature of Botany (1881)
- Vegetable Technology (1882)
- Glossary of Botanical Terms (1900)
