= International Botanical Congress =

International meeting of botanists in all scientific fields held every six years

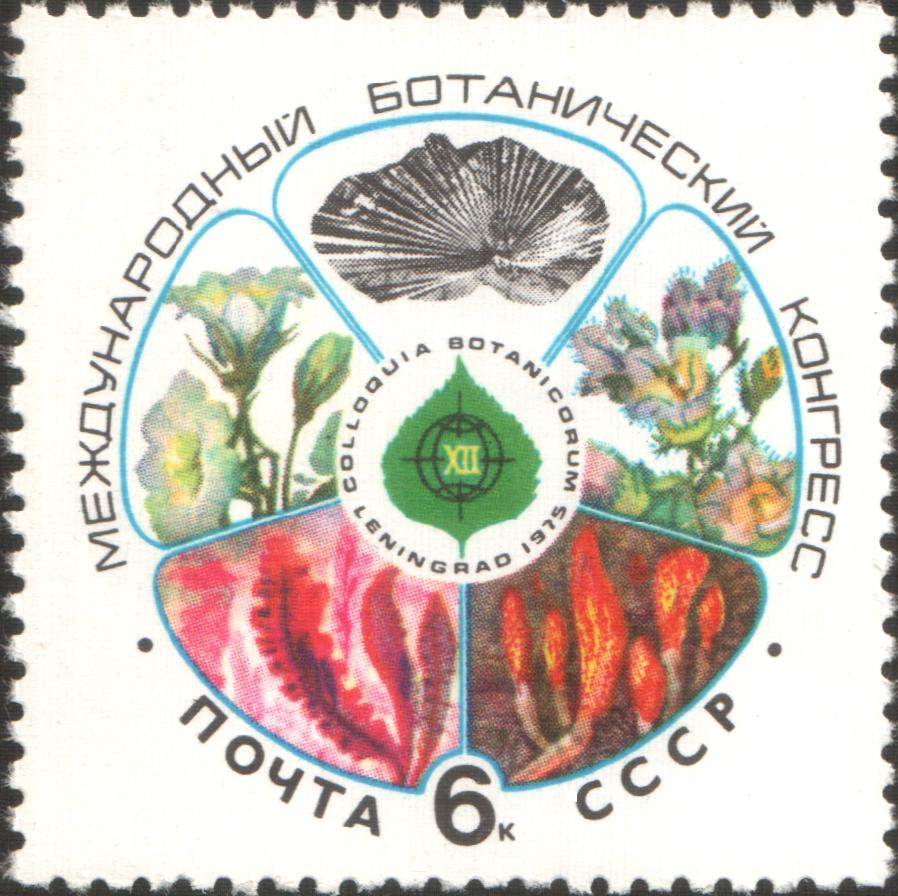
Postage stamp (USSR) for the 1975 congress

International Botanical Congress (IBC) is an international meeting of botanists in all scientific fields, authorized by the International Association of Botanical and Mycological Societies (IABMS) and held every six years, with the location rotating between different continents. The current numbering system for the congresses starts from the year 1900; the XX IBC was in Madrid, Spain, July 2024. The XXI IBC is planned to be in Cape Town, South Africa, in July 2029.

The IBC has the power to alter the ICN (International Code of Nomenclature for algae, fungi, and plants), which was renamed from the International Code of Botanical Nomenclature (ICBN) at the XVIII IBC. Formally the power resides with the Plenary Session; in practice this approves the decisions of the Nomenclature Section. The Nomenclature Section meets before the actual Congress and deals with all proposals to modify the Code: this includes ratifying recommendations from sub-committees on conservation. To reduce the risk of a hasty decision the Nomenclature Section adopts a 60% majority requirement for any change not already recommended by a committee.

== History ==
Prior to the first International Botanical Congress, local congresses concerned with natural sciences generally had grown to be very large, and a more specialized but also international meeting was considered desirable. The first annual IBC was held in 1864 in Brussels, in conjunction with an international horticultural exhibit. At the second annual congress (held in Amsterdam), Karl Koch made a proposal to standardize botanical nomenclature, and the third congress (held in London) resolved that this matter would be dealt with by the next congress.

The fourth congress, which had as one of its principal purposes to establish laws of botanical nomenclature, was organized by la Société botanique de France, and took place in Paris in August 1867. The laws adopted were based on those prepared by Alphonse de Candolle. Regular international botanical and/or horticultural congresses were held but made no further changes to nomenclature until the 1892 meeting in Genoa, which made some small changes to the laws of nomenclature. Subsequent meetings are as follows in the table below. The "Code" column shows whether a code of nomenclature was adopted.

	Year	City	Country	Code	Major actions concerning nomenclature
I	1900	Paris	France		Decisions on nomenclature deferred.
II	1905	Vienna	Austria	Yes	First binding Rules of Nomenclature; French became the official language of the meeting; requirement for Latin plant descriptions from 1908 onwards (not enforced); end of the Kew Rule.
III	1910	Brussels	Belgium	Yes	Separate starting dates for nomenclature of fungi established.
IV	1926	Ithaca	United States		Decisions on nomenclature deferred.
V	1930	Cambridge	United Kingdom	Yes	The type method incorporated; Latin requirement deferred until 1932; "absolute homonym rule" accepted, or "once a later homonym always illegitimate (unless conserved)", which altered the status of many names, including many that had previously been conserved. The Cambridge Code was not published until 1935. This code was accepted by previous proponents of the American Code, ending a period of schism.
VI	1935	Amsterdam	Netherlands		English became the official language of the Congress, replacing French. No formal Code was published.
VII	1950	Stockholm	Sweden	Yes	Adoption of the first International Code of Nomenclature for Cultivated Plants; arbitrary dates defined for some foundational works; decision to hold future congresses every five years (except four years for the next one). For fossil plants, organ genera and form genera were introduced.
VIII	1954	Paris	France	Yes	Two additional principles added, II and III, dealing with types and with priority. Proposals to conserve or reject specific names were rejected, but a committee was established to find ways to improve the stability of names.
IX	1959	Montreal	Canada	Yes	Presentation of a completely reworked list of conserved and rejected names necessitated by changes made at the 1930 congress, but the list for species was not accepted. (Note: "The proposals concerning the question of possible nomina specifica conservanda c.q. rejicienda did not result in any legislative action but were followed by an attempt to assess first the real scope of the problem before changing the rules. This may seem a minor step forward. In fact I believe it is the first real progress that has been made towards solving this difficult problem. Preface by J. Lanjouw) Decision that rules of priority do not apply above the rank of family. Starting point for family names to be Antoine Laurent de Jussieu's Genera Plantarum 1789. Choice among French, English, and German official codes of English as the standard in case of discrepancy. (Note: "As before, the Nomenclature Section decided that the Code should be published in English, French and German languages. The three texts are all official, but, should there be any inconsistency between the versions, it is agree to regard the English one arbitrarily as correct." Preface by J. Lanjouw)
X	1964	Edinburgh	United Kingdom	Yes	No major changes to the code.
XI	1969	Seattle	United States	Yes	Established the International Association of Bryologists.
XII	1975	Leningrad	Soviet Union	Yes	Official versions of the code in English, French, and German (the English version to take precedence in case of discrepancy); rejection of species names allowed in a few special cases; organ-genera for fossil plants are eliminated, replaced by form-genera.
XIII	1981	Sydney	Australia	Yes	Official versions of the code in English, French, and German (the English version to take precedence in case of discrepancy); conservation procedure (and rejection) extended to species names "of major economic importance"; fungi starting date restored to 1753 with sanctioned name status established; the types of genera and higher categories become the types of species (i.e., the taxa themselves are no longer types, only specimens or illustrations).
XIV	1987	Berlin	Germany	Yes	Official version of the code only in (British) English; later translations in French, German, and Japanese; conservation extended to species names that represent the type of a conserved generic name.
XV	1993	Tokyo	Japan	Yes	Moves towards registration of plant names; extensive re-arrangement of the nomenclature code; official version of the code only in (British) English; later translations in Chinese, French, German, Italian, Japanese, Russian, and Slovak; conservation extended to all species names; rejection permitted for any name that would cause a disadvantageous nomenclatural change; epitype concept introduced.
XVI	1999	St. Louis	United States	Yes	Refinement of type requirements; illustrations as types mostly forbidden from 1958; morphotaxa for fossils. Proposals defeated included the BioCode and registration of plant names.
XVII	2005	Vienna	Austria	Yes	Morphotaxa and regular taxa for fossils; illustrations as types mostly forbidden from 2007; glossary added to the code of nomenclature.
XVIII	2011	Melbourne	Australia	Yes	Electronic publication permitted; registration of fungal names; English or Latin descriptions (or diagnoses) from 2012; the concepts of anamorph and teleomorph (for fungi) and morphotaxa (for fossils) eliminated.
XIX	2017	Shenzhen	China	Yes
XX	2024	Madrid	Spain	Yes	The 2023 IBC in Brazil was cancelled due to COVID-19 pandemic, combined with the serious economic impact and social disruption. The XX IBC was rescheduled to Madrid in 2024. Hundreds of kaffir-related species names were voted to be changed.
XXI	2029	Cape Town	South Africa

== Committees ==
=== Nomenclature Committee for Fungi ===
The Nomenclature Committee for Fungi (NCF) is a permanent committee of the IBC, appointed to discuss the international rules applied to fungi, especially their taxonomy. The members of the NCF are elected every six years. The internationally agreed rules that regulate how fungi are named are examined and revised at each International Botanical Congress, held every six years. As of 2021, Scott Alan Redhead chairs the committee.
