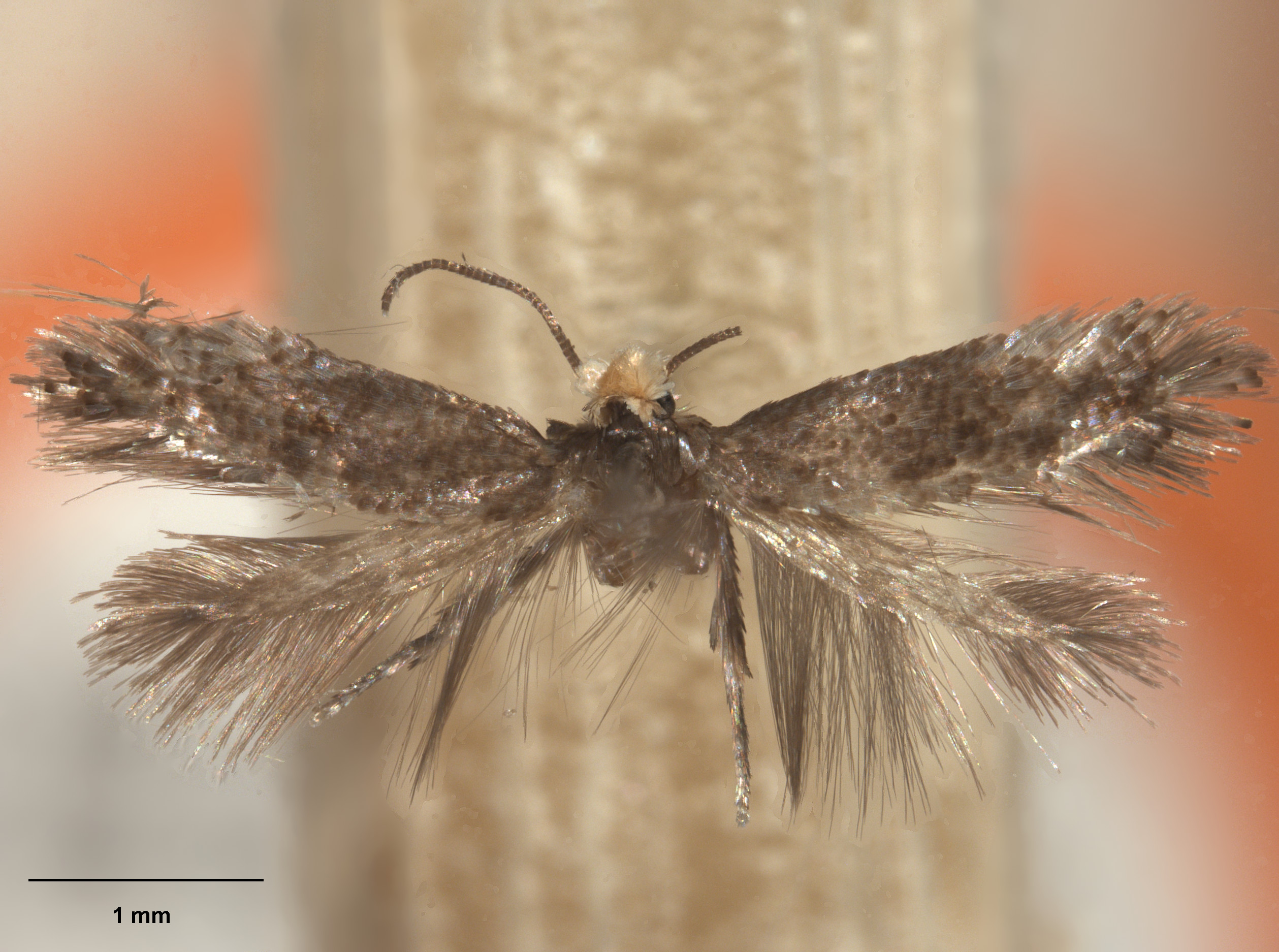
- Holotype specimen

Scientific classification
- Kingdom: Animalia
- Phylum: Arthropoda
- Clade: Pancrustacea
- Class: Insecta
- Order: Lepidoptera
- Family: Nepticulidae
- Genus: Stigmella
- Species: S. hakekeae

Binomial name
- Stigmella hakekeae Donner & Wilkinson, 1989

= Stigmella hakekeae =

Species of moth endemic to New Zealand

Stigmella hakekeae is a moth of the family Nepticulidae. It is endemic to New Zealand and is found in the North, South and Stewart Islands. The larvae feed on Olearia species and are leaf miners. This species pupates in a silk cocoon on the ground underneath its host plant. Adults are on the wing most months of year except for March and April. They have been observed flying during the day near their host plant. There are four or five generations per year. This species is regarded as being widely distributed and locally abundant.

== Taxonomy ==
This species was first described in 1989 by Hans Donner and Christopher Wilkinson from specimens collected in the Taupō, Canterbury, Otago and Southland regions as well as at Stewart Island. The male holotype specimen, collected in Dunedin in November 1920, is held at Te Papa.

== Description ==
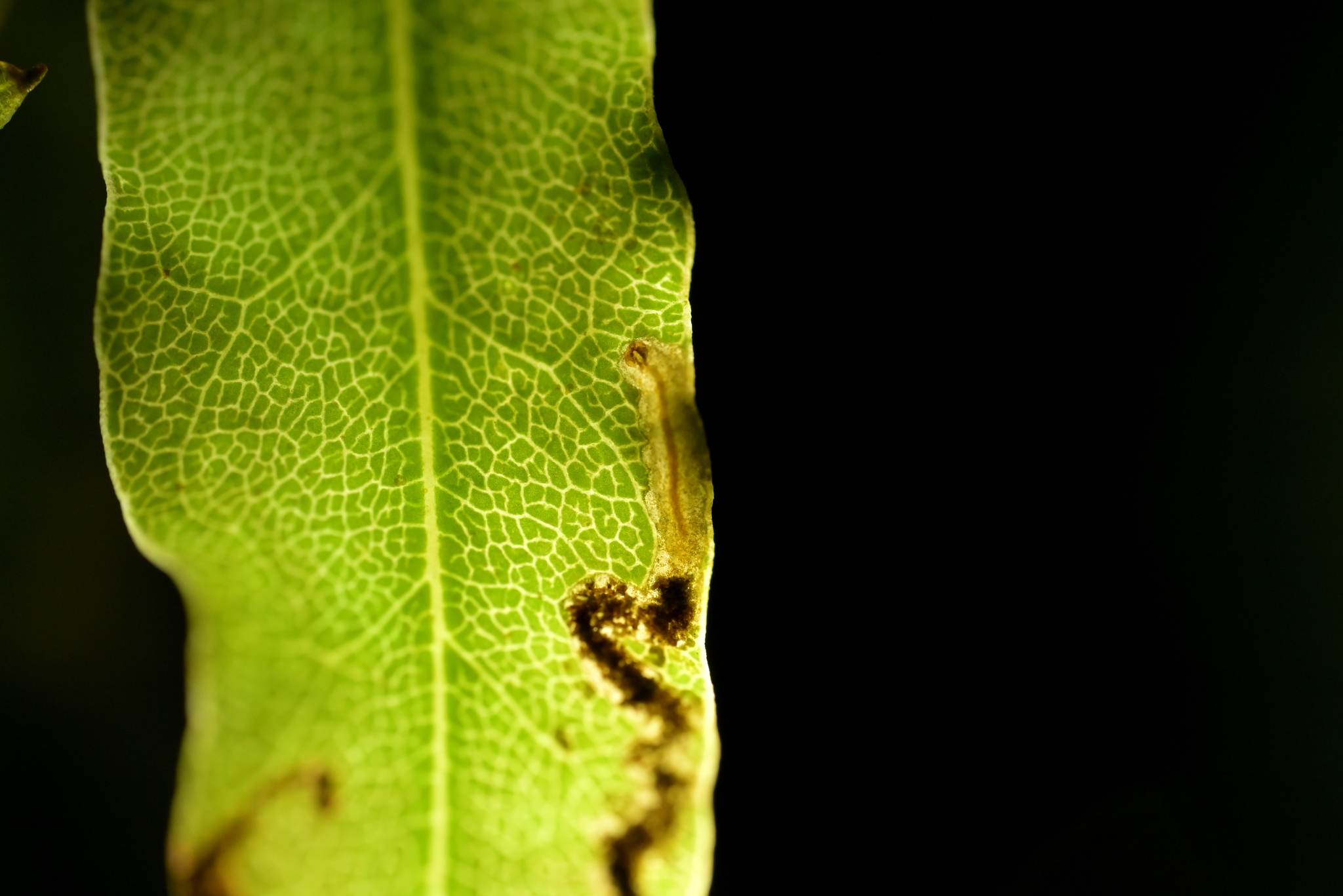
Larva of S. hakekeae.

The larvae are 3 to 4 mm long and are coloured greenish white. The mine is formed in the top layer of the leaf with the mine running from a leaf rib, to the edge of the leaf and then following along that edge. It differs from the mine S. fulva as there is no purple discolouration of the leaf in the region of the egg.

Donner and Wilkinson described the male and the female of this species as follows:

Head. Frontal tuft rusty white; scape white; collar cream, sometimes with brown scales; antenna grey, comprising 32 segments. Thorax grey. Forewing about 3 mm long, speckled brown-grey, with 2 obscure white postmedial areas, one at dorsum, one at costa; fringe grey. Hindwing and fringe pale grey. Abdomen grey.

== Distribution ==
This species is endemic to New Zealand. It is found in the North, South and Stewart Islands.

== Life cycle ==
=== Larvae ===
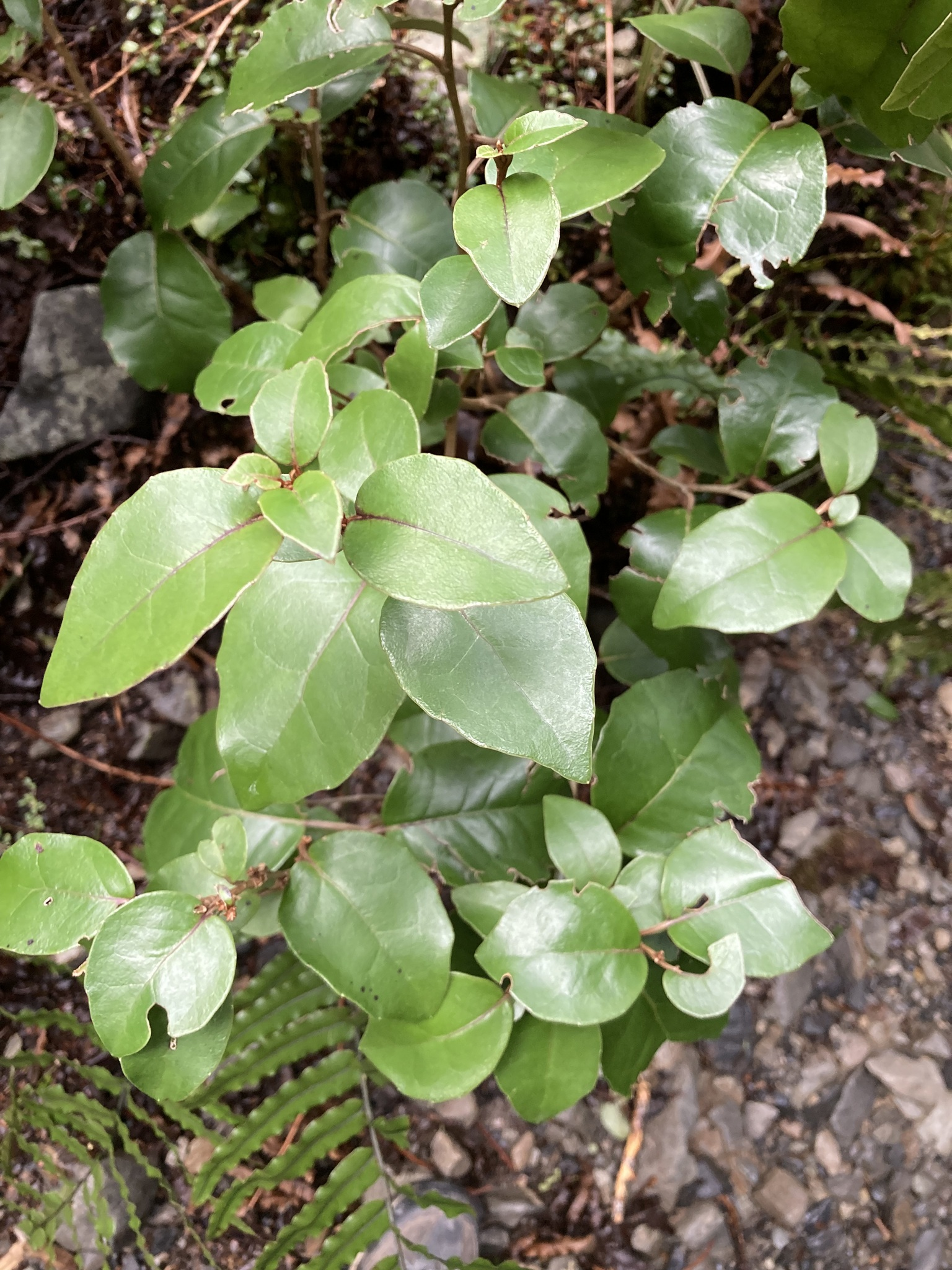
Larval host O. arborescens.

The larvae feed on Olearia species, such as Olearia arborescens, Olearia ilicifolia, Olearia macrodonta, Olearia nummulariifolia and Olearia paniculata. They mine the leaves of their host plant. Larva have been recorded from May to August and in October.

=== Pupae ===
The cocoon is made of brown silk and can be found on the ground under the host plant.

=== Adults ===
Adults have been recorded in every month except March and April. There are four or five generations per year.

== Behaviour ==
This moth can be seen flying during the day near its host plants. This species has been reared on Olearia paniculata sourced from the Marlborough Sounds and on Olearia arborescens, Olearia ilicifolia, Olearia avicenniifolia and Olearia nummulariifolia sourced from other locations including Tiwai Point and Longwood Range. This species is regarded as widely distributed and locally abundant.
