= Brachyscome tenuiscapa =

Scientific classification
- Kingdom: Plantae
- Clade: Tracheophytes
- Clade: Angiosperms
- Clade: Eudicots
- Clade: Asterids
- Order: Asterales
- Family: Asteraceae
- Genus: Brachyscome
- Species: B. tenuiscapa

Binomial name
- Brachyscome tenuiscapa Hook.f.
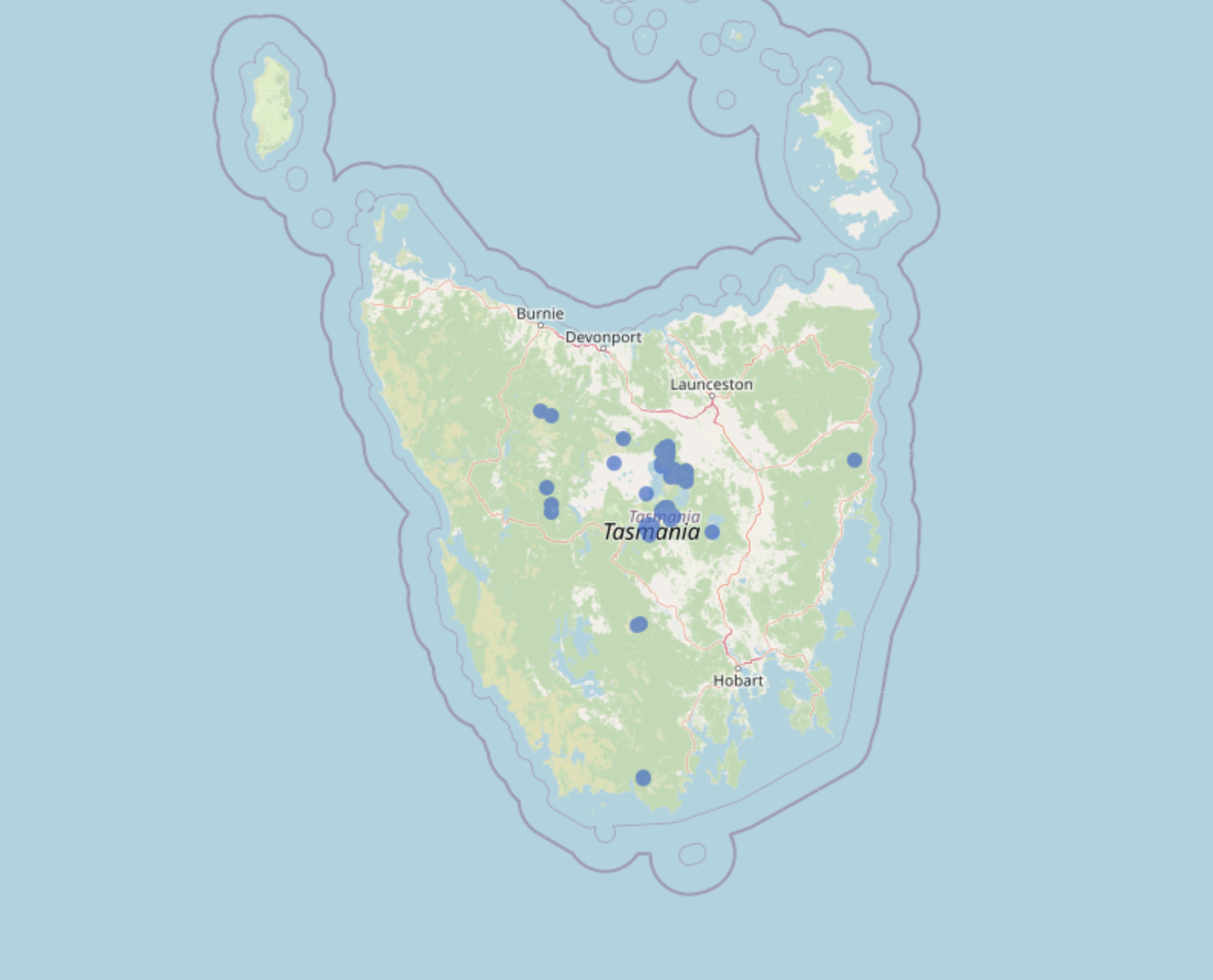
- Tasmanian distribution of Brachyscome tenuiscarpa

Synonyms
- Brachyscome scapiformis DC.; Brachyscome scapiformis var. scapiformis; Brachyscome scapiformis var. tenuiscapa (Hook.fil.) Benth.

Species of flowering plant

Brachyscome tenuiscapa, commonly known as mountain daisy, is a perennial herb in the family Asteraceae and is endemic to Tasmania. It commonly occurs in alpine environments, and was previously conglomerated with B. foliosa before being reclassified in 2014. It has white or mauve flowers with a yellow centre.

== Description ==
Brachyscome tenuiscapa is a perennial herb with a long, slender stem holding a singular white or mauve flower-head. The length of the stem ranges from 8–22 cm (3.1–8.7 in), and are unbranched, with small, leafy bracts and glandular hairs. Leaves are spoon-shaped, arranged in a small basal rosette and are distinctively toothed, 5–10 mm (0.20–0.39 in) wide and 2–3 cm (0.79–1.18 in) long. Flower-heads are 2–3 cm (0.79–1.18 in) across, and involucral bract tips are acute to subacute. Disc florets are a bright yellow with five lobes. The fruit is a dark brown to purplish-brown achene, wedge-shaped and slightly thickened at the margins. The pappus of B. tenuiscapa is white and very short, as is characteristic of the genus.

B. tenuiscapa can be confused with Brachyscome scapigeraa, as they are both alpine plants with similar fruits and flowers, but B. scapigera has hairless leaves without toothing, and the basal cluster of leaves is more upright.

B. tenuiscapa can be distinguished from the mainland Australian species Brachyscome foliosa (which which it was classified with for many years) as B. foliosa has black achenes, more leaves on the scape, and is more lobed than B. tenuiscapa.

== Distribution and habitat ==
B. tenuiscapa mainly occurs in damp alpine or subalpine grasslands, heathlands, and herb fields, colonising bare patches via basal shoots. In Tasmania, its distribution is more concentrated in the Central Highlands, around Great Lake, although it has also been found at the northern edge of Mt Field National Park, as well as in the Southern Ranges. It is commonly associated with Poa species, particularly Poa gunnii, as well as heaths such as Epacris gunnii and Richea scoparia, peas such as Bossiaea riparia, other Asteraceaes such as Olearia algida, and even amongst cushion plant species Donatia novae-zelandiae.

== Taxonomy and meaning ==
The species name of B. tenuiscarpa is derived from the Latin tenue, meaning slender, and skapus, meaning scape. It was originally described by Hooker in 1867 as a variation of B. scapiformis, before becoming its own species - albeit with B. foliosa - in 1948. In 2014 the two species were distinguished and classed separately by J. S. Short.
