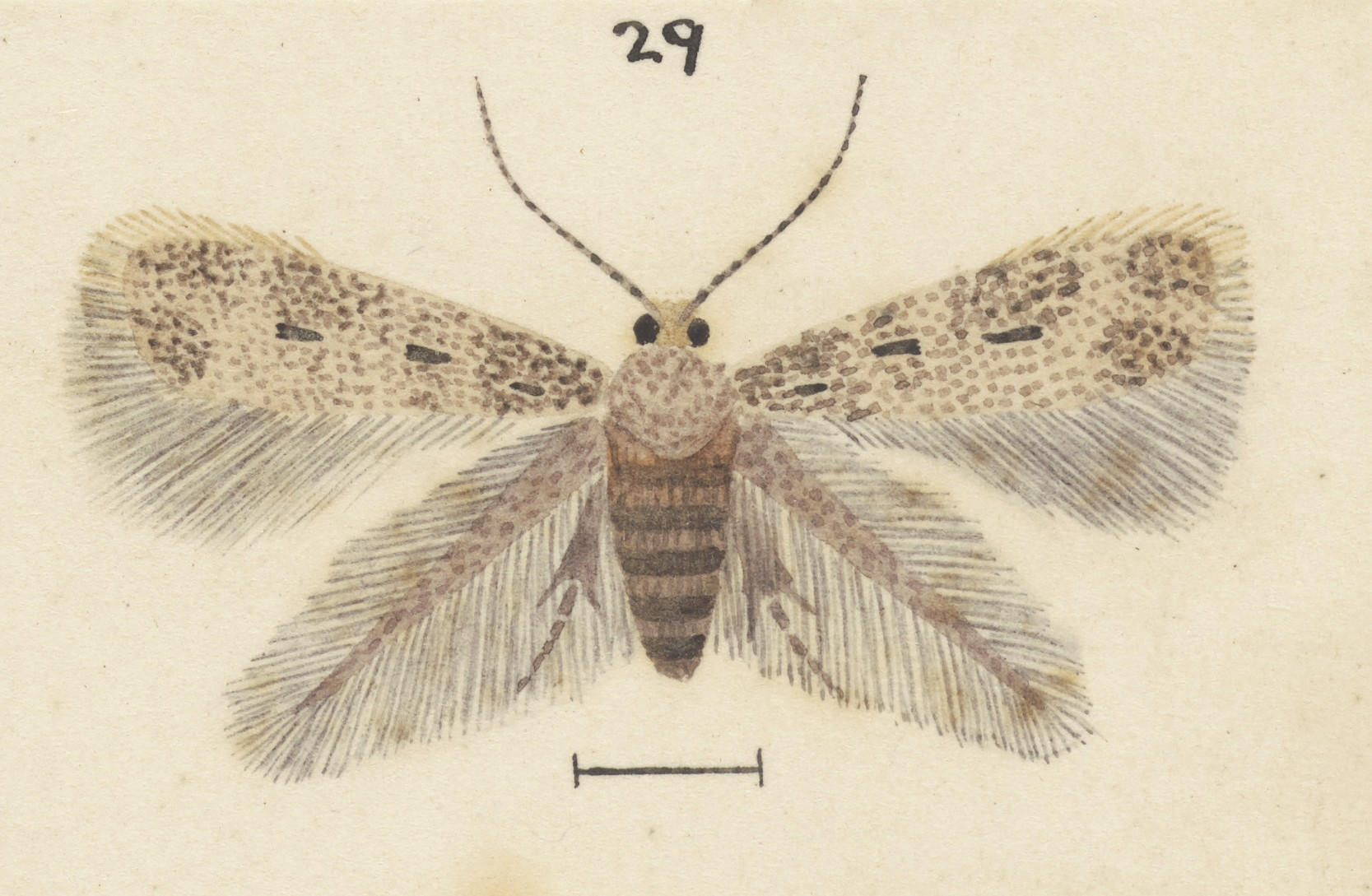

Scientific classification
- Kingdom: Animalia
- Phylum: Arthropoda
- Clade: Pancrustacea
- Class: Insecta
- Order: Lepidoptera
- Family: Nepticulidae
- Genus: Stigmella
- Species: S. fulva

Binomial name
- Stigmella fulva (Watt, 1921)

Synonyms
- Nepticula fulva Watt, 1921

= Stigmella fulva =

Species of moth endemic to New Zealand

Stigmella fulva is a moth of the family Nepticulidae. It is endemic to New Zealand and has been observed in the North Island around Mount Taranaki, in the South Island and at Stewart Island. The species' eggs are laid singly but a considerable number may be deposited on the upper surface of one leaf. The incubation period can last from a week to a month depending on climatic conditions. The larvae mine the leaves of their host plants which are all in the genus Olearia. Larvae have been recorded in all months except January, February and June. The cocoon is brown and spun amongst the leaf litter under its host plant. The pupal period has been shown to range from 21 days to 79 days, again depending on climatic conditions. Adults have been observed on the wing January until March and August to December. They are active in the sun about their larval food plant.

== Taxonomy ==
This species was first described by Morris Netterville Watt in 1921 using specimens collected in Dunedin and named Nepticula fulva. George Hudson illustrated and discussed this species under this name in his book The butterflies and moths of New Zealand. In 1988 J. S. Dugdale placed this species within the genus Stigmella. Hans Donner and Christopher Wilkinson agreed with this placement in their monograph on New Zealand Nepticulidae. The syntypes are held at Te Papa.

== Description ==
The egg is relatively large, and when newly laid is bright blue in colour. Empty shells are white and filled with frass. In shape oval, wafer-like, domed above; a narrow flattened and somewhat ragged fringe surrounds the foot. The shell is strong, transparent, shiny, devoid of sculpture except for a slight roughening. Dimensions are—total length, 0.48 mm.; width, 0.38 mm.; height, 0.12 mm.

The larvae of this species are 4–5 mm long and pale yellow. Length when full-grown, the length is about 5 mm. Ground-colour pale green; central marking dark olive-green in its first half, darker in its caudal half. Head pale greyish-brown; darker reddish-brown sutural lines; almost acutely triangular in shape; retractile.

The length of the forewings of the adult moth is 4–5 mm. Watt described the female of the species as follows:

Female, 8mm. Head and prothorax light yellowish-brown; antennae under 1 and over 1/2 dark brown; abdomen ash grey; legs light- brownish. Thorax and forewings pale-whitish densely irrorated with darker brown scales; a small irregular black spot in wing near dorsum at 1/4, another in centre a little beyond 1/4, a third in centre of wing near termen; the central spot is the most constant. Cilia light brown, a brown cilial line found only in very perfect specimens; the whole wing and cilia with bronzy reflections, seen only in some lights. Hindwings and cilia grey-brownish. In the male the brown scales in ‘the forewings are largely replaced by darker grey ones, and the central spots, though still present, are not so prominent.

Adults have been recorded from January to March and from August to December. Reared specimens emerged in May and July. There are apparently continuous generations throughout the year.

== Distribution ==
This species is endemic to New Zealand. This species has been observed in the North Island around Mount Taranaki, in the South Island and at Stewart Island.

== Life cycle ==
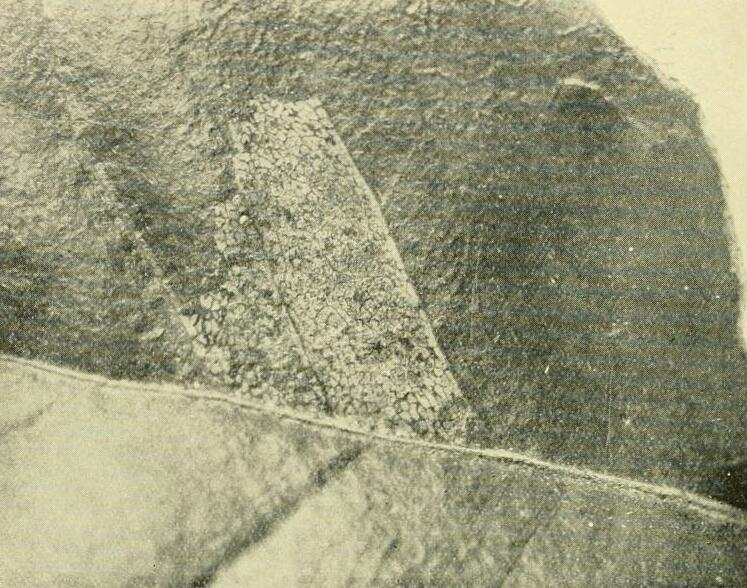
S. fulva mine.

=== Eggs ===
The eggs are laid singly, but a considerable number may be deposited on one leaf. They are laid on the upper surface, but otherwise have no fixed locality, though the upper and outer two-thirds of the leaves appear to contain the majority of the mines. Some ova may be found laid on entirely dead portions of the leaf, over long-disused mines, and even sometimes upon or overlapping one another, when the larvae must perish. The egg is strongly attached to the surface of the leaf, and persists for a considerable time even after the mine has been vacated. The egg-capacity of the moth is not known. The period of incubation may be anything from seven days to a month, or longer, according to local climatic conditions.

=== Larvae ===
The larvae mine the leaves of their host plant. Larva have been recorded in all months except January, February and June.

=== Cocoon ===
The cocoon is brown and spun in the ground amongst the leaf litter under its host plant. The colouration of the cocoon blends in with the detritus on the ground. The pupal period varies according to climatic conditions. Watt, when rearing these moths, noted that the pupal period ranged from 21 days to 79 days. Before emergence the pupa is extruded from the cocoon as far as the fourth or fifth abdominal segment.

=== Adults ===
The adults have been observed on the wing January until March and August to December. They are active in the sun about their larval food plant.

== Host species ==
The larvae feed on Olearia species, including Olearia traversiorum, Olearia arborescens, Olearia ilicifolia, and Olearia macrodonta. The species is most commonly found on Olearia arborescens.
