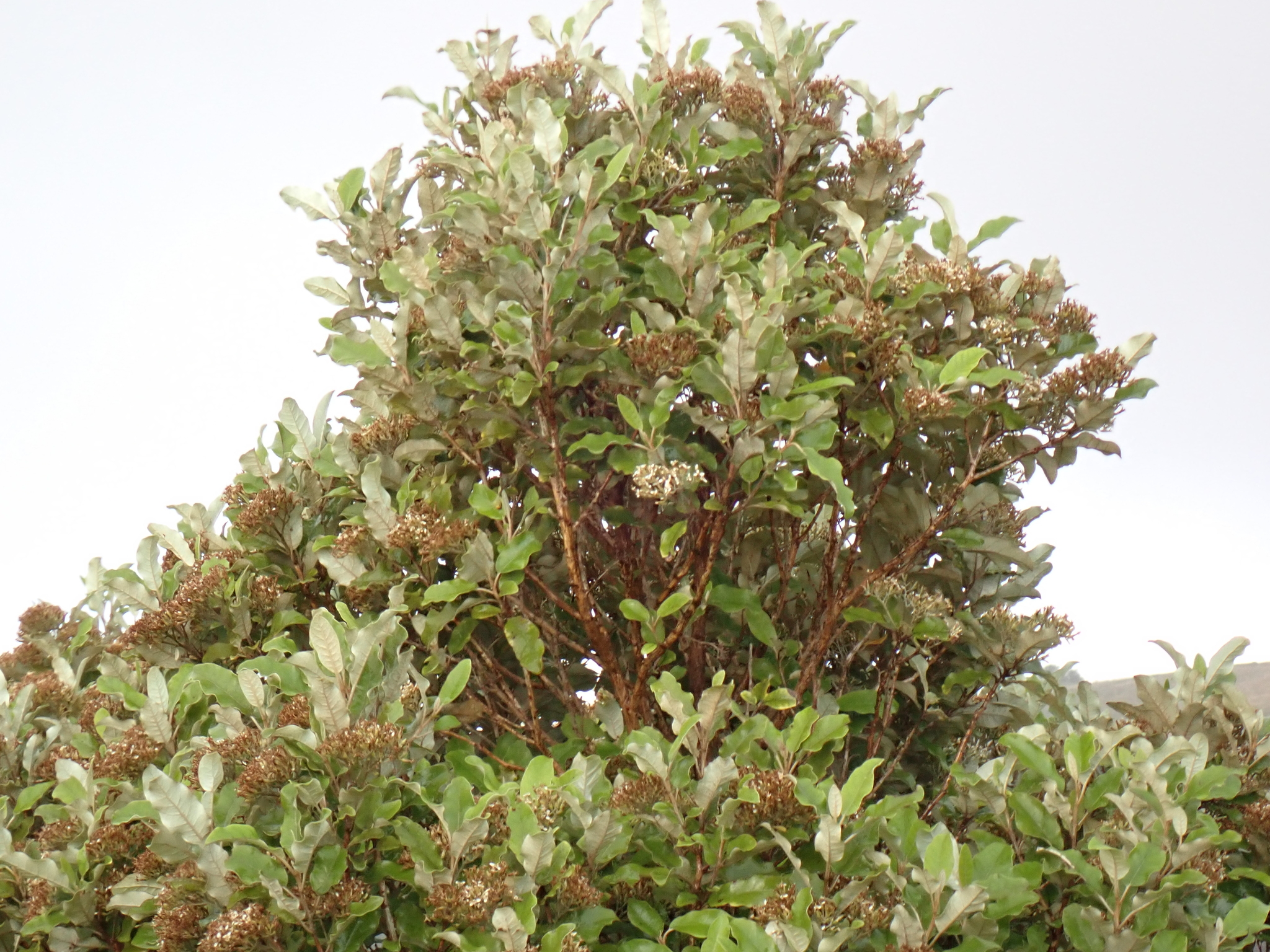

Conservation status
- Declining (NZ TCS)

Scientific classification
- Kingdom: Plantae
- Clade: Tracheophytes
- Clade: Angiosperms
- Clade: Eudicots
- Clade: Asterids
- Order: Asterales
- Family: Asteraceae
- Genus: Shawia
- Species: S. albida

Binomial name
- Shawia albida (Hook.f.) Sch.Bip.

Synonyms
- Aster albidus (Hook.f.) Kuntze; Eurybia albida Hook.f.; Olearia albida (Hook.f.) Hook.f.

= Shawia albida =

Species of plant

Shawia albida, also known by the name tanguru or tree daisy, is a species of flowering plant in the family Asteraceae. The plant was first described by Joseph Dalton Hooker in 1852, and is endemic to the northern North Island of New Zealand, often found in coastal areas.

== Taxonomy ==
The species was formally described as Eurybia albida by Joseph Dalton Hooker in 1852. The species epithet albida is based on the Latin word alba, meaning "somewhat white". In 1864 Hooker placed the species in genus Olearia as O. albida. After the genus Olearia was found to be polyphyletic, the genus Shawia was reinstated, and the name Shawia viscosa, first proposed by Carl Heinrich "Bipontinus" Schultz in 1861, became the accepted species name.

The species' closest relative is Shawia paniculata from which it diverged an estimated 1.8 million years ago. The genus is thought to have speciated around 3.5 million years ago, and is most closely related to other members of subtribe Celmisiinae, including the genus Celmisia (New Zealand daisies).

== Description ==
Hooker's 1864 type description of the species is as follows:

A small tree, very like O. fosteri in habit and foliage, but the leaves are not evidently reticulate on either surface, the under surface is rather softer and very white, the panicles larger, more effuse. Heads quite different, pedicelled, 0.2 in (5.1 mm). long, subcylindric; involucral scales imbricate, short, obtuse, pubescent; florets 2 or 3, one often ligulate; pappus white, unequal. Achene pubescent.

The species has grooved, flaky bark and light green leaves with a white underside, that are typically wavy. The species has white flowers that typically form in clusters. The species can grow to a height of up to 5 m (16 ft) tall.

== Distribution and habitat ==
The species is endemic to New Zealand, found on the North Island as far south as northern Taranaki, as well as on offshore islands of the Hauraki Gulf. Some hotspot locations for the species include Tāpapakanga Regional Park and the northern shores of the Matakana River mouth.

The species is found in coastal areas, typically headlands and areas with loose soil (such as slip scars).

== Conservation ==
While the species is widely distributed, many populations are in decline, threatened by invasive weeds, coastal erosion and animal browsing. While previous considered a non-threatened plant, in 2024 the New Zealand Threat Classification System upgraded its rating of the species from Not Threatened to Declining.

== Gallery ==
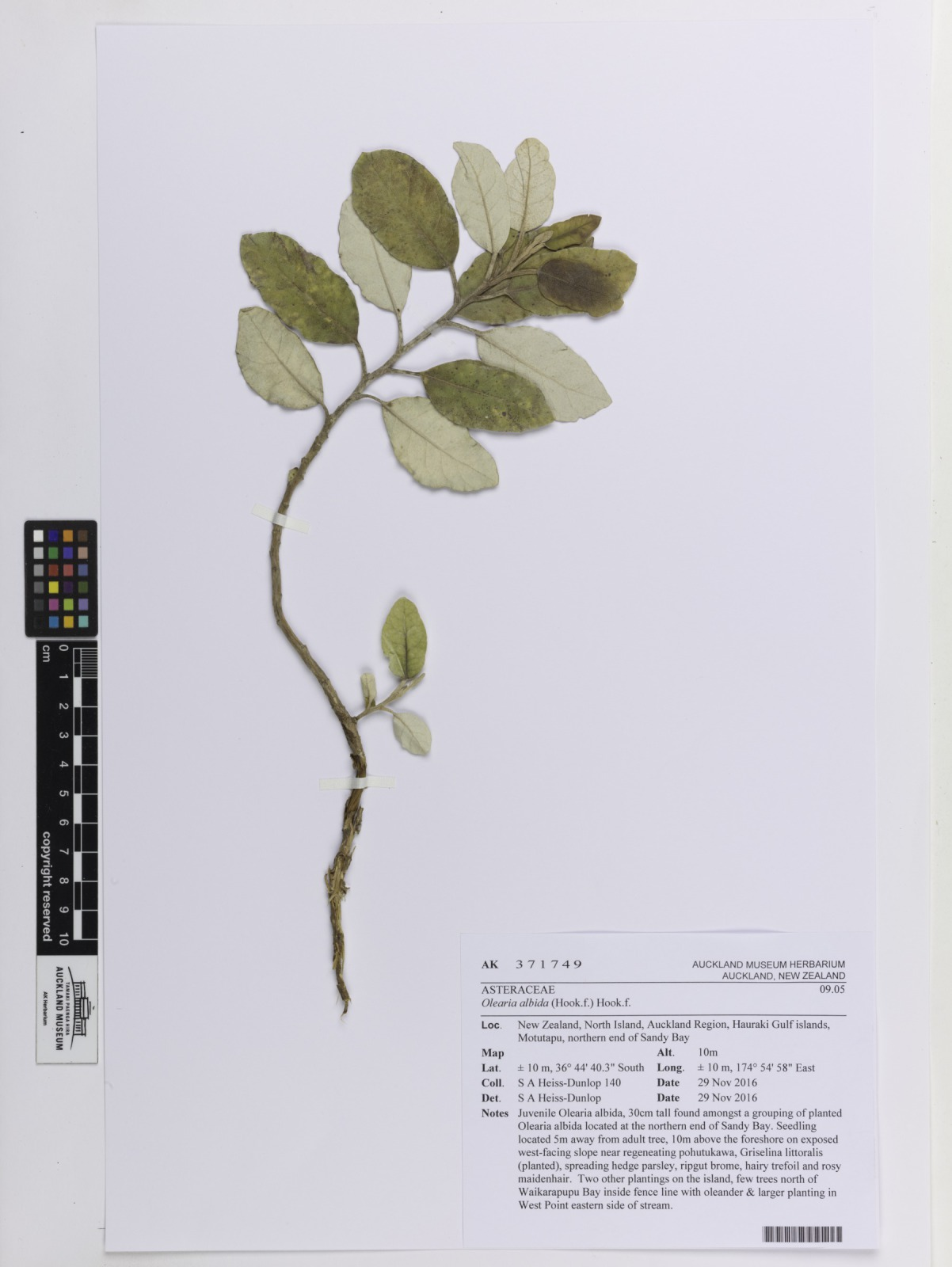
Specimen from the herbarium of the Auckland War Memorial Museum

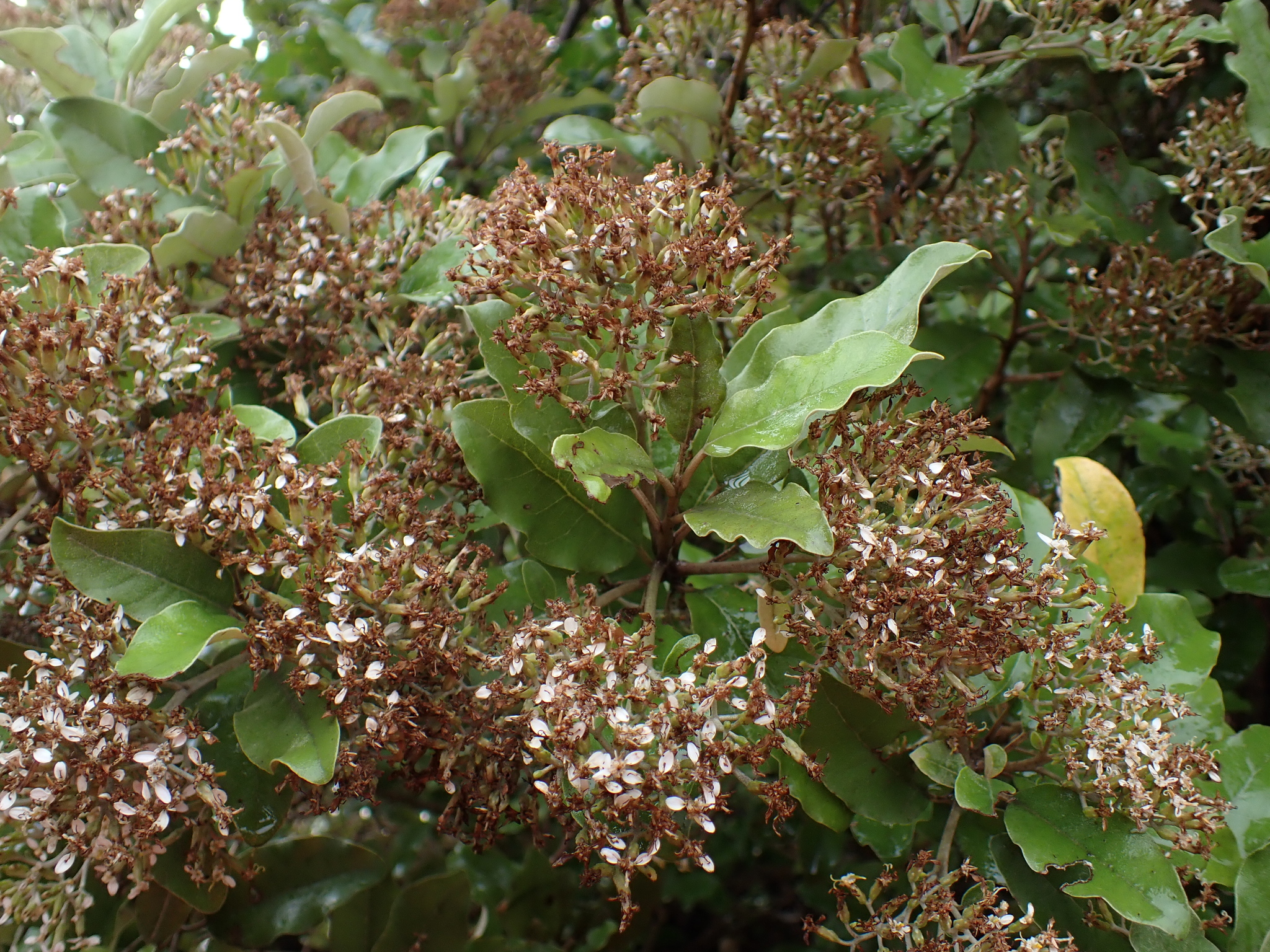
Flowers of Shawia albida

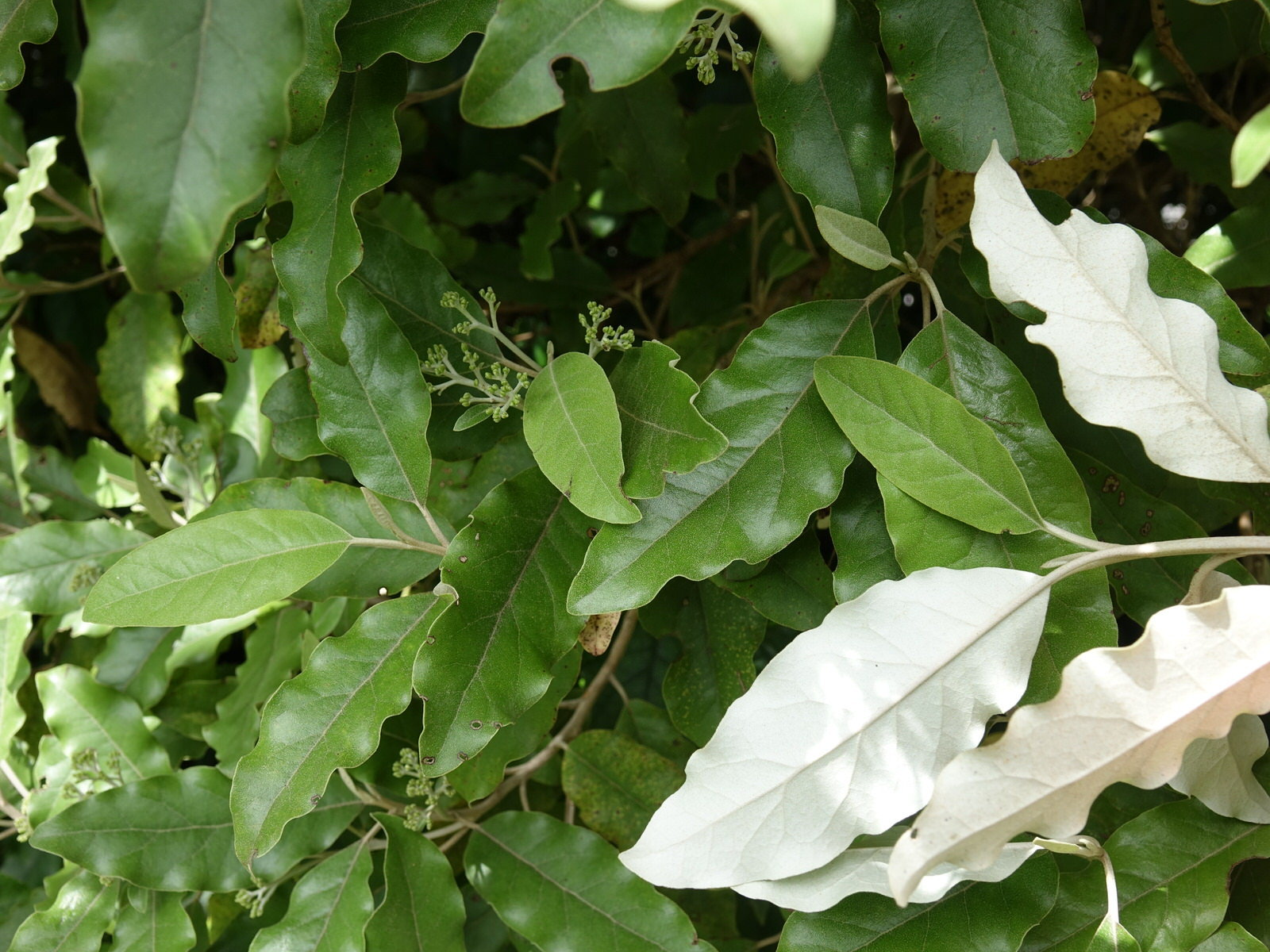
Leaves of Shawia albida

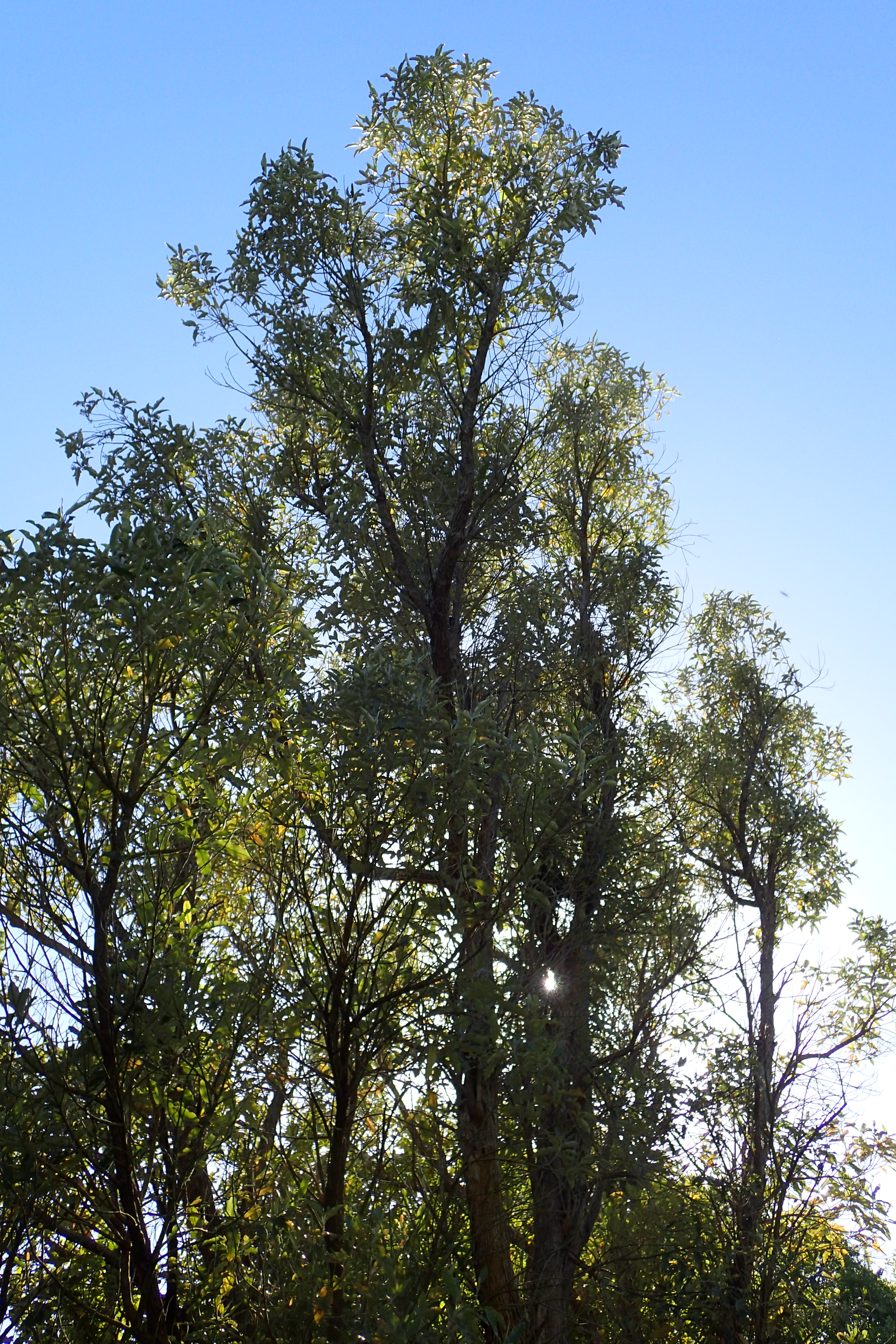
A tall Shawia albida growing at the Dunedin Botanic Gardens
