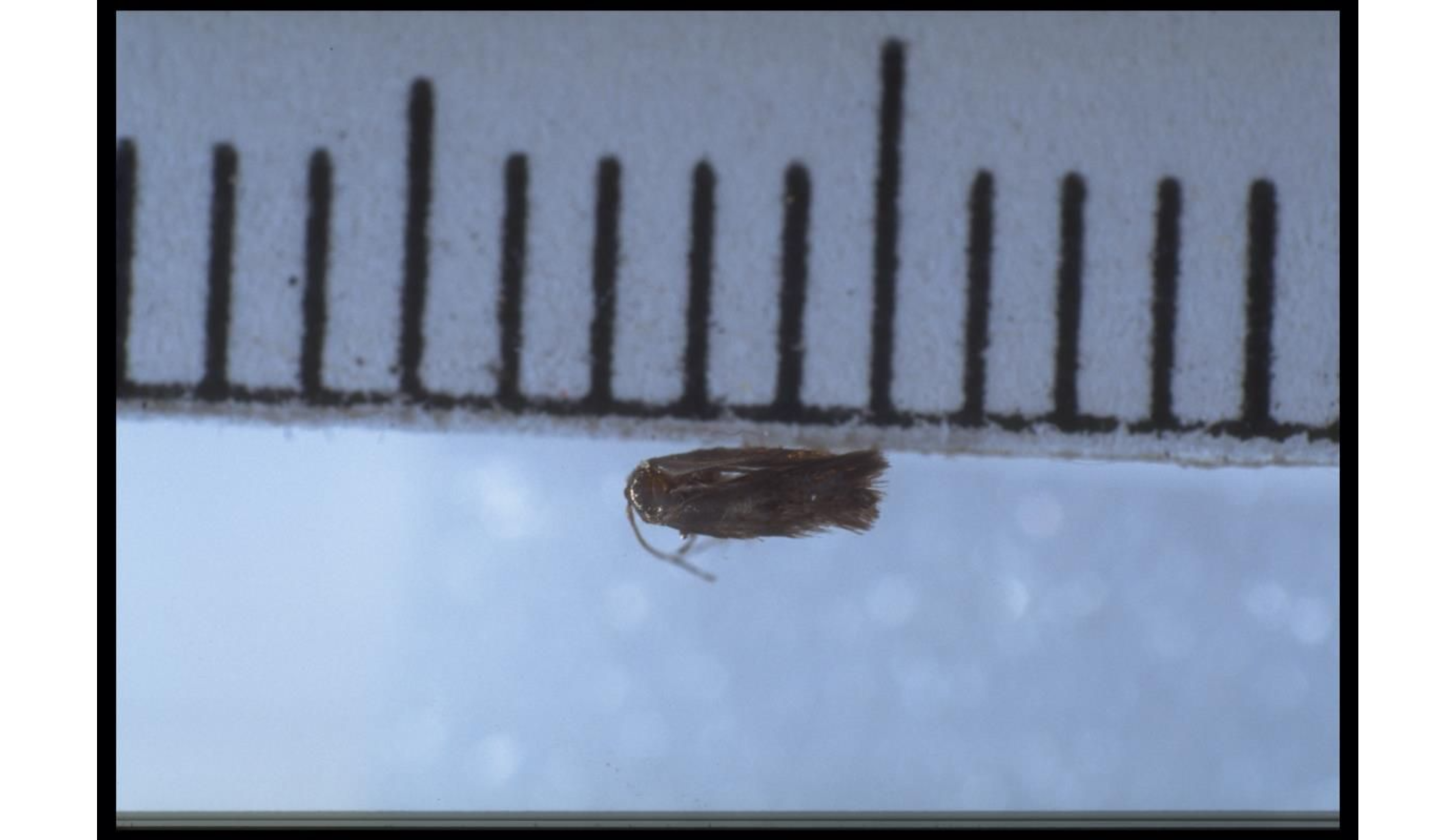
- Male holotype

Scientific classification
- Kingdom: Animalia
- Phylum: Arthropoda
- Clade: Pancrustacea
- Class: Insecta
- Order: Lepidoptera
- Family: Nepticulidae
- Genus: Stigmella
- Species: S. erysibodea

Binomial name
- Stigmella erysibodea Donner & Wilkinson, 1989

= Stigmella erysibodea =

Species of moth endemic to New Zealand

Stigmella erysibodea is a species of moth of the family Nepticulidae. It is endemic to New Zealand and has been observed in both the North and South Islands. The larvae of this species are leaf miners and feed on the leaves of Olearia ilicifolia and Olearia albida. Adults have been observed on the wing in November and February.

== Taxonomy ==
This species was first described in 1989 by Hans Donner and Christopher Wilkinson from specimens collected in the Taupō, Taranaki and Fiordland regions. The male holotype specimen, collected at Lyttle's Flat, Hollyford Valley on the 3 February 1976 "on Olearia ilicifolia" by J. S. Dugdaleis, is held at the New Zealand Arthropod Collection.

== Description ==
Donner and Wilkinson described the adult male of this species as follows:

Head. Frontal tuft white; scape brown; collar brown-grey; antenna brown, comprising 42 segments. Thorax brown-grey. Forewing 3-4 mm long, slender, with fore and hind margins more or less parallel; browngrey with irregularly scattered paler spots, lustrous, reflecting smooth silvery grey that seems to cover wing with a thin, transparent layer; fringe brown, short, thickly set. Hindwing and fringe grey. Abdomen brown-grey.

Donner and Wilkinson also described the female of the species as follows:

As for male, but with about 30 antennal segments, and wing fringe longer.

S. erysibodea is similar in appearance to S. atrata, however it is smaller in size.

== Distribution ==
S. erysibodea is endemic to New Zealand. It has been observed in both the North and South Islands.

== Behaviour ==
The larvae mine the leaves of their host plants. Adults have been observed on the wing in November and February.

== Host ==
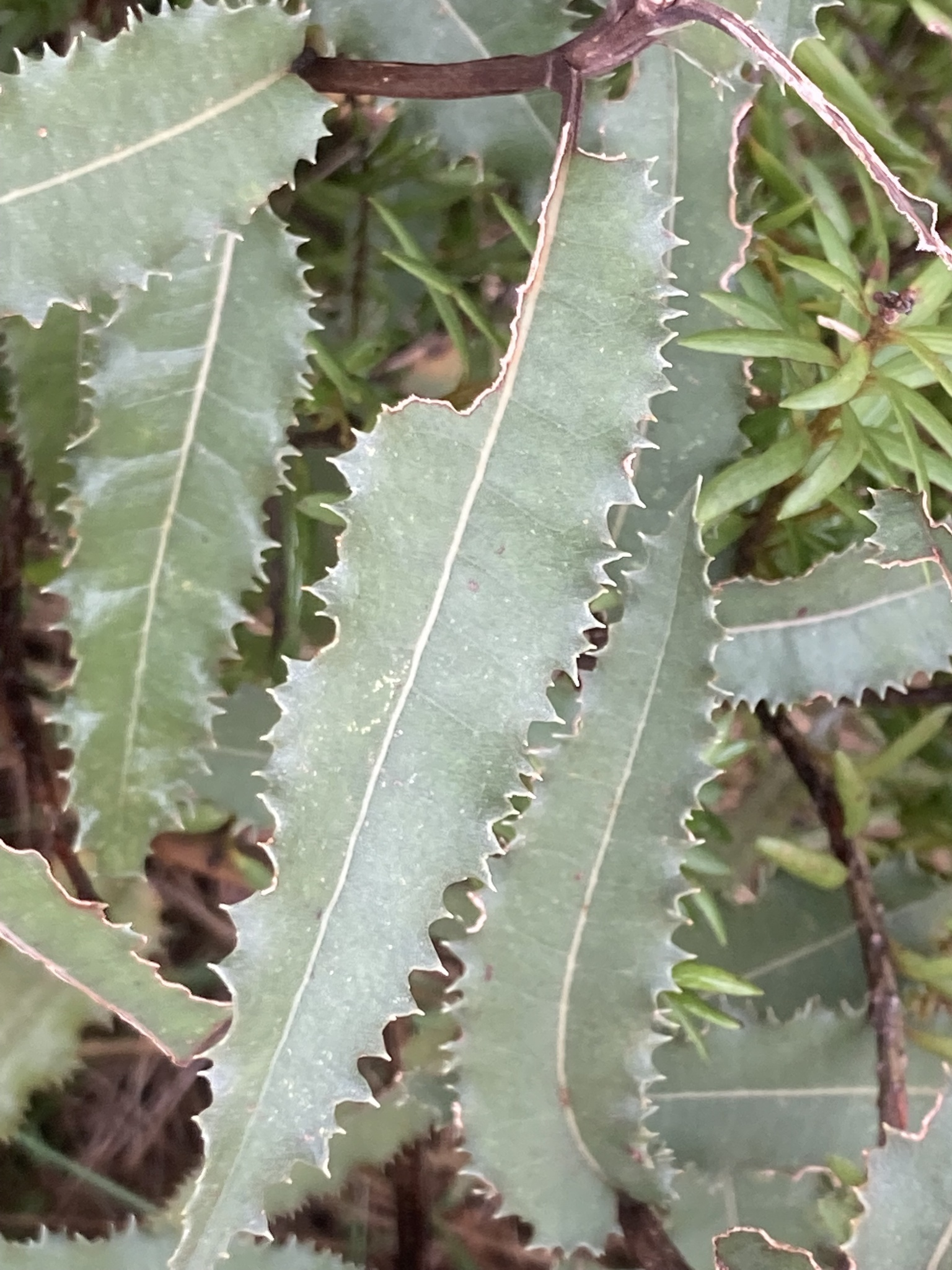
Leaves of larval host, O. ilicifolia.

The larvae have been shown to feed on Olearia ilicifolia, a species that is endemic to New Zealand, and also Olearia albida, a south-eastern Australian species cultivated in New Zealand, as the moth has been successfully reared from both these plants.
