= Tāpapakanga Regional Park =

New Zealand regional park

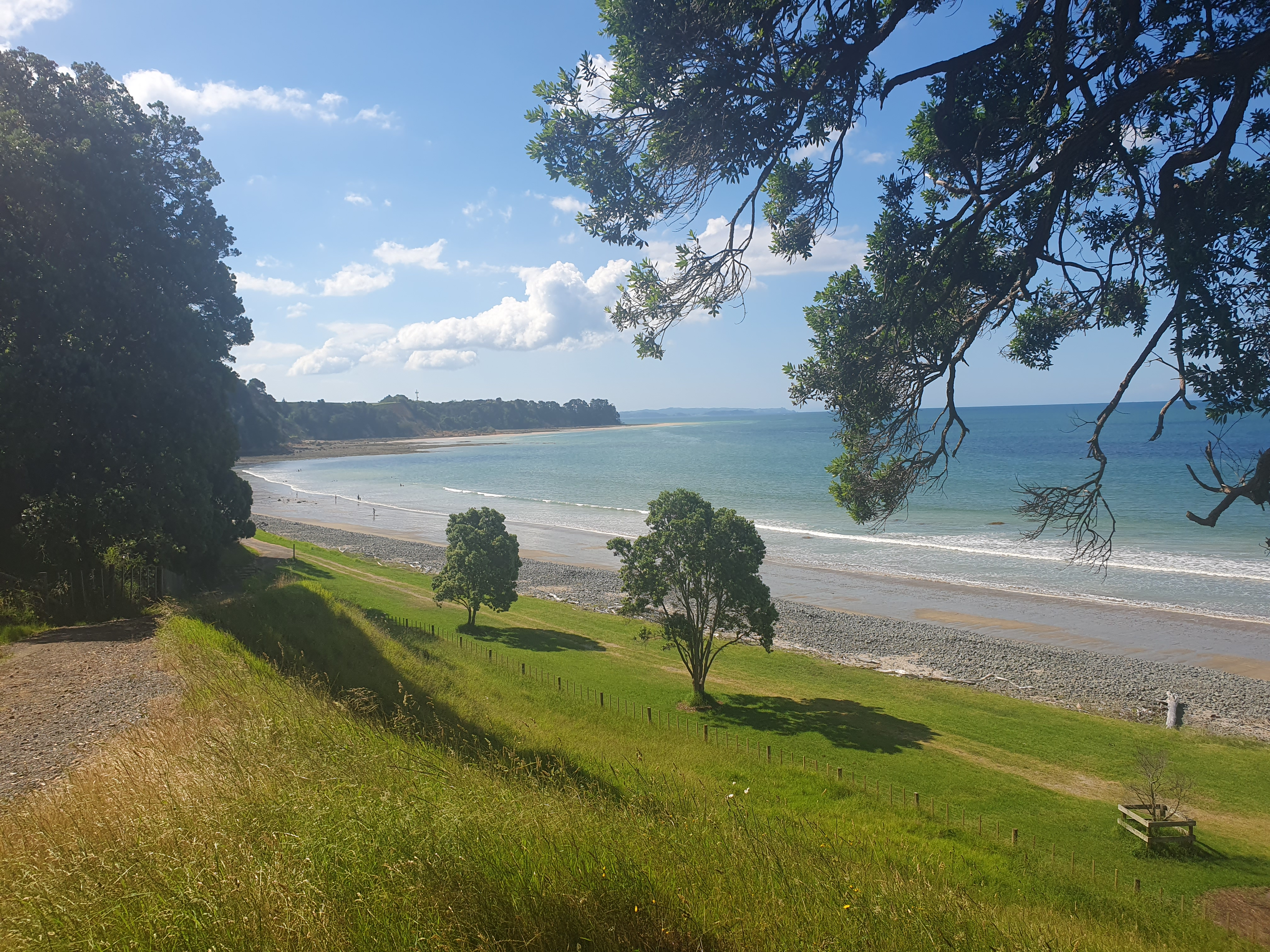

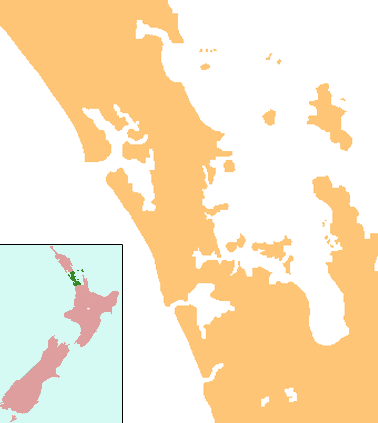
- Location within New Zealand Auckland
- Location: Franklin, Auckland, New Zealand
- Coordinates: 36.9791°S 175.2582°E
- Area: 120 ha (300 acres)
- Operator: Auckland Council

Tāpapakanga Regional Park is a regional park situated in the Auckland Region of New Zealand's North Island. It is located in Franklin, east of Kawakawa Bay, and is owned and operated by Auckland Council.

== Geography and biodiversity ==
The park is a mix of farmland, coastal bush and beach, overlooking the Firth of Thames. The native bush remnants include taraire, tānekaha, tawa and rewarewa trees. The park is a known hotspot where the coastal tree species tanguru (Olearia albida) occurs.

== History ==
The land was an important place for the Marutūāhu iwi of the Hauraki Gulf, in particular Ngāti Whanaunga, and it was a traditional area for stonefield gardening. In 1899, settler James Ashby settled on the land, building a kauri homestead with his wife Rebecca in 1900. Ashby developed a lifelong friendship with Ngāti Whanaunga chief Tukumana Te Taniwha. Two pou are found in the regional park, one of which features a carving of James Ashby.

The regional park opened in 1995.

== Gallery ==
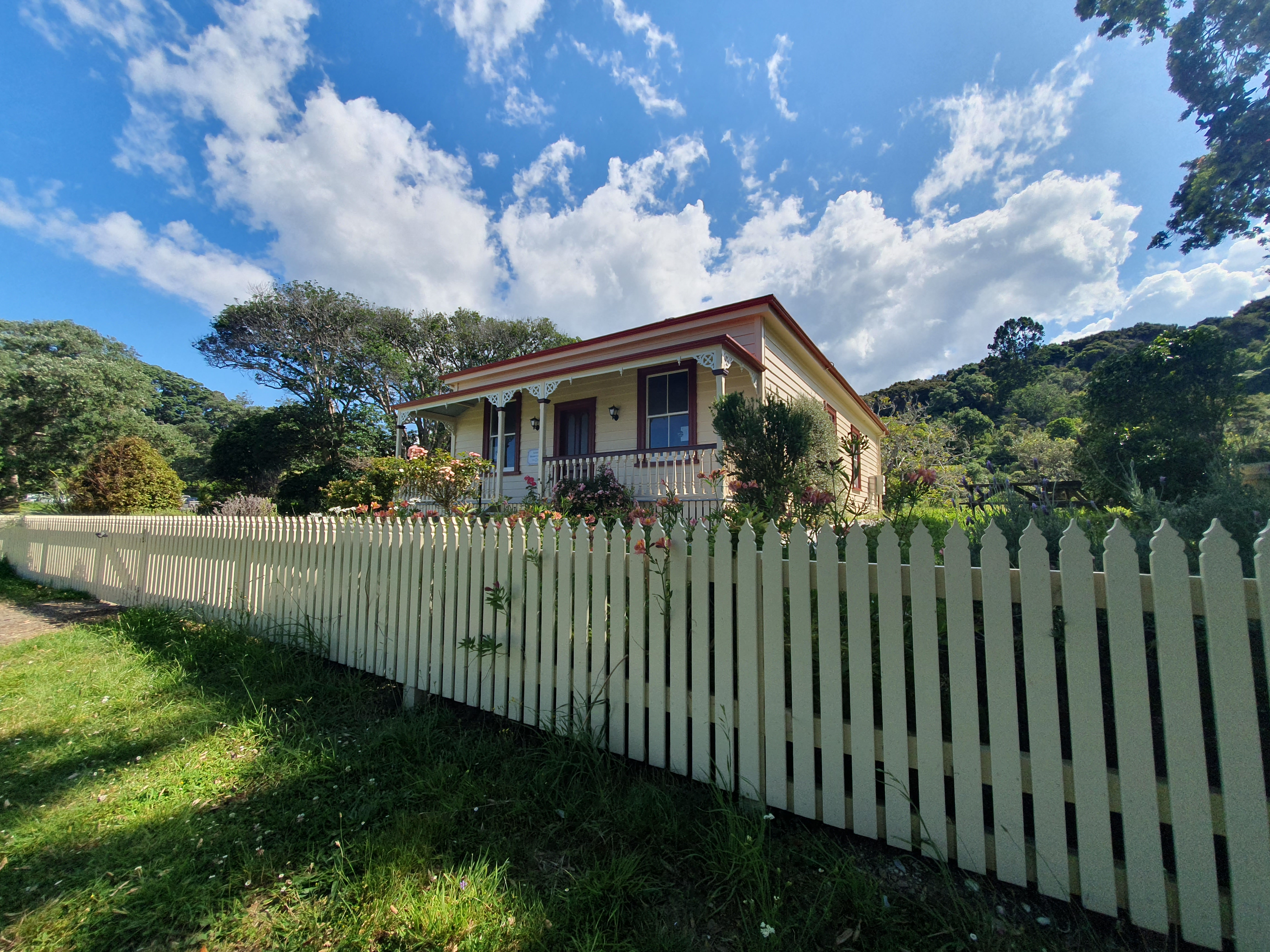
Ashby Homestead

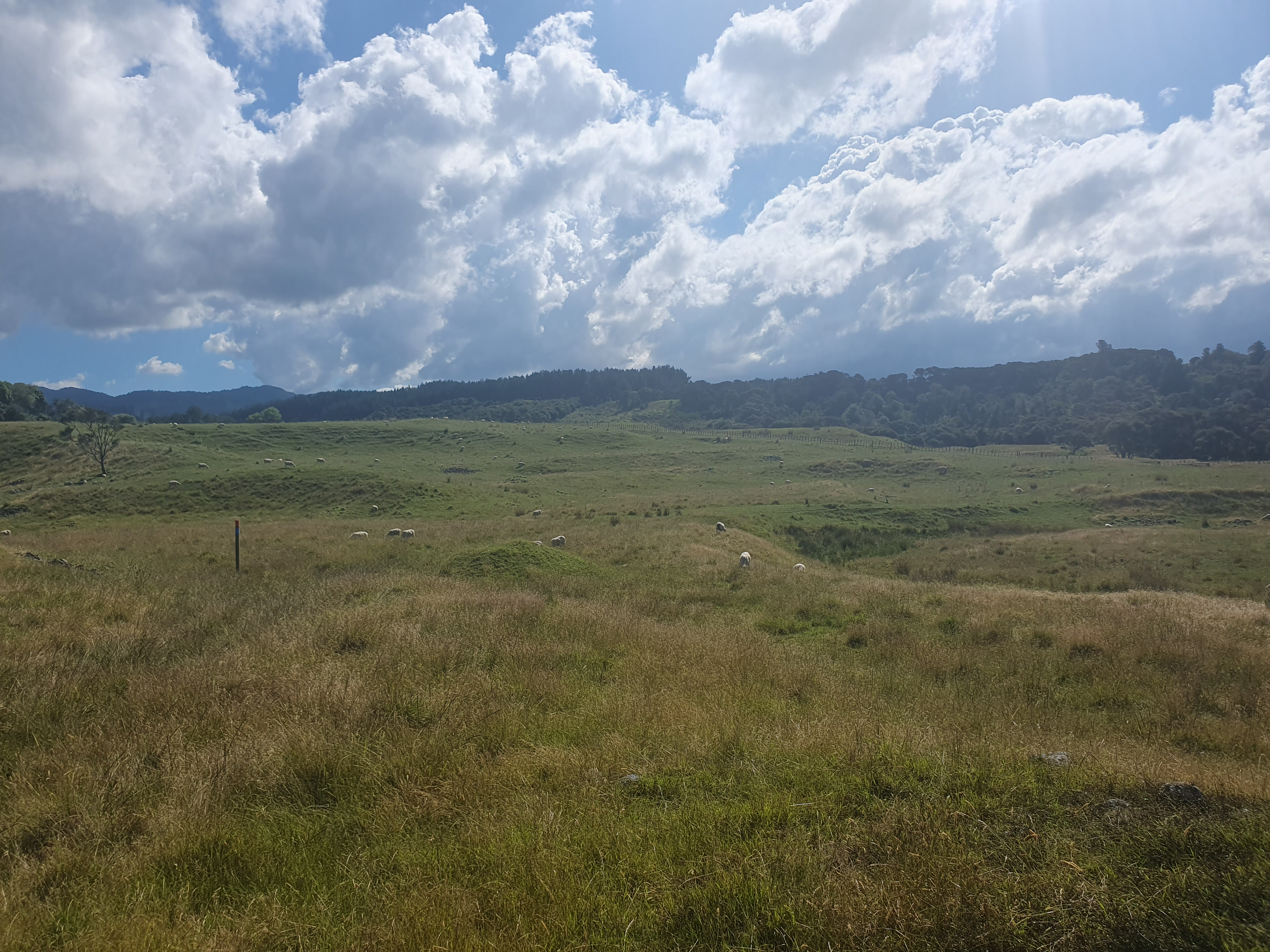
The stonefields at Tāpapakanga

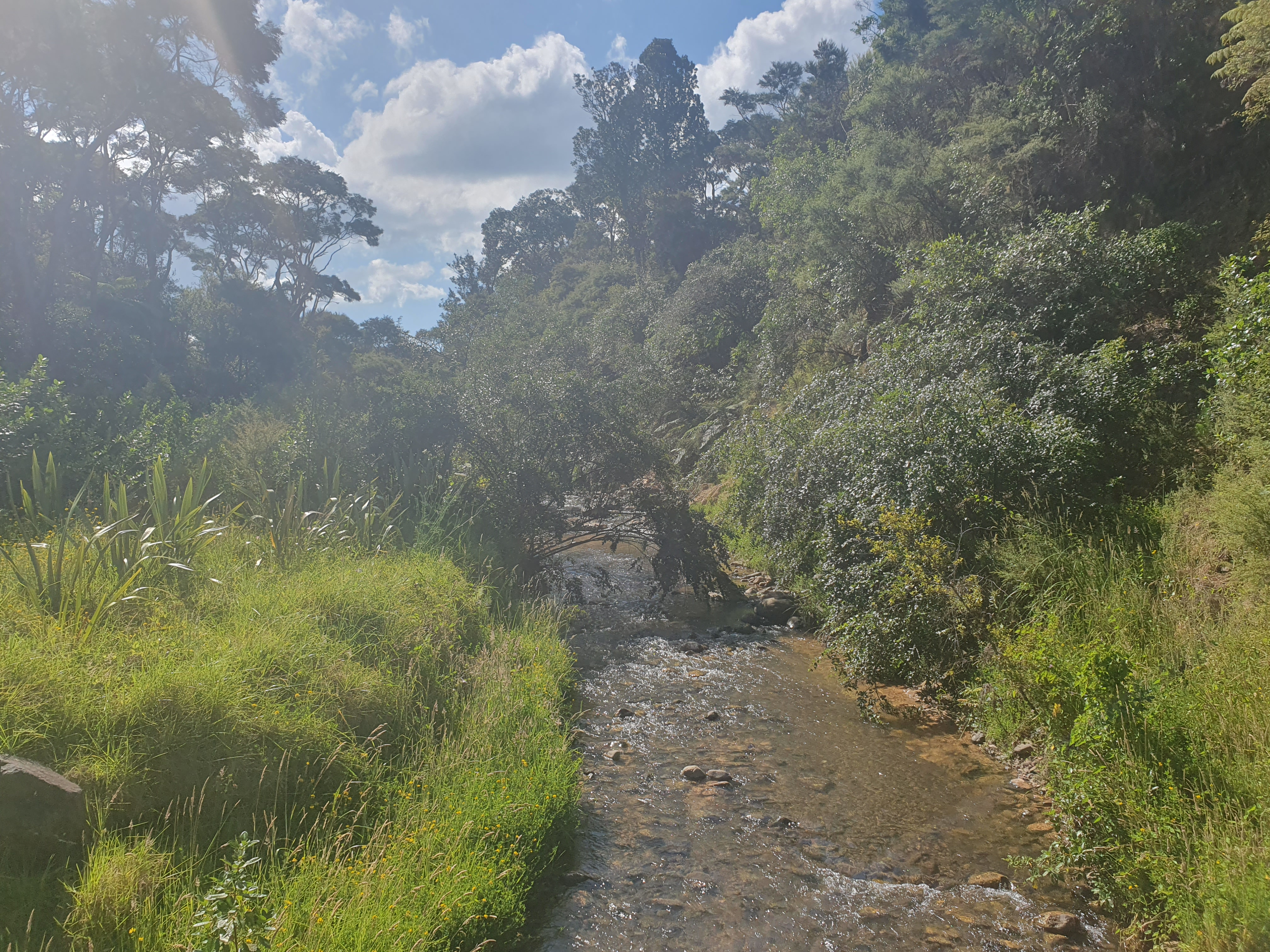
The Tāpapakanga Stream
