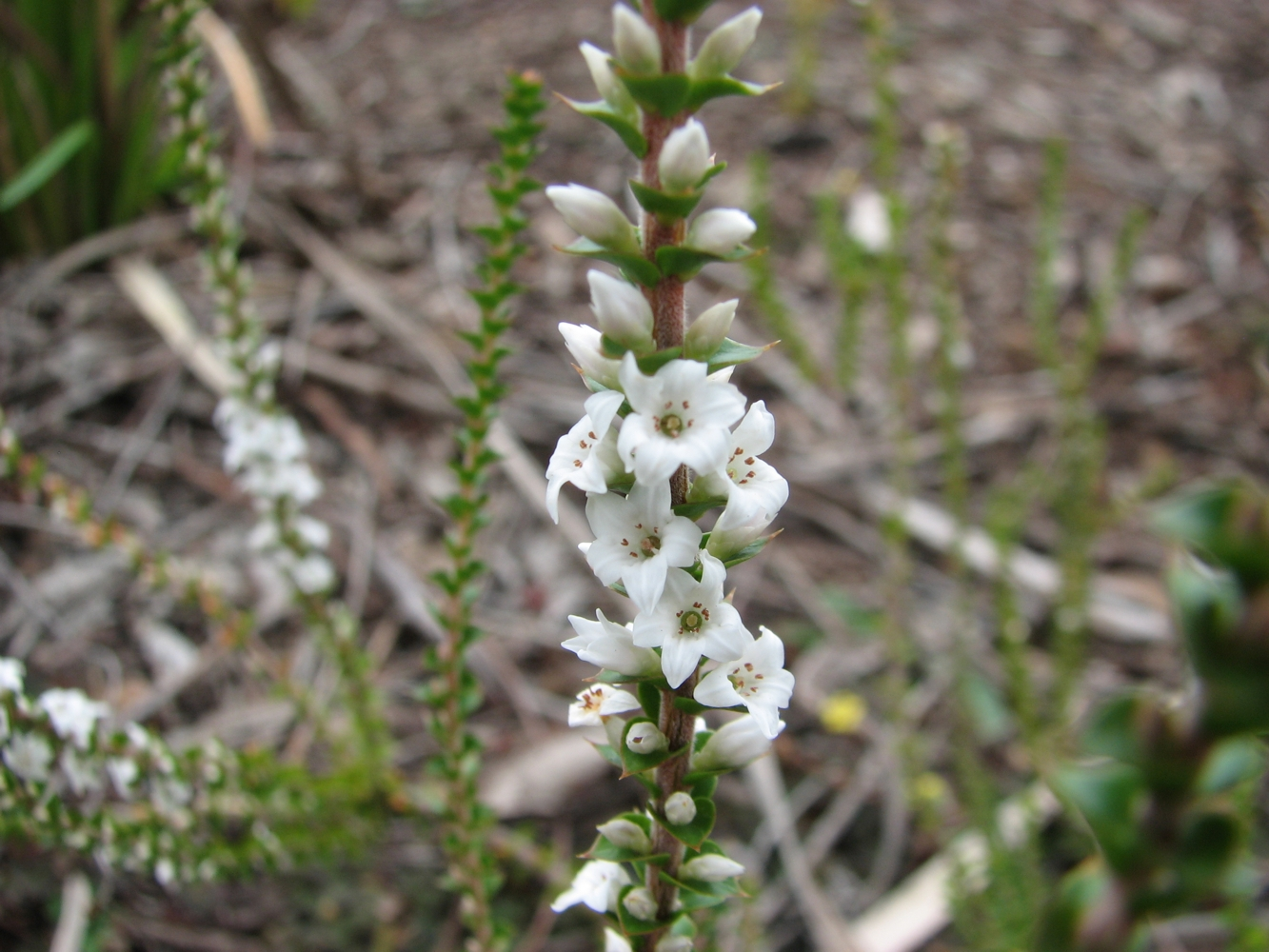
- In Royal Botanic Gardens, Cranbourne

Scientific classification
- Kingdom: Plantae
- Clade: Tracheophytes
- Clade: Angiosperms
- Clade: Eudicots
- Clade: Asterids
- Order: Ericales
- Family: Ericaceae
- Genus: Epacris
- Species: E. gunnii

Binomial name
- Epacris gunnii Hook.f.

Synonyms
- Epacris microphylla var. gunnii (Hook.f.) Benth.

= Epacris gunnii =

Species of flowering plant

Epacris gunnii is a species of flowering plant in the family Ericaceae and is endemic to south-eastern Australia. It is an erect shrub with hairy branchlets, concave, sharply-pointed, broadly egg-shaped leaves, and tube-shaped, white flowers arranged along the stems.

== Description ==
Epacris gunnii is a shrub with a few slender erect branches typically growing to a height of up to about 1 m (3 ft 3 in), the branches softly-hairy. The leaves are glabrous, concave, broadly egg-shaped, 2.0–6.5 mm (0.079–0.256 in) long, 1.8–5.5 mm (0.071–0.217 in) wide, sharply-pointed and evenly-spaced along the branches. The flowers are arranged along 20–30 cm (7.9–11.8 in) of the branches in leaf axils, each flower on a pedicel about 1 mm (0.039 in) long with up to 21 bracts at the base. The sepals are egg-shaped, 2.2–3.0 mm (0.087–0.118 in) long, the petal tube 1.2–2.0 mm (0.047–0.079 in) long with lobes 1.7–2.7 mm (0.067–0.106 in) long, the anthers slightly longer than the petal tube. Flowering occurs from April to October in New South Wales, from September to December in Tasmania. In Victoria, flowering can occur in any month, but from October to February at higher elevations. The fruit is a capsule 1.4–1.8 mm (0.055–0.071 in) in diameter.

== Taxonomy ==
Epacris gunnii was first formally described in 1847 by Joseph Dalton Hooker in the London Journal of Botany, from specimens collected in the "Marlborough and Hampshire Hills" by Gunn and Lawrence.

== Distribution and habitat ==
This epacris grows in forest, heath and grassland, sometime on stream banks and occurs on the coast and tablelands of eastern New South Wales, and mostly in higher places in eastern Victoria and Tasmania. In New South Wales it grows on peaty soils in association with Leptospermum glaucescens, Sprengelia incarnata and Ranunculus species.
