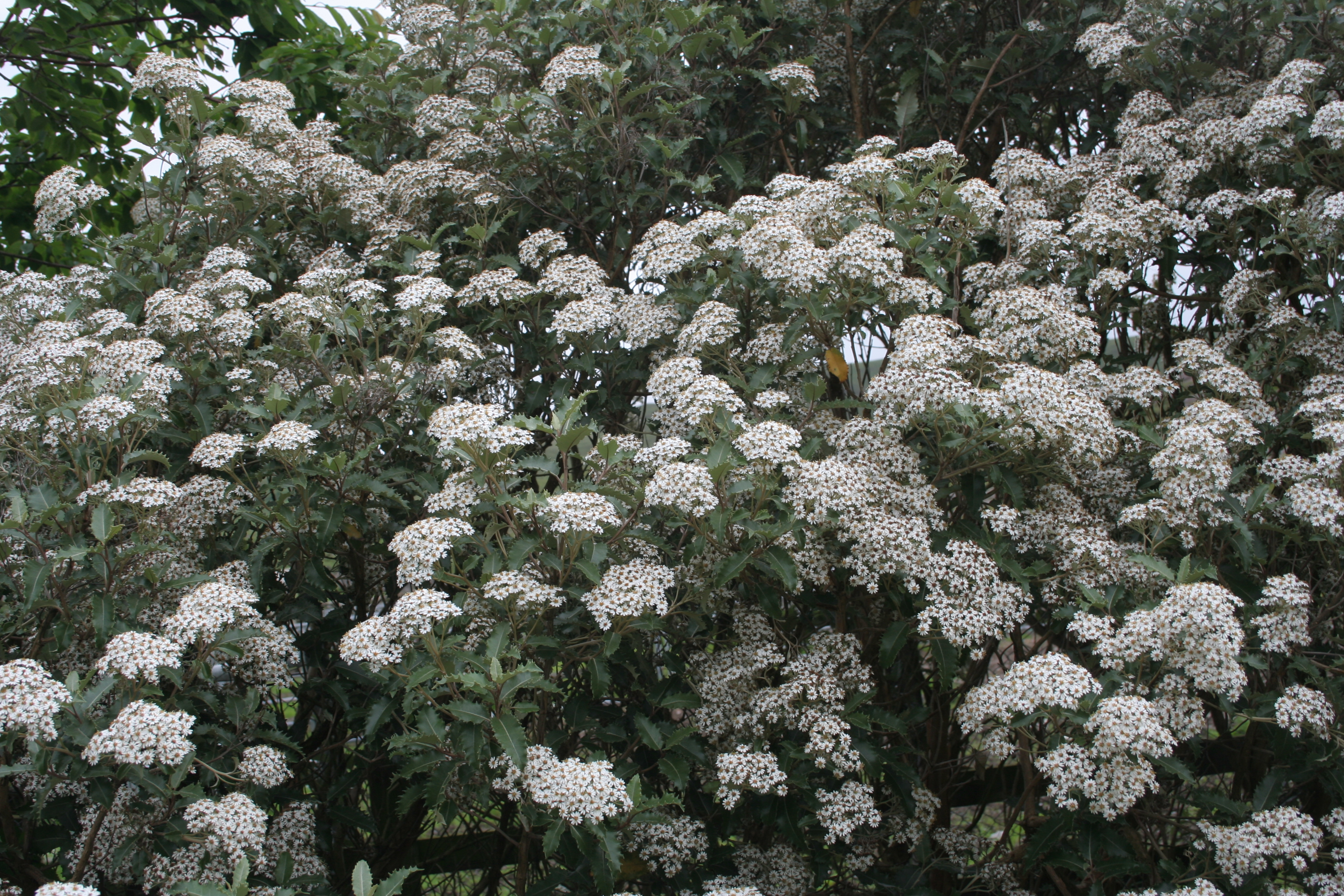

Scientific classification
- Kingdom: Plantae
- Clade: Tracheophytes
- Clade: Angiosperms
- Clade: Eudicots
- Clade: Asterids
- Order: Asterales
- Family: Asteraceae
- Genus: Olearia
- Species: O. macrodonta

Binomial name
- Olearia macrodonta Baker

Synonyms
- Olearia dentata Hook.f.

= Olearia macrodonta =

Species of tree

Olearia macrodonta (mountain holly or arorangi in New Zealand, or New Zealand holly elsewhere) is a small sub-alpine evergreen tree endemic to New Zealand, from the plant family Asteraceae. It is closely related to the narrow-leaved Olearia ilicifolia, with which it shares several characteristics including largely undulating and serrated grey-green leaves. These common characteristics mean the two species are often confused with one another. It is found in lowland to sub-alpine forests from the East Cape of the North Island of New Zealand southwards throughout the South Island and Stewart Island, at 450–1,200 metres (1,480–3,940 ft) in altitude.

Olearia macrodonta is a shrub to spreading small tree that grows 1.5–6 metres (4 ft 11 in – 19 ft 8 in) tall. Its leaves are 5–10 centimetres (2.0–3.9 in) long, 2.5–4 cm (0.98–1.57 in) wide, with undulating and coarsely serrated margins, greyish green above. Its daisy-like composite flowers are white with yellow centres and grow in large, rounded, much-branched corymbs.

Despite its common name, O. macrodonta is not closely related to the true hollies Ilex. The specific epithet macrodonta means "large-toothed", referring to the leaves.

This plant has gained the Royal Horticultural Society's Award of Garden Merit.
