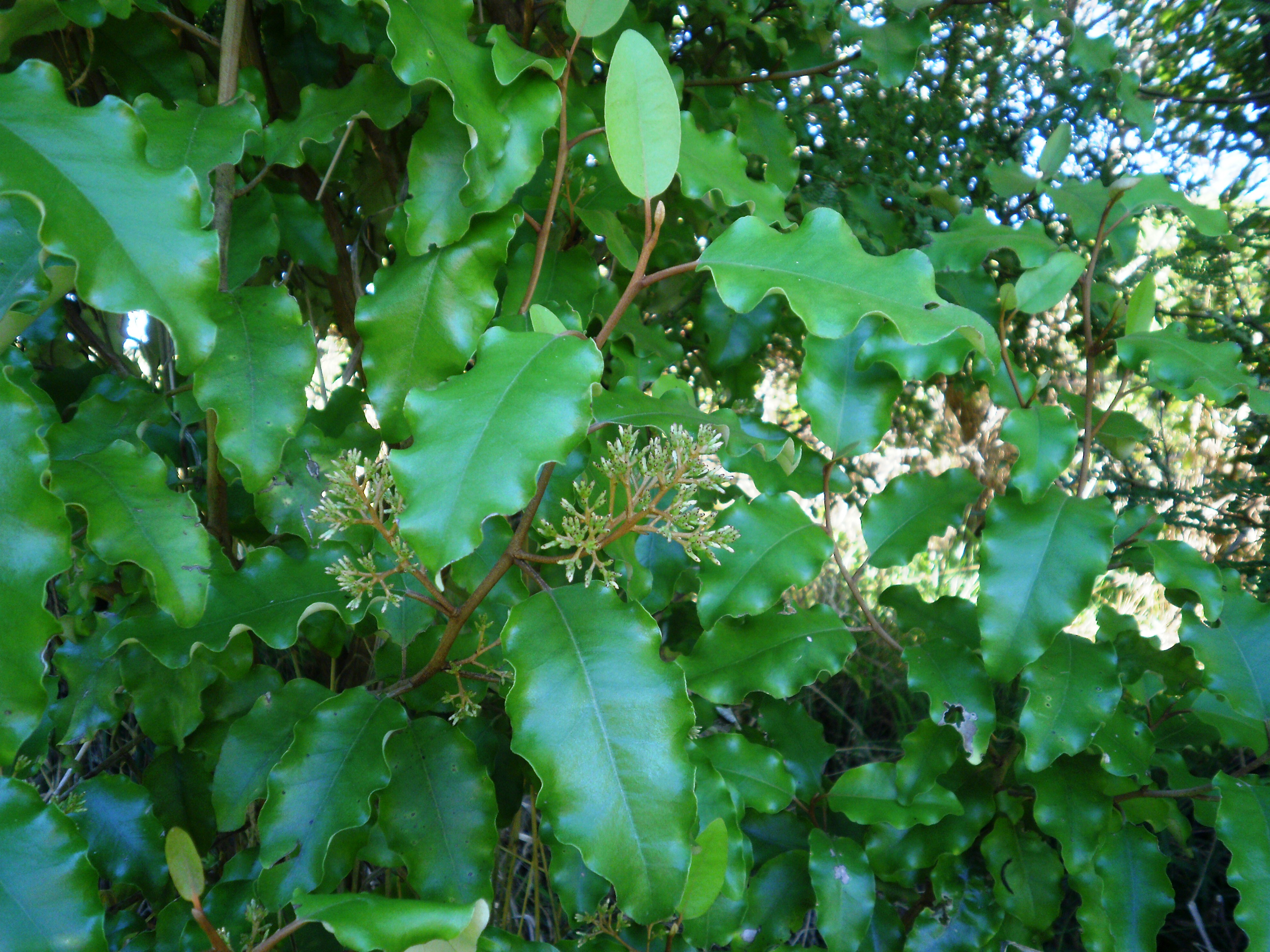

Scientific classification
- Kingdom: Plantae
- Clade: Tracheophytes
- Clade: Angiosperms
- Clade: Eudicots
- Clade: Asterids
- Order: Asterales
- Family: Asteraceae
- Genus: Shawia
- Species: S. paniculata

Binomial name
- Shawia paniculata J.R.Forst. & G.Forst.

Synonyms
- Olearia paniculata (J.R.Forst. & G.Forst.) Druce

= Shawia paniculata =

Species of shrub

Shawia paniculata, commonly called akiraho, is a species of shrub or tree in the family Asteraceae, found only in New Zealand. The tree can grow to 6 metres high, and has yellow-green, oval-shaped leaves, with white undersides and wavy margins.

Shawia paniculata produces clusters of daisy flowers in late autumn.

== Description ==
Shawia paniculata is a small evergreen tree that is indigenous and commonly found in both the North and South Islands of New Zealand. It has reddish twigs bearing very smooth and wavy-edged oval green leaves that are white underneath and twigs that are grooved on the top surface and angular in cross-section. It can grow up to about 6 meters tall. Shawia paniculata branchlets are grooved, sharp-cornered, very short and grow up to short lengths such as 2-4 centimeters. Flowers are small, white, and in dense clusters. Petiole of the akiraho plant which exists as a stalk that attaches the leaf blade to the stem which grows up to 5 millimeters long. It also has a white thin appressed white to buff tomentum below. Shawia paniculata also has a sweet smell to it and is looked at by many people as used for creating hedges. The genus is named after Thomas Shaw, an English scholar and traveller; the specific epithet paniculata means 'tufted', indicating that this species bears flowers in panicles. Shawia paniculata leaf margins can be flat or strongly wavy.

== Range ==
=== Natural global range ===
Shawia paniculata is endemic to both the North and South Islands of New Zealand.

=== New Zealand range ===
Shawia paniculata is a small evergreen tree that is indigenous and commonly found in both the North and South Islands of New Zealand. It can be found in the East Cape to south Canterbury. It is not native to Taranaki but can be seen growing rapidly as a hedge plant.

== Habitat ==
Shawia paniculata is most likely to be found in non-local seed sources. The habitat includes a large amount of grass (c. 50% cover), with c. 3-m-tall plantings in clumps up to 5 m2. Akiraho is also commonly found around other shrubs, herbs, and ferns that are common on the forest floor. It is suited to dry soils and windy places which make it common in coastal areas. This species is not found in the naturally regenerating mature forest. Prefers full sun to partial shade with well-draining soil. Coastal conditions and dry windy situations, so it does not drown and kill the plant. It also tolerates moderate frosts but does not tolerate saturated soils.

== Ecology ==
=== Life cycle/phenology ===
Shawia paniculata produces clusters of daisy flowers in late autumn. Akiraho is a plant that grows well after autumn rains as the soil is preferably soft and moist and warm which allows it to become well established before the winter season. Akiraho goes into the flowering stage between the months of March and May and goes into the fruiting stage between the months of April and July.

=== Predators, parasites, and diseases ===
Shawia paniculata has no known pests or diseases. Goats, cattle and sheep will sometimes eat the leaves.

== Cultivation ==
Shawia paniculata the evergreen shrub or tree, does need water to grow but not too much water. With the leaf density of the evergreen plant, it can be important in promoting durability, water conservation, and protection from predators. The kinds of soil Shawia paniculata prefer is the soil after the autumn season rains as during this stage the soil is moist and warm which is just good for the species because it allows it to establish. It is important to plant Shawia paniculata into slightly raised beds of well-cultivated soil. Because this will create drainage that provides near-surface roots with aerated soil in which to grow. Like all other young plants, they require thorough watering during dry times over the first two or four years mulching which helps to better conserve moisture and suppress weeds. Often when Shawia paniculata is mixed with coarse sand, compost, or organic material it improves the soil's health and moisture structure. When planting Akiraho it is essential to ensure the root ball is saturated and when digging the hole make sure it is twice the diameter of the root ball and watered once being planted.

== Other information ==
Akiraho plant has sweet-smelling flowers. Pruning is not normally required unless it is being planted as a hedge, when it will require regular trimming.
