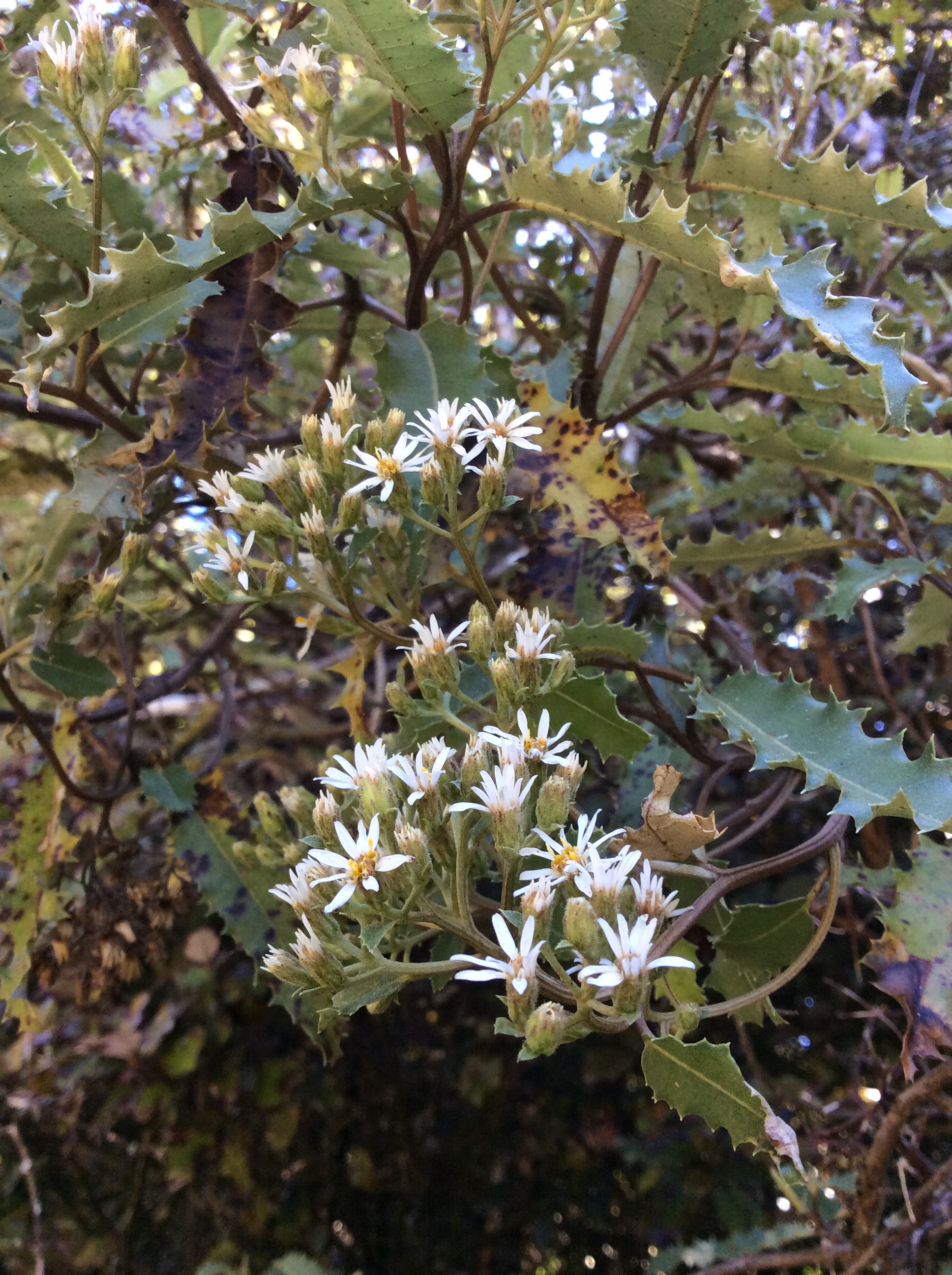

Scientific classification
- Kingdom: Plantae
- Clade: Tracheophytes
- Clade: Angiosperms
- Clade: Eudicots
- Clade: Asterids
- Order: Asterales
- Family: Asteraceae
- Genus: Olearia
- Species: O. ilicifolia

Binomial name
- Olearia ilicifolia Hook.f.

= Olearia ilicifolia =

Species of shrub

Olearia ilicifolia is a shrub or small tree endemic to New Zealand. Common names include: Māori-holly, mountain holly, hakeke or hākēkeke and New Zealand holly. It is a spreading shrub or small tree of the family Asteraceae, and has largely serrated and undulating grey-green leaves. It is closely related to the sub-alpine Olearia macrodonta, with which it shares the names mountain holly and New Zealand holly, however it is much more common than Olearia macrodonta.

== Description ==
Mountain holly is a much-branching, spreading shrub to small tree that grows 1.5–4.6 metres (4 ft 11 in – 15 ft 1 in) tall. Its leaves are 5–10 centimetres (2.0–3.9 in) long, 1–2 cm (0.39–0.79 in) wide, with undulating and coarsely serrated margins, greyish green above. Its flowers are white with yellow centres and grow in large terminal corymbs.

== Distribution and habitat ==
It is endemic to New Zealand and grows in the South Island, Stewart Island, and the North Island south of the Pukeamaru Range near East Cape and the Herangi Range in South Waikato. It is found in lowland and sub-alpine forests from sea level to 1,200 metres (3,900 ft).

== Parasites ==
The larvae of the New Zealand endemic moth species Stigmella erysibodea mines the leaves of O. ilicifolia.
