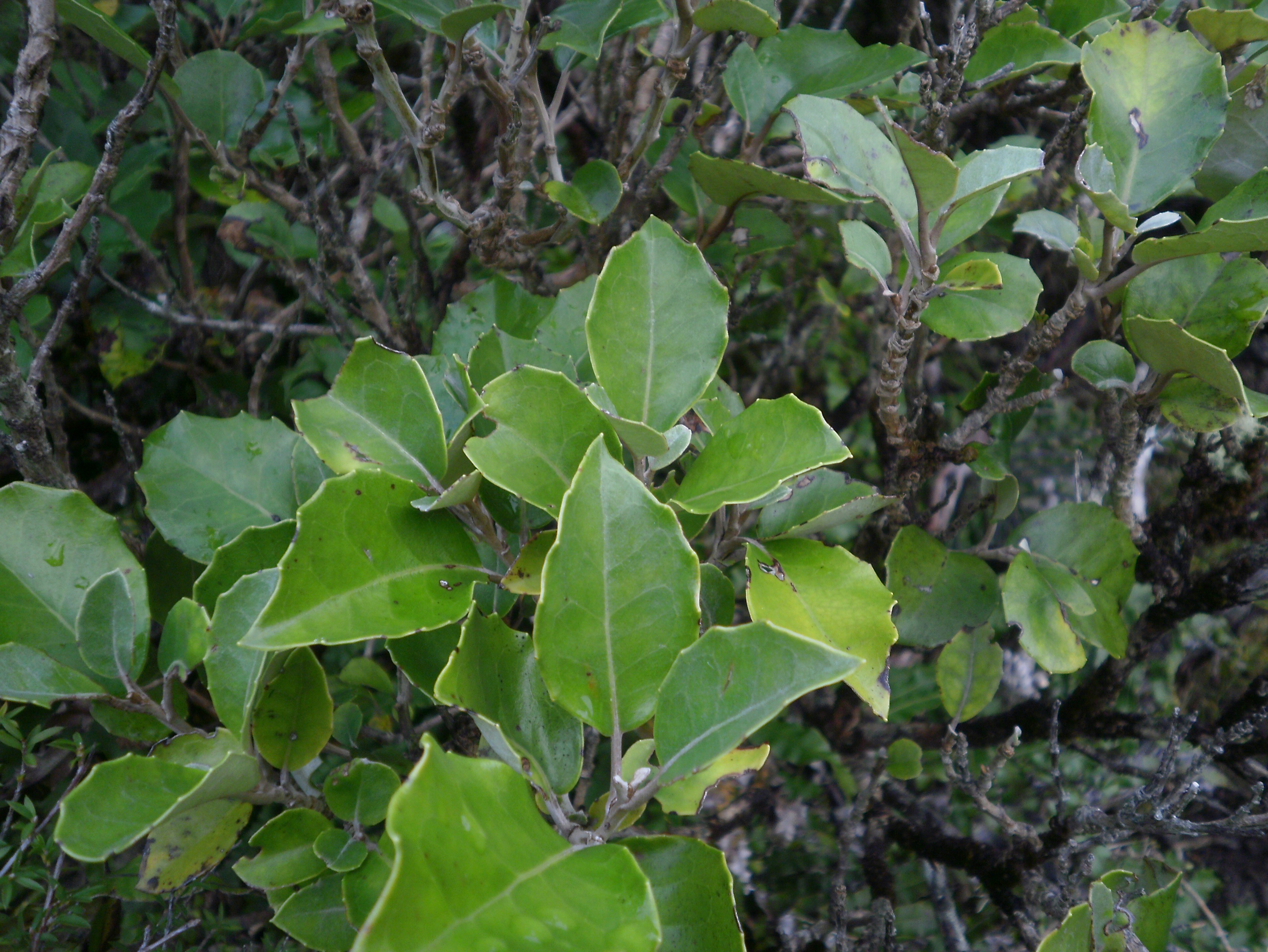

Scientific classification
- Kingdom: Plantae
- Clade: Tracheophytes
- Clade: Angiosperms
- Clade: Eudicots
- Clade: Asterids
- Order: Asterales
- Family: Asteraceae
- Genus: Shawia
- Species: S. arborescens

Binomial name
- Shawia arborescens (G.Forst.) Sch.Bip.

Synonyms
- Synonymy: Aster arborescens (G.Forst.) Kuntze; Aster populifolius (Colenso) Kuntze; Aster suborbiculatus (Colenso) Kuntze; Dectis arborescens (G.Forst.) Raf.; Eurybia alpina Lindl. & Paxton; Eurybia nitida Hook.f.; Olearia arborescens (G.Forst.) Cockayne & Laing; Olearia erythropappa Colenso; Olearia multiflora Colenso; Olearia nitida Hook.f.; Olearia populifolia Colenso; Olearia suborbiculata Colenso; Solidago arborescens G.Forst; Steiractis arborescens (G.Forst.) DC.

= Shawia arborescens =

Species of tree

Shawia arborescens, also known as common tree daisy and pekapeka by Māori, is a common shrub or small tree of New Zealand. It has also been called the Glossy Tree Daisy and the Forest Tree Daisy. It grows in lowland to alpine scrubland in the North Island from East Cape southwards, and throughout the South and Stewart Islands.

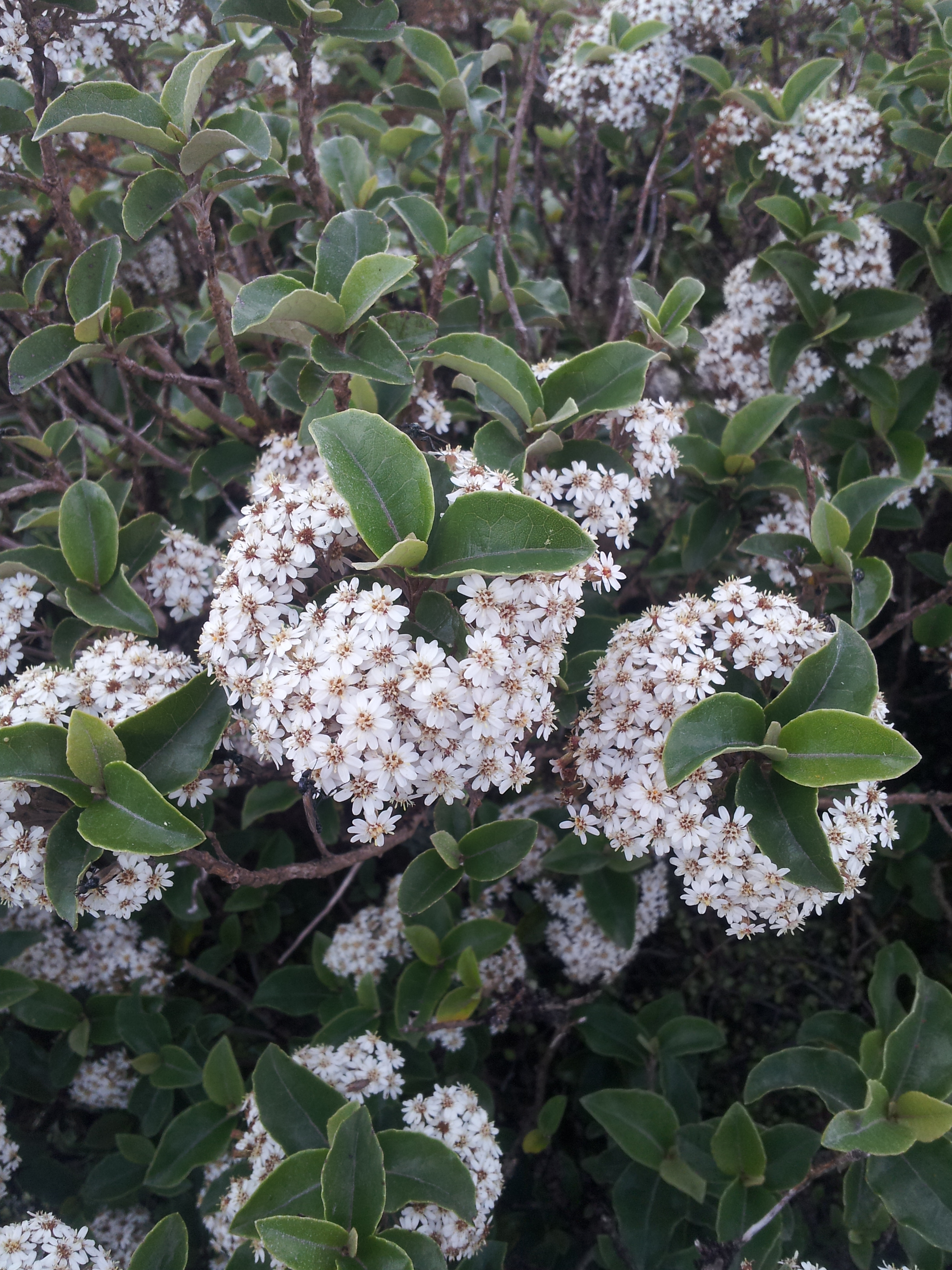
Shawia arborescens in flower

== Description ==
The Common Tree Daisy is a woody bush/tree-like plant. It has dark green leaves with a light greyish underside. The leaves also display a glossy coat. They usually measure between 4–8 cm long. Olearia arborescens has 2 cm long petioles. The plant grows to around 4 metres tall. The leaves show pinnate leaf venation, with a smooth leaf margin. They are also arranged in a simple formation. When the plant flowers, clusters of white florets form. These flowers have small fluffy yellow heads. These white flowers develop fluffy seeds that are wind-dispersed. There are around 15–20 florets of the white and yellow flowers in each cluster. These clusters form almost spherical shapes. The inner pappus of the flower has hairs up to 5 mm long.

The number of chromosomes present in a 2n diploid cell is recorded at 108, meaning that a haploid cell will contain half this number, 54.

== Taxonomy and naming ==
The species was first described as Solidago arborescens by Georg Forster in 1786. The specific epithet “arborescens” means “tree forming” or “tree-like.” The scientific naming of Olearia arborescens took from 1846 to 1911. These scientific names varied greatly from each other. The first name that was given to the Common Tree Daisy was Steiractis arborescens by Augustin de Candolle in 1836. The name changed a further ten times before it was given the name Olearia arborescens by Cockayne and Laing. This indecisiveness shows a clear struggle in identifying what group Olearia arborescens belongs. Leonard Cockayne was one of the two final botanists who named Olearia arborescens. He is a well-known figure in the botany world especially in the Canterbury region where he lived. The “Olearia” of Olearia arborescens was named after Johann Gottfried Olearius who authored Specimen Florae Hallensis. He was a prominent figure in the etymology field in 17th-century Germany.

In the early 21st century the genus Olearia was found to be polyphyletic, the genus Shawia was reinstated, and the name Shawia arborescens, first proposed by Carl Heinrich "Bipontinus" Schultz in 1861, became the accepted species name.

== Range ==
Shawia arborescens is endemic to New Zealand, where it is found in both the North and South Island, predominantly areas in the Southern Alps and central Otago, as well as the Stewart Islands. However, the warmer climates at the top of the North Island, do not seem to be favored by Shawia arborescens.

== Habitat ==
Shawia arborescens lives in lowland areas or alpine shrubland. Predominantly those in mountainous areas like the Southern Alps, or lowland areas like beach forests. These areas predominantly have extreme climates as well as in some instances strong competition with other plants such as grasses and other shrubs. The alpine areas are considered to be isolated areas of flora and fauna diversity. Alpine areas provide a challenge for their inhabitants, with high wind levels, short growing seasons, and poor sunlight levels, all are prominent in Shawia arborescens’ lifespan. Beech forests and lowland areas provide the challenge of sunlight for the Common Tree daisy due to shading out by larger plants, as well as water availability. The Department of Conservation surveyed an area and found Shawia arborescens in riparian areas. These riparian areas were in lowland beach forests. The Common Tree Daisy was only found beside bodies of water like creeks in this study. However, Shawia arborescens only seems to tolerate these low-lying areas, with alpine locations more favored.

== Ecology ==
=== Life cycle and phenology ===
Shawia arborescens flowers from around October to January, running from mid-spring to mid-summer. These flowers turn into fruit from December to March. It has winged seeds that come from their white flowers. These wings aid in the wind-blown distribution of the seeds. Success in the plantings of Shawia seedlings in a Landcare Research trial shows us that seeds germinate around October. Shawia seeds are able to survive in the ground for 9–12 months depending on conditions. This is also accompanied by a very low germination rate which may explain the relative rarity of Shawia arborescens recorded around the country.

=== Diet and foraging ===
Shawia arborescens typically grows in gley soils due to this being the predominant soil in alpine shrublands. Overlaying the raw soil map from Landcare Research onto the iNaturalist sightings shows a correlation. These soils usually contain more nutrients and have a higher biochemical composition than areas like meadows and grasslands. Olearia arborescens also prefers high levels of moisture, such as riparian areas and alpine areas where rainfall can be prolific at times.

=== Predators, parasites and diseases ===
Shawia arborescens was logged as being a non-threatened species from 2004-2017. According to the New Zealand Plant Conservation Network and ither research, Shawia arborescens remains relatively untouched by introduced mammals such as deer, possums, pigs. Shawia arborescens is not considered to be part of their primary food source.

== Intergeneric hybrids ==
A natural hybrid of Shawia arborescens and Celmisia gracilenta was described in 1988 by Clarkson. This hybrid was found on Mount Tarawera on the North Island, continuing the Common Tree Daisy’s preference for montane environments. At that stage, the total hybrids between the Olearia sub-species and Celmisia was now up to four. The report hypothesizes that these hybridization events would be due to intense selection pressures such as the harsh alpine environment inhabited by Shawia arborescens. This hybrid species had different characteristics presenting, such as tailed anthers which are an elongated part of the stamen that contains pollen and undersides of leaves densely covered in hairs. This hybrid was considered to have no evolutionary potential unless the habitat it was located in changes in a way that would allow these new characteristics to give the hybrid a competitive advantage against other species and the ancestral parent species. The report also stated that this hybrid was more closely related to the Celmisia gracilenta than to Shawia arborescens. The hybrid species was described as × Celmearia ruawahia by Peter Brian Heenan in 1993, as S. arborescens was then known as Olearia arborescens. In 2024 Z.H.Feng & Su Liu renamed it × Shawmisia ruawahia, reflecting placement of S. arborescens in genus Shawia.

== Evolution ==
The Common Tree Daisy evolved from a long lineage of plants. Shawia arborescens is one of 15 species descended from a common ancestor. This includes all four species of Commidendrum and Melanodendron integrifolium. The phylogeny also included five species from the Felicia genus which is common to areas in South Africa. The remaining five species were also from the Asteraceae family. This shows that relatives of Shawia arborescens are found throughout the world, including the small, tropical Island of St Helena.
