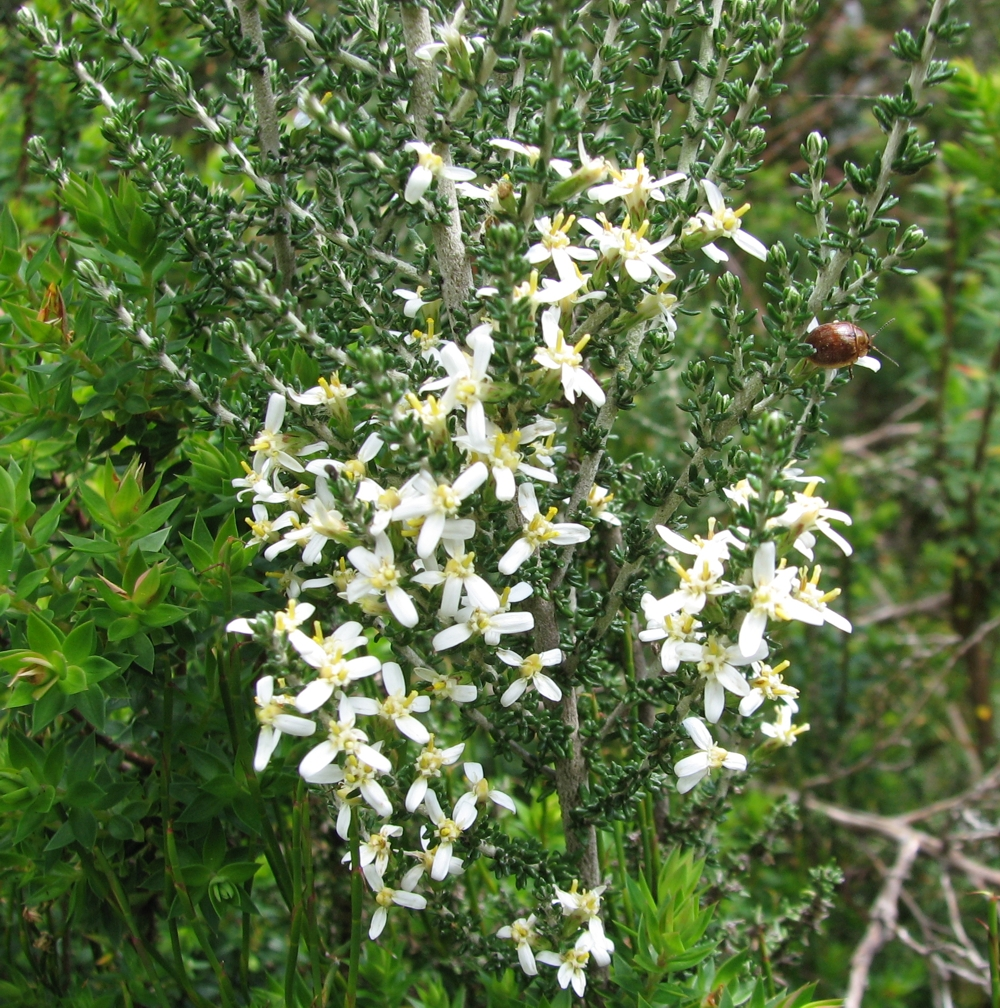
- Olearia algida on Mount Baw Baw

Scientific classification
- Kingdom: Plantae
- Clade: Tracheophytes
- Clade: Angiosperms
- Clade: Eudicots
- Clade: Asterids
- Order: Asterales
- Family: Asteraceae
- Genus: Olearia
- Species: O. algida

Binomial name
- Olearia algida N.A.Wakef.

= Olearia algida =

Alpine daisy-bush

Species of shrub

Olearia algida, the alpine daisy-bush is a species of flowering plant in the family Asteraceae and is endemic to south-eastern Australia. It is a shrub with small, crowded, elliptic to narrow egg-shaped leaves with the narrower end towards the base and heads of white and cream-coloured, daisy-like flowers.

== Description ==
Olearia algida is a bushy shrub that typically grows to a height of 0.7–1 m (2 ft 4 in – 3 ft 3 in) and has cottony-hairy young branchlets. The leaves are arranged alternately and crowded, elliptic to narrow egg-shaped with the narrower end towards the base, 1–3 mm (0.039–0.118 in) long and 0.5–1 mm (0.020–0.039 in) wide with the edges rolled under, the upper surface glabrous but the lower surface woolly-hairy. The daisy-like capitula are arranged singly on the ends of short side-branches and are 7–12 mm (0.28–0.47 in) in diameter. There are two to six white petal-like ray florets with ligules 2.5–5.5 mm (0.098–0.217 in) long, surrounding two to six yellow disc florets. Flowering mainly occurs from October to February and the cypselae are about 1.5 mm (0.059 in) long with bristles about 3 mm (0.12 in) long.

== Taxonomy ==
Olearia algida was first formally described in 1956 by Norman Arthur Wakefield in The Victorian Naturalist from specimens collected by A.J. Tadgell on Mount Bogong in 1922. The specific epithet (algida) is a Latin word meaning "cold".

== Distribution and habitat ==
Alpine daisy-bush grows in heath, shrubland and grassland near swampy places in alpine and subalpine areas south from Mount Gingera in the Australian Capital Territory, through southern New South Wales to eastern Victoria and Tasmania. It is also cultivated in New Zealand.
