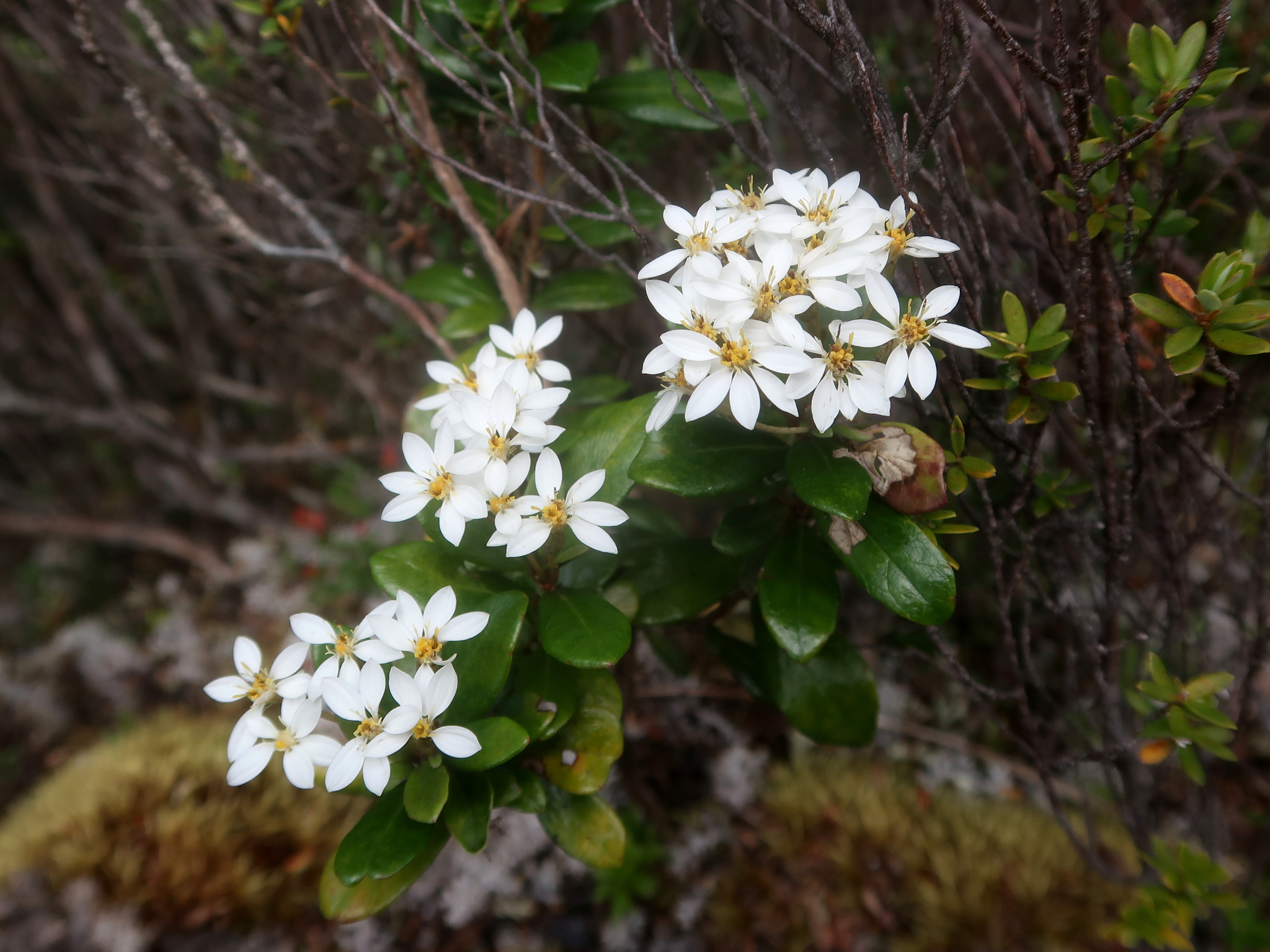
- At Mount Murchison

Scientific classification
- Kingdom: Plantae
- Clade: Tracheophytes
- Clade: Angiosperms
- Clade: Eudicots
- Clade: Asterids
- Order: Asterales
- Family: Asteraceae
- Genus: Shawia
- Species: S. persoonioides

Binomial name
- Shawia persoonioides (DC.) Sch.Bip.
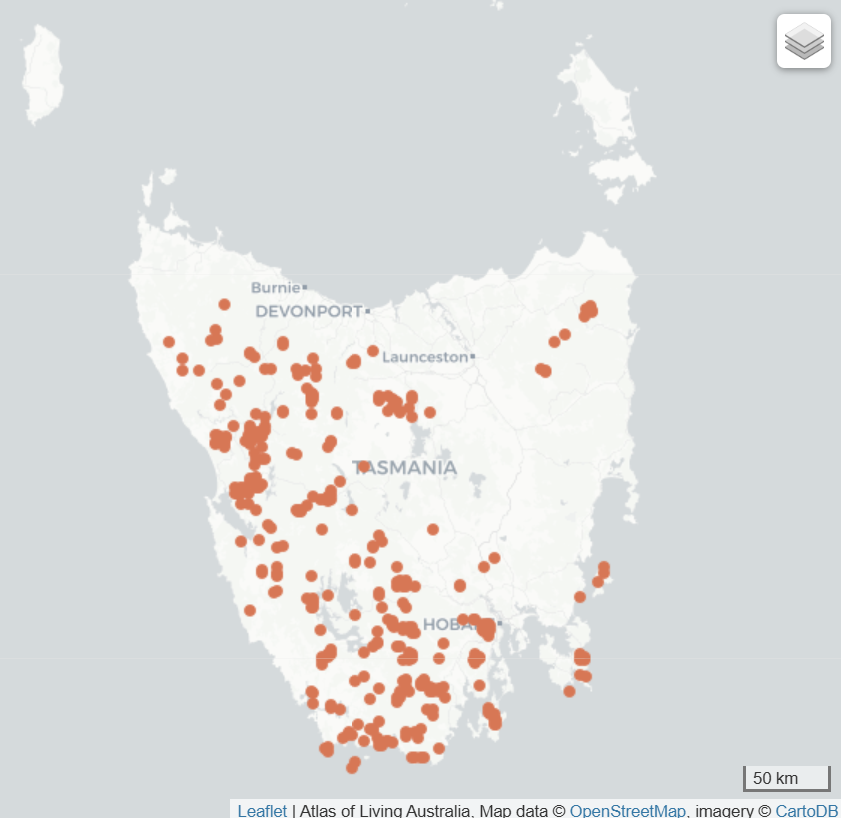

Synonyms
- List: Aster persoonioides A.Cunn. ex DC.; Aster persoonoides F.Muell. orth. var.; Eurybia alpina Hook.f.; Eurybia persoonioides DC.; Eurybia persoonioides var. lanceolata Hook.f.; Olearia alpina (Hook.f.) W.M.Curtis; Olearia lanceolata (Benth.) D.I.Morris; Olearia persoonioides (DC.) Benth.; Olearia persoonioides var. lanceolata Benth.; Shawia alpina (Hook.f.) Sch.Bip.

= Shawia persoonioides =

Species of shrub

Shawia persoonioides is a species of flowering plant in the family Asteraceae and is endemic to Tasmania. It is a shrub with oblong or egg-shaped leaves and heads of dairy-like flowers.

== Description ==
Shawia persoonioides is a bushy shrub that typically grows to a height of 1.0–1.5 m (3 ft 3 in – 4 ft 11 in). Its leaves are arranged alternately, oblong or egg-shaped with the narrower end towards the base, 19–38 mm (0.75–1.50 in) long with a rounded tip. They are shiny green on the upper surface and covered with silvery hairs on the lower side. The heads or daisy-like "flowers" are arranged in leafy panicles with 3 to 8 white ray florets surrounding 10 to 12 disc florets. Flowering occurs in January.

== Taxonomy ==
This species was first formally described in 1836 by Swedish botanist Augustin Pyramus de Candolle who named it Eurybia persoonioides in his book Prodromus Systematis Naturalis Regni Vegetabilis from specimens collected at a height of 4,100 ft (1,200 m) on Mount Wellington. In 1867, the species was transferred to Olearia as O. persoonioides by George Bentham in his Flora Australiensis. After the genus Olearia was found to be polyphyletic, the genus Shawia was reinstated, and the name Shawia persoonioides, first proposed by Carl Heinrich "Bipontinus" Schultz in 1861, became the accepted species name.

=== Similar species ===
About 22 species of formerly or currently placed in Olearia have been recorded in Tasmania. Similar species found in Tasmania include:

- Olearia archeri is found in open forest on the east coast, including the Tasman Peninsula.
- Olearia tasmanica has leaves that are rusty-brown on the lower surface, and grows in subalpine woodlands.

== Distribution and habitat ==
Shawia persoonioides is endemic to Tasmania and is common in most mountainous districts of the state.

== Conservation status ==
This species has not been listed in the International Union for Conservation of Nature Red List.
