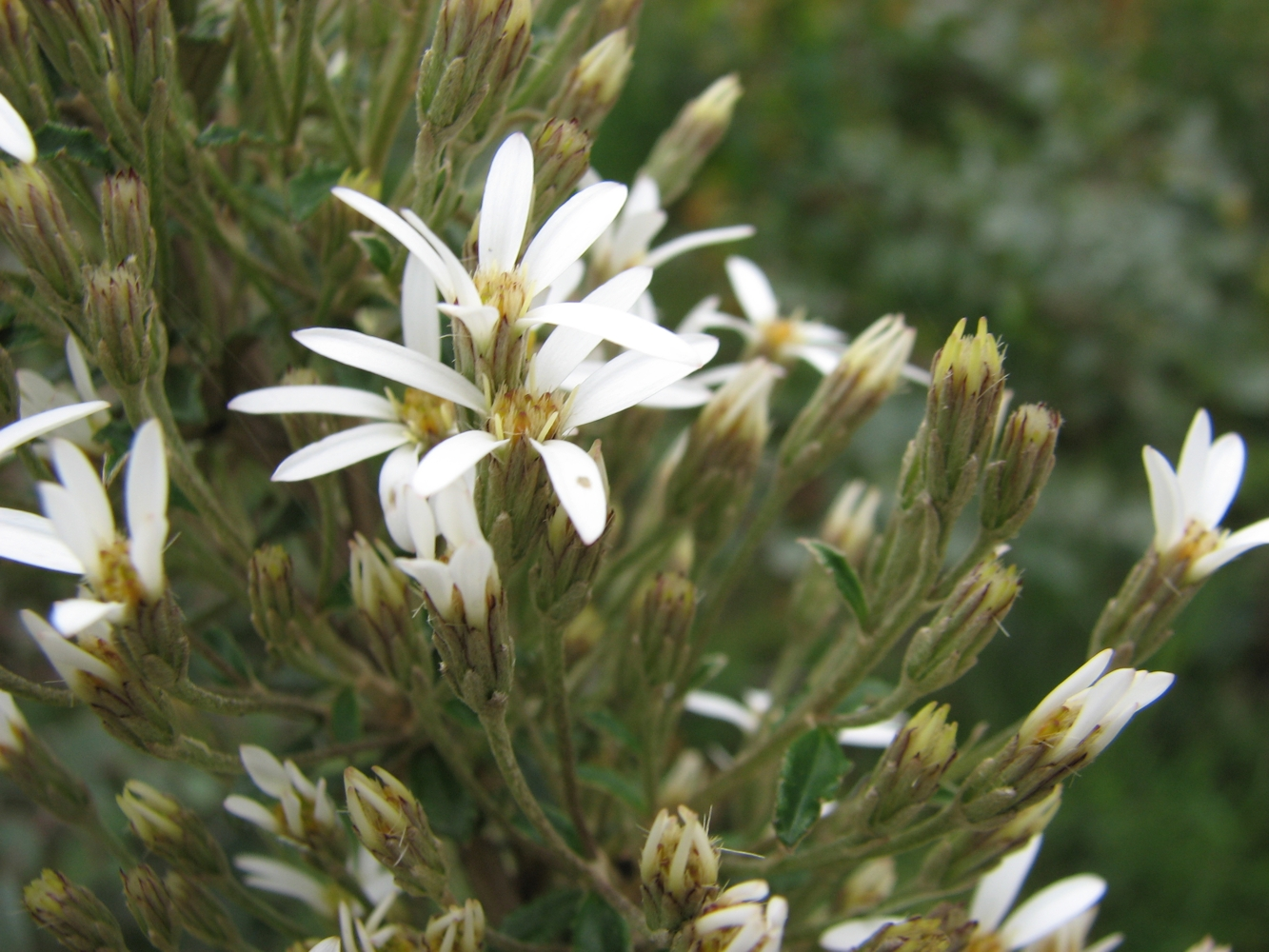
- Shawia erubescens in Kinglake National Park, Victoria

Scientific classification
- Kingdom: Plantae
- Clade: Tracheophytes
- Clade: Angiosperms
- Clade: Eudicots
- Clade: Asterids
- Order: Asterales
- Family: Asteraceae
- Genus: Shawia
- Species: S. erubescens

Binomial name
- Shawia erubescens (Sieber ex Spreng.) Sch.Bip.

Synonyms
- Aster erubescens Sieber ex Spreng.; Eurybia erubescens (Sieber ex Spreng.) DC.; Olearia erubescens (Sieber ex Spreng.) Dippel; Olearia myrsinoides var. erubescens (Sieber ex Spreng.) Benth.

= Shawia erubescens =

Moth daisy-bush

Species of plant

Shawia erubescens, commonly known as moth daisy-bush or pink-tip daisy-bush, is a species of flowering plant in the family Asteraceae. It is a shrub with stiff, prickly leaves and white "daisy" flowers, growing up to 2 metres high.

== Description ==
Shawia erubescens is a spreading woody shrub to 0.5–2 m (1.6–6.6 ft) high and 0.5–1 m (1.6–3.3 ft) wide when growing at lower elevations in grassland and wooded gullies. It has a gnarled smaller growth habit at higher elevations to 40 cm (16 in) high. The branchlets are densely matted with soft whitish T-shaped hairs. The smooth upper leaf surface is dark green, flat and stiff with a distinctive pale network of veins. The leaves are on a short stalk 11 mm (0.43 in) long, arranged alternately, may be either sparse or crowded and end in a sharp point. The leaves are narrowly oval to oblong about 15–125 mm (0.59–4.9 in) long and 3–20 mm (0.12–0.79 in) wide with small, coarse, irregular teeth or slightly lobed serrations along the margin. The leaf underside is thickly covered with white hairs, occasionally reddish when young. The inflorescence consists of 4-8 white flowers, occasionally a pinkish mauve, about 15–31 mm (0.59–1.2 in) in diameter blooming at the end of branches on a peduncle about 1–4 cm (0.39–1.6 in) long. The flower clusters are borne in leaf axils on previous season shoots. The floret centre is yellow. The cone-shaped bracts are arranged in rows of 3-5 and 4.5–7 mm (0.18–0.28 in) long and covered in dense silky flat hairs. The dry fruit is one seeded, narrowly cylindrical 3–4 mm (0.12–0.16 in) long and ribbed. Flowering occurs from September to January.

== Taxonomy and naming ==
Shawia erubescens was first formally described by Franz Sieber as Aster erubescens but he did not publish the description. In 1826 Kurt Sprengel published the description in his book Systema Vegetabilium. The specific epithet (erubescens) is derived from the Latin meaning "grow red", "redden" or "blush" possibly referring to the new growth that is occasionally a reddish colour. Augustin de Candolle published the description Eurybia erubescens in Prodromus Systematis Naturalis Regni Vegetabilis in 1836 but made no reference to Sprengel's prior description of 1826. In 1889 Leopold Dippel described Olearia erubescens and published the description in Handbuch der Laubholzkunde. After the genus Olearia was found to be polyphyletic, the genus Shawia was reinstated, and the name Shawia erubescens, first proposed by Carl Heinrich "Bipontinus" Schultz in 1861, became the accepted species name.

== Distribution and habitat ==
Moth daisy bush is a widespread species on the coast and ranges from the Blue Mountains, west to Orange and Drake in the Northern Tablelands of New South Wales. Also found in South Australia, Victoria and Tasmania. Grows in rocky situations, sclerophyll forests, woodland and montane forests.
