= Erlangea =

Scientific classification
- Kingdom: Plantae
- Clade: Tracheophytes
- Clade: Angiosperms
- Clade: Eudicots
- Clade: Asterids
- Order: Asterales
- Family: Asteraceae
- Subfamily: Cichorioideae
- Tribe: Vernonieae
- Genus: Erlangea; Sch.Bip.

Type species
- Erlangea plumosa Sch.Bip.

Synonyms
- Haarera Hutch. & E.A.Bruce; Stephanolepis S.Moore

Genus of flowering plants

Erlangea is a genus of African flowering plants in the family Asteraceae.

Species

- Erlangea alternifolia (O.Hoffm.) S.Moore
- Erlangea angelinii (Fiori) Cufod.
- Erlangea angolensis (Hiern) S.Moore
- Erlangea calycina S.Moore
- Erlangea centaurioides (S.Moore) S.Moore
- Erlangea chevalieri O.Hoffm. & Muschl.
- Erlangea enigmatica C.Jeffrey
- Erlangea fruticosa C.D.Adams
- Erlangea linearifolia (O.Hoffm.) S.Moore
- Erlangea misera (Oliv. & Hiern) S.Moore
- Erlangea paleacea Chiov.
- Erlangea plumosa Sch.Bip.
- Erlangea remifolia Wild & G.V.Pope
- Erlangea richardsiae (Wech.) C.Jeffrey
- Erlangea schebellensis S.Moore
- Erlangea smithii S.Moore
