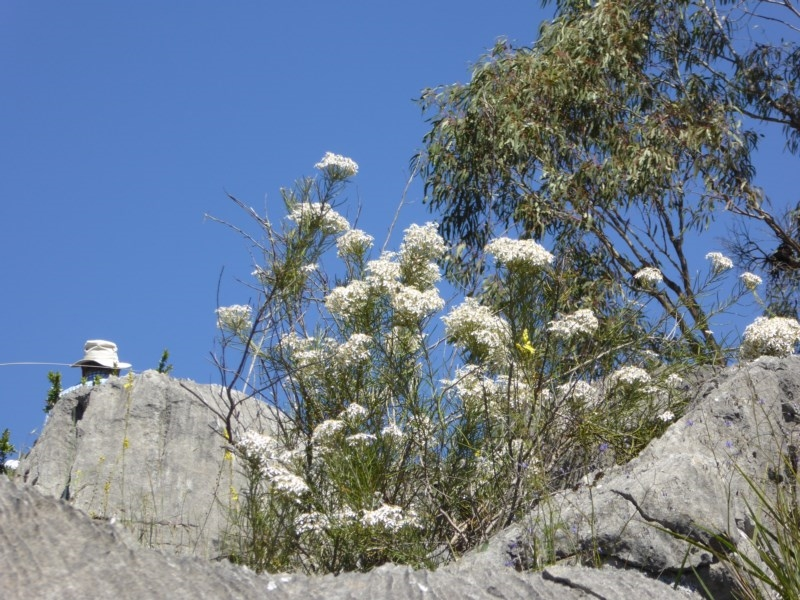
- Near Wee Jasper

Scientific classification
- Kingdom: Plantae
- Clade: Tracheophytes
- Clade: Angiosperms
- Clade: Eudicots
- Clade: Asterids
- Order: Asterales
- Family: Asteraceae
- Genus: Shawia
- Species: S. rosmarinifolia

Binomial name
- Shawia rosmarinifolia (DC.) Sch.Bip.

Synonyms
- Aster rosmarinifolius A.Cunn. ex DC.; Eurybia rosmarinifolia DC.; Olearia rosmarinifolia (DC.) Benth.

= Shawia rosmarinifolia =

Species of plant

Shawia rosmarinifolia is a species of flowering plant in the family Asteraceae and is endemic to eastern Australia. It is a shrub with scattered linear leaves, and white and yellow, daisy-like inflorescences.

== Description ==
Shawia rosmarinifolia is a straggly shrub that typically grows to a height of up to 1.6 m (5 ft 3 in). Its leaves are scattered along the branches, linear, 12–90 mm (0.47–3.54 in) long and 1.5–3.5 mm (0.059–0.138 in) wide with the edges rolled under. The upper surface of the leaves is more or less glabrous, the lower surface covered with greyish, woolly hairs. The heads or daisy-like "flowers" are arranged in corymbs on a peduncle up to 55 mm (2.2 in) and are 16–26 mm (0.63–1.02 in) in diameter with 5 to 7 white ray florets, surrounding 8 to 21 yellow disc florets. Flowering occurs from October to December and the fruit is a glabrous achene, the pappus with 60 to 84 bristles.

== Taxonomy ==
This daisy was first formally described in 1836 by Augustin Pyramus de Candolle who gave it the name Eurybia rosmarinifolia in his Prodromus Systematis Naturalis Regni Vegetabilis from specimens collected near Bathurst. The specific epithet (rosmarinifolia) means "Rosmarinus-leaved". In 1867, George Bentham changed the name to Olearia rosmarinifolia in Flora Australiensis. After the genus Olearia was found to be polyphyletic, the genus Shawia was reinstated, and the name Shawia rosmarinifolia, first proposed by Carl Heinrich "Bipontinus" Schultz in 1861, became the accepted species name.

== Distribution and habitat ==
Shawia rosmarinifolia grows in rocky sites near rivers and in gorges from south-east Queensland and south to near Cooma in southern New South Wales.
