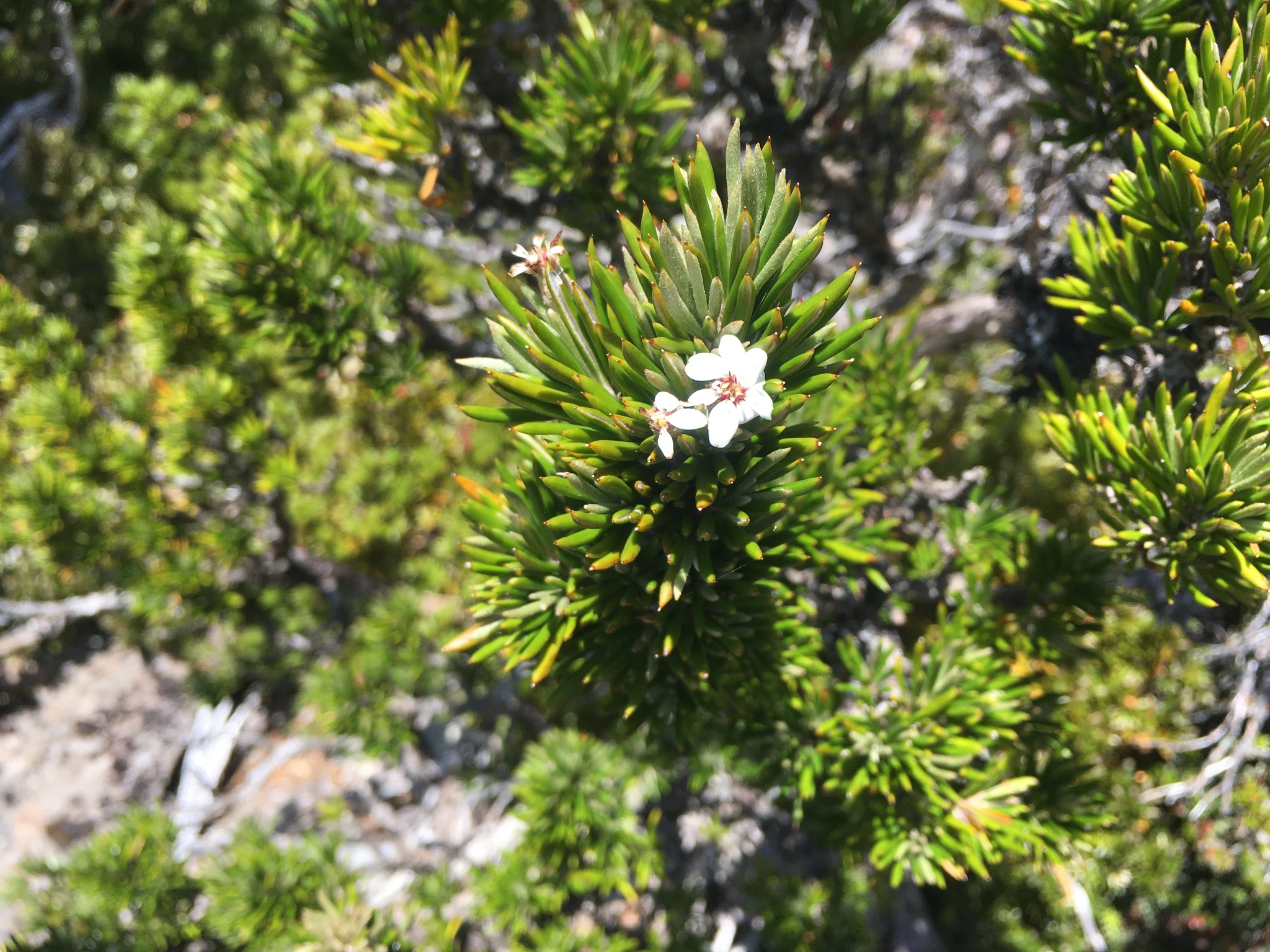
- In Mount Field National Park
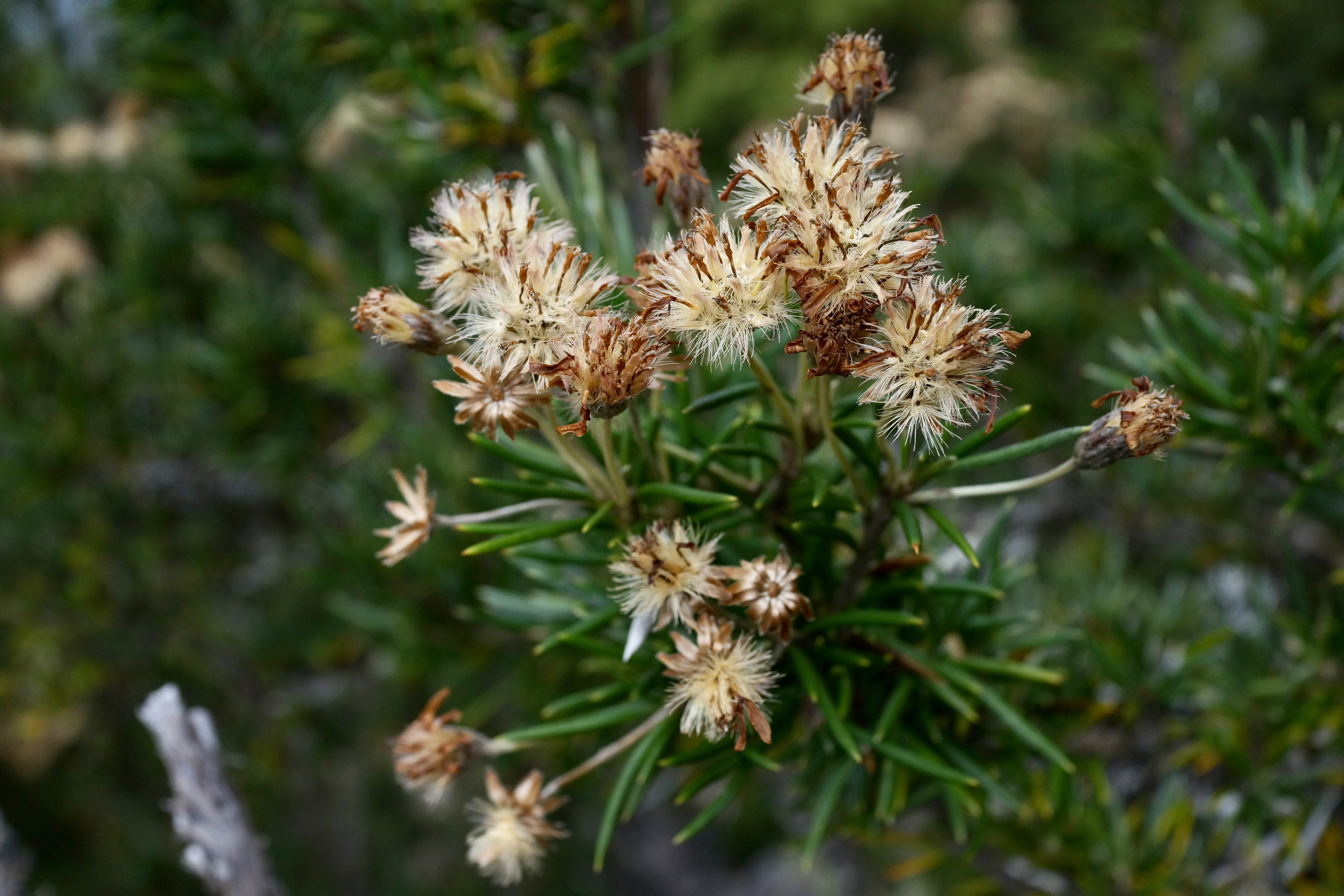
- Close-up of fruit on kunanyi

Scientific classification
- Kingdom: Plantae
- Clade: Tracheophytes
- Clade: Angiosperms
- Clade: Eudicots
- Clade: Asterids
- Order: Asterales
- Family: Asteraceae
- Genus: Shawia
- Species: S. pinifolia

Binomial name
- Shawia pinifolia (Hook.f.) Sch.Bip.
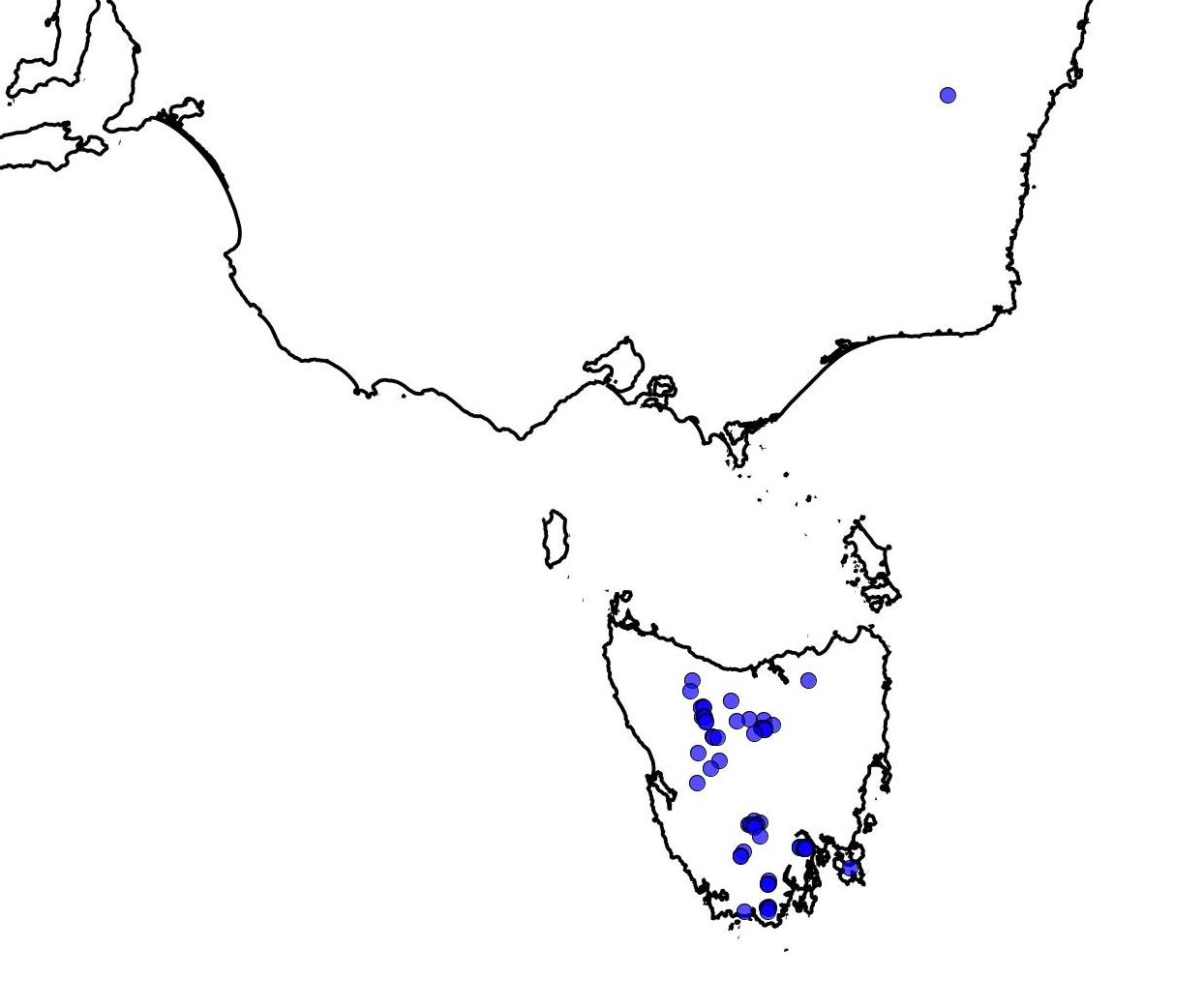
- Shawia pinifolia distribution map

Synonyms
- Aster pinifolius (Hook.f.) F.Muell. nom. illeg.; Eurybia pinifolia Hook.f.; Olearia pinifolia (Hook.f.) Benth.

= Shawia pinifolia =

Species of shrub

Shawia pinifolia, commonly known as the pine-daisy, is a species of flowering plant in the family Asteraceae which is endemic to Tasmania. It is a shrub with rigid, linear, sharply-pointed leaves and white and yellow, daisy-like inflorescences.

== Description ==
Shawia pinifolia is a rigid, bushy shrub that typically grows to a height of 1.5 m (4 ft 11 in) and has stout, woolly-hairy branches. The leaves are arranged alternately along the branches, crowded, narrowly linear and 25–38 mm (0.98–1.50 in) long. The leaves are rigid and sharply-pointed with the edges rolled under, giving the plant a pine-like appearance. They are glabrous on the upper surface and silky-hairy on the obsured lower surface. The heads or daisy-like "flowers" are mostly arranged singly on the end of a long peduncle and have a top-shaped involucre. Each "flower" has 8 to 10 white ray florets surrounding a larger number of yellow disc florets. The achenes are long, narrow and smooth, the pappus with bristles in several rows.

== Taxonomy ==
The species was first formally described in 1847 by Joseph Dalton Hooker who gave it the name Eurybia pinifolia in the London Journal of Botany from specimens collected by Ronald Campbell Gunn. The specific epithet (pinifolia) means "pine-leaved". In 1867, George Bentham changed the name to Olearia pinifolia in Flora Australiensis. After the genus Olearia was found to be polyphyletic, the genus Shawia was reinstated, and the name Shawia pinifolia, first proposed by Carl Heinrich "Bipontinus" Schultz in 1861, became the accepted species name.

== Distribution and habitat ==
Shawia pinifolia is common in alpine or subalpine regions of Tasmania, including on Mount Wellington, Mount Dundas, Mount Sorell and Mount Field.

== Ecology ==
This species is known to be resistant to Phytophthora cinnamomi which can cause root rot. It may be susceptible to mealybug which feed on the juices of the plant, and may carry other diseases.

== Use in horticulture ==
Seeds can be collected from seeding Shawia pinifolia in the late summer to early autumn (January-March), when the plant releases the fluffy, white achenes. These can be collected and dried, and if sowed within a short time in a surface layer of loamy, low-phosphorus soil, can yield young S. pinifolia seedlings. Best sowing months in Tasmania are March-April and October-November, when conditions are mild and frosts rare. Germination occurs in two to five weeks after planting. Plants may also be propagated from cuttings taken from healthy, young specimens.
