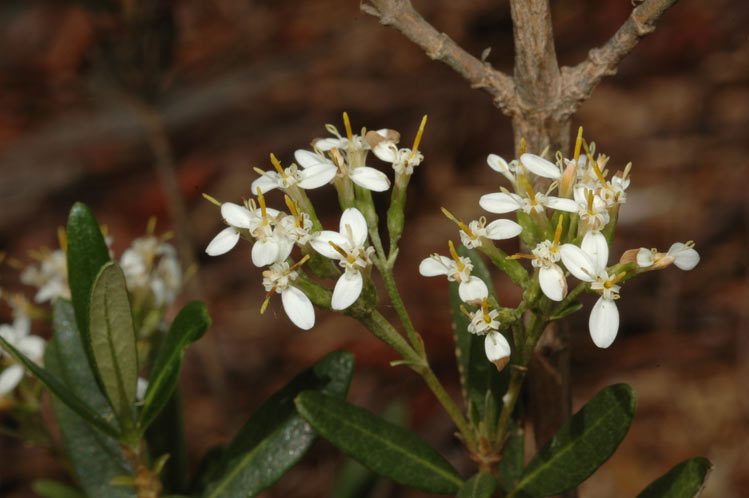
- In the Australian National Botanic Gardens

Scientific classification
- Kingdom: Plantae
- Clade: Tracheophytes
- Clade: Angiosperms
- Clade: Eudicots
- Clade: Asterids
- Order: Asterales
- Family: Asteraceae
- Genus: Shawia
- Species: S. viscosa

Binomial name
- Shawia viscosa (Labill.) Sch.Bip.

Synonyms
- Aster viscosus Labill.; Eurybia viscosa (Labill.) Cass.; Haxtonia viscosa (Labill.) D.Don; Olearia viscosa (Labill.) Benth.

= Shawia viscosa =

Species of plant

Shawia viscosa is a species of flowering plant in the family Asteraceae and which is native to Tasmania and Victoria in south-eastern Australia. It is a bushy shrub with lance-shaped, egg-shaped or elliptic leaves arranged in opposite pairs, and white and yellow, daisy-like inflorescences.

== Description ==
Shawia viscosa is a bushy shrub that typically grows to a height of up to about 3 m (9.8 ft) and has more or less glabrous, sticky branchlets. The leaves are arranged in opposite pairs, lance-shaped to narrowly egg-shaped or elliptic, 40–110 mm (1.6–4.3 in) long and 10–40 mm (0.39–1.57 in) wide on a short petiole. The upper surface is sticky or covered with resin glands, the lower surface whitish or yellowish and densely hairy. The heads or daisy-like "flowers" are arranged in moderately dense groups on the ends of branches, each head 8–15 mm (0.31–0.59 in) in diameter with a narrowly conical involucre 3.5–5 mm (0.14–0.20 in) long at the base. Each head has one or two white ray florets, the ligule 3–7 mm (0.12–0.28 in) long, surrounding 3 to 5 yellow disc florets. Flowering occurs in November and December and the fruit is a ribbed, cylindrical achene 3–4 mm (0.12–0.16 in) long, the pappus 5–8 mm (0.20–0.31 in) long.

== Taxonomy ==
This daisy was first formally described in 1806 by Jacques Labillardière who gave it the name Aster viscosus in his book Novae Hollandiae Plantarum Specimen. The specific epithet (viscosa) means "abounding in bird lime", that is "sticky" or "viscid". In 1867, George Bentham changed the name to Olearia viscosa in Flora Australiensis. After the genus Olearia was found to be polyphyletic, the genus Shawia was reinstated, and the name Shawia viscosa, first proposed by Carl Heinrich "Bipontinus" Schultz in 1861, became the accepted species name.

== Distribution and habitat ==
Shawia viscosa grows in forest, mainly in Tasmania where it is widespread and reasonably common, especially in the south of the state, but also in Victoria where it is confined to coastal scrub and the edges of rainforest near Lakes Entrance.
