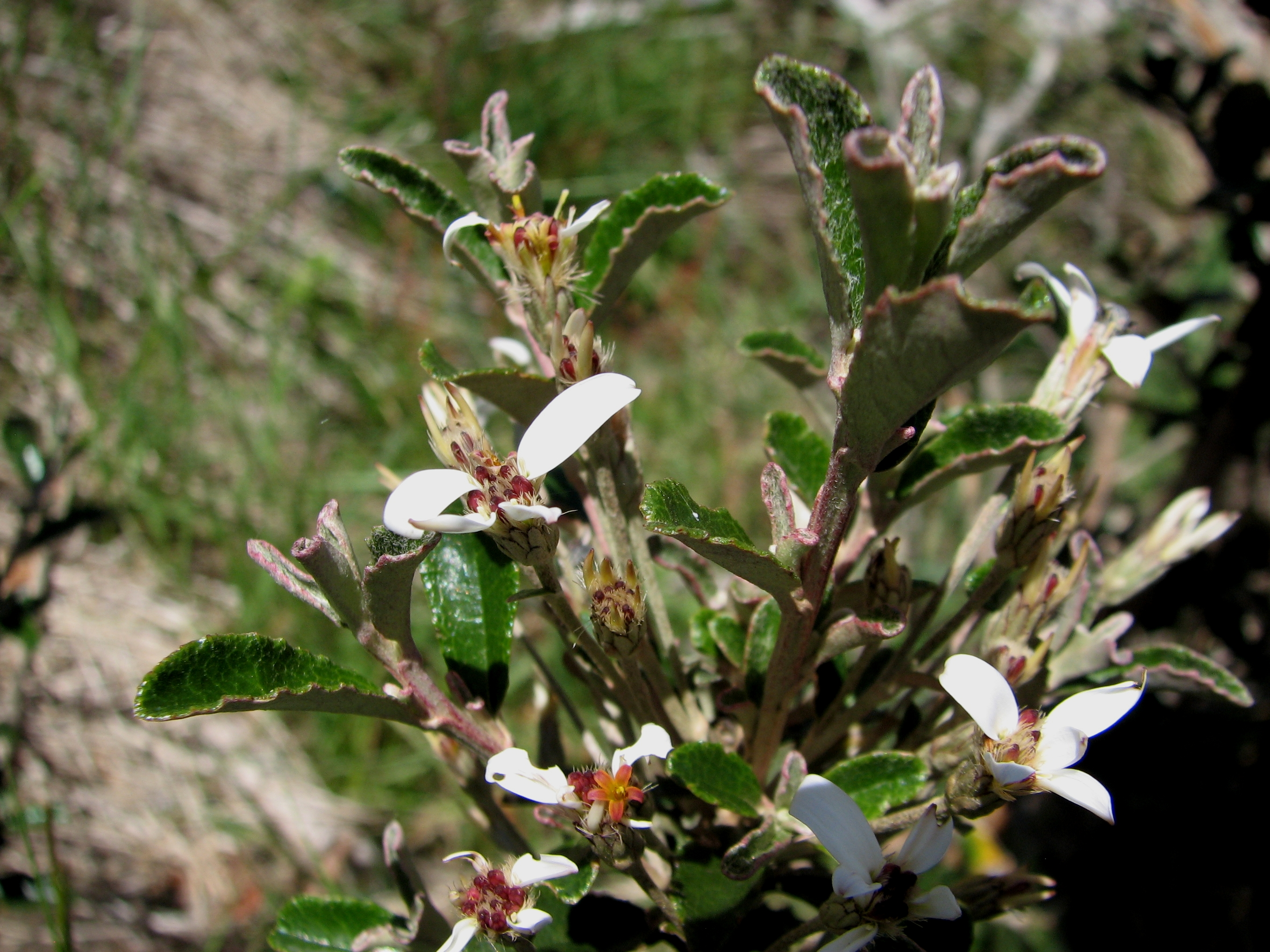
- In the Alpine National Park

Scientific classification
- Kingdom: Plantae
- Clade: Tracheophytes
- Clade: Angiosperms
- Clade: Eudicots
- Clade: Asterids
- Order: Asterales
- Family: Asteraceae
- Genus: Shawia
- Species: S. myrsinoides

Binomial name
- Shawia myrsinoides (Labill.) Sch.Bip.

Synonyms
- Aster berberifolius A.Cunn. ex DC.; Aster ilicifolius A.Cunn. ex DC.; Aster myrsinoides Labill. (1806) (basionym); Eurybia erubescens var. ilicifolia DC.; Eurybia ilicifolia (A.Cunn. ex DC.) Jacob-Makoy ex Bosse; Eurybia lamprophylla F.Muell. ex Sond.; Eurybia myrsinoides (Labill.) Nees; Eurybia myrsinoides var. serrata DC.; Olearia myrsinoides (Labill.) F.Muell. ex Benth.; Olearia myrsinoides var. serrata (DC.) Ewart; Shawia erubescens var. ilicifolia (DC.) Sch.Bip.

= Shawia myrsinoides =

Species of shrub

Shawia myrsinoides, commonly known as silky daisy-bush or blush daisy bush, is a species of flowering plant in the family Asteraceae and is endemic to south-eastern Australia. It is a spreading shrub with hairy branchlets, egg-shaped to elliptic leaves with toothed edges, and white and yellow or mauve, daisy-like inflorescences.

== Description ==
Shawia myrsinoides is a spreading shrub that typically grows to a height of 0.8–1.5 m (2 ft 7 in – 4 ft 11 in), its branchlets covered with whitish hairs. The leaves are arranged alternately, egg-shaped with the narrower end towards the base, to elliptic, 4–30 mm (0.16–1.18 in) long and 3–22 mm (0.12–0.87 in) wide with toothed edges. The upper surface of the leaves is dark green and glabrous, the lower side covered with whitish hairs. The heads or daisy-like "flowers" are arranged in leafy panicles in leaf axils and on the ends of branches on a peduncle up to 32 mm (1.3 in) long. The heads are 13–21 mm (0.51–0.83 in) wide with a conical involucre 4–6 mm (0.16–0.24 in) long. Each head has two to four white ray florets, the ligule 6–8 mm (0.24–0.31 in) long, surrounding three or four yellow or mauve disc florets. Flowering occurs from March to November and the fruit is a glabrous achene, the pappus 5–8 mm (0.20–0.31 in) long.

== Taxonomy ==
Silky daisy-bush was first formally described in 1806 by Jacques Labillardière, who gave it the name Aster myrsinoides in his Novae Hollandiae Plantarum Specimen. In 1867, George Bentham changed the name to Olearia myrsinoides in Flora Australiensis. After the genus Olearia was found to be polyphyletic, the genus Shawia was reinstated, and the name Shawia myrsinoides, first proposed by Carl Heinrich "Bipontinus" Schultz in 1861, became the accepted species name.

== Distribution and habitat ==
Shawia myrsinoides grows in forest, woodland, grassland, and swampy areas in eastern New South Wales, southern Victoria and Tasmania.
