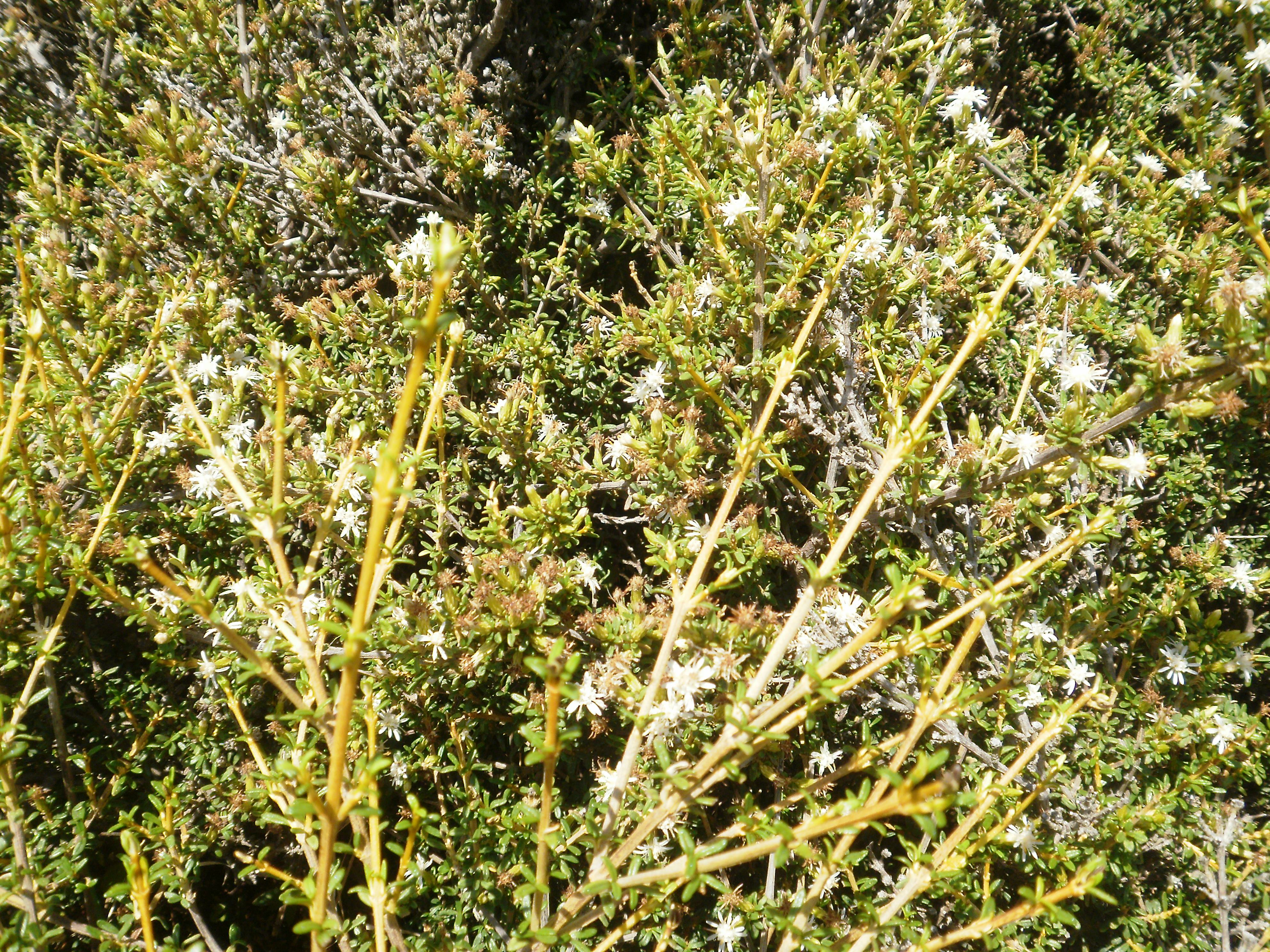

Scientific classification
- Kingdom: Plantae
- Clade: Tracheophytes
- Clade: Angiosperms
- Clade: Eudicots
- Clade: Asterids
- Order: Asterales
- Family: Asteraceae
- Genus: Shawia
- Species: S. solandri

Binomial name
- Shawia solandri (Hook.f.) Sch.Bip.

Synonyms
- Aster solandri (Hook.f.) F.Muell.; Eurybia solandri Hook.f.; Olearia consimilis Colenso; Olearia fasciculifolia Colenso; Olearia solandri (Hook.f.) Hook.f.

= Shawia solandri =

Species of tree

Shawia solandri, commonly known as coastal daisy-bush or coastal tree daisy, is a coastal shrub of New Zealand in the Asteraceae family.

The plant has an upright, bushy stature, with leaves 5–8 mm long. S. solandri can grow into a small tree about four metres high.

== Taxonomy ==
The species was one of the first 350~ specimens collected by Joseph Banks and Daniel Solander during the First voyage of James Cook. It was first formally described as Eurybia solandri by Joseph Dalton Hooker in 1852. The species was named after Daniel Solander. In 1864 Hooker placed the species in genus Olearia as O. solandri. After the genus Olearia was found to be polyphyletic, the genus Shawia was reinstated, and the name Shawia erubescens, first proposed by Carl Heinrich "Bipontinus" Schultz in 1861, became the accepted species name.

== Distribution ==
The species is native to the North Island and the northern parts of the South Island of New Zealand.
