= Shawia chrysophylla =

Scientific classification
- Kingdom: Plantae
- Clade: Tracheophytes
- Clade: Angiosperms
- Clade: Eudicots
- Clade: Asterids
- Order: Asterales
- Family: Asteraceae
- Genus: Shawia
- Species: S. chrysophylla

Binomial name
- Shawia chrysophylla (DC.) Sch.Bip.

Synonyms
- Aster chrysophyllus A.Cunn. ex DC.; Eurybia chrysophylla DC.; Shawia chrysophylla (DC.) Benth.

Species of shrub

Shawia chrysophylla is a species of flowering plant in the family Asteraceae and is endemic to eastern Australia. It is a shrub with scattered elliptic leaves, and white and yellow, daisy-like inflorescences.

== Description ==
Shawia chrysophylla is a shrub that typically grows to a height of up to 3 m (9.8 ft). It has scattered elliptic leaves arranged in opposite pairs, 15–115 mm (0.59–4.53 in) long and 4–38 mm (0.16–1.50 in) wide on a petiole up to 12 mm (0.47 in) long, the edges of the leaves sometimes with indistinct teeth. The upper surface of the leaves is glabrous but the lower surface is covered with felt-like, pale brown hairs. The heads or daisy-like "flowers" are arranged on the ends of branchlets and are 22–28 mm (0.87–1.10 in) in diameter on a peduncle up to 53 mm (2.1 in) long. Each head has four to seven white ray florets surrounding twelve to fourteen yellow disc florets. Flowering occurs from November to January and the fruit is a glabrous achene, the pappus with 73 to 85 bristles in two rows.

== Taxonomy ==
This daisy bush was first formally described in 1836 by Augustin Pyramus de Candolle who gave it the name Eurybia chrysophylla in his Prodromus Systematis Naturalis Regni Vegetabilis. The specific epithet (chrysophylla) means "golden-leaved". In 1867 George Bentham changed that name to Olearia chrysophylla in Flora Australiensis. After the genus Olearia was found to be polyphyletic, the genus Shawia was reinstated, and the name Shawia chrysophylla, first proposed by Carl Heinrich "Bipontinus" Schultz in 1861, became the accepted species name.

== Distribution and habitat ==
Shawia chrysophylla grows in forest, usually at higher elevations, from south-east Queensland to the New England National Park in New South Wales, sometimes as far inland as Jenolan Caves and Bathurst.
