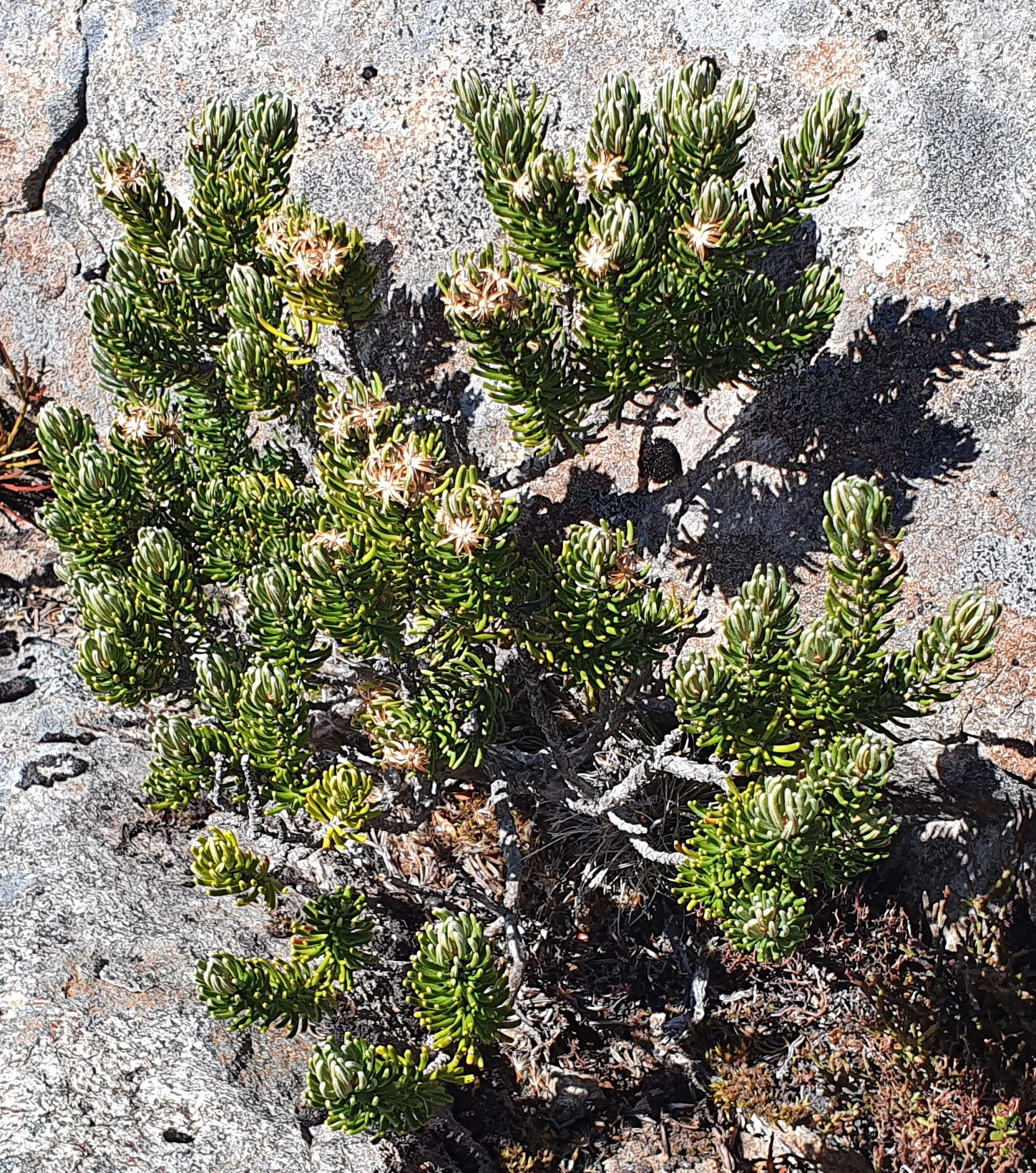
- In Mount Field National Park

Scientific classification
- Kingdom: Plantae
- Clade: Tracheophytes
- Clade: Angiosperms
- Clade: Eudicots
- Clade: Asterids
- Order: Asterales
- Family: Asteraceae
- Genus: Shawia
- Species: S. ledifolia

Binomial name
- Shawia ledifolia (DC.) Sch.Bip.
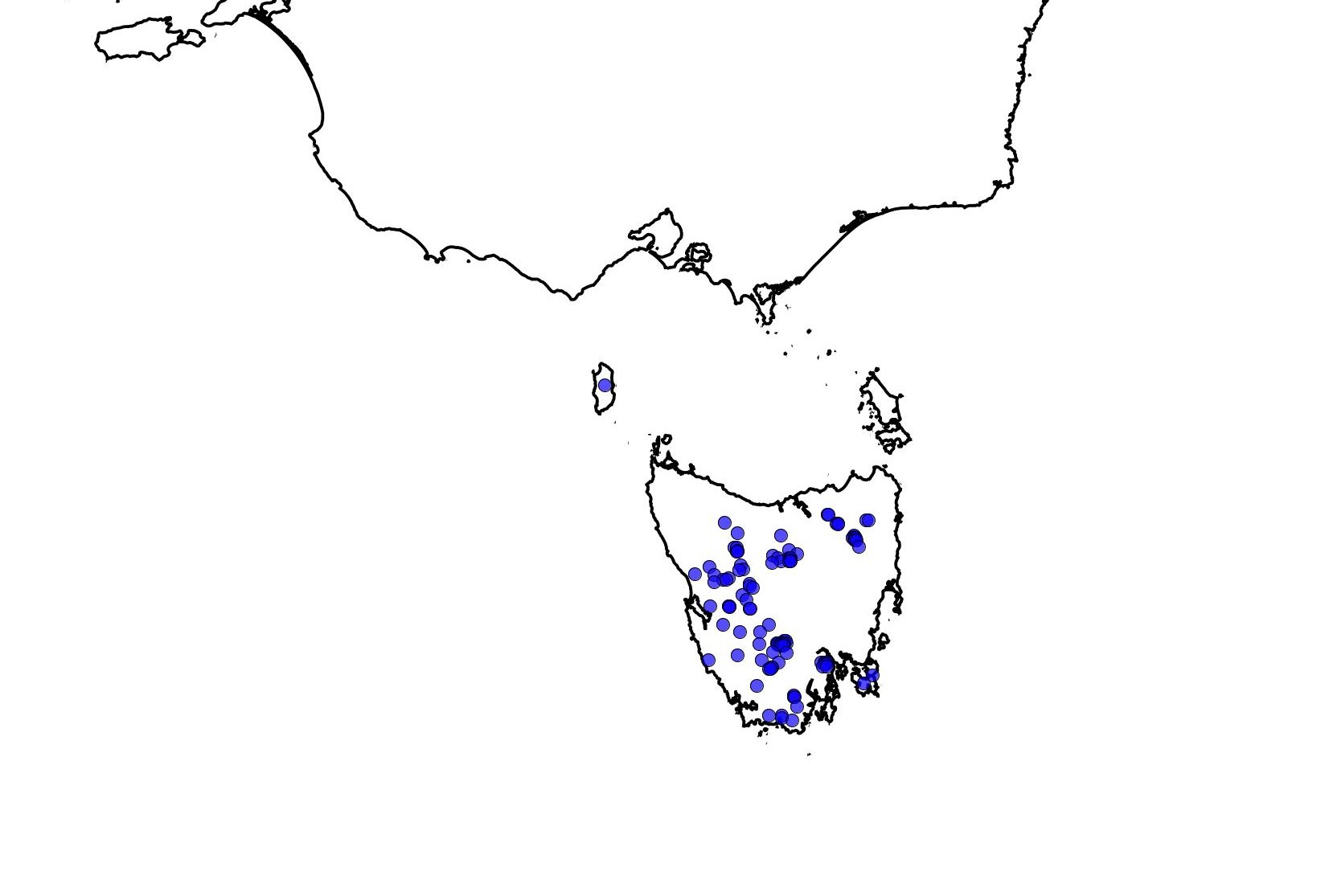
- Occurrence data from AVH

Synonyms
- Aster ledifolius A.Cunn. ex DC. nom. inval., pro syn.; Eurybia ledifolia DC.; Olearia ledifolia (DC.) Benth.

= Shawia ledifolia =

Species of shrub

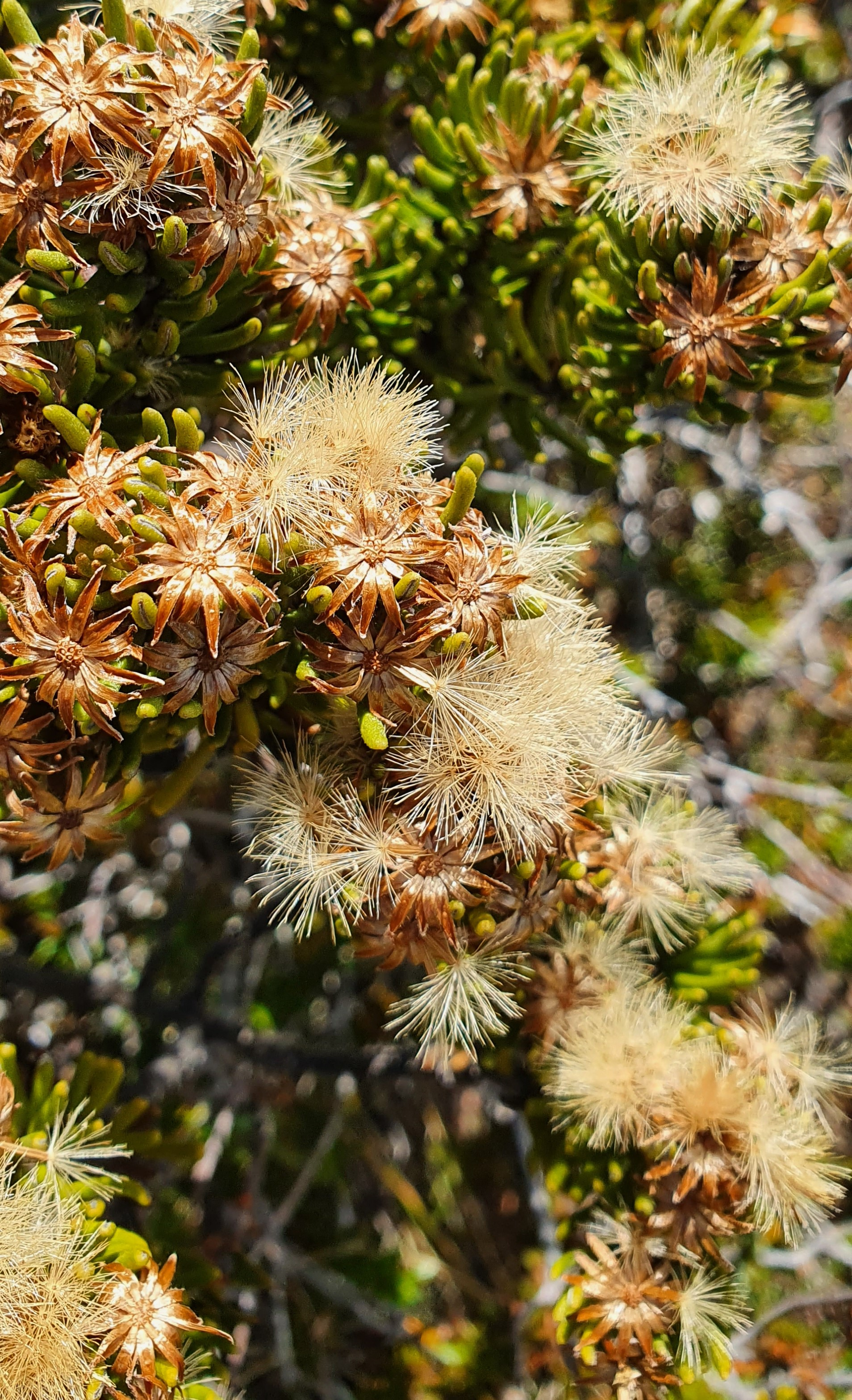
Shawia ledifolia dry inflorescence and pappus

Shawia ledifolia, commonly known as rock daisy bush, is a species of flowering plant of the family Asteraceae. It is endemic to Tasmania and found at higher elevations where it grows as a low, compact bush with tough, leathery leaves and small white and yellow daisy-like "flowers" in summer.

== Description ==
Shawia ledifolia typically forms a compact, low lying and rigid shrub about 0.5 m (1 ft 8 in) tall. The branches are numerous and densely packed with young growth covered in fine rust-coloured hairs. The lower sections of the branches may have raised scars from leaves that fall off after one or two years. The dark green leaves are tough and leathery, oblong, approximately 12–14 mm (0.47–0.55 in) long and arranged alternately along the stems. The upper surface of the leaf is usually glabrous, with the margins of the leaf rolled down and inwards. The lower leaf surface is covered in fine hairs that may appear rusty brown to silver.

The heads or daisy-like "flowers" contain numerous florets, with involucral bracts at the base. The heads are daisy-like in appearance with 10 – 12 white ray florets, the ligule approximately 10 mm (0.39 in) long, surrounding deep yellow disc florets. The heads are borne singly on short peduncles in the leaf axils near the tips of branches. The fruit is a shiny, glabrous achene with seed dispersal being assisted by dry, wind borne pappus. Flowering occurs in the southern hemisphere summer months of January and February.

== Taxonomy ==
This species was first formally described in 1836 by Augustin Pyramus de Candolle who gave it the name Eurybia ledifolia in his Prodromus Systematis Naturalis Regni Vegetabilis from specimens collected in rocky places on Mount Wellington by Allan Cunningham. The specific epithet (ledifolia) is derived from the Greek 'ledos' (woollen cloth) and the Latin 'folium' (leaf), referring to the hairy under surface of the leaves. In 1867, George Bentham changed the name to Olearia ledifolia in Flora Australiensis. After the genus Olearia was found to be polyphyletic, the genus Shawia was reinstated, and the name Shawia ledifolia, first proposed by Carl Heinrich "Bipontinus" Schultz in 1861, became the accepted species name.

== Distribution and habitat ==
Shawia ledifolia is endemic to the island state of Tasmania and has been recorded on King Island. It is a common species in alpine heath, bolster heath, deciduous heath, fjaeldmark, alpine sedgeland and coniferous heath at elevations above 1000m. Its common name, the rock daisy bush, refers to its preference for sheltered rocky slopes and scree fields amongst mountain plateaus.

== Ecology ==
Shawia ledifolia may become a co-dominant species at higher elevations where the growth of trees is limited by climatic factors. These environments are subject to snow and ice, low temperatures, strong winds and high UV levels. The primary threat to the plant communities where S. ledifolia grows is fire, with frequent burning greatly decreasing the likelihood of recovery and leading to species impoverishment. However, it is unclear what the response of S. ledifolia is to fire at the species level. Other threats include trampling, grazing pressures from livestock and climate change.

Strongly revolute leaf margins are a frequently recorded xeromorphic adaptions for plants that are subject to water stress, especially when coupled with growths of hair like trichomes. The morphology of the leaf serves to increase the boundary layer between the stomata positioned on the underside of the leaf and the external desiccating environment, thus preventing water loss during gas exchange. The classically thin skeletal soils of alpine Tasmania where S. ledifolia occurs have limited water holding capacity and are often subject to summer drought conditions.

== Similar species ==
Due to its growth habit and the leaf morphology, Shawia ledifolia bears strong superficial resemblance to Orites revoluta (a member of the Proteaceae family) when not bearing reproductive structures. Compounding possible misidentification, these species are regularly found growing in close association with each other. The two species can be separated by the lack of hairy leaves, proteaceous flowers and splitting follicles of O. revoluta.

== Cultivation ==
Shawia ledifolia is rarely cultivated because of its restrictive habitat requirements. However, surface sowing of freshly collected seed that has been allowed to dry has yielded some success, with germination occurring in 2 – 5 weeks. It prefers well-drained, moist, acidic soil in full sun and is frost and wind tolerant. It has proven resistant to the soil-borne disease Phytophthora cinnamomi, but it is intolerant to phosphorus.
