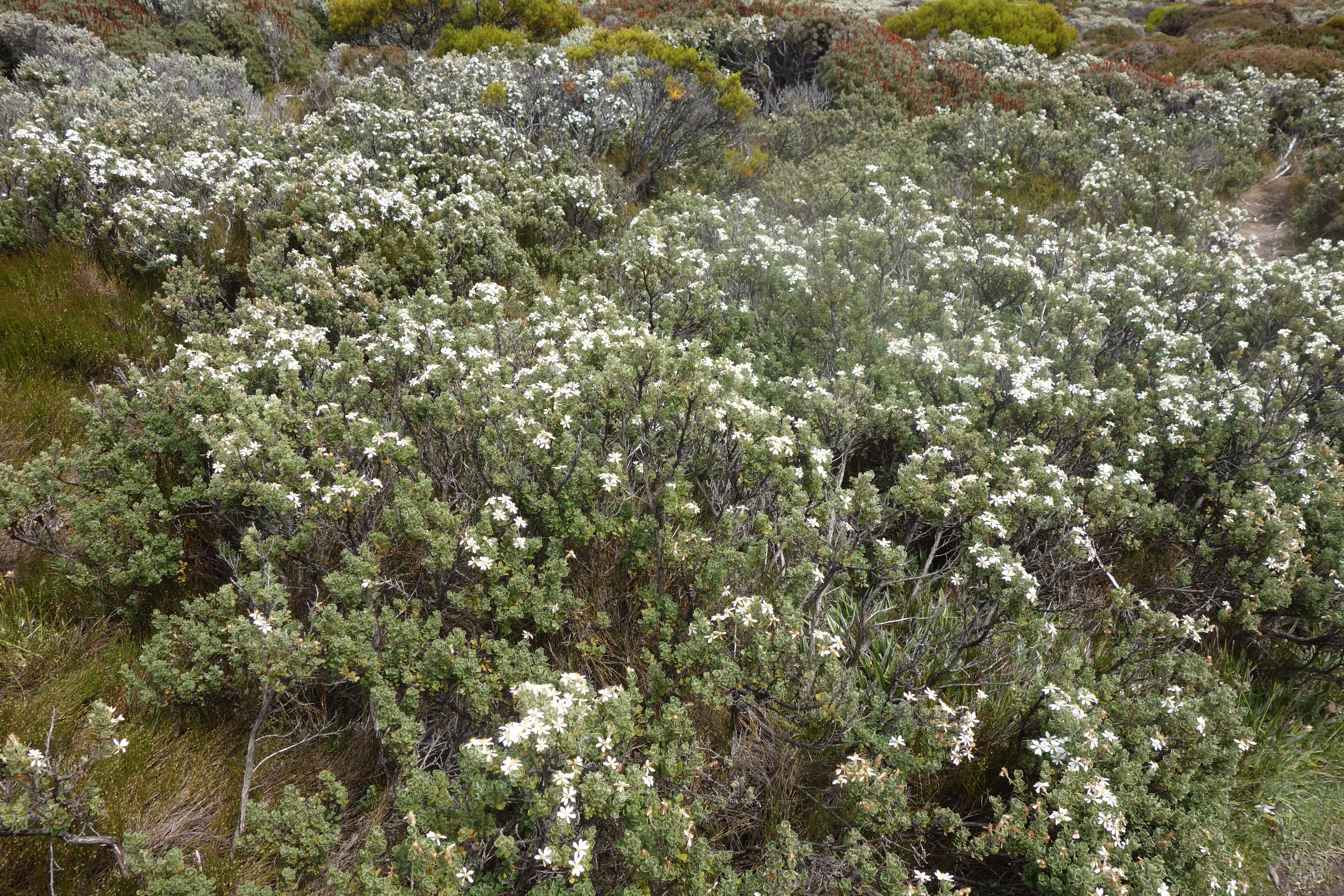
- On Ben Lomond

Scientific classification
- Kingdom: Plantae
- Clade: Tracheophytes
- Clade: Angiosperms
- Clade: Eudicots
- Clade: Asterids
- Order: Asterales
- Family: Asteraceae
- Genus: Shawia
- Species: S. obcordata

Binomial name
- Shawia obcordata (Hook.f.) Sch.Bip.

Synonyms
- Aster obcordatus (Hook.f.) F.Muell.; Eurybia obcordata Hook.f.; Olearia obcordata (Hook.f.) Benth.

= Shawia obcordata =

Species of flowering plant

Shawia obcordata is a species of flowering plant in the family Asteraceae and is endemic to Tasmania. It is a shrub that typically grows to a height of less than 3 ft (0.91 m). It usually has wedge-shaped leaves arranged alternately along the branchlets, the narrower end towards the base, with three or five teeth on the ends. The flowers are arranged singly in leaf axils and are few in number with up to six ray florets.

The species was first formally described in 1847 by Joseph Dalton Hooker who gave it the name Eurybia obcordata in the London Journal of Botany from specimens collected by Ronald Campbell Gunn. The specific epithet (obcordata) means "inverted heart-shaped". In 1867, George Bentham changed the name to Olearia obcordata in Flora Australiensis. After the genus Olearia was found to be polyphyletic, the genus Shawia was reinstated, and the name Shawia obcordata, first proposed by Carl Heinrich "Bipontinus" Schultz in 1861, became the accepted species name.

Shawia obcordata grows in drier mountain areas of Tasmania.
