= Chrysophtalmum =

Scientific classification
- Kingdom: Plantae
- Clade: Tracheophytes
- Clade: Angiosperms
- Clade: Eudicots
- Clade: Asterids
- Order: Asterales
- Family: Asteraceae
- Genus: Chrysophtalmum; Sch.Bip. ex Walp.

Genus of flowering plants

Chrysophtalmum is a genus of flowering plants belonging to the family Asteraceae.

Its native range is Turkey to Northern Iraq.

Species:

- Chrysophtalmum dichotomum Boiss. & Heldr.
- Chrysophtalmum gueneri Aytaç & Anderb.
- Chrysophtalmum montanum (Aucher ex DC.) Boiss.
