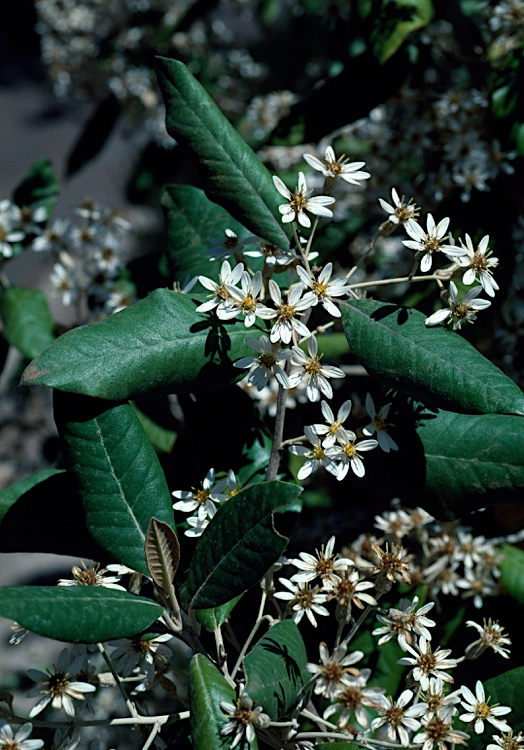

Scientific classification
- Kingdom: Plantae
- Clade: Tracheophytes
- Clade: Angiosperms
- Clade: Eudicots
- Clade: Asterids
- Order: Asterales
- Family: Asteraceae
- Genus: Shawia
- Species: S. cydoniifolia

Binomial name
- Shawia cydoniifolia (DC.) Sch.Bip.

Synonyms
- Aster beckleri (F.Muell.) F.Muell.; Aster cydoniifolius A.Cunn. ex DC. not validly publ.; Eurybia beckleri F.Muell.; Eurybia cydoniifolia DC.; Olearia cydoniifolia (DC.) Benth.

= Shawia cydoniifolia =

Species of shrub

Shawia cydoniifolia is a species of flowering plant in the family Asteraceae and is endemic to eastern Australia. It is a shrub with scattered elliptic leaves, and white and yellow, daisy-like inflorescences.

== Description ==
Shawia cydoniifolia is a shrub that typically grows to a height of up to 4 m (13 ft). It has scattered elliptic leaves arranged alternately along the branchlets, 20–114 mm (0.79–4.49 in) long and 9–53 mm (0.35–2.09 in) wide on a petiole up to 17 mm (0.67 in) long. The upper surface of the leaves is glabrous but the lower surface is covered with felt-like, silvery hairs. The heads or daisy-like "flowers" are in corymbs near the ends of branchlets and are 15–21 mm (0.59–0.83 in) in diameter on a peduncle up to 15 mm (0.59 in) long. Each head has six to ten white ray florets surrounding thirteen to seventeen yellow disc florets. Flowering occurs in October and November and the fruit is a silky-hairy achene, the pappus with 40 to 44 bristles in two rows.

== Taxonomy ==
This daisy bush was first formally described in 1836 by Augustin Pyramus de Candolle who gave it the name Eurybia cydoniifolia in his Prodromus Systematis Naturalis Regni Vegetabilis. In 1867 George Bentham changed that name to Olearia cydoniifolia in Flora Australiensis. After the genus Olearia was found to be polyphyletic, the genus Shawia was reinstated, and the name Shawia chrysophylla, first proposed by Carl Heinrich "Bipontinus" Schultz in 1861, became the accepted species name.

== Distribution and habitat ==
Shawia cydoniifolia grows in forest and on the edges of dry rainforest mainly on the east of the Great Dividing Range between the Apsley River and Guyra in north-eastern New South Wales and in south-eastern Queensland.
