= Carl Heinrich "Schultzenstein" Schultz =

German physician and botanist

Carl (or Karl) Heinrich Schultz (8 July 1798 in Altruppin – 22 March 1871), known as Carl Heinrich "Schultzenstein" Schultz, was a German medical doctor and botanist. The appellation "Schultzenstein" is a reference to his birthplace; this was necessary to distinguish him from his contemporary Carl Heinrich "Bipontinus" Schultz, also a German botanist.

From 1817 he studied medicine at Friedrich Wilhelms-Institut in Berlin, having designs on a career as a military physician. In 1825 he became an associate professor of medicine. He later traveled to Paris, where he advanced his theories involving the circulation of sap in plants. In 1833 he obtained the title of full professor.

He was a proponent of Goethe's mystical "nature-philosophy" view of the natural world. In his investigations of the vascular system in plants, he promoted ideas on its function being analogous to the circulatory system of animals.

== Written works ==
- Ueber den Kreislauf des Saftes im Schöllkraut, etc. 1822 (doctoral dissertation) - On the circulation of sap in the celandine.
- Cyklose des Lebenssafts, 1841 - Cyclosis of vital sap in plants.
- Anaphytose od. Verjüngung der Pflanzen - Anaphytosis or the rejuvenation of the plant.
- Neuestes System der Morphologie der Pflanzen, 1847 - Latest system on the morphology of plants.
- Über die Verjüngung des menschlichen Lebens, (second edition 1850) - The rejuvenation of human life.
- Die Verjüngung im Thierreich, 1854 - Rejuvenation in the animal kingdom.
- Allgemeine Krankheitslehre, (two volumes 1844–45) - General pathology.
- Die Heilwirkungen der Arzneien, Berlin 1846 - Therapeutic effects of drugs.
