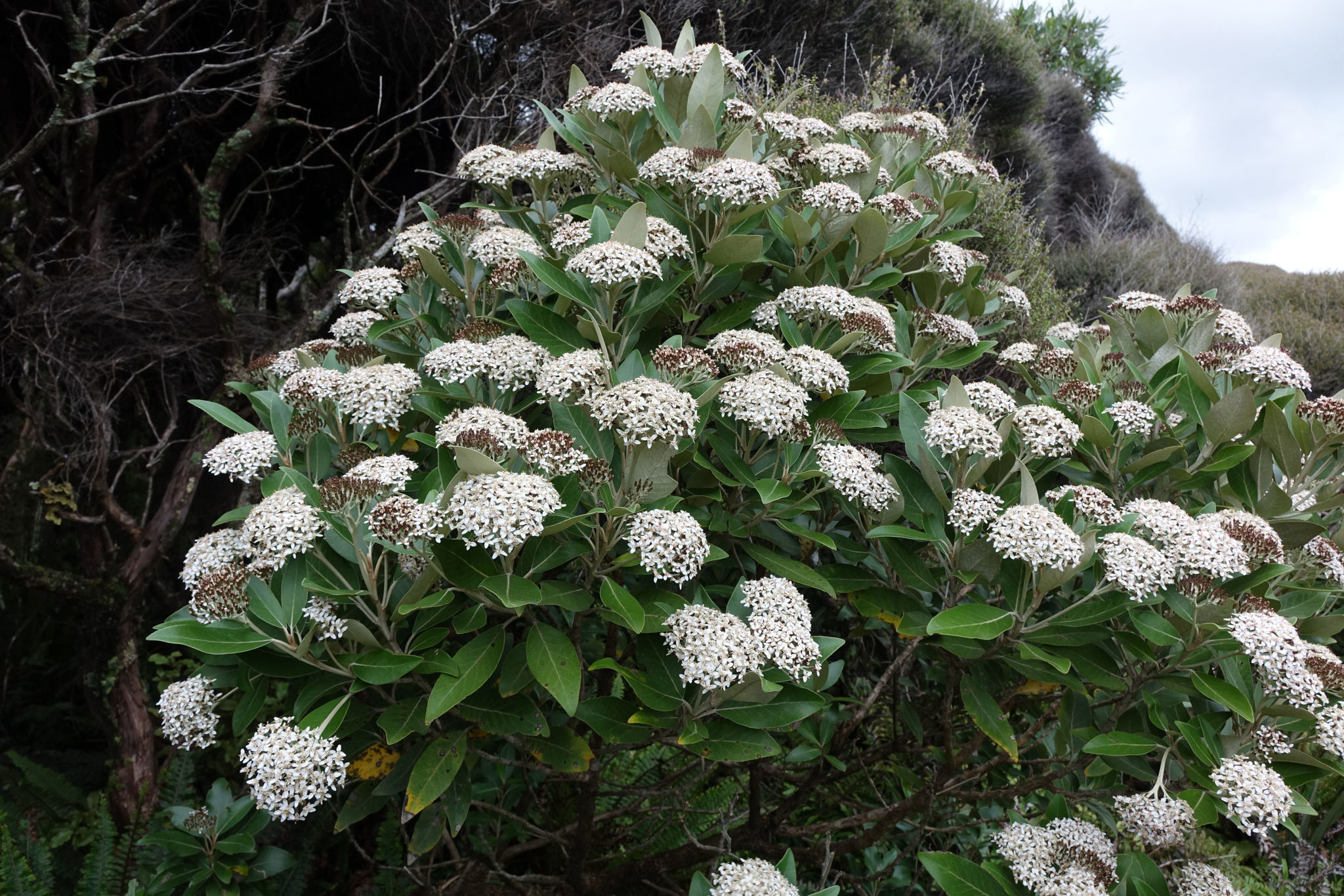
- On Stewart Island

Scientific classification
- Kingdom: Plantae
- Clade: Tracheophytes
- Clade: Angiosperms
- Clade: Eudicots
- Clade: Asterids
- Order: Asterales
- Family: Asteraceae
- Genus: Shawia
- Species: S. avicenniifolia

Binomial name
- Shawia avicenniifolia Raoul

Synonyms
- Aster avicenniifolius (Raoul) F.Muell.; Eurybia avicenniifolia (Raoul) Hook.f.; Olearia avicenniifolia (Raoul) Hook.f.

= Shawia avicenniifolia =

Species of flowering plant

Shawia avicenniifolia, commonly known as mountain akeake, is a flowering plant in the family Asteraceae. It is endemic to New Zealand where it is found on the southern coastlines of the South Island and on Stewart Island. It is classified as Not Threatened.

== Description ==
Mountain akeake is a small, bushy shrub or tree that grows up to 6 metres tall and 3 metres wide. It has thin, papery bark and angular branchlets covered in white tomentum. Leaves are oblong-lanceolate in shape. They are dark green in colour with a downy, white underside. Leaf length varies between 5–10 cm long and 3–5 cm wide.

Flowers are clustered and daisy-like with white rays and purple central disks. They emerge between November and February and have a sweet scent. Flowers are about 5 centimetres wide and carried in clusters of three to ten. The flowers develop into fluffy seeds.

== Taxonomy ==
The species was first described in 1846 by Étienne Raoul as Shawia avicenniifolia and transferred to the Olearia genus by Joseph Dalton Hooker in 1864. Recent phylogenetic and morphological data has led to the reinstatement of the genus Shawia, including S. avicenniifolia.
