= Erlangea alternifolia =

Scientific classification
- Kingdom: Plantae
- Clade: Tracheophytes
- Clade: Angiosperms
- Clade: Eudicots
- Clade: Asterids
- Order: Asterales
- Family: Asteraceae
- Genus: Erlangea
- Species: E. alternifolia

Binomial name
- Erlangea alternifolia (O.Hoffm.) S.Moore

Synonyms
- Bothriocline alternifolia O.Hoffm.

Species of plant

Erlangea alternifolia is an annual herb within the family Asteraceae. It occurs in Tanzania and Kenya.

== Description ==
An annual herb, it grows up to 180 cm, with a variability between 23-180 cm in height. Leaves are elliptic to obovate in outline and the apex is obtuse to rounded, base is cuneate or attenuate. Inflorescence is capitulum with a cyme that is terminal and corymbiform like, a receptacle that is concave in outline, and phyllaries that are narrowly ovate, up to 8 mm long. Flowers: corolla is purple colored, lobes range is between 2.3-2.5 mm long, the corolla has multicellular purple like hairs at the apex.
