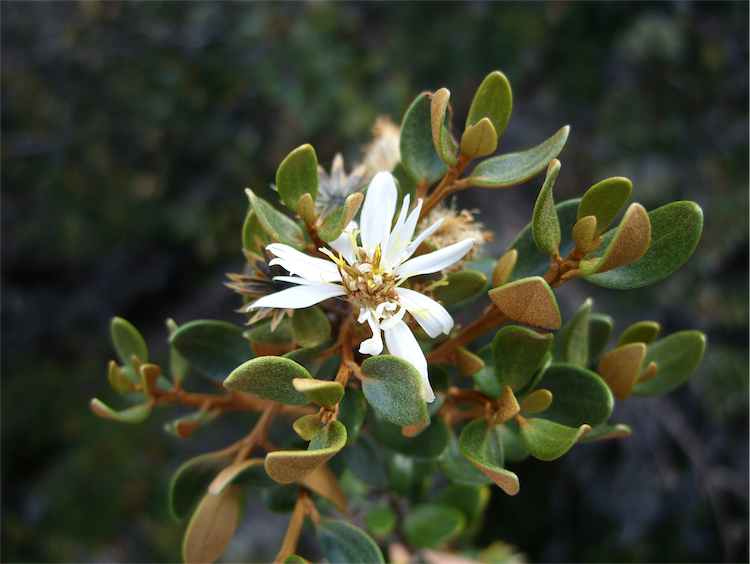
- On a Tasmanian Land Conservancy property

Scientific classification
- Kingdom: Plantae
- Clade: Tracheophytes
- Clade: Angiosperms
- Clade: Eudicots
- Clade: Asterids
- Order: Asterales
- Family: Asteraceae
- Genus: Olearia
- Species: O. tasmanica

Binomial name
- Olearia tasmanica W.M.Curtis

Synonyms
- Eurybia alpina Hook.f.; Olearia alpina (Hook.f.) W.M.Curtis nom. illeg.; Olearia persoonioides var. alpina (Hook.f.) Benth.; Shawia alpina (Hook.f.) Sch.Bip.

= Olearia tasmanica =

Species of flowering plant

Olearia tasmanica is a species of flowering plant in the family Asteraceae and is endemic to Tasmania. It is a shrub that typically grows to a height of 1.0–1.5 m (3 ft 3 in – 4 ft 11 in) and has oblong to egg-shaped leaves with the narrower end towards the base, 19–40 mm (0.75–1.57 in) long and with a blunt tip. The heads or daisy-like "flowers" have up to 8 ray florets. Flowering mainly occurs in January and the fruit is a smooth achene.

This daisy was first formally described in 1847 by Joseph Dalton Hooker who gave it the name Eurybia alpina in the London Journal of Botany from specimens collected on Mount Wellington. In 1963, Winifred Curtis changed the name to Olearia alpina in The Student's Flora of Tasmania, but that name is illegitimate because it had already been used by Buchanan for a New Zealand species now known as Olearia lacunosa. In 1970, Curtis changed the name to Olearia tasmanica in The Victorian Naturalist.
