= Erlangea calycina =

Scientific classification
- Kingdom: Plantae
- Clade: Tracheophytes
- Clade: Angiosperms
- Clade: Eudicots
- Clade: Asterids
- Order: Asterales
- Family: Asteraceae
- Genus: Erlangea
- Species: E. calycina

Binomial name
- Erlangea calycina S.Moore

Synonyms
- Bothriocline calycina (S.Moore) M.G.Gilbert

Species of plant

Erlangea calycina is a perennial herb within the family Asteraceae. Its occurs in Tanzania and Kenya.

== Description ==
The species grows to about 75 cm high, with a height range of between 20 and 75 cm. It has rhizomatous stems covered with silky hairs. Leaves, alternate, are elliptic to obovate in outline, 2.5–12 cm long and 0.5–3 cm wide, pubescent above and beneath, with long white hairs in the case of the latter. Inflorescence is capitulum; the phyllaries' outer surface is foliaceous and it is broadly lanceolate to ovate in outline, the longest is about 14 mm. Corolla is purplish or mauve in color, grows up to 14 mm long, lobes are 3.5–5 mm long, usually with stiff flowers at the apex. Achenes are 3 mm long.
