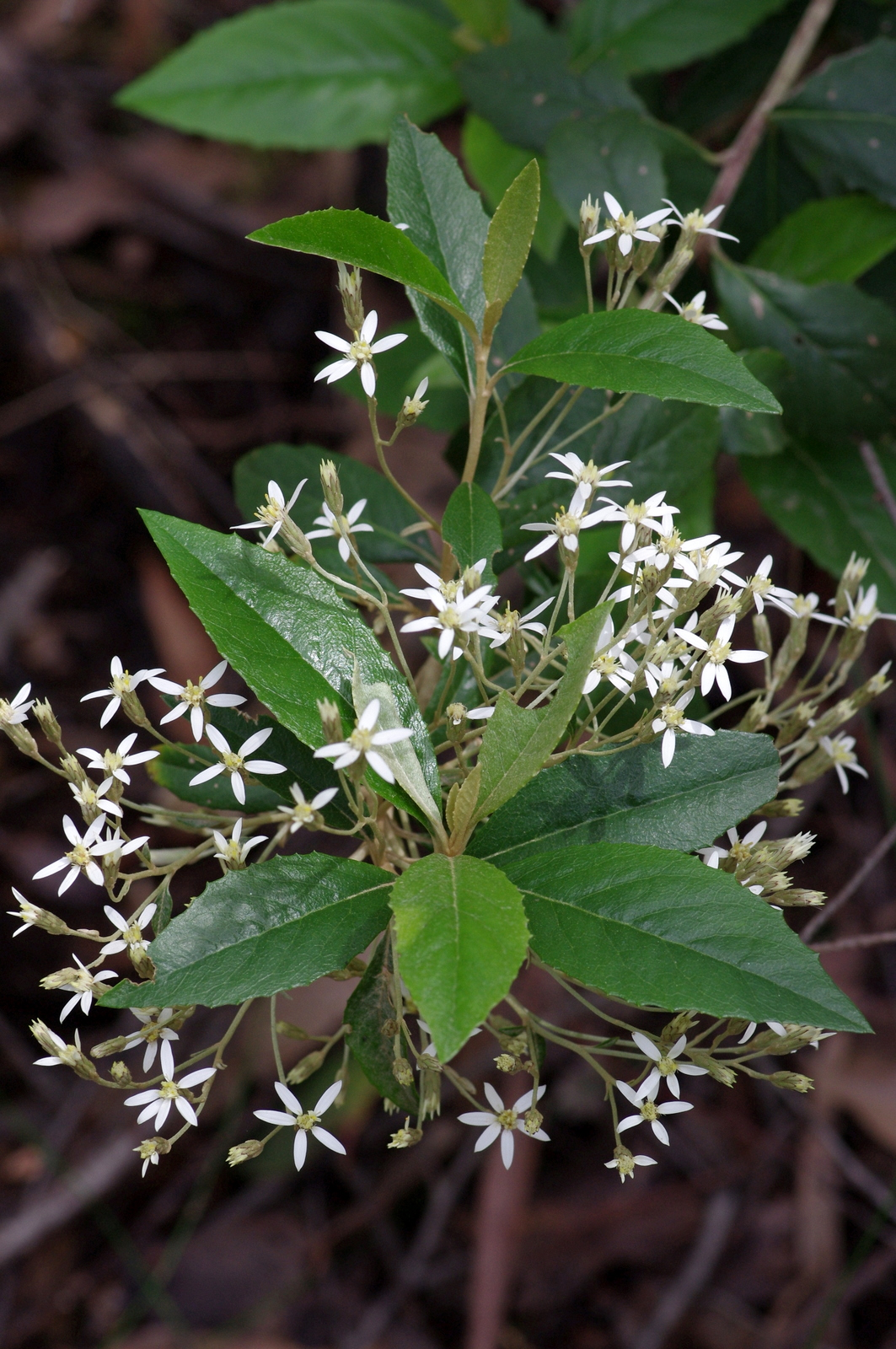
- Shawia argophylla

Scientific classification
- Kingdom: Plantae
- Clade: Tracheophytes
- Clade: Angiosperms
- Clade: Eudicots
- Clade: Asterids
- Order: Asterales
- Family: Asteraceae
- Genus: Shawia
- Species: S. argophylla

Binomial name
- Shawia argophylla (Labill.) Baill.
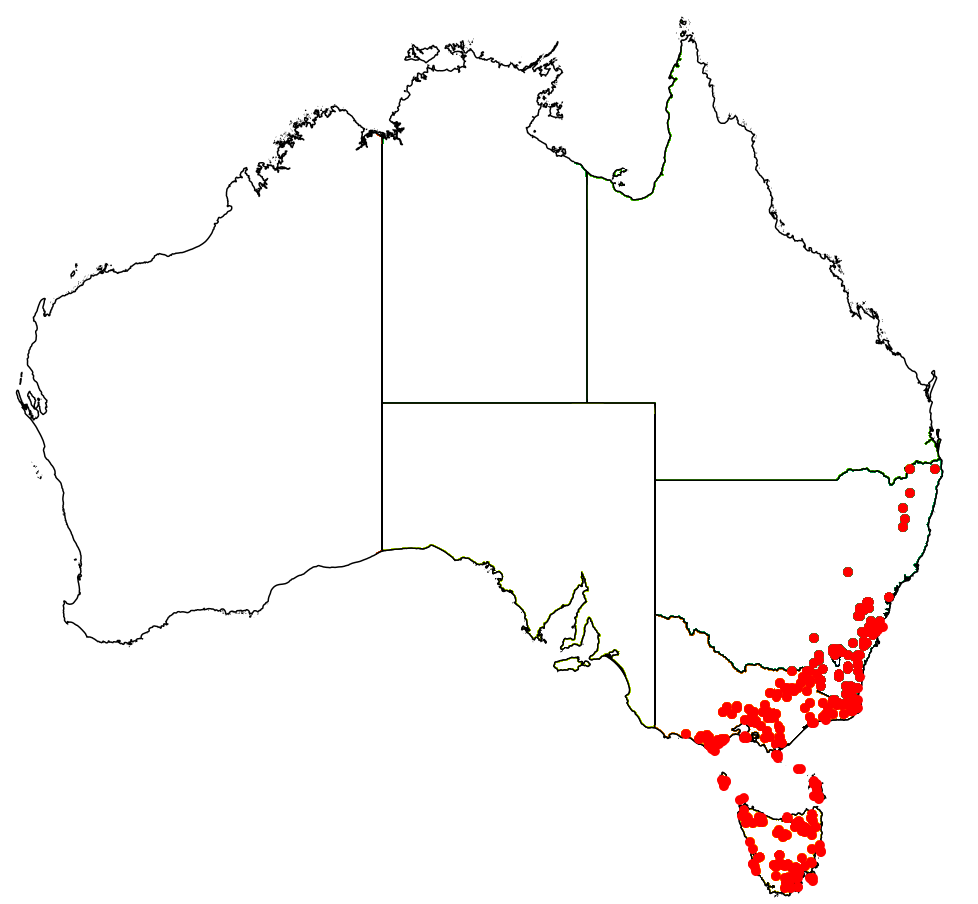

Synonyms
- Aster argophyllus Labill. (1806); Aster caryophyllus Steud.; Aster moschatus Colla; Eurybia argophylla (Labill.) Cass.; Haxtonia argophylla (Labill.) Caley ex D.Don; Olearia argophylla (Labill.) F.Muell. ex Benth.; Olearia argophylla var. grandiflora C.T.White

= Shawia argophylla =

Musk daisy-bush

Species of shrub

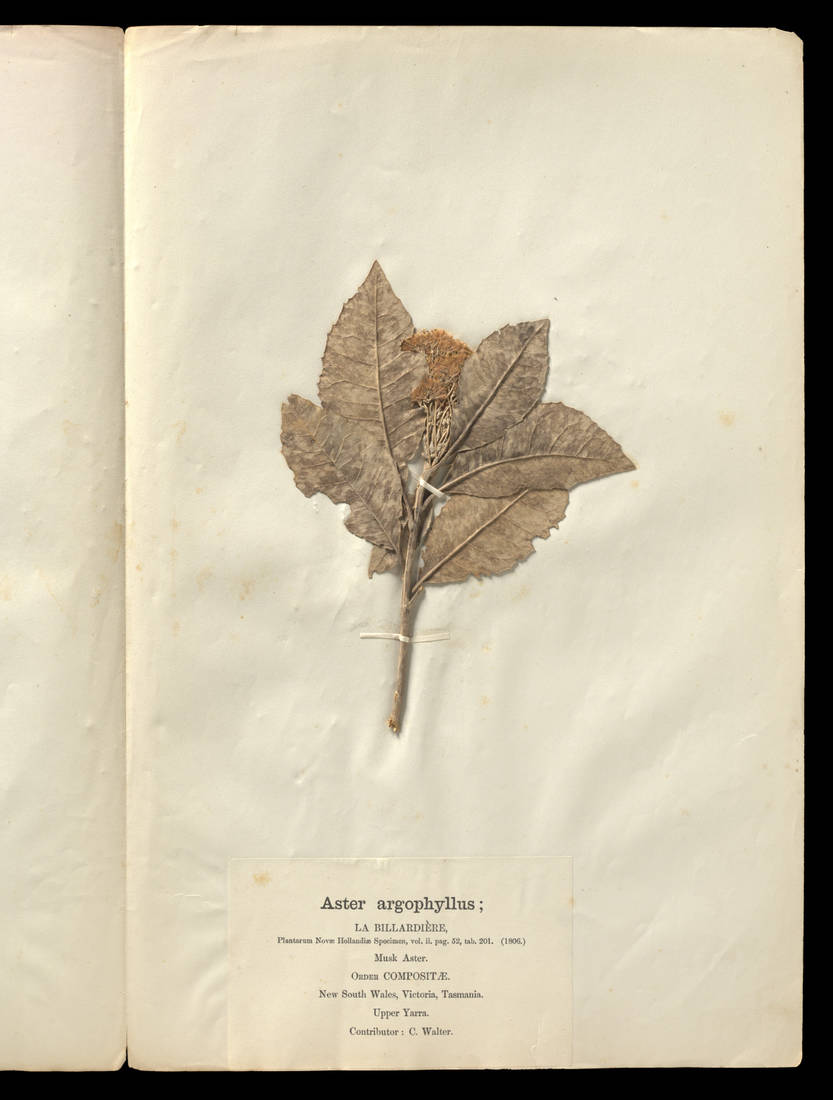
Botanical specimen from 1806

Shawia argophylla, commonly known as musk daisy-bush, native musk or silver shrub, is a species of flowering plant in the family Asteraceae and is endemic to south-eastern Australia. It is a shrub or tree with silvery branchlets, egg-shaped to elliptic leaves, and white and yellow, daisy-like inflorescences.

== Description ==
Shawia argophylla is a shrub or tree that typically grows to a height of up to about 10 m (33 ft), and has fissured to slightly stringy or flaky bark. Its branchlets are densely covered with fine, silvery or pale brown hairs pressed against the surface. The leaves are arranged alternately, egg-shaped to broadly elliptic, mostly 30–120 mm (1.2–4.7 in) long and 20–70 mm (0.79–2.76 in) wide on a petiole up to 25 mm (0.98 in) long, and have toothed edges. The upper surface of the leaves is glabrous and the lower surface covered with minute, woolly, white or silvery hairs.

The heads are 13–27 mm (0.51–1.06 in) wide and arranged in corymbs on the ends of branchlets, each corymb on a peduncle up to 20 mm (0.79 in) long. Each head or daisy-like "flower" has three to eight white ray florets, the petal-like ligule 4–10 mm (0.16–0.39 in) long, surrounding three to eight yellow disc florets. Flowering mainly occurs from September to February and the fruit is a straw-coloured or pinkish achene 2.5–4.0 mm (0.098–0.157 in) long, the pappus with 26–43 bristles about 5 mm (0.20 in) long.

== Taxonomy ==
Musk daisy-bush was first formally described in 1806 by Jacques Labillardière who gave it the name Aster argophyllus in his book Novae Hollandiae Plantarum Specimen. In 1825, Henri Cassini changed Labillardière's name Aster argophyllus to Eurybia argophylla in Frédéric Cuvier's Dictionnaire des Sciences Naturelles but this name is considered a synonym. In 1867, George Bentham changed the name to Olearia argophylla in Flora Australiensis. After the genus Olearia was found to be polyphyletic, the genus Shawia was reinstated, and the name Shawia argophylla, first proposed by Henri Baillon in 1882, became the accepted species name.

== Distribution and habitat ==
Shawia argophylla commonly grows on cool moist sheltered slopes and in fern gullies in taller eucalypt forests south from the Whian Whian State Conservation Area in eastern New South Wales, the Australian Capital Territory, through most of eastern Victoria apart from the Grampians to Tasmania where it is common and widespread.

== Use in horticulture ==
Shawia argophylla can be propagated from seed or from cuttings. It prefers partial to full shade in soils that are neutral or slightly acidic, and is frost tolerant.
