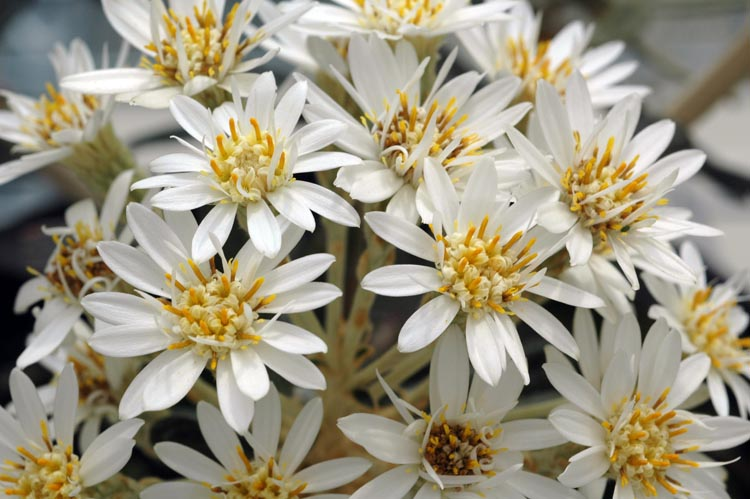
- In the Australian National Botanic Gardens

Scientific classification
- Kingdom: Plantae
- Clade: Tracheophytes
- Clade: Angiosperms
- Clade: Eudicots
- Clade: Asterids
- Order: Asterales
- Family: Asteraceae
- Genus: Olearia
- Species: O. archeri

Binomial name
- Olearia archeri Lander

= Olearia archeri =

Species of shrub

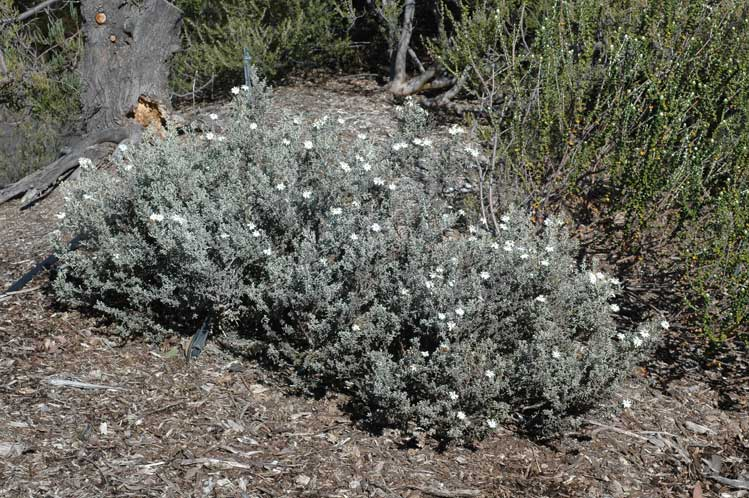
Habit

Olearia archeri is a species of flowering plant in the family Asteraceae and is endemic to Tasmania. It is a shrub with small, crowded, narrowly elliptic leaves and white and yellow, daisy-like inflorescences.

== Description ==
Olearia archeri is a shrub that typically grows to a height of up to 2 m (6.6 ft), its foliage covered with T-shaped hairs. The leaves are narrowly elliptic, 12–99 mm (0.47–3.90 in) long and 3–15 mm (0.12–0.59 in) wide on a petiole 3–7 mm (0.12–0.28 in) long and pale yellowish brown on the lower side. The heads are arranged in many groups of three on the ends of branchlets, each group on a peduncle up to 82 mm (3.2 in) long. Each head or daisy-like "flower" has 7 to 8 white ray florets, the petal-like ligule 8.8–11.2 mm (0.35–0.44 in) long, surrounding 19 to 27 yellow disc florets. Flowering occurs from September to March and the fruit is a brown achene, the pappus with 66–85 bristles.

== Taxonomy and naming ==
Olearia archeri was first formally described in 1989 by Nicholas Sèan Lander in the journal Muelleria from specimens collected by Ann and David Ratkowsky at Cash's lookout on Eaglehawk Neck in 1973. The specific epithet (archeri) honours William Archer.

== Distribution and habitat ==
This daisy-bush grows in shady places in open forest on stony hillsides on the east coast of Tasmania, at altitudes up to 650 m (2,130 ft).
