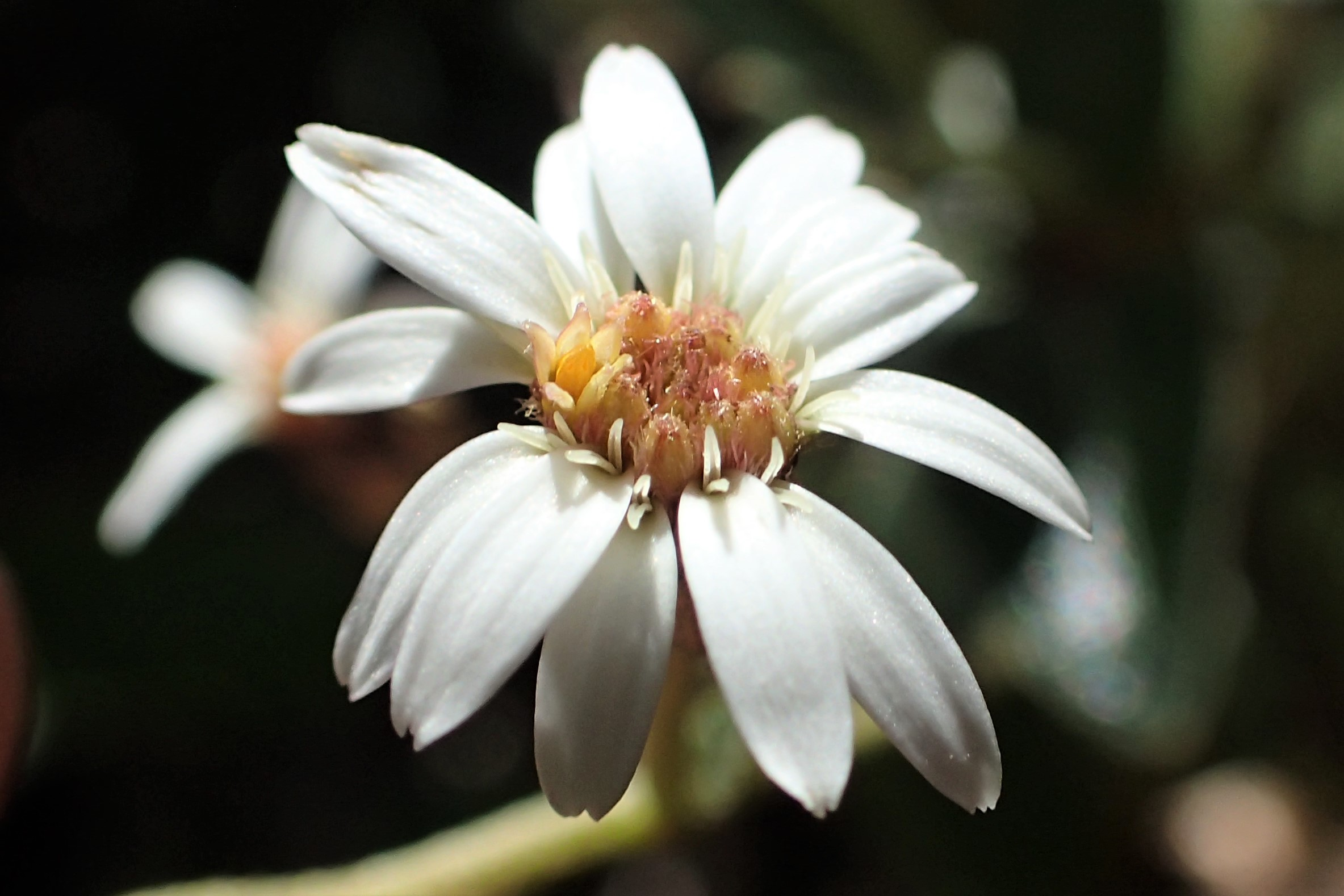
- Shawia avicenniifolia

Scientific classification
- Kingdom: Plantae
- Clade: Tracheophytes
- Clade: Angiosperms
- Clade: Eudicots
- Clade: Asterids
- Order: Asterales
- Family: Asteraceae
- Subfamily: Asteroideae
- Tribe: Astereae
- Subtribe: Celmisiinae
- Genus: Shawia; J.R.Forst. & G.Forst.

= Shawia (plant) =

Genus of flowering plants

Shawia is a genus of flowering plants in the family Asteraceae. It includes 19 species native to Australia and New Zealand.

== Species ==
19 species are accepted.

- Shawia albida (Hook.f.) Sch.Bip.
- Shawia arborescens (G.Forst.) Sch.Bip.
- Shawia argophylla (Labill.) Baill.
- Shawia avicenniifolia Raoul
- Shawia chrysophylla (DC.) Sch.Bip.
- Shawia cydoniifolia (DC.) Sch.Bip.
- Shawia furfuracea (A.Rich.) Raoul ex Sch.Bip.
- Shawia ledifolia (DC.) Sch.Bip.
- Shawia × mollis (Kirk) Saldivia & Nicol
- Shawia lirata (Sims) Sch.Bip.
- Shawia microphylla (Vent.) Sch.Bip.
- Shawia myrsinoides (Labill.) Sch.Bip.
- Shawia nummulariifolia (Hook.f.) Sch.Bip.
- Shawia obcordata (Hook.f.) Sch.Bip.
- Shawia paniculata J.R.Forst. & G.Forst.
- Shawia persoonioides (DC.) Sch.Bip.
- Shawia pinifolia (Hook.f.) Sch.Bip.
- Shawia rosmarinifolia (DC.) Sch.Bip.
- Shawia solandri (Hook.f.) Sch.Bip.
- Shawia virgata (Hook.f.) Sch.Bip.
- Shawia viscosa (Labill.) Sch.Bip.
