= Carl Heinrich "Bipontinus" Schultz =

German physician and botanist (1805–1867)

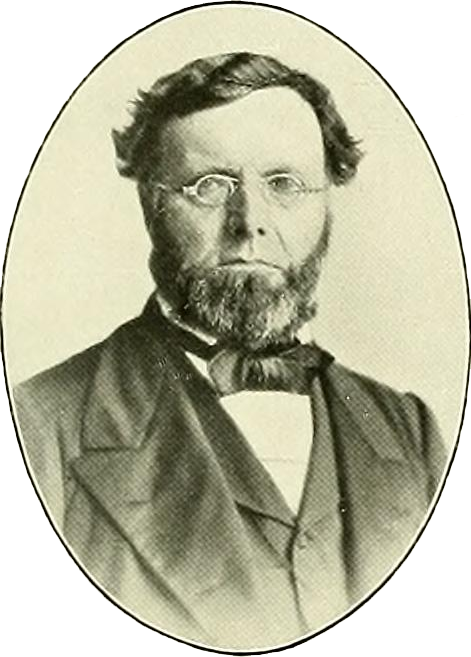
Carl Heinrich 'Bipontinus' Schultz

Carl Heinrich Schultz (30 June 1805, Zweibrücken – 17 December 1867) was a German physician and botanist, and a brother to botanist Friedrich Wilhelm Schultz (1804–1876).

He is referred to as Carl Heinrich "Bipontinus" Schultz, Carl Heinrich Schultz Bipontinus or just Bipontinus, this being a Latinized reference to his birthplace Zweibrücken (Two Bridges). This was necessary because there lived in his lifetime another German botanist of the same name, known as Carl Heinrich "Schultzenstein" Schultz.

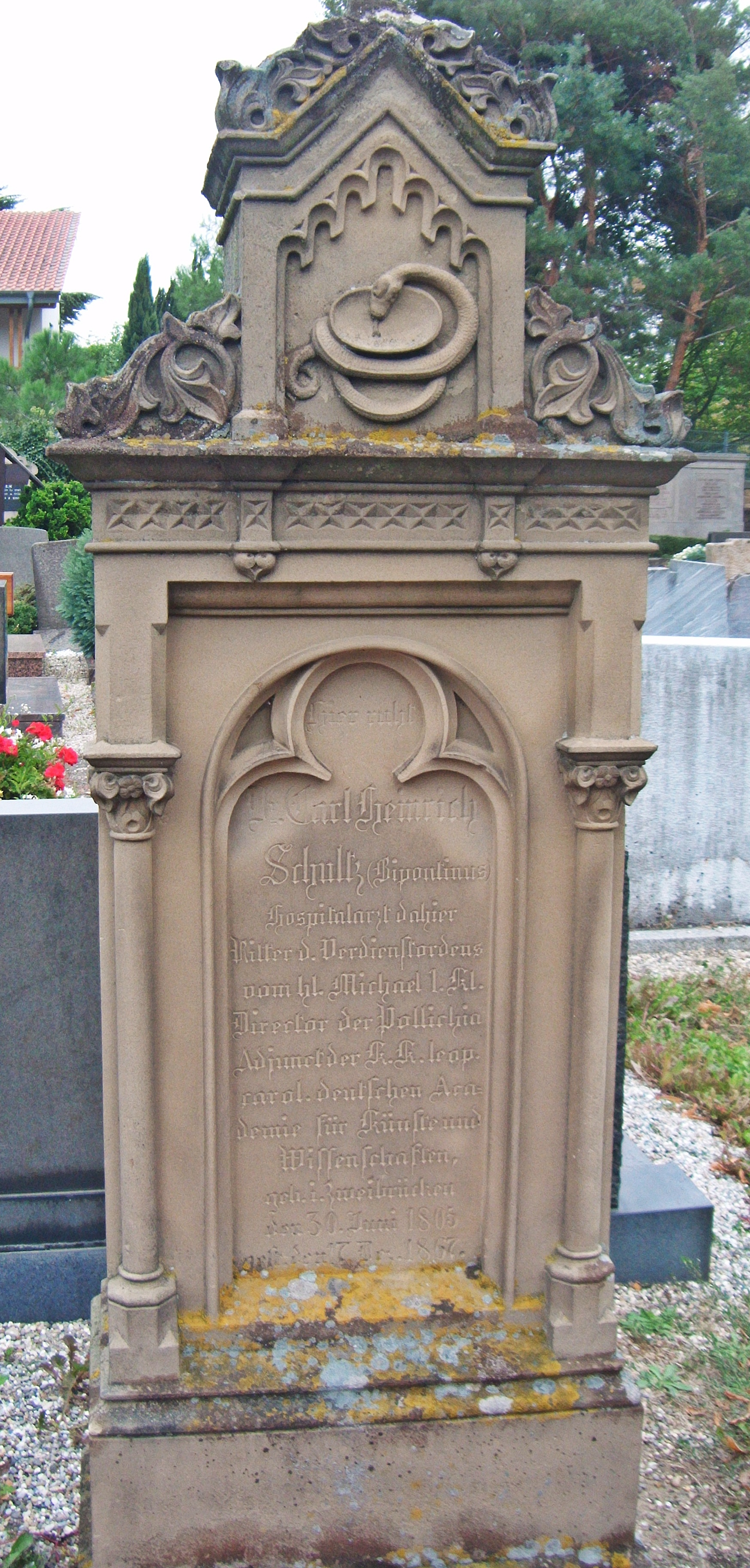
Tombstone in Deidesheim

== Biography ==
From 1825, he studied medicine and sciences at the University of Erlangen, where he was a student of botanist Wilhelm Daniel Joseph Koch. In 1827, he continued his education at the Ludwig-Maximilians-Universität München, where his influences included the naturalist Maximilian Perty. In 1830, he took a study trip to Paris, and after his return, settled into a medical practice in Munich. From 1832 to 1835, he was imprisoned for political reasons, and after his release, spent many years working as a physician at the Deidesheim hospital (1836–67).

He specialized in studies of Compositae and was the taxonomic author of many species within the family. In 1862, he started to edit the exsiccata Cichoriaceotheca s. Cichoriacearum exsiccatorum collectio auctore C. H. Schultz-Bipontino. In 1866 Friedrich Alefeld named the genus Bipontinia (family Fabaceae) in his honor.

In 1840, Schultz along with 25 scholars from the Palatinate and neighboring areas founded POLLICHIA, a scientific society named in honor of botanist Johan Adam Pollich (1740-1780). Schultz died in Deidesheim on 17 December 1867.

== Selected publications ==
- "Analysis Cichoriacearum Palatinatus secundum systema articulatum". Jahrbuch für practische Pharmacie und verwandte Fächer. 4: 202–207. 1841. ISSN 0178-4056.
- Beitrag zur Geschichte und geographischen Verbreitung der Cassiniaceen (Contribution to the History and Geographical Spread of Cassiniaceae), 1866.
